= Cali =

- District and city
- Santiago de Cali
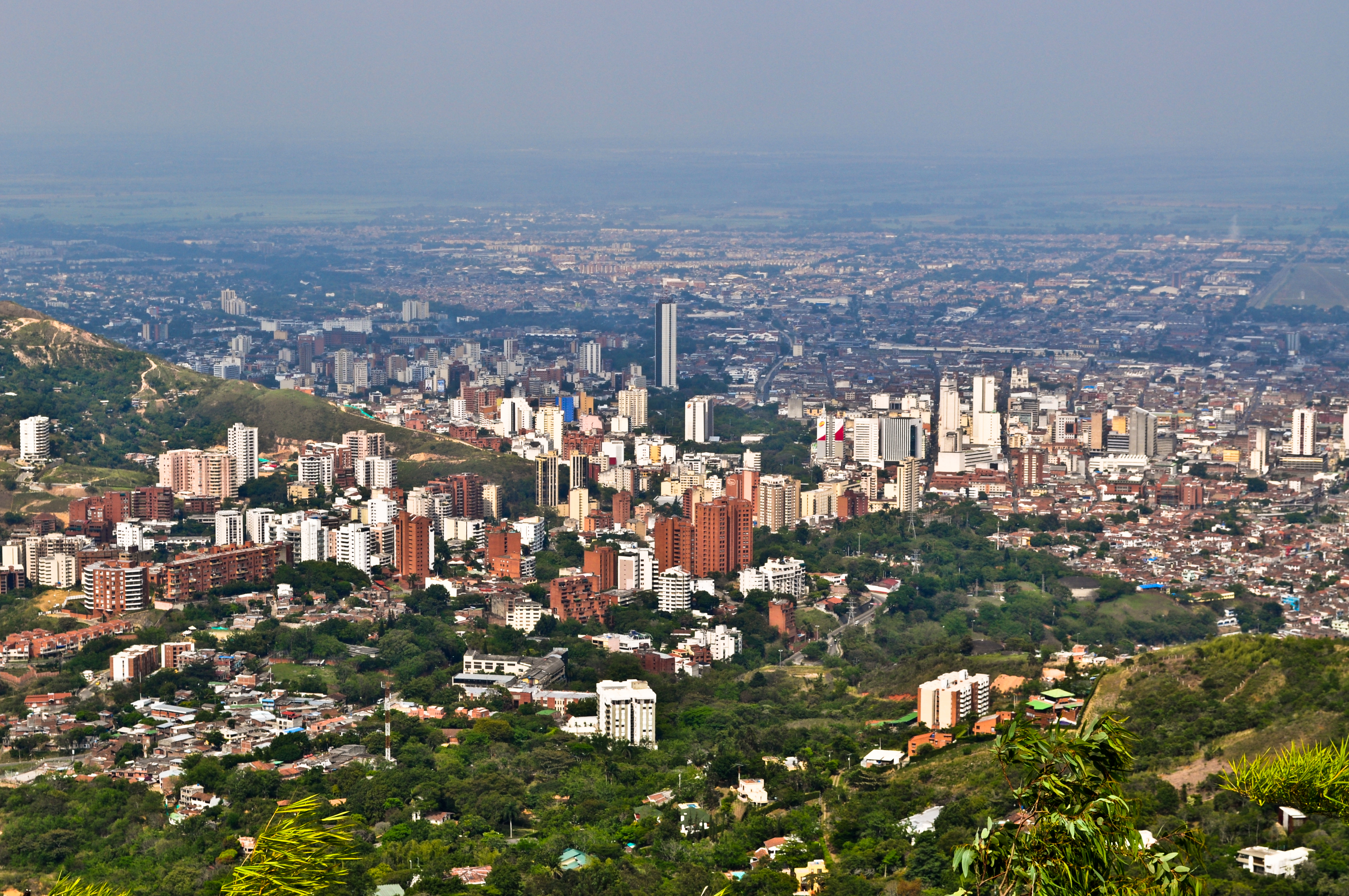
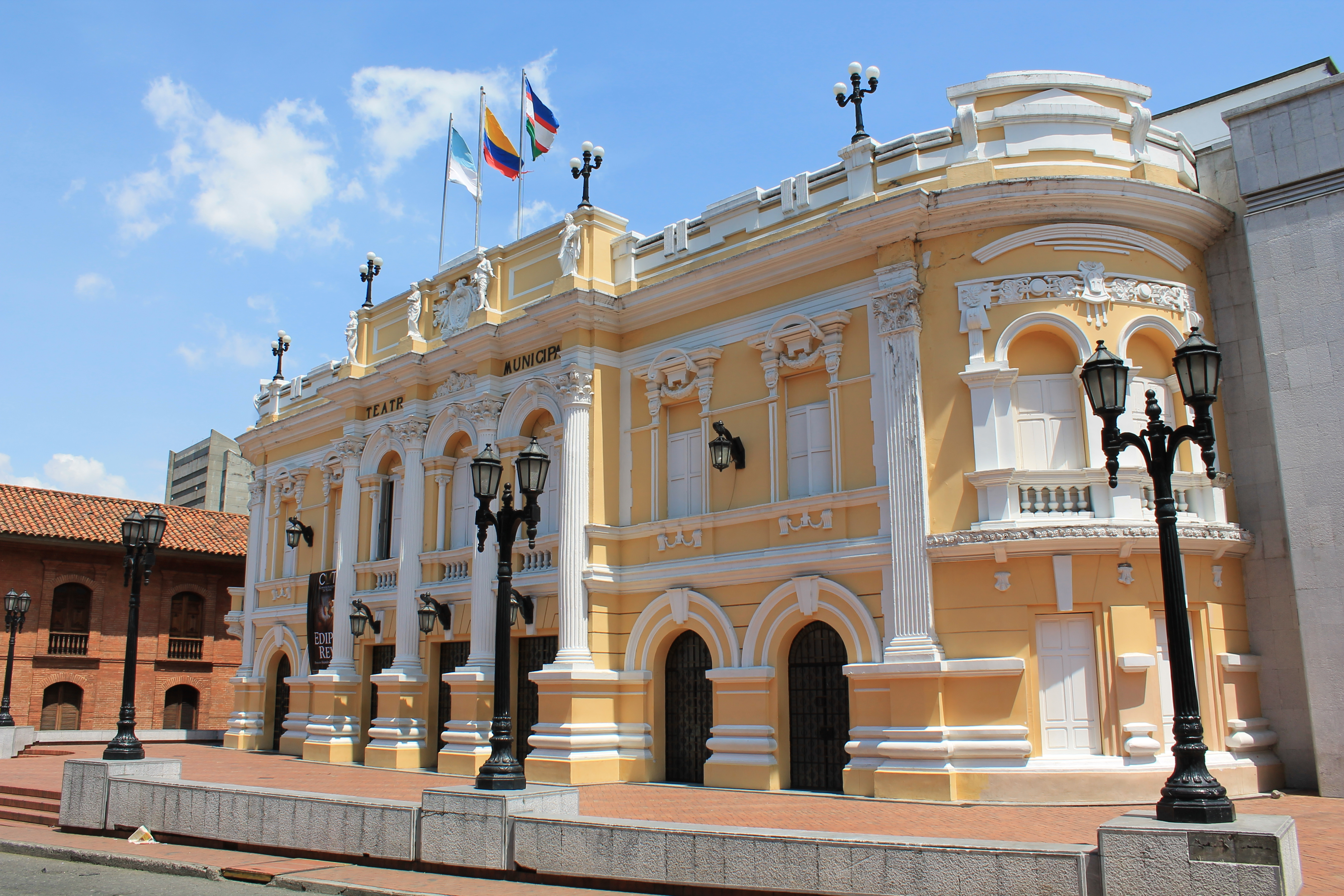
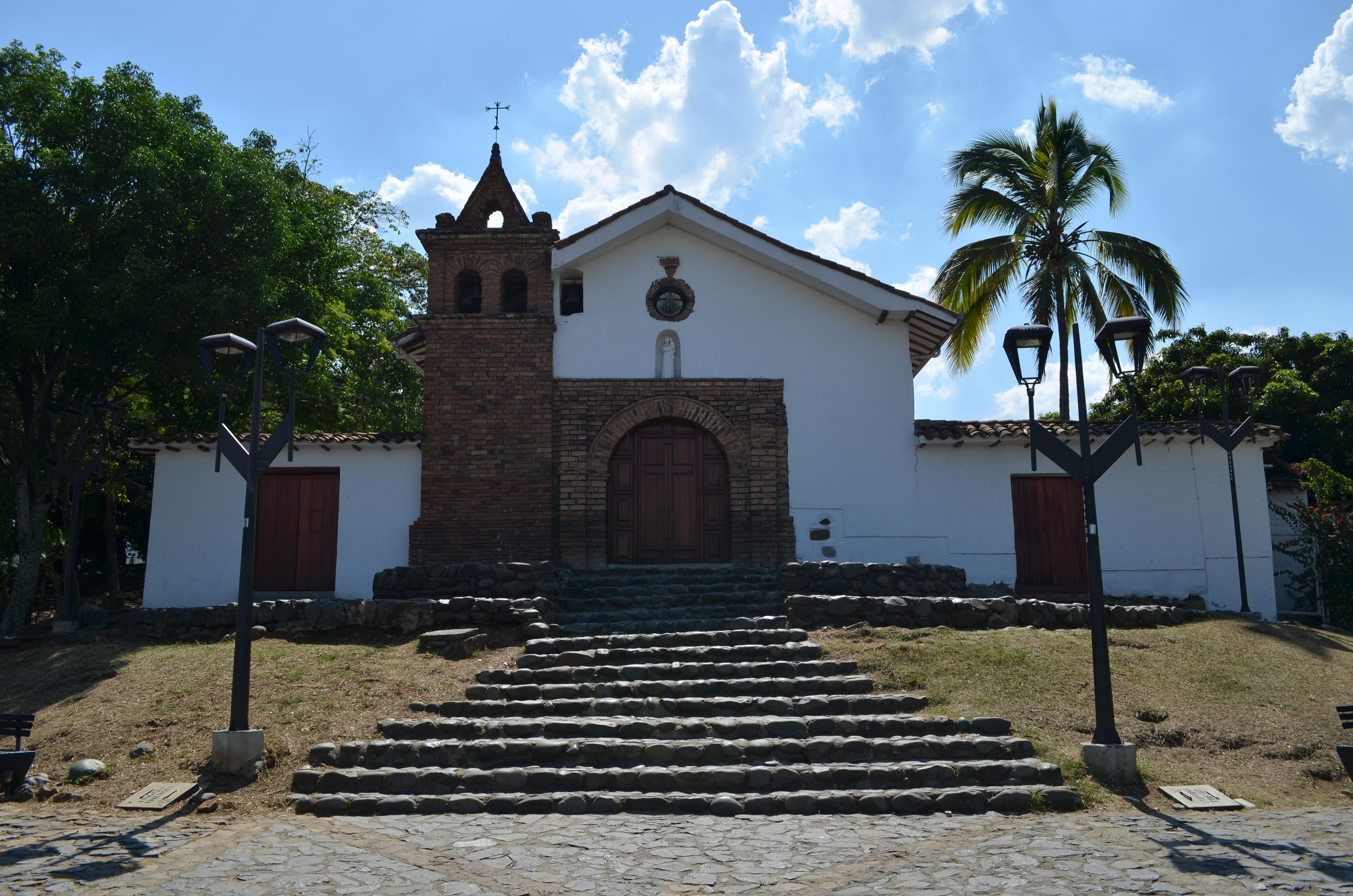
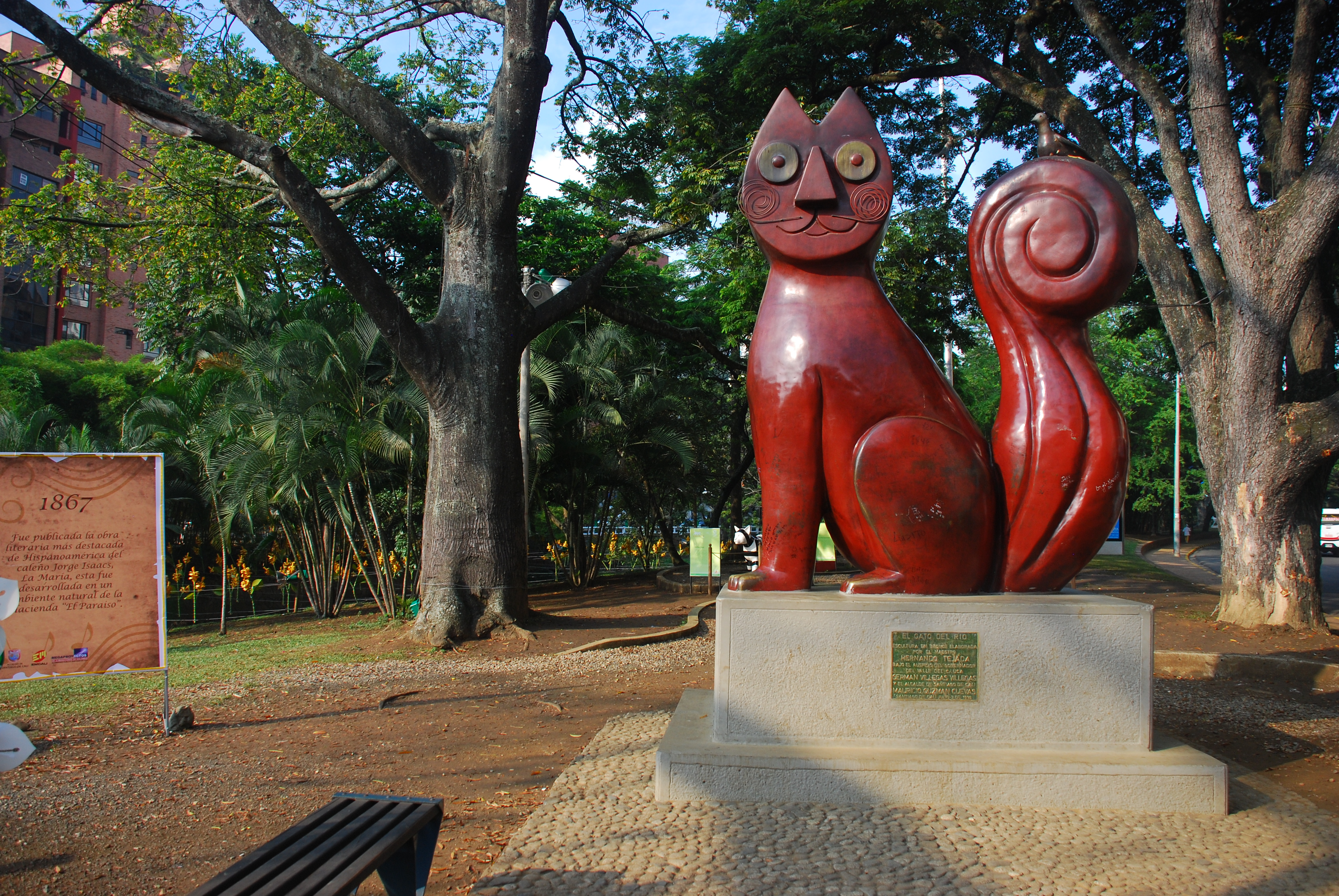
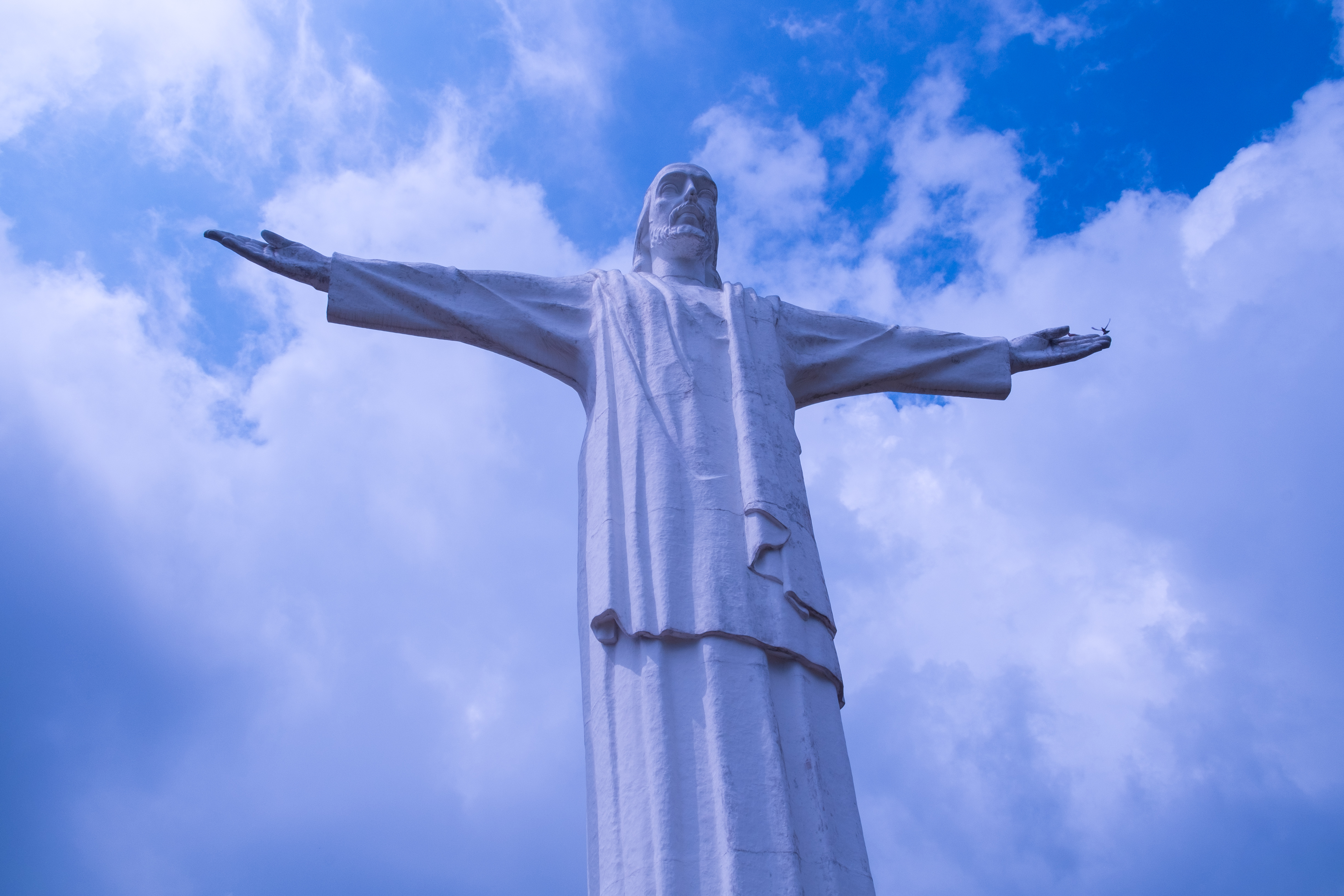
- Cali skyline Enrique Buenaventura Municipal Theater San Antonio Church El Gato del Río Cristo Rey

- Flag Coat of arms
- Nicknames: La capital mundial de la salsa (The Salsa capital of the world); Capital de la felicidad (Capital of Happiness); Capital deportiva de Colombia (Sports Capital of Colombia); Sucursal del cielo (Branch of heaven); La sultana del Valle (The Sultana of the Valley)
- Location of the municipality and city of Cali in the Valle del Cauca Department

- Location in Colombia Cali (South America)
- Coordinates: 3°25′14″N 76°31′20″W
- Country: Colombia
- Department: Valle del Cauca
- Foundation: 25 July 1536
- Founder: Sebastián de Belalcázar

Government
  - Mayor: Alejandro Eder

Area
  - District and city: 619 km^{2} (239 sq mi)
- Elevation: 1,018 m (3,340 ft)

Population (2023)
  - District and city: 2,234,400
  - Rank: Ranked 3rd
  - Density: 3,610/km^{2} (9,350/sq mi)
  - Urban: 2,916,790
  - Metro: 3,400,000
- Demonym: Caleño

GDP (Nominal, 2026)
  - Metro: US$43.2 billion
  - Per capita: US$14,500
- Time zone: UTC-5 (COT)
- Area code: +57 602
- Website: Official website (in Spanish)

Santiago de Cali (Spanish pronunciation: [sanˈtjaɣo ðe ˈkali]), or Cali, is the capital of the Valle del Cauca department, and the most populous city in southwest Colombia, with an estimated 2.3 million residents in 2026. The city spans 560.3 km^{2} (216.3 sq mi) with 120.9 km^{2} (46.7 sq mi) of urban area, making Cali the second-largest city in the country by area and the third most populous. Cali is the main urban and economic center in the south of the country, and has one of Colombia's fastest-growing economies. The city was founded on 25 July 1536 by the Spanish explorer Sebastián de Belalcázar.

As a sporting center for Colombia, it was the host city for the 1971 Pan American Games. Cali also hosted the 1992 World Wrestling Championships, the 2013 edition of the World Games, the UCI Track Cycling World Championships in 2014, the World Youth Championships in Athletics in 2015 as well as the inaugural Junior Pan American Games in 2021 and the 2022 World Athletics U20 Championships.

== Etymology ==
Cali is the shortened form of the official name of the city: Santiago de Cali. "Santiago" honors Saint James whose feast day is celebrated on 25 July. The origin of the word "Cali" comes from the local Amerindians, the "Calima".

== History ==
=== Pre-Columbian era and settlers ===
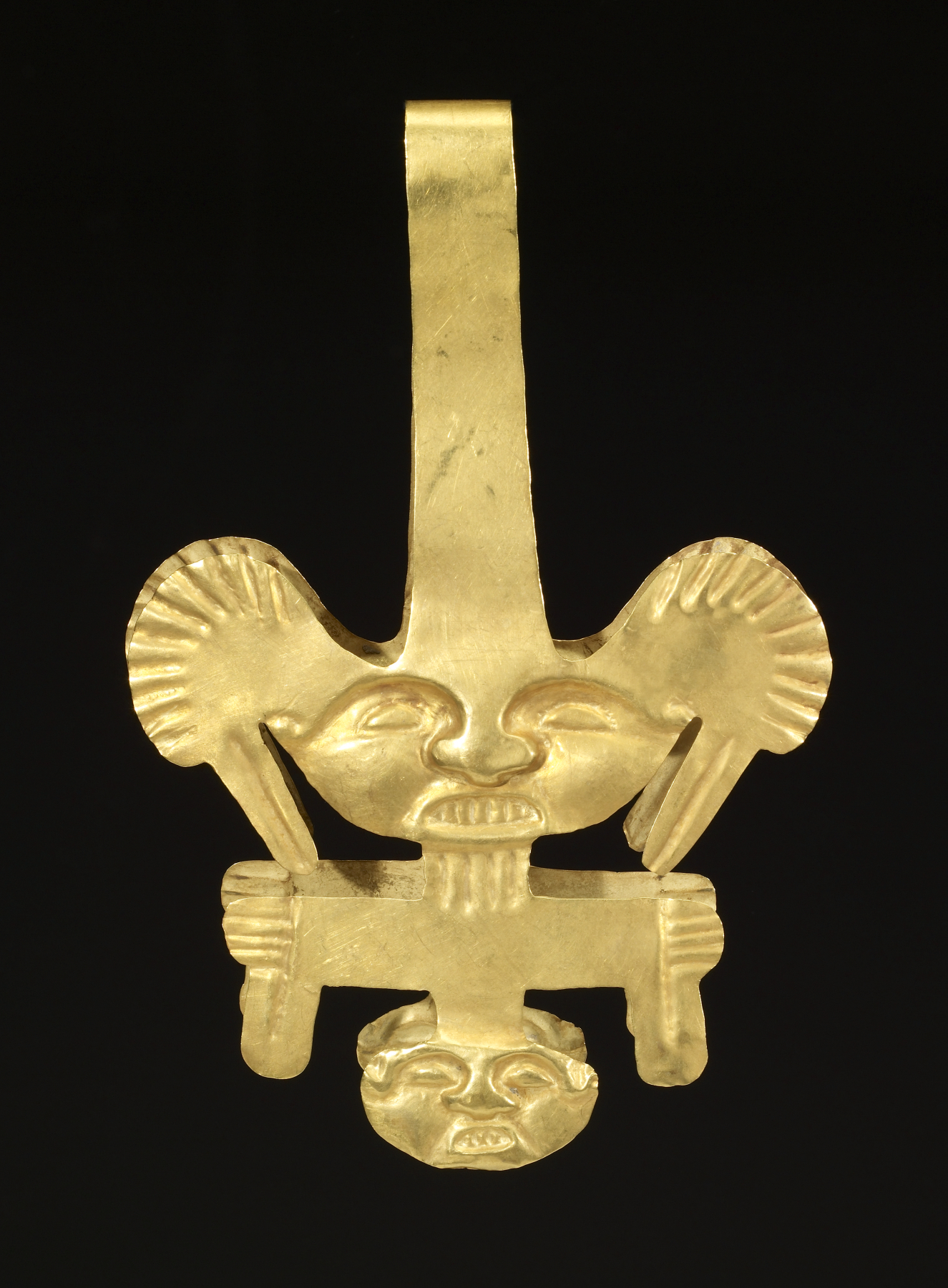
Calima culture gold ceremonial tweezers from Walters Art Museum.

Before the arrival of the Spaniards, the region was inhabited by indigenous tribes, mostly speakers of Cariban languages. In the region between the Cauca River and the Western Cordillera, the Gorrones established themselves between the present day Roldanillo and Santiago de Cali. The biggest town of the Morrones was sited on the River Pescador near the present-day towns of Zarzal and Bugalagrande. The Morrones traded with the Quimbayas who inhabited the north of the Valle del Cauca.

On his way to Cali, Sebastián de Belalcázar first met the Timbas who ran away before the arrival of the men, leaving behind gold. After the Timbas, towards the north, the Spaniards entered the territory of the chief Jamundí and his tribe, the Jamundíes, between the rivers Pance and Jamundí. This tribe offered a strong resistance to the invaders, fighting with poisonous darts and arrows against the arquebuses and swords of the Spaniards. Eventually, the Spanish prevailed in the struggle over the central valley.

Before taking control over the region, the Spaniards had to defeat the chief Petecuy, whose tribe inhabited the area between the river Lilí and the Western Cordillera. Petecuy formed a large army with many tribes and fought the Spaniards on Holy Tuesday of 1536. The natives lost to the Spaniards and the region was divided in encomiendas.

Santiago de Cali was important for Belalcázar because it was outside the Inca Empire. After the capture and execution of the Inca Atahualpa at Cajamarca, Francisco Pizarro had sent Belalcázar to take possession of Guayaquil and Quito on his behalf, but Cali, being outside the Quechua empire, was claimed by Belalcazar as his own territory. After his death, his descendants maintained possession of much of the land until the war of independence against Spain.

=== Founding and colonial period ===
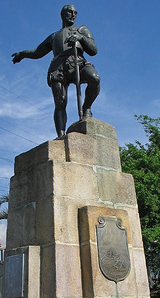
Sebastián de Belalcázar.

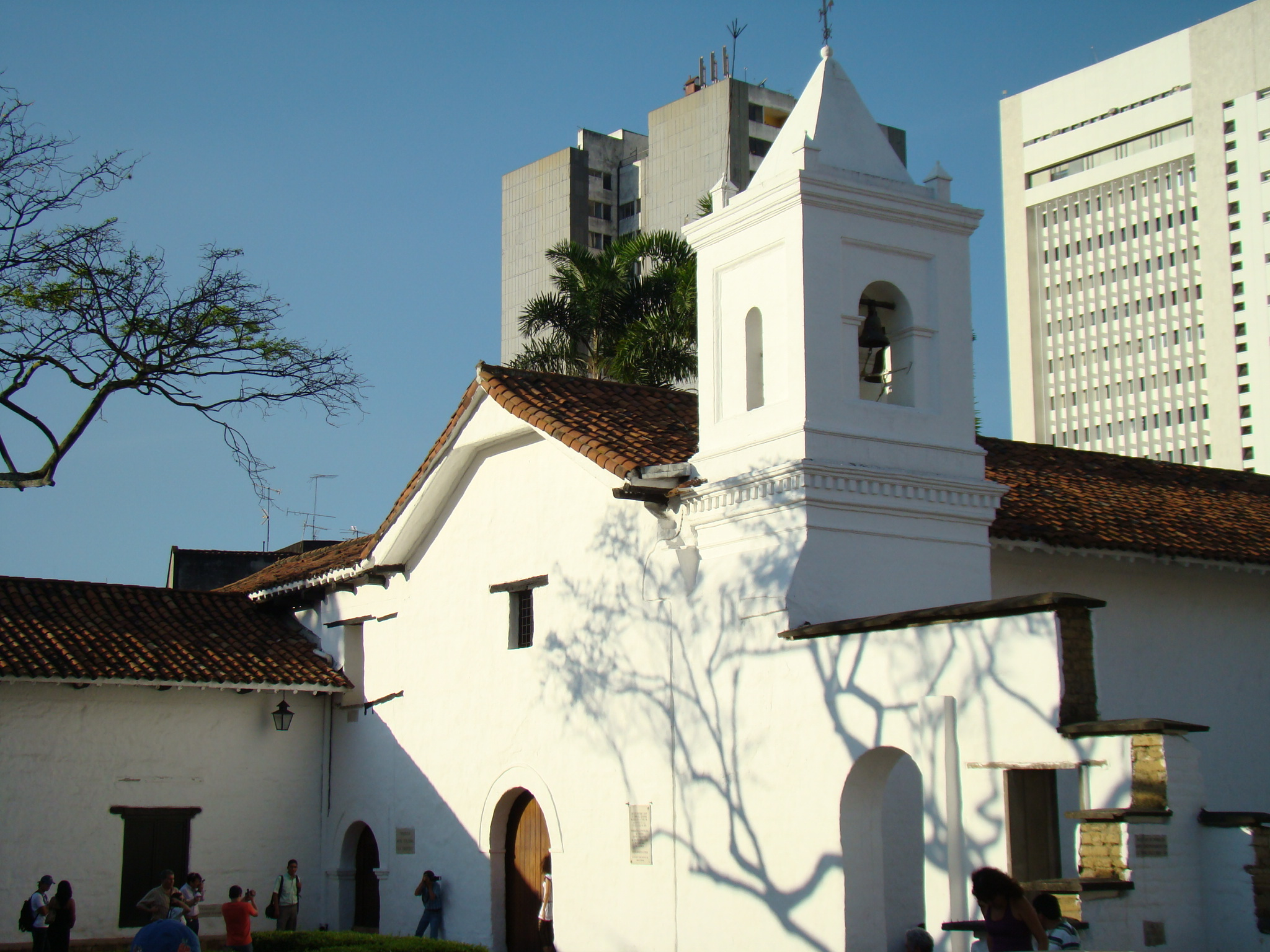
La Merced.

The founder of Cali, Sebastián de Belalcázar, came to the American continent in the third voyage made by Columbus in 1498. In 1532, after serving in Darién and Nicaragua, he joined Francisco Pizarro in the conquest of Peru. In 1534, Belalcázar separated from Pizarro's expedition to find the city of Quito, and later in his search of El Dorado he entered the territory of what is now Colombia, founding the cities of Pasto and Popayán.

Belalcázar founded Santiago de Cali on 25 July 1536, a few kilometres north of its present location, near what are now the towns of Vijes and Riofrío. Under the orders of Belalcázar, captain Miguel Muñoz moved the city to its present location in 1537, where the chaplain Brother Santos de Añasco celebrated a mass in the place occupied by the Church La Merced today, and Belalcázar designated Pedro de Ayala as the first municipal authority.

During the Colonia (colonial period), Santiago de Cali was part of the gobernación of Popayán, which was part of Quito's Audiencia. Although initially Cali was the capital of Popayán's gobernación, Belalcázar moved this function to Popayán in 1540, owing to "better" weather there.

Until the 18th century, most of the territory of what is now Santiago de Cali was occupied by haciendas (cattle farms and plantations of food, with some sugar cane), and the city was only a small town near the Cali River. In 1793, Santiago de Cali had 6,548 inhabitants, 1,106 of whom were (African) slaves. The haciendas were the property of the dominant noble class with many slaves dedicated mostly to stockbreeding and raising sugar cane crops. Many of these haciendas became zones of the present city: Cañaveralejo, Chipichape, Pasoancho, Arroyohondo, Cañasgordas, Limonar and Meléndez. Santiago de Cali was strategically positioned for trade, centrally located in relation to the mining regions of Antioquia, Chocó, and Popayán. The first trail for mules and horses between Santiago de Cali and the port of Buenaventura was completed in the colonial period.

=== Independence ===
On 3 July 1810, Santiago de Cali refused to recognize the Council of Regency of Spain, and established its own junta. This local uprising predates the national one in Bogotá by 17 days. The Governor of Popayán, Miguel Tacón organized an army to control the uprising. The people from Cali called for help to the "Junta Suprema" in Bogotá, which sent a contingent under Colonel Antonio Baraya to support the independence cause. For mutual defense, Cali also formed, with Anserma, Cartago, Toro, Buga and Caloto, the Confederated cities of the Cauca Valley, which declared independence from the Governorate of Popayán on 1 February 1811, although they continued to recognize the absent Ferdinand VII as their head of state. On 28 March 1811 in the battle of Bajo Palacé, the first in Colombia's Independence, the royalist Spanish army was defeated by the revolutionary army commanded by colonel Antonio Baraya with a detachment of 120 soldiers from his native Cundinamarca and a huge garrison of 1,080 men from Valle del Cauca led by brothers Miguel and Francisco Cabal Barona.

In the following years there were many battles between royalists and local militia. After having been released from captivity by Napoleon, Ferdinand VII sent a large army under the command of the "Pacificador" (Pacifier) Pablo Morillo who restored royalist rule in the area by 1816.

In 1819, after Simón Bolívar defeated the bulk of the royalist army in the Battle of Boyacá, there were new uprisings in the Valle del Cauca and the Criollos took control permanently. In 1822, Bolívar arrived in Santiago de Cali. The city was an important military outpost and the region contributed many men to the war of independence that liberated the nations in the south.

=== Modernism ===
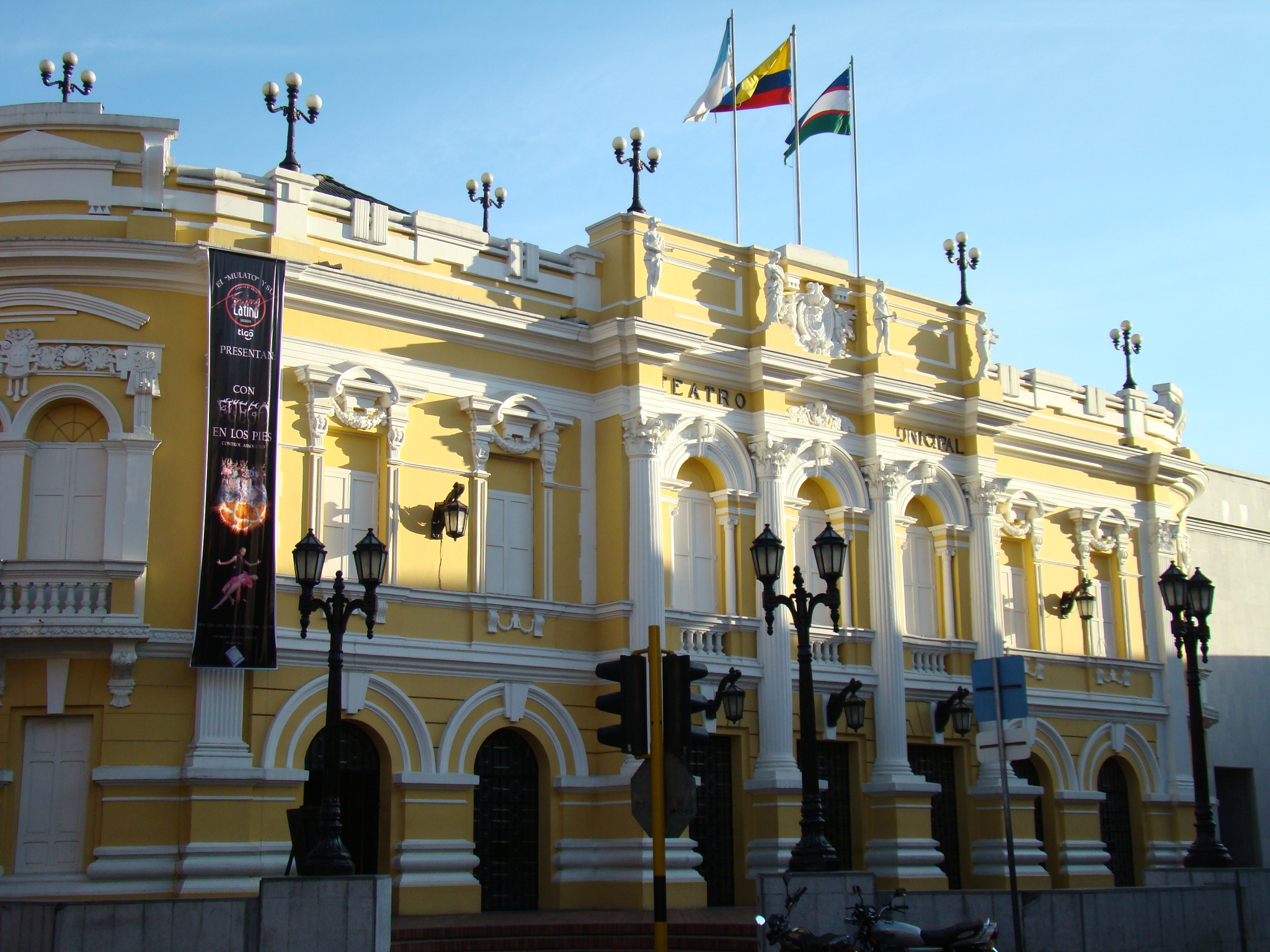
Municipal Theater

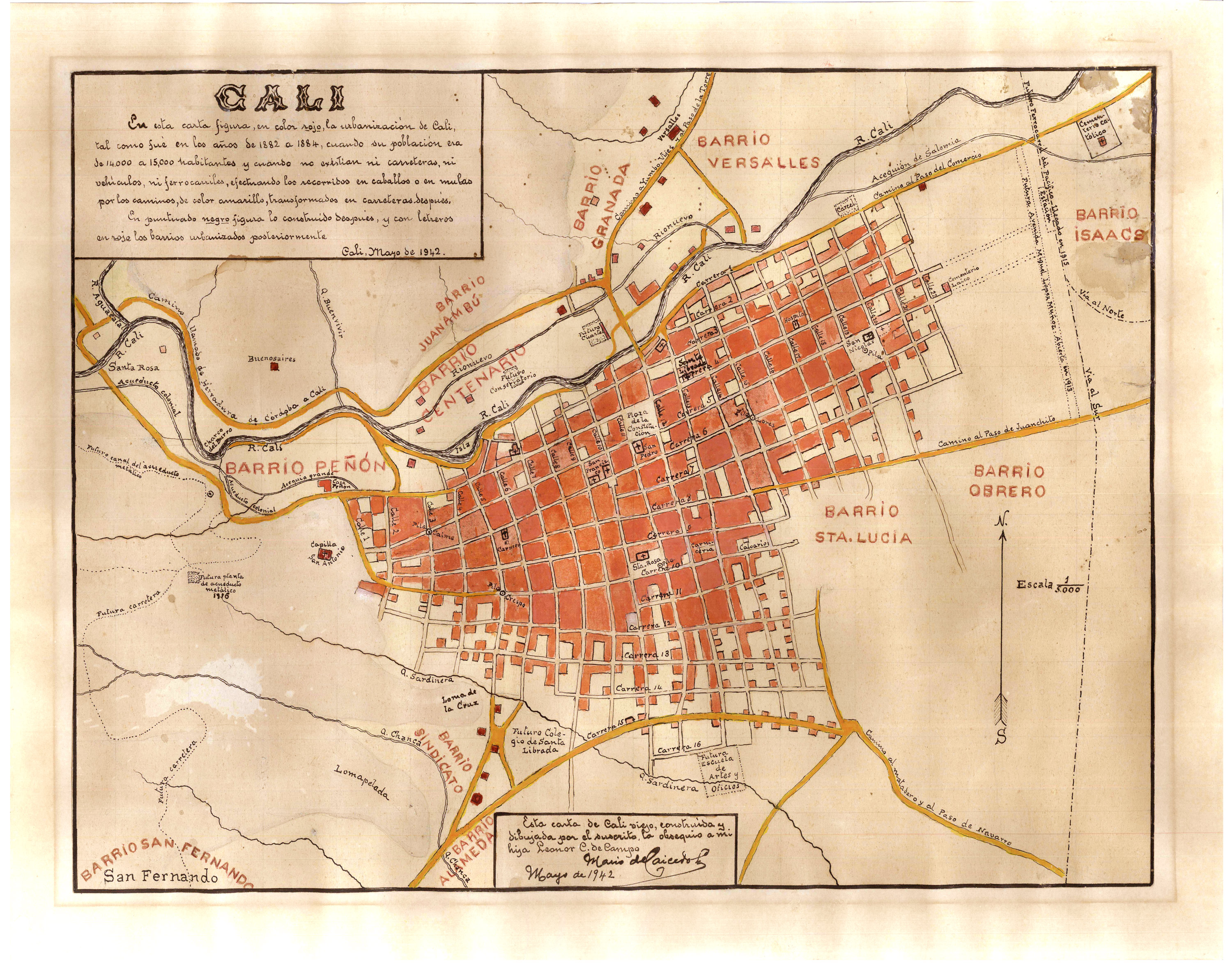
Map of Cali in about 1882–1884, Spanish edition.

In the 19th century Cali, capital of the Valley of the Cauca department, was a quiet community with no more than 20,000 inhabitants. The urban center of the city was around the neighborhoods of Altozano and San Antonio.

Outside the city there were mango plantations, pastures and communal land that were transferred from the Spanish Crown to the working classes. From the market gardens on this land the city was supplied with food. The economy centered around livestock, sugar cane, panela (jaggery; a sugar derivative), cheese and gold mined in the Pacific. There was also a growing industrial and financial sector.

Jewish entrepreneurs came during the 18th and 19th centuries and achieved prominent positions in the city. Some married local women and felt they had to diminish or abandon their identity. These included the De Lima, Salazar, Espinoza, Arias, Ramirez, Perez and Lobo families from the Caribbean, as well as the author Jorge Isaacs of English Jewish ancestry, and the industrialist James Martin Eder (who adopted the more Christian name of Santiago Eder when he translated his name to Spanish) born into the Latvian Jewish community. Over the generations most of their descendants were raised as secular Christians.

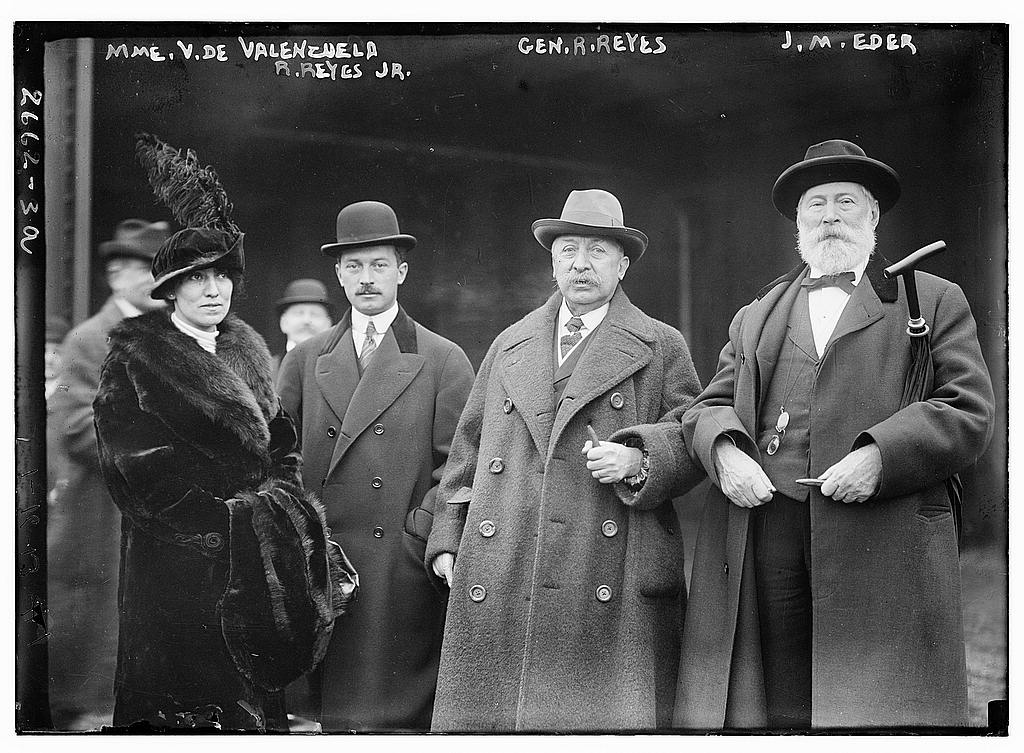
James Martin Eder. Colombian Jewish entrepreneur.

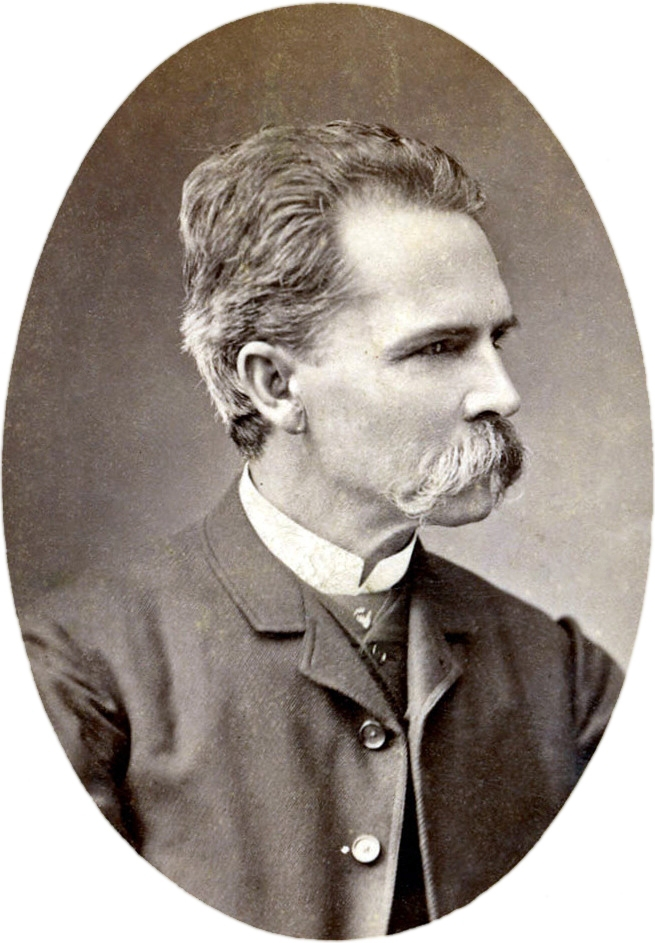
Portrait of Jorge Isaacs. Colombian Jewish writer and intellectual.

Around 1890 the Company of Public Works of Cauca, a private venture, built the market plaza. This spurred commercial development and it transformed into the Plaza Mayor or Plaza de Caycedo. In 1921, the market was sold to the Cali municipality. Very close to the 9th street was the principal station of the tranvia of Cali, a system of public transportation that linked the city with suburban areas.

=== Recent history ===
On 7 August 1956, at around 1 a.m., seven Colombian army trucks filled with 42 tons of dynamite exploded near the train station, destroying eight city blocks. The nearby army barracks was instantly destroyed. Windows were shattered for miles. More than 1,000 people were killed and several thousand injured (see Cali explosion). The following year, the government decided to organize a fair in order to lift up the spirits of citizens as well as generate economic reactivation, which came to be known as the Cali Fair.

In 1971, Santiago de Cali hosted the Pan American Games, an event which is considered by many as the height of the city's golden age as a model of civic orderliness: following it, Cali was named the Sports Capital of Colombia. In 1982, the government of Cali inaugurated what is now the city's largest building and the third-largest in the Republic of Colombia—"La Torre de Cali", or The Cali Tower. It stands 42 stories tall and houses a hotel, offices and apartment complexes.

Cali became a focus center of the 2021 Colombian protests, which started on 28 April 2021. While most demonstrations held in the city were peaceful, there was also strong rioting, looting, and clashes between protesters and police officers. The statue of Spanish conquistador and founder of the city Sebastián de Belalcázar was torn down by Misak protesters, while several buses and stations of the mass transit system MIO were vandalized and burned, causing the MIO network to be destroyed by 60%. Reports of multiple human rights violations and police abuse in the city were received by organizations such as Human Rights Watch. During the night and early morning of 3 May 2021, 5 people died and 33 were injured due to clashes between protesters and the police and ESMAD in the city. In the Siloé neighborhood, a peaceful demonstration was violently broken up by members of the public force, with that sector being also affected by an unexpected internet crash, which occurred twice on 4 and 5 May.

== Geography ==
Cali is located on the Cauca Valley to the west of the Cauca River and to the east of the Western Mountain Range near the hills known as Farallones de Cali. The city rests approximately 1,000 metres (3,281 feet) above sea level. Approximately 100 kilometres (62 miles) west of Cali and over the Western Cordillera, lies the port city of Buenaventura on the Colombian Pacific coast. To the northeast are the manufacturing center of Yumbo and Cali's international airport, the Alfonso Bonilla Aragón (CLO). It is Colombia's third-largest airport in terms of passengers, transporting 2,667,526 in 2009.

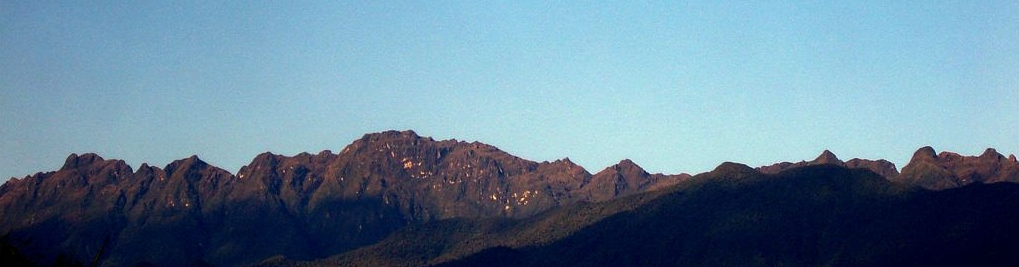
Panoramic Farallones de Cali

Santiago de Cali is located in a valley. The city is completely bordered by mountains to the West; the Farallones de Cali mountains are the closest to the city. The Eastern part of the city is bordered by the Cauca River. To the north and south are extended plains. In the first one you can find the industrial city of Yumbo which is part of Cali's metropolitan area, to the south you can find Jamundí, also part of the metropolitan area. The city is mainly flat, but there are areas mostly to the west that are mountainous, like San Antonio and La loma de la Cruz, which are both tourist sites. There are several rivers that descend from the Western Mountain Range and empty into the Cauca River, passing through the metropolitan area of Cali. In the western part of the city the Aguacatal River flows into the Cali River, which continues on to the Cauca River. In the south the rivers Cañaveralejo, Lilí, and Meléndez flow into the south channel which also empties into the Cauca River. Farther south, the banks of the Pance River are a popular place for recreation and leisure.

=== Climate ===
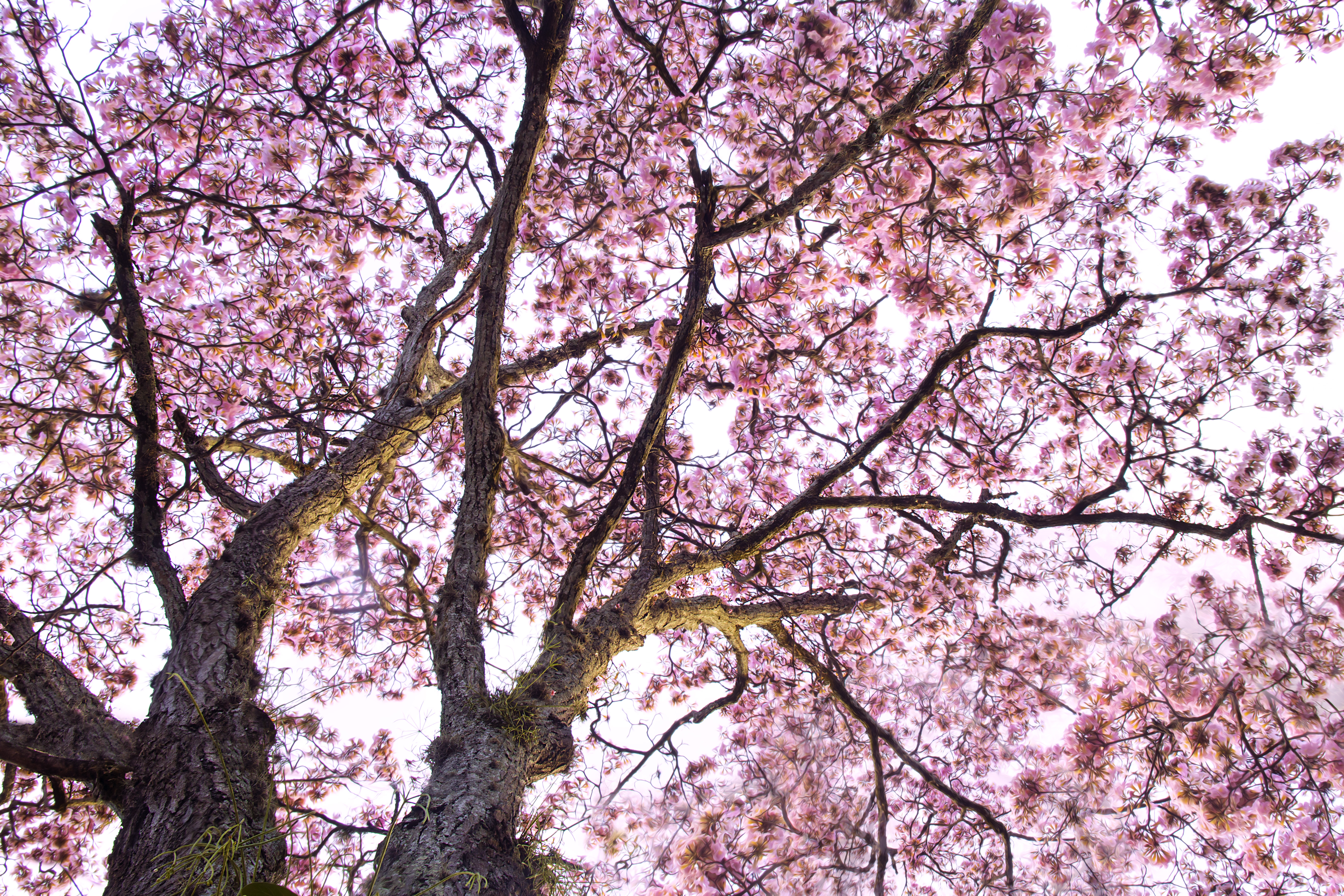
Guaiacum officinale tree flowered in Cali.

Under Köppen's climate classification, Cali features a dry-summer tropical monsoon climate (Köppen climate classification: Am), bordering a tropical savanna climate (Köppen: As). The Western Mountain Range rises from an average of 2,000 m (6,562 ft) above sea level in the northern part of the city to approximately 4,000 m (13,123 ft) to the south. Because of this variation in altitude, the weather in the northwest portion of the city is drier than in the southwest. The average annual precipitation varies between 900 and 1,800 mm (35 and 71 in) depending on the metropolitan zone for a citywide average of approximately 1,483 mm (58 in). Even though there is enough rainfall to make for lush surroundings, Cali is still in a strong rain shadow. Its closest seaport of Buenaventura about 80 kilometres (50 mi) away is among the rainiest locations in the world. This is due to Buenaventura being on the windward side of the coastal mountains that in return shield Cali from the Pacific monsoons. Cali's average temperature is 24 °C (75 °F) with an average low temperature of 17.4 °C (63 °F) and a high of 30.5 °C (87 °F).

Owing to its proximity to the equator, there are no major seasonal variations in Cali like winter, spring, summer and fall. However, locals refer to the dry season as the city's "summer", in which temperatures can rise to 30 to 34 °C (86 to 93 °F) and go down to 15 to 17 °C (59 to 63 °F) at night. During the rainy season (or "winter") temperatures can rise to 28 to 30 °C (82 to 86 °F) and go down to 18 to 20 °C (64 to 68 °F) at night. There are typically two rainy seasons: from March to May and from October to November. However, rain can be expected to fall at any point during the year, nourishing the city's permanent green and lush vegetation. The highest temperature ever recorded was 36.5 °C (98 °F) in July 1997, and the lowest temperature ever recorded was 13.4 °C (56 °F) in August 1979.

Climate data for Cali (Alfonso Bonilla Aragón International Airport), elevation 964 m (3,163 ft), (1991–2020)
| Month | Jan | Feb | Mar | Apr | May | Jun | Jul | Aug | Sep | Oct | Nov | Dec | Year |
|---|---|---|---|---|---|---|---|---|---|---|---|---|---|
| Record high °C (°F) | 36.3 (97.3) | 36.5 (97.7) | 36.4 (97.5) | 33.2 (91.8) | 32.8 (91.0) | 33.2 (91.8) | 34.4 (93.9) | 35.0 (95.0) | 34.5 (94.1) | 33.7 (92.7) | 32.0 (89.6) | 32.8 (91.0) | 36.5 (97.7) |
| Mean daily maximum °C (°F) | 30.3 (86.5) | 30.6 (87.1) | 30.2 (86.4) | 29.8 (85.6) | 29.6 (85.3) | 29.8 (85.6) | 30.5 (86.9) | 31.1 (88.0) | 30.6 (87.1) | 29.6 (85.3) | 29.2 (84.6) | 29.5 (85.1) | 30.1 (86.2) |
| Daily mean °C (°F) | 24.0 (75.2) | 24.2 (75.6) | 24.2 (75.6) | 23.9 (75.0) | 23.9 (75.0) | 23.9 (75.0) | 24.1 (75.4) | 24.3 (75.7) | 24.1 (75.4) | 23.5 (74.3) | 23.4 (74.1) | 23.6 (74.5) | 23.9 (75.0) |
| Mean daily minimum °C (°F) | 18.9 (66.0) | 19.1 (66.4) | 19.2 (66.6) | 19.3 (66.7) | 19.3 (66.7) | 18.9 (66.0) | 18.6 (65.5) | 18.5 (65.3) | 18.6 (65.5) | 18.7 (65.7) | 18.9 (66.0) | 18.9 (66.0) | 18.9 (66.0) |
| Record low °C (°F) | 14.4 (57.9) | 15.4 (59.7) | 14.6 (58.3) | 14.6 (58.3) | 16.2 (61.2) | 15.1 (59.2) | 13.6 (56.5) | 13.4 (56.1) | 14.2 (57.6) | 15.0 (59.0) | 15.1 (59.2) | 15.0 (59.0) | 13.4 (56.1) |
| Average precipitation mm (inches) | 47.6 (1.87) | 54.0 (2.13) | 89.2 (3.51) | 134.2 (5.28) | 103.1 (4.06) | 49.7 (1.96) | 32.1 (1.26) | 28.7 (1.13) | 64.6 (2.54) | 99.2 (3.91) | 105.0 (4.13) | 68.5 (2.70) | 875.9 (34.48) |
| Average precipitation days (≥ 1 mm) | 5.7 | 6.4 | 10.0 | 12.1 | 11.0 | 6.3 | 5.0 | 4.5 | 6.8 | 11.0 | 10.8 | 7.9 | 97.5 |
| Average relative humidity (%) | 73 | 72 | 73 | 76 | 76 | 75 | 73 | 71 | 72 | 75 | 76 | 75 | 74 |
| Mean monthly sunshine hours | 179.8 | 158.1 | 161.2 | 141.0 | 142.6 | 150.0 | 182.9 | 189.1 | 159.0 | 155.0 | 153.0 | 164.3 | 1,936 |
| Mean daily sunshine hours | 5.8 | 5.6 | 5.2 | 4.7 | 4.6 | 5.0 | 5.9 | 6.1 | 5.3 | 5.0 | 5.1 | 5.3 | 5.3 |
Source: Instituto de Hidrologia Meteorologia y Estudios Ambientales (mean temperature, humidity, sun 1971-2010)

Climate data for Cali (Marco Fidel Suárez Air Base), elevation 954 m (3,130 ft), (1981–2010)
| Month | Jan | Feb | Mar | Apr | May | Jun | Jul | Aug | Sep | Oct | Nov | Dec | Year |
|---|---|---|---|---|---|---|---|---|---|---|---|---|---|
| Mean daily maximum °C (°F) | 30.2 (86.4) | 30.4 (86.7) | 30.3 (86.5) | 29.8 (85.6) | 29.5 (85.1) | 29.4 (84.9) | 30.2 (86.4) | 31.0 (87.8) | 30.4 (86.7) | 29.8 (85.6) | 29.0 (84.2) | 29.1 (84.4) | 30.0 (86.0) |
| Daily mean °C (°F) | 25.3 (77.5) | 25.4 (77.7) | 25.4 (77.7) | 25.0 (77.0) | 25.2 (77.4) | 25.1 (77.2) | 25.4 (77.7) | 25.8 (78.4) | 25.5 (77.9) | 24.8 (76.6) | 24.6 (76.3) | 24.6 (76.3) | 25.2 (77.4) |
| Mean daily minimum °C (°F) | 19.7 (67.5) | 19.7 (67.5) | 19.8 (67.6) | 19.9 (67.8) | 19.9 (67.8) | 19.6 (67.3) | 19.4 (66.9) | 19.5 (67.1) | 19.5 (67.1) | 19.5 (67.1) | 19.6 (67.3) | 19.7 (67.5) | 19.7 (67.5) |
| Average precipitation mm (inches) | 74.8 (2.94) | 61.2 (2.41) | 94.2 (3.71) | 139.8 (5.50) | 132.9 (5.23) | 66.7 (2.63) | 47.7 (1.88) | 40.3 (1.59) | 69.9 (2.75) | 119.9 (4.72) | 117.9 (4.64) | 83.6 (3.29) | 1,048.8 (41.29) |
| Average precipitation days | 9 | 9 | 13 | 15 | 14 | 10 | 8 | 7 | 11 | 16 | 13 | 12 | 130 |
| Average relative humidity (%) | 71 | 71 | 72 | 75 | 75 | 73 | 70 | 67 | 69 | 73 | 74 | 75 | 72 |
Source: Instituto de Hidrologia Meteorologia y Estudios Ambientales

Climate data for Cali (University of Valle), elevation 985 m (3,232 ft), (1981–2010)
| Month | Jan | Feb | Mar | Apr | May | Jun | Jul | Aug | Sep | Oct | Nov | Dec | Year |
|---|---|---|---|---|---|---|---|---|---|---|---|---|---|
| Mean daily maximum °C (°F) | 30.0 (86.0) | 30.3 (86.5) | 30.2 (86.4) | 29.6 (85.3) | 29.4 (84.9) | 29.6 (85.3) | 30.3 (86.5) | 31.1 (88.0) | 30.7 (87.3) | 29.5 (85.1) | 29.0 (84.2) | 29.2 (84.6) | 29.9 (85.8) |
| Daily mean °C (°F) | 24.5 (76.1) | 24.7 (76.5) | 24.7 (76.5) | 24.4 (75.9) | 24.4 (75.9) | 24.4 (75.9) | 24.7 (76.5) | 25.1 (77.2) | 24.8 (76.6) | 24.1 (75.4) | 23.8 (74.8) | 24.1 (75.4) | 24.5 (76.1) |
| Mean daily minimum °C (°F) | 19.4 (66.9) | 19.5 (67.1) | 19.6 (67.3) | 19.6 (67.3) | 19.6 (67.3) | 19.2 (66.6) | 18.7 (65.7) | 18.7 (65.7) | 19.0 (66.2) | 19.1 (66.4) | 19.2 (66.6) | 19.4 (66.9) | 19.2 (66.6) |
| Average precipitation mm (inches) | 102.7 (4.04) | 109.5 (4.31) | 149.6 (5.89) | 191.3 (7.53) | 162.7 (6.41) | 89.4 (3.52) | 63.0 (2.48) | 51.0 (2.01) | 103.0 (4.06) | 160.7 (6.33) | 170.2 (6.70) | 130.3 (5.13) | 1,483.4 (58.40) |
| Average precipitation days | 12 | 12 | 15 | 18 | 16 | 12 | 10 | 9 | 13 | 18 | 18 | 14 | 164 |
| Average relative humidity (%) | 72 | 71 | 72 | 76 | 76 | 74 | 70 | 67 | 69 | 74 | 75 | 74 | 72 |
| Mean monthly sunshine hours | 167.4 | 146.8 | 155.0 | 138.0 | 142.6 | 156.0 | 186.0 | 186.0 | 153.0 | 139.5 | 135.0 | 148.8 | 1,854.1 |
| Mean daily sunshine hours | 5.4 | 5.2 | 5.0 | 4.6 | 4.6 | 5.2 | 6.0 | 6.0 | 5.1 | 4.5 | 4.5 | 4.8 | 5.1 |
Source: Instituto de Hidrologia Meteorologia y Estudios Ambientales

== Tourism ==
Cali Tower
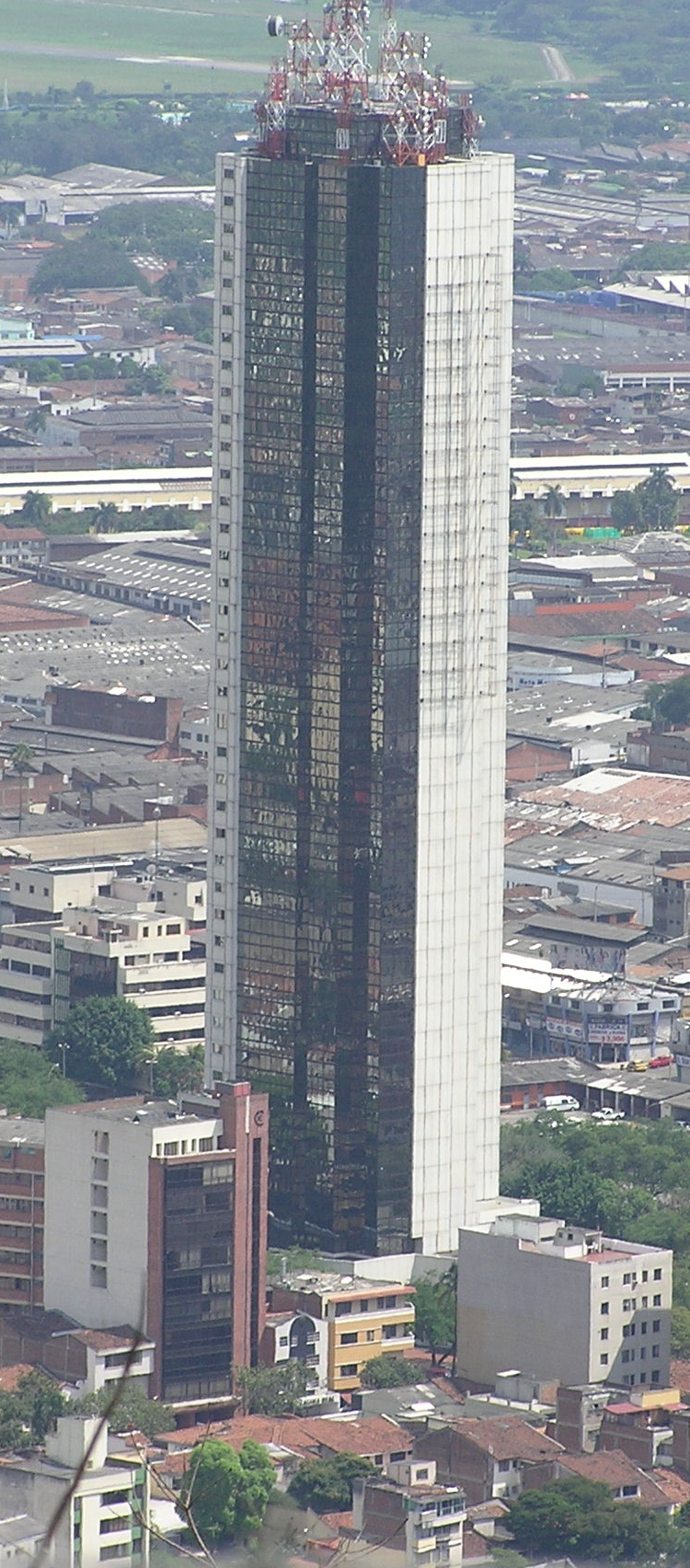

General information
- Coordinates: 3°27′32.40″N 76°31′44.4″W
- Completed: 1984

Design and construction
- Architect: Jaime Vélez
- Developer: Julián Echeverri cía.
- Structural engineer: Enrique Martínez Romero

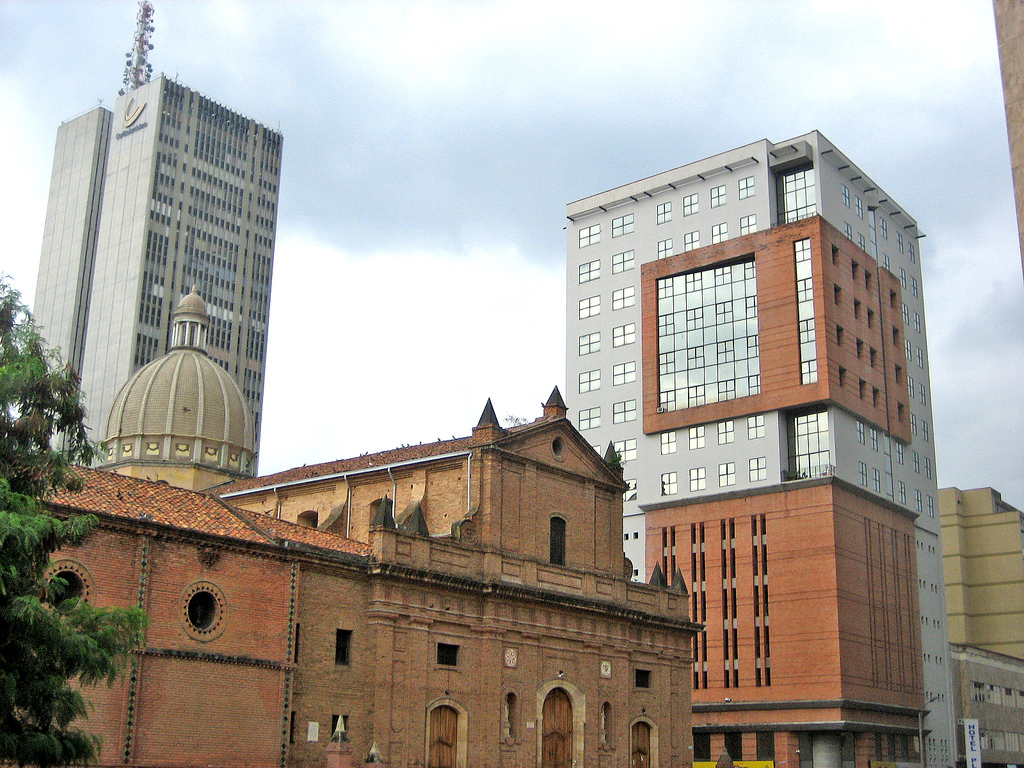
Saint Francis' square.

=== Historic district ===
Santiago de Cali offers historical areas with cultural variety and other attractions. In downtown Cali there are many historic churches such as La Merced and La Ermita. Cali contains a well-preserved historical center. The most important zone is La plaza de Cayzedo, considered the center of the city, which is a square surrounded by many historical and modern buildings like El edificio Otero, La Catedral and El Palacio de Justicia. This plaza is close to other tourist places, like The Saint Francis church (in Spanish, Iglesia de San Francisco), the municipal theater and La Merced church. The city is also rich in monuments, parks, squares and museums. The most emblematic sculptures are Cristo Rey, located upon a mountain range; Sebastian de Belalcazar, founder of the city; and Las tres Cruces, a place of pilgrimage during the days of the Holy Week.

=== Other tourist attractions ===
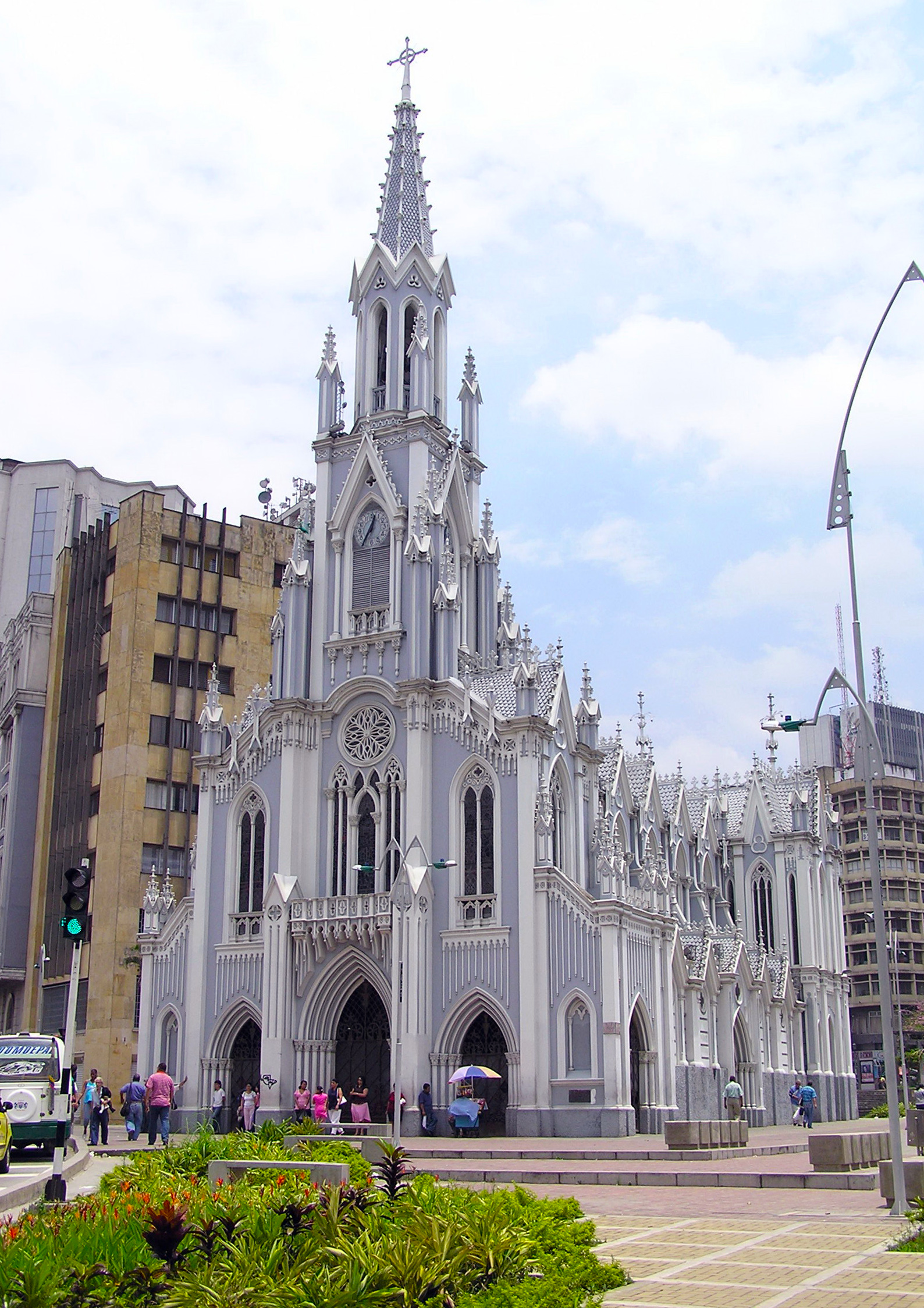
Ermita Church.

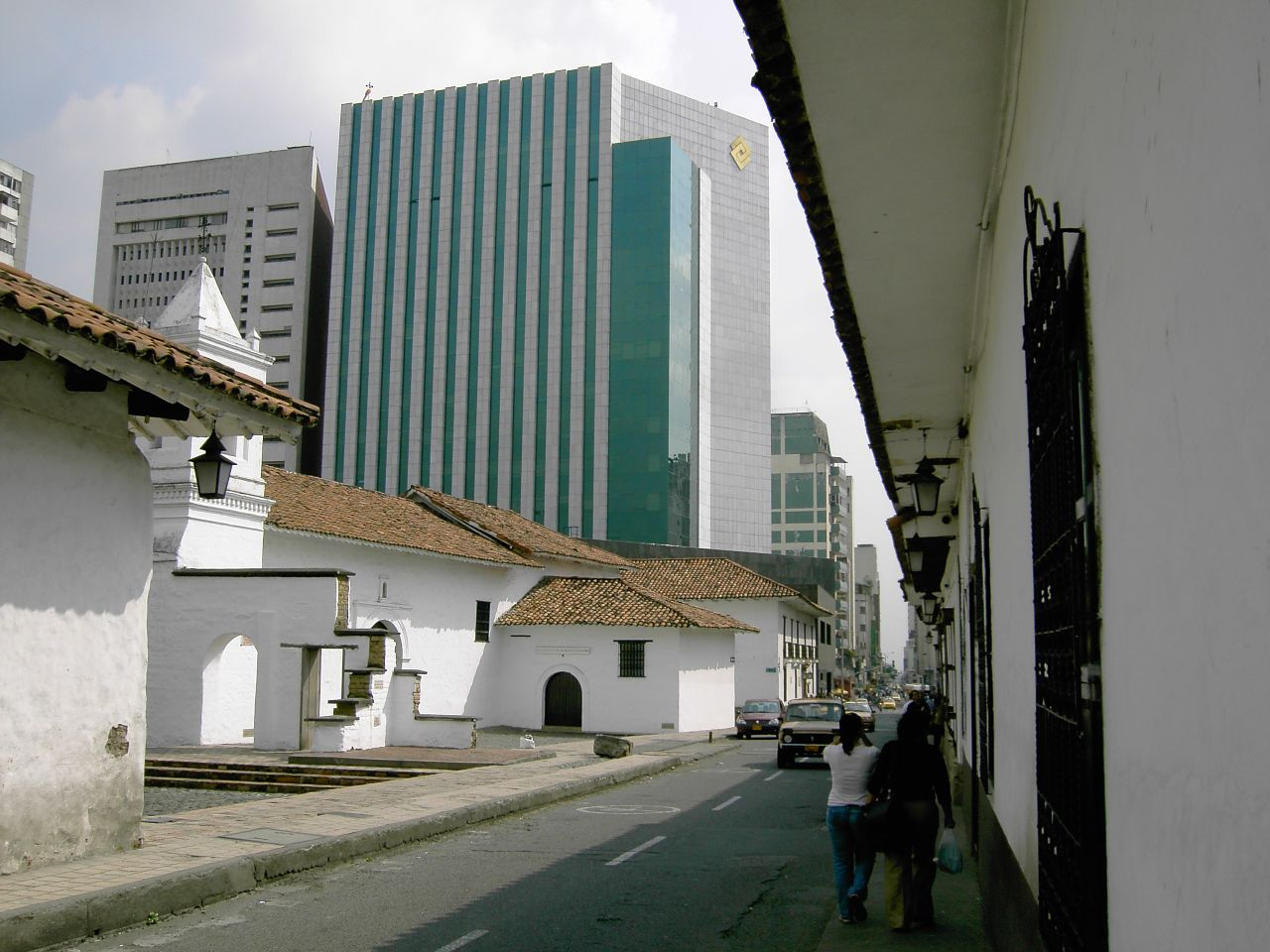
Church La Merced, Sede Banco de Occidente al fondo.

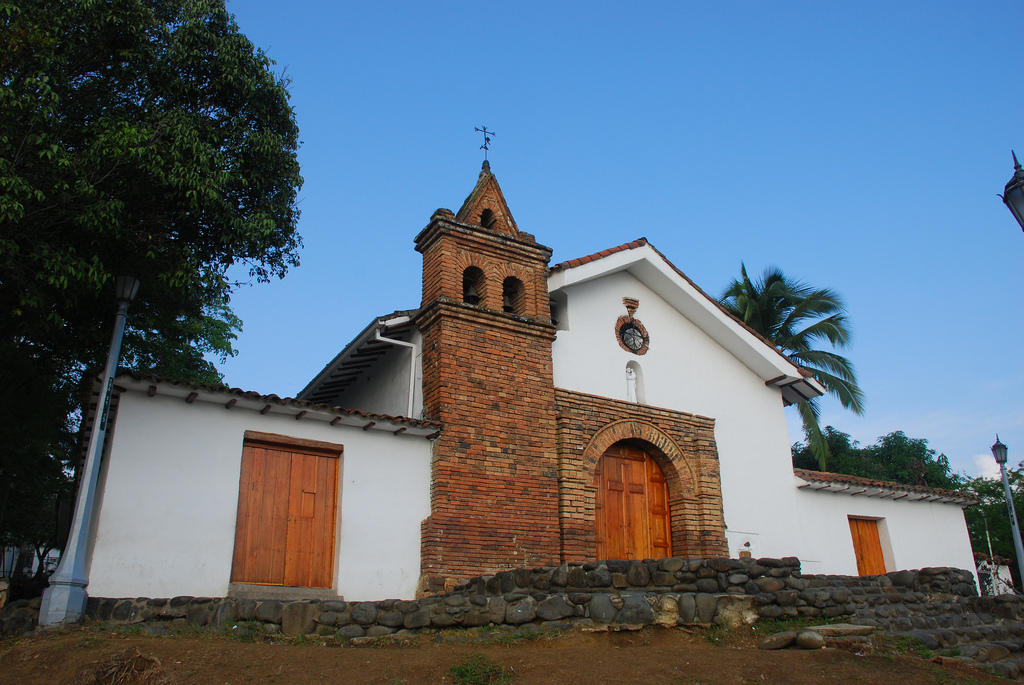
San Antonio church.

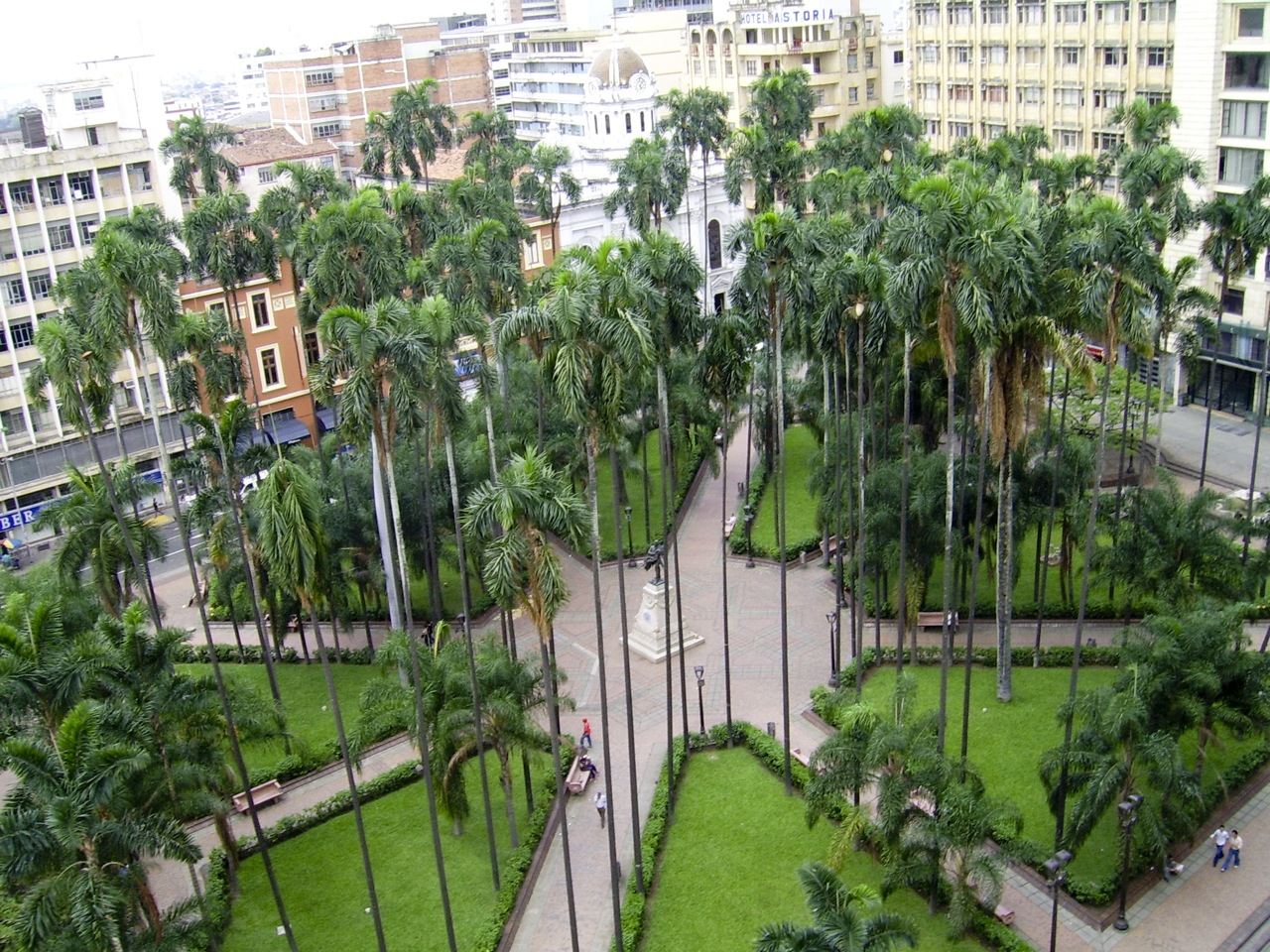
Plaza de Cayzedo (Cayzedo Square).

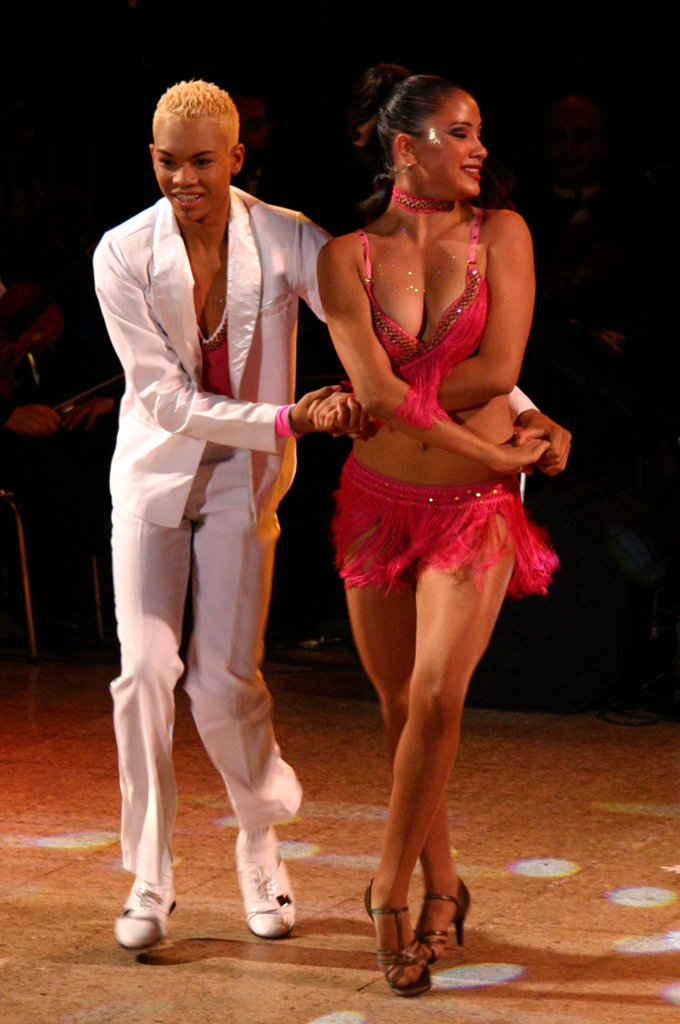
Salsa show at the XIII International Art Festival Cali.

Some of Cali's main tourist centers include:

- Plaza de Caicedo: The main square of the city, located in downtown Cali. The plaza is named after Cali's hero, Joaquín de Caicedo y Cuero.
- Parque del perro: Located in the San Fernando neighborhood, this is one of the most popular areas in the city. It is full of restaurants and bars. The park gets its name because it has a dog monument in the middle of it.
- Avenida San Joaquín: Located in the Ciudad Jardín, it is a popular place in the city.
- Sebastian de Belalcázar's monument: It is the most visited and popular monument in the city located in the hills overlooking the city. The monument is famous due to its pointing finger which is pointing to the opposite direction of the valley, while its face is looking down at the city.
- Cali River: The river is located in the west and is surrounded by restaurants, hotels and museums like La Tertulia, an art museum.
- El Gato del Río: Located next to the river, a sculpture of a cat by Hernando Tejada
- Cristo Rey: A religious monument located on a hill that offers the best view of the city. It is 31 m high, of which 5 m belong to the base.
- Boulevard del río Cali: (Colombia Avenue Boulevard) is located by the Cali river side in the historic center of the city of Santiago de Cali, Colombia. It carries the name of the avenue where vehicles used to transit but today is the boulevard where there is a tunnel located directly below it. This boulevard is about 980 meters long.
- San Antonio: This is the most traditional neighborhood of Cali. In the colonial age, it was the extension of the downtown. Although it was split off by 'La calle Quinta' (Fifth street). The entire neighborhood is on a hill, and at the top you will find the San Antonio Park.
- Juanchito: Host to a large number of night clubs dedicated to salsa music, motels offering hourly rates, and adjacent to some of the poorest areas of the city. Technically, it belongs to another municipality, but is often visited by and associated with citizens of Cali.
- Farallones de Cali: A part of the city sits on hills belonging to the Colombian western mountain chain. Beyond these hills is Farallones de Cali national park.
- La Ceiba: A large and old Ceiba tree on a street corner at the west of the city.
- Orquideorama Enrique Perez Arbeláez: This wooded park, at AV 2 N #48-10, is the site of the large orchid show hosted each fall by Asociacion Vallecaucana de Orquideologia. In 2011, the show was to be held from 21 to 25 September and was to include international judging by the American Orchid Society. It is also a good place for birdwatching.
- Cerro de las Tres Cruces: The Three Crosses monument sits at 1,480 m above sea level and is located in the NW part of the city. The central cross is the largest sitting at 26 m tall and 11 m wide. The two crosses besides the main cross have a height of 22 m and a width of 8 m. Visitors are known to hike the mountain and can enjoy the view of the city, a freshly squeezed orange/carrot juice, and an outdoor gym before hiking back down.

=== Medical tourism ===
According to recent Lonely Planet guides of Colombia, Cali has recently become famous for being a prime destination for people seeking cheap cosmetic surgery and aesthetician centers. The city is very well known as The Capital of the Plastic Surgeries. There have been no significant reports of problems in this area, but Lonely Planet advises proper research before pursuing such an idea. About 50,000 cosmetic surgery procedures occurred in Cali in 2010, of which around 14,000 involved patients from abroad.

== Transport ==
=== Airports ===
Santiago de Cali is served by Alfonso Bonilla Aragón International Airport (IATA: CLO, ICAO: SKCL), located in the City of Palmira. It is Colombia's third largest airport in terms of passengers (transporting 3,422,919 in 2010) and fourth in cargo. Alfonso Bonilla Aragón is located in a long, narrow valley that runs from north to south, and is surrounded by mountains up to 14,000 feet (4,300 m) high. The airport is connected to the city by a highway known as the "recta a Palmira", that in the last few years has been upgraded to make the airport more accessible to Cali and the surrounding city centers in the region. The airport has also been remodeled recently; some of the last significant events in those terms were the inauguration of the VIP room in the National terminal and the installation of a main electronic screen in the center of the check-in area.

The Marco Fidel Suárez Air Base is a military airport close to the city's downtown. It is located in the east side of the city and belongs to the Colombian Air Force. It is used as one of the main training centers for the country's fighter pilots.

=== Public transport ===
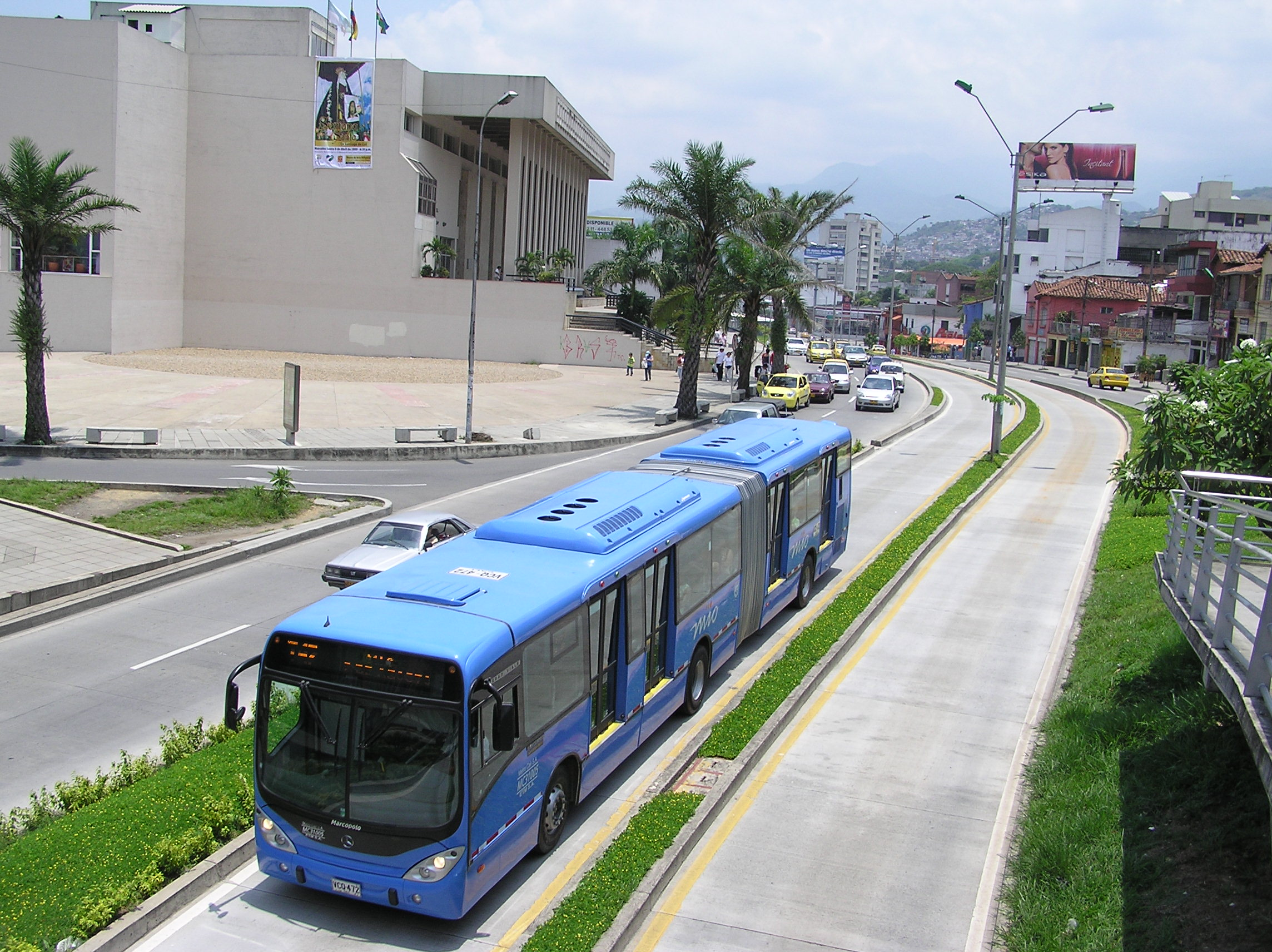
Masivo Integrado de Occidente (MIO)

The city of Cali offers a variety of ways to move through the city. In March 2009, The Masivo Integrado de Occidente (MIO) began operations. It is planned to be the primary system that connects the city. Non-MIO buses in various neighborhoods round out the system. Taxis are available.

Masivo Integrado de Occidente (MIO): It is a bus rapid transit system of articulated buses that run on dedicated bus lanes in the middle of major thoroughfares, with stations connected to sidewalks by dedicated pedestrian crossings or bridges. The system layout is 243 kilometres (151 miles) distributed in trunk, pre-trunk and complementary corridors. The system also integrated the renovation and recuperation of the public space. The MIO system was not only designed for the public transport, but built for public use with extensive new sidewalks, parks, gardens and public squares for the public to enjoy.

The system also includes a cable car line named MIO Cable, which is fully integrated with the MIO network and directly serves the residents of the Siloé district.

List of the Trunk or principal corridors:

- Calle 5
- Carrera 15
- Calles 13 y 15
- Avenida de las Américas
- Avenida 3N
- Carrera 1
- Transversal 25
- Carrera 29 y Autopista Oriental
- Autopista Simón Bolívar
- Avenida Ciudad de Cali
- Carrera 100
- Avenida Cañasgordas
- Avenida Colombia
- Autopista Sur

More information about El MIO is in the official web site of Metrocali.

=== Bus Central Station ===
Cali is served by over 20 coach companies which gather in the Central Bus Station. The Station is centrally located near the old (now redundant) railway station, which serves now as Metrocali's headquarters. Depending on the company and the destination, the vehicles range from minibuses to large coaches. Recently, in their last float renovation wave, Colombian coaches operators have opted for Brazil's Marcopolo buses. Informal stops exist for the short destination rides all along the way from Central Station to the town of destination. In some cases, it is enough for a passenger to ask to get off the bus for the bus to stop.

=== Public transportation statistics ===
The average amount of time people spend commuting with public transit in Cali, for example to and from work, on a weekday is 88 min. 23% of public transit riders, ride for more than 2 hours every day. The average amount of time people wait at a stop or station for public transit is 21 min, while 43% of riders wait for over 20 minutes on average every day. The average distance people usually ride in a single trip with public transit is 5.6 km, while 3% travel for over 12 km in a single direction.

== Economy ==
Cali and Valle del Cauca constitute the third largest center national and international economic exchange in Colombia. The city is an important stop on way to Ecuador, and is connected with the world through the seaport of Buenaventura.

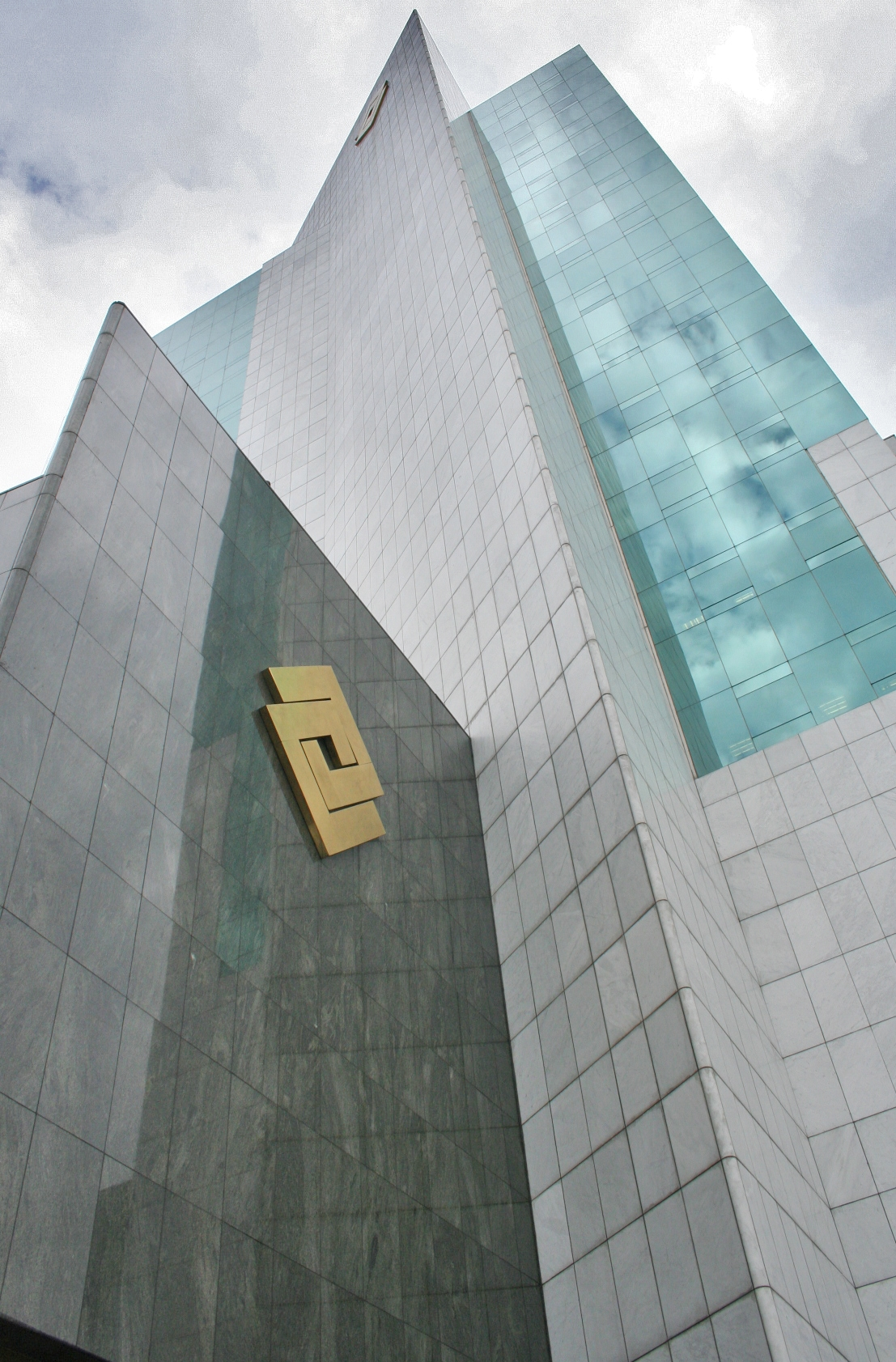
Building of Banco de Occidente.

=== Economic history ===
The economic transformation of Cali and the Valle del Cauca during the twentieth century and its crisis of the century, and the outlook to the new century have been the subject of deep analysis of financial and academic institutions. This section is based on the analysis and recommendations of the report Cali Colombia – Toward a City Development and Strategy published by the World Bank in 2002, and the Regional Economic Situation Reports (ICER) published quarterly by the DANE.

In the early twentieth century the city's economy was concentrated in the production of sugar, based on an agricultural model in which large tracts of land were cultivated with minimum use of labor. As a result, a few families owned vast areas of land in one of the most fertile regions of the country. This was an important factor in determining the power relations and the organization of the city through the twentieth century.

In the period 1910–1930, the city's economy shifted its focus from an agricultural model to become a commercial node at the national level through the development of basic infrastructure such as construction of the railway to Buenaventura and the creation of the department of Valle del Cauca with Cali designated as its capital.

Although the industrial vallecaucana revolution of Cali did not begin until the third decade of the twentieth century, some companies had already begun to build the industrial development of the region, as the printing company Carvajal y Cia (which began operations in 1904). In 1929 there is the creation of Soap Varela Hermanos, in the 1930s other industries begin to grow as large scale factories of gas and beer, printing and cigarettes. Smaller companies also appeared focusing on textile clothing, chemicals, chocolates, building materials, leather articles and furniture.

In 1940, Cali had already ceased to be a single point of trade and its economy was focused on industry. A few years before the decade began a major investment of foreign capital led to the establishment of many factories and local business grew to multinational corporations; as Croydon in 1937, Cementos del Valle in 1939, and Carton Colombia in 1941; Goodyear and Colgate-Palmolive came from the US in 1941. Later came other corporations like General CEAT (Centelsa) in 1955, and pharmaceutical laboratories were based in the Cauca Valley between 1940 and 1960, as Tecnoquímicas and Baxter.

The flourishing industrial city attracted waves of immigration in the 1950s and 1960s. In these decades there were important partnerships between the public and private sectors, as productive sector support to programs of business administration at the University of Valle. The growth of the university training professionals and technologists, as well as infrastructure development, were crucial for the further development of industry and trade in the Valle del Cauca. This trend continued in the 1970s and early years of the next decade. Public investment in infrastructure reached significant levels benefiting not only the production sector but also the growing population, this made Cali and Valle del Cauca models further development across the country.

In 1998, when the economic crisis became apparent, the national government could not respond to the call of the local politicians and mayors had to introduce austerity measures under pressure from creditors, which caused the vallecaucano development model to collapse. Additionally, the tightening of the country's internal conflict required a tax increase aimed at national war spending, leaving less room for local governments to collect, through taxes, the money required for their development plans.

=== Current statistics ===
According to statistics by DANE, in 1995 the annual growth of GDP of the Valle del Cauca region was almost twice the national rate. For 1997, GDP increased marginally, with the region itself going up 1%. In 1999 the country's economic recession was felt through a depression that made the economy contract, showing GDP growth of 4%. Since then GDP has grown in the valley with ups and downs, but its percentage share nationwide has been falling since 1995 as shown in the graph.

The department contributes significantly to the national economy. According to statistics for the year 2005, for agriculture the valley contributes 5.37% of the national production, which is relatively low compared with Antioquia (15.48%) or Cundinamarca (12.81%). In fisheries products, the region ranks first, with the region contributing 36% of the country's total production. As for mining, the valley is not a metal-producing region; however, in terms of non-metallic minerals, the department contributes 8.15% of the total value added across Colombia.

The regional industries contribute 13.81% of the national value-added tax, second only to Bogotá with 25.39% and 18.20% in Antioquia. Particularly, the industries of food, beverages and ethanol from sugarcane are important products in the valley's economy, contributing 16% of the national value added, equaled or surpassed only by Antioquia and Bogotá. On trade, nationally Bogotá has 32.22%, Antioquia 13.25%, and Valle 11.34%. In the valley transportation services provide 12.52% of value added.

The Consumer Price Index (IPC) of Cali has been since the last decade one of the lowest among Colombian cities. About 78% of Cali's people are of working age (over 18 years). In 2005, for the first time in six years, the city had an occupancy rate above 60%, which confirms the good state of the economy, led primarily by growth in manufacturing, agriculture, and trade, among others.

Drogas La Rebaja, one of Colombia's largest pharmacy store chains, is based in Cali.So is candy company Colombina. A bank, Banco de Occidente, a Grupo Aval company, has its head office in Cali.

== Public order ==
Cali had a murder rate of 26.8 per 100,000 inhabitants in 2021; this fell to 25.8 per 100,000 inhabitants in 2025. In 2006 the budget for security in Medellín was more than four times higher than in Cali, and in Bogota (which is 3.5 times more populous) the budget was more than seven times higher.

Between 1 January and 1 December 2011 there were 1870 intentional homicides in the municipality of Cali, which is considered a 5% increase compared to 2010. The surge in violence in Cali in 2011 has partly been attributed to what has been described as an ongoing 'mafia war' between the 'neo-paramilitary' groups Los Rastrojos and Los Urabeños, both involved in drug trafficking. Los Rastrojos are considered the 'heirs' of the Cali Cartel and Los Urabeños have their roots in Colombia's coast. Los Rastrojos are accused of committing at least 80 murders in Cali in 2011. According to Colombia's most influential weekly magazine, Semana, there are over 1,700 assassins working for various groups in the city. 3.8 percent of street addresses account for 100 percent of homicides.

During 2012, there was a decrease in homicides, with 24 cases fewer than for the same period last year, and there were 294 fewer people injured, which means a reduction of 8% from a year previous. There were 323 fewer car thefts, i.e. a decrease of 21% over the same period of 2011. There were 152 fewer residential burglaries, which means a reduction of 17% from the same period of 2011. There was also strengthening in technology citywide by the installation of 254 security cameras.

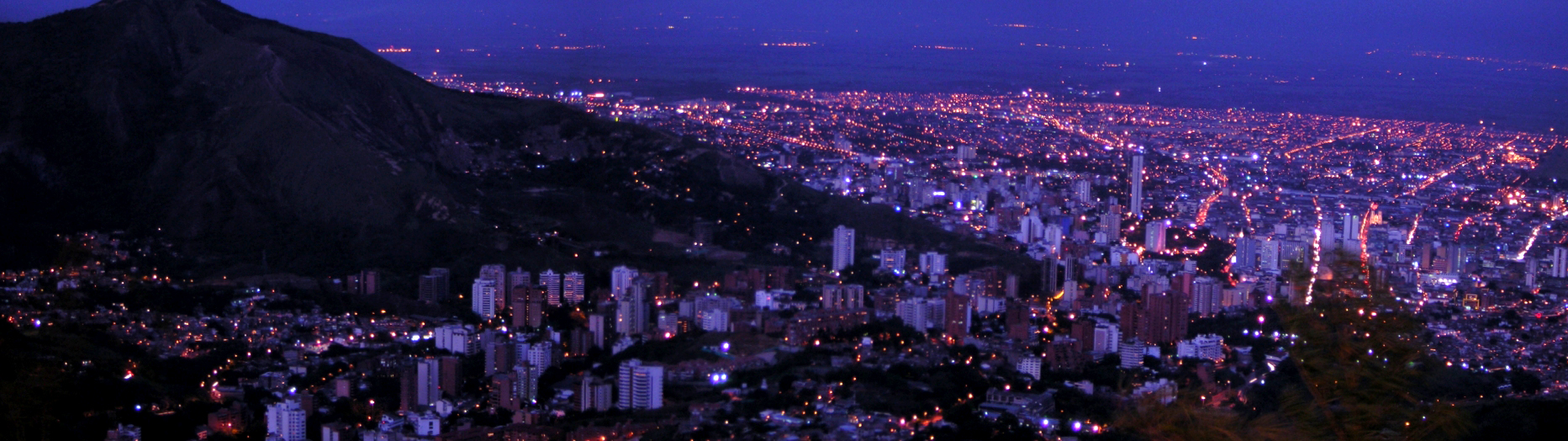
A 2007 panoramic showing Cali, main city in western Colombia.

== Politics ==
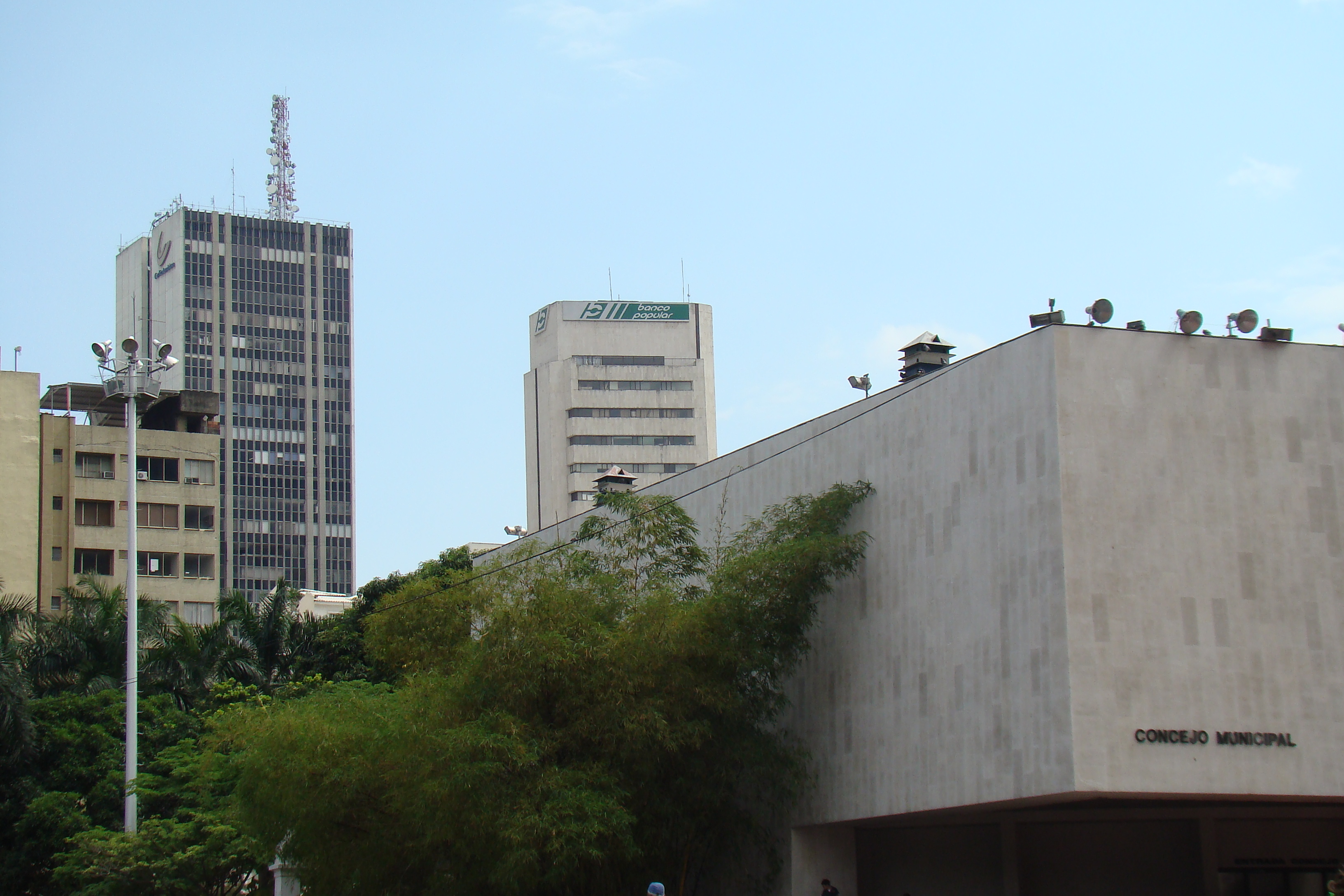
Concejo de Cali (City council).

Cali is governed by a mayor, elected to a four-year term. Several administrative departments and secretaries report to the mayor. Mayoral elections started in 1986, followed by elections for governors in 1992. Previously, all Colombian regional executive-branch leaders were appointed by the President of Colombia. The first elected mayor was Carlos Holmes Trujillo of the Liberal Party. Unlike other Colombian cities, Cali has not properly adapted to the new mayoral election system. The city has experienced unsuccessful terms under some of its elected mayors, two of which ended up being removed from office.

Elected Mayors of Cali
| Mayor | Started | Ended |
|---|---|---|
| Carlos Holmes Trujillo García | January 1988 | January 1990 |
| Germán Villegas Villegas | January 1990 | January 1992 |
| Rodrigo Guerrero Velasco | January 1992 | December 1994 |
| Mauricio Guzmán Cuevas | January 1995 | August 1997 |
| Julio César Martínez Payán | August 1997 | December 1997 |
| Ricardo H. Cobo Lloreda | January 1998 | December 2000 |
| John Maro Rodríguez Flórez | January 2001 | December 2003 |
| Apolinar Salcedo Caicedo | January 2004 | May 2007 |
| Sabas Ramiro Tafur Reyes | May 2007 | December 2007 |
| Jorge Ivan Ospina | January 2008 | December 2011 |
| Rodrigo Guerrero Velasco | January 2012 | December 2015 |
| Maurice Armitage | January 2016 | December 2019 |
| Jorge Ivan Ospina | January 2020 | December 2023 |
| Alejandro Eder | January 2024 | Incumbent |

The City Council is composed of 21 members, elected by citywide circumscription for four-year terms. There is no relation between the number of City Counselors and the number of 'comunas' of the city, which is a merely administrative division created to facilitate the city's management.

Cali has some decentralized agencies; the most important being:

- EMCALI: Energy, telecommunications, aqueduct and sewage systems services.
- Emsirva: Public waste management company for the city of Cali.
- Metrocali
- Calisalud
- Corfecali
- EMRU

== Education ==
A large part of the population relies on the public educational system. Schools are under municipal or departmental management, the former being the most common. The Municipal Secretary of Education manages 24% of the city's budget.

The city is endowed with the most sophisticated and high-quality secondary education institutions and universities in the region. Most universities are located in the south part of the city. Among the most prestigious are University of Valle (Public), Pontificia Universidad Javeriana (Private), and Universidad Icesi (Private).

=== Universities ===
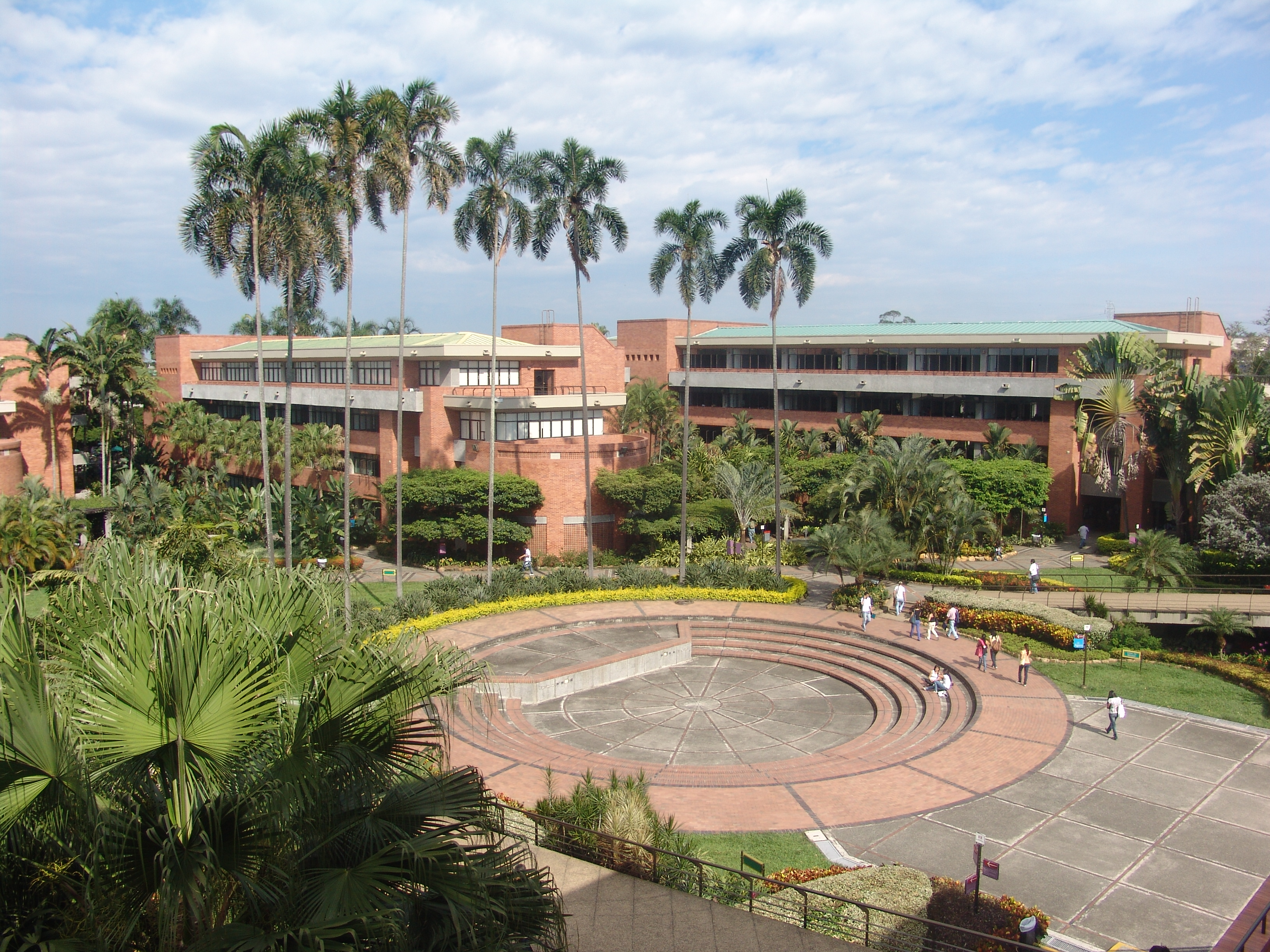
University Autónoma of Occidente (UAO).

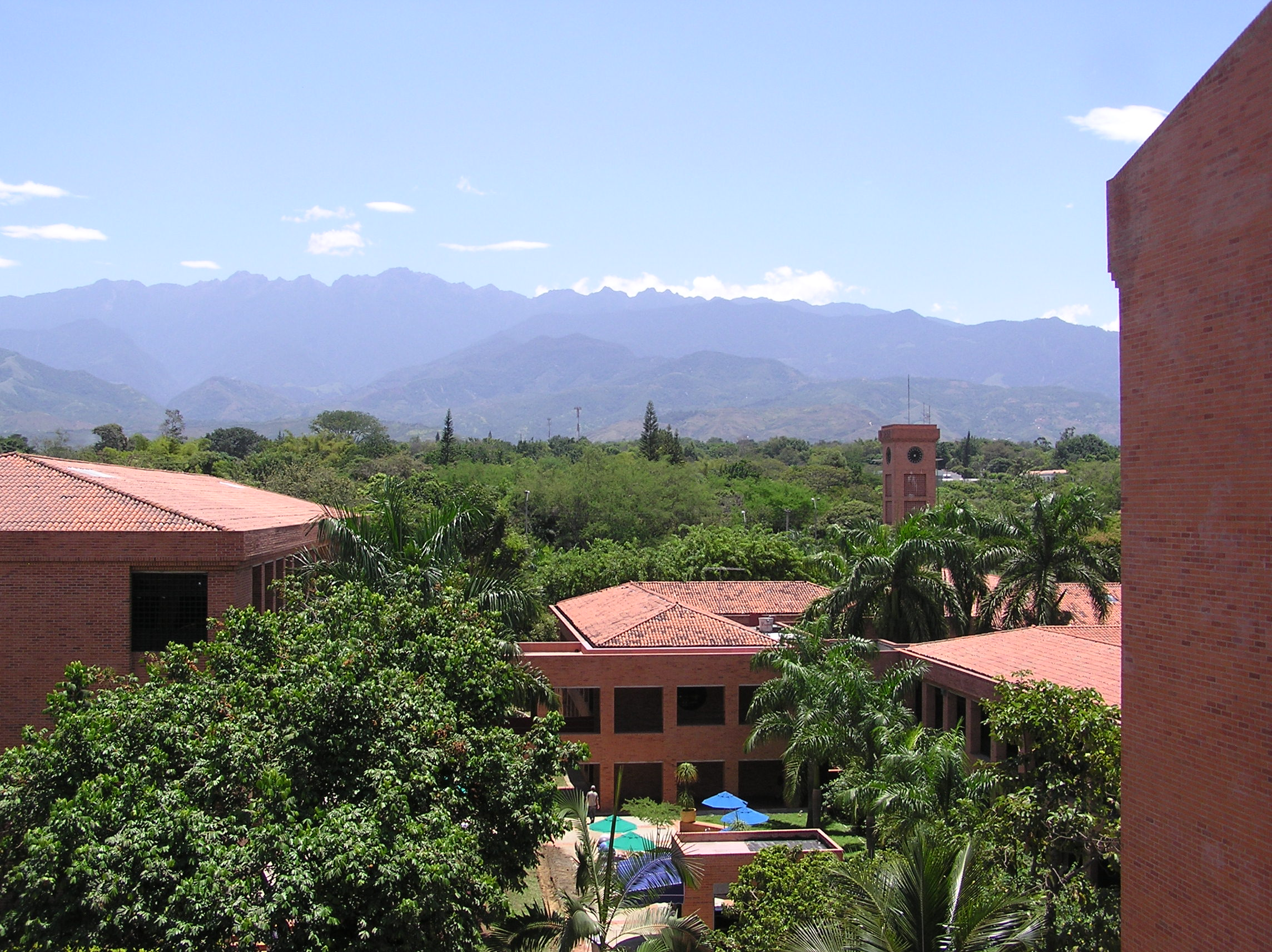
University Icesi and farallones of Cali.

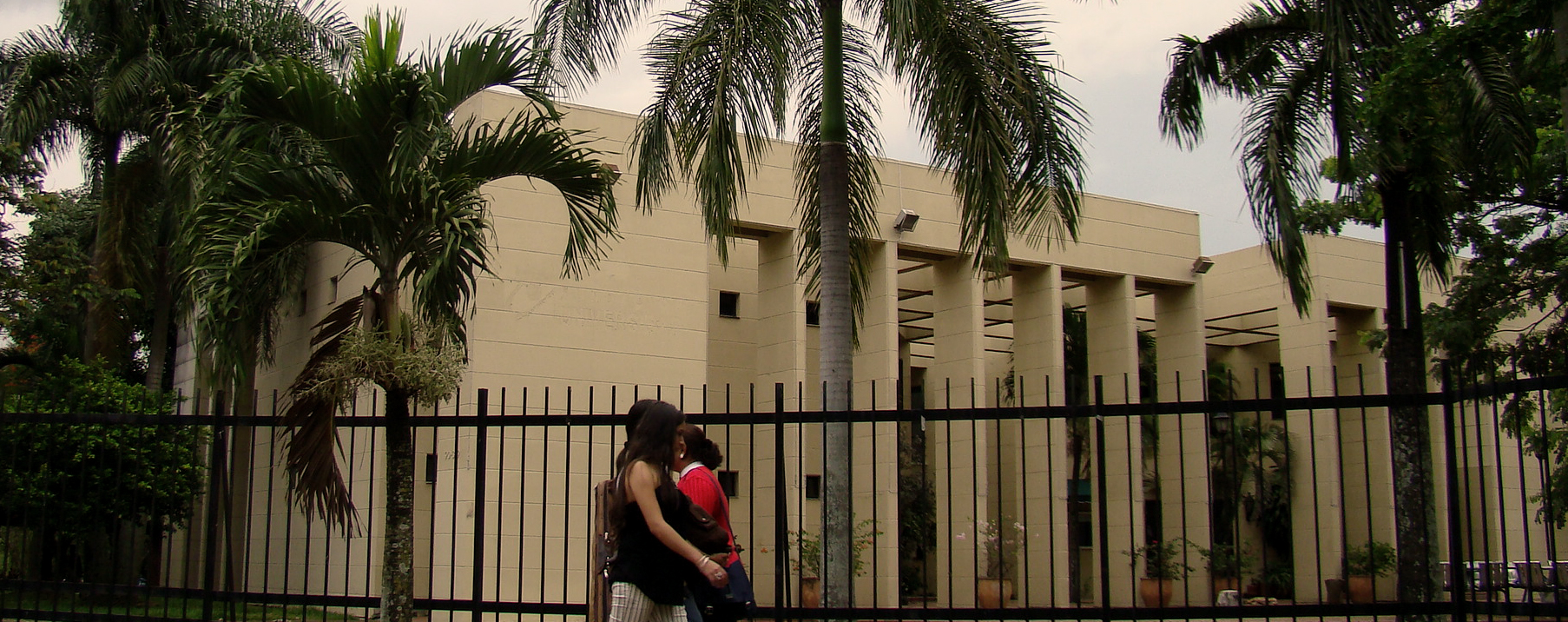
University of Valle.

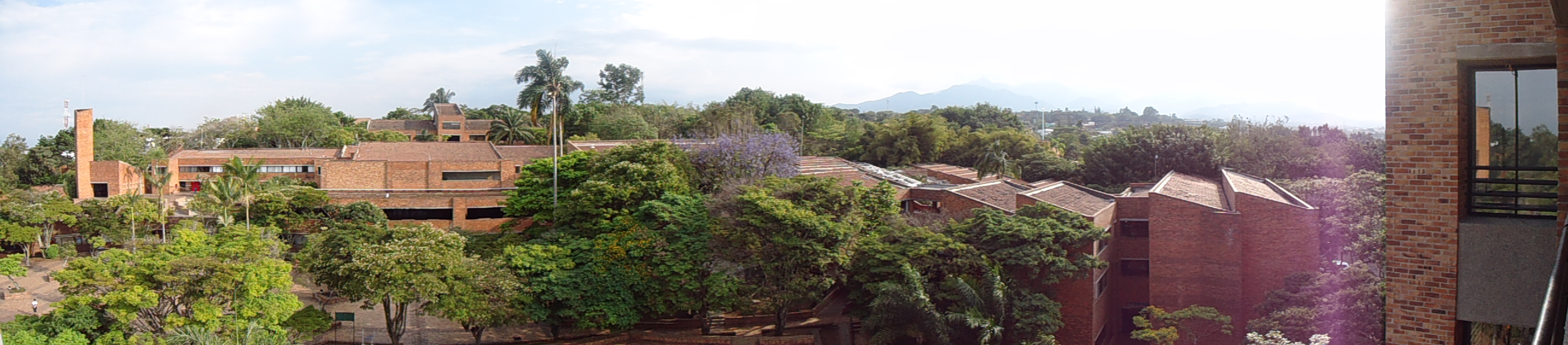
Pontificia University Javeriana.

- University of Valle (Public) It is the largest higher education institution by student population in the southwest of the country, and the third largest in Colombia, with more than 30,320 students. Its Faculties of Medicine, Engineering, Sciences, and Social Sciences rank as the best of the region. The first three rank at the top in the national level.
- Universidad Autónoma de Occidente (Private) Founded in 1975, this private institution has more than 7,400 students.
- Pontifical Xavierian University (Private) Founded in 1970, Pontifical Xavierian University Seccional Cali serves as the sectional campus of the Pontifical Xavierian University of Bogotá (PUJ by its Spanish acronym) is a private higher education institution which currently has more than 5,700 students enrolled in its seventeen undergraduate and twenty graduate programs offered by its faculties of engineering, economic and administrative sciences, humanistic and social sciences and health sciences. With over 36,000 printed books spanning a wide array of academic topics, the university's library is one of the biggest in the city. Beginning in 2010 the university will inaugurate its Medicine school bringing its total number of undergraduate degrees to seventeen. Pontifical Xavierian University is one of the universities in the city of Cali.
- Universidad Icesi (Private) University ICESI was founded in 1979 by regional entrepreneurs looking to solve the lack of highly skilled professionals in the areas relevant to their business. It offers undergraduates programs, specializations and masters. It has more than 2,950 students and a library with over 30,000 books. On the second semester of 2009, the university started its highly anticipated Medicine School, which will use the Valle del Lily Health Center as its training and educational facility.
- Universidad San Buenaventura (Private) Founded in 1970 by the Franciscan Order, it's a private institution of higher education that serves like sectional for University of St. Buenaventura of Bogotá.
- Free University of Colombia
- Universidad Santiago de Cali (Private) The University Santiago de Cali also known as La Santiago or USC is a private corporation and institution of higher education founded in 1959.
- National Learning Service (SENA)
- Antonio Jose Camacho University Institute (Public)
- Corporación Universitaria Centro Superior - UNICUCES (Private)
- Escuela Nacional Del Deporte (Mixed) Founded in 1984, the Escuela Nacional Del Deporte (Sports National School) is, along with Politecnico Jaime Isaza Cadavid (Medellín), the most important institution in Colombia for sport education, physical therapy, and sports science.
- San Martin University
- La Manzana del Saber Located in the south of the city, La Manzana del Saber is today the most important educational project in Cali. There is already the Natural Science Museum, the "Abracadabra" Interactive Museum, the Jorge Garcés Borrero public library, and the Pedagogical Research and Innovation Centre. The project construction phase has taken many years; the demolition of a whole city block will be undertaken to build the complex.

== Arts and culture ==
=== Cultural centers ===
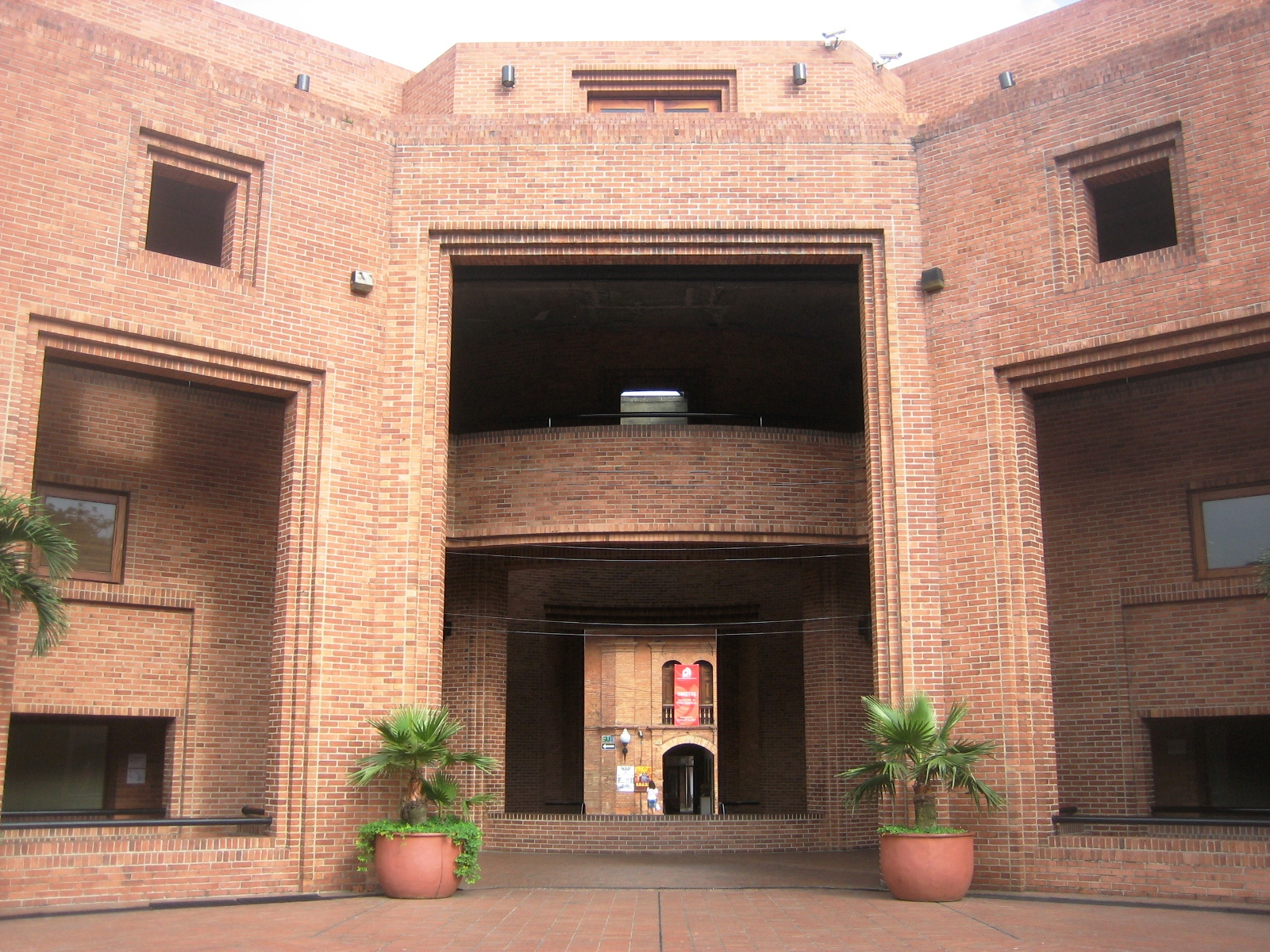
Cultural center

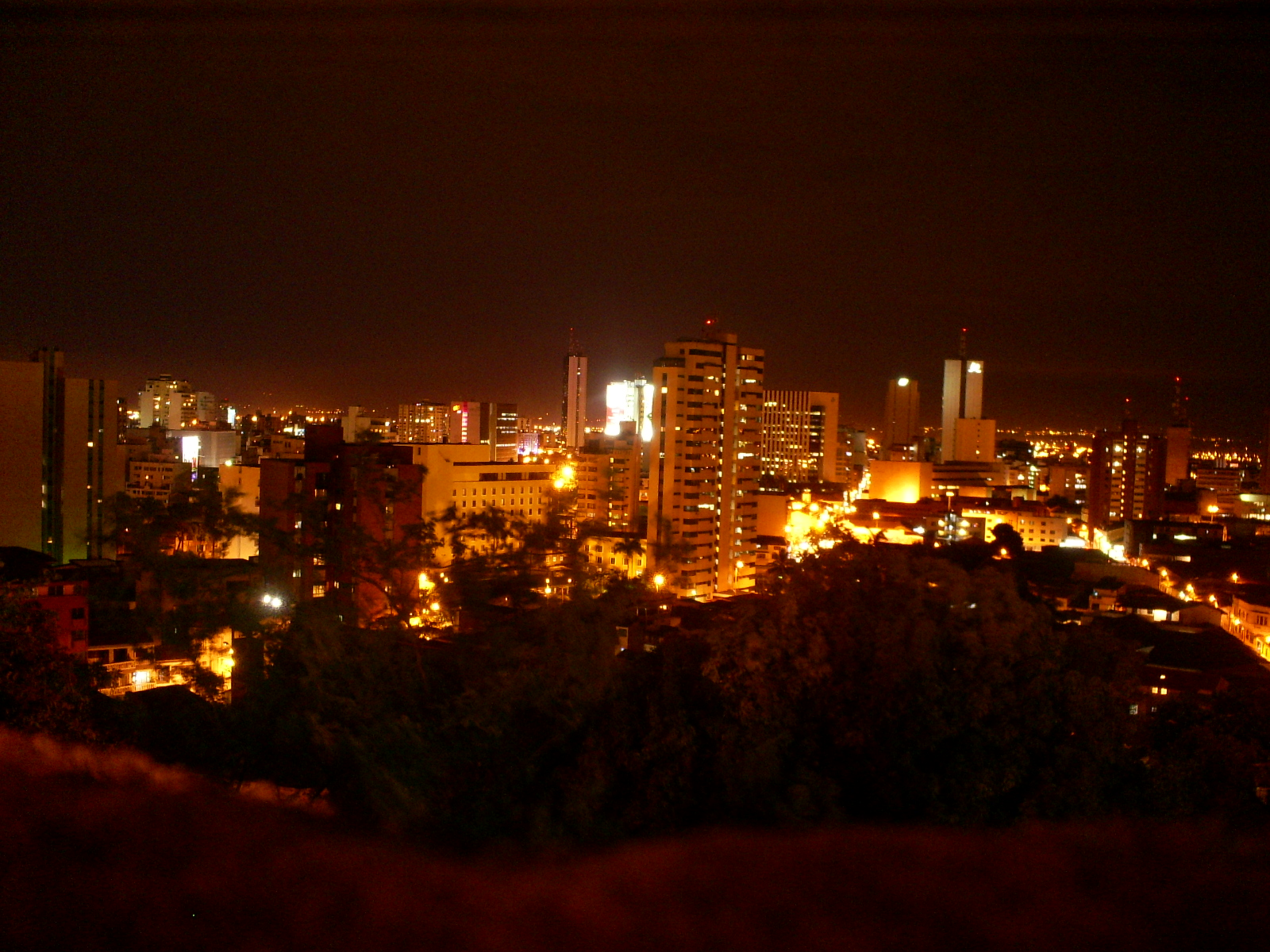
Cali at night

- Casa de la cultura Proartes. Since 1871 this house has been a great influence in the culture in Cali. The building was restored in 1991 and it contains exhibition saloons, scenarios and a cinema.
- Centro cultural de Cali. Its design was under the charge of the famous Colombian architect Rogelio Salmona, who built as well the Torres del Parque in Bogotá and several other buildings. Since 1997 it is considered the cultural center in the city and headquarters of the Municipal secretaries of tourism and culture.
- Lugar a Dudas. The cultural center dedicated to contemporary art was created under the direction of Oscar Muñoz. It's a place offering exhibition saloons, weekly film screenings, a contemporary art focused library and residencies for both local and international artist, amongst many other things.

=== Museums ===
- La Tertulia Museum, an art museum
- Calima Gold Museum
- Museo Arqueológico La Merced
- Museo Religioso y Colonial de San Francísco
- Museo del Oro Calima from the Rebublica bank
- Museo Arqueologico de la Universidad del Valle
- Museo Departamental de Ciencias Naturales
- Museo Nacional del Transporte
- Museo de Arte Religioso

=== La Feria de Cali (The Cali Fair) ===
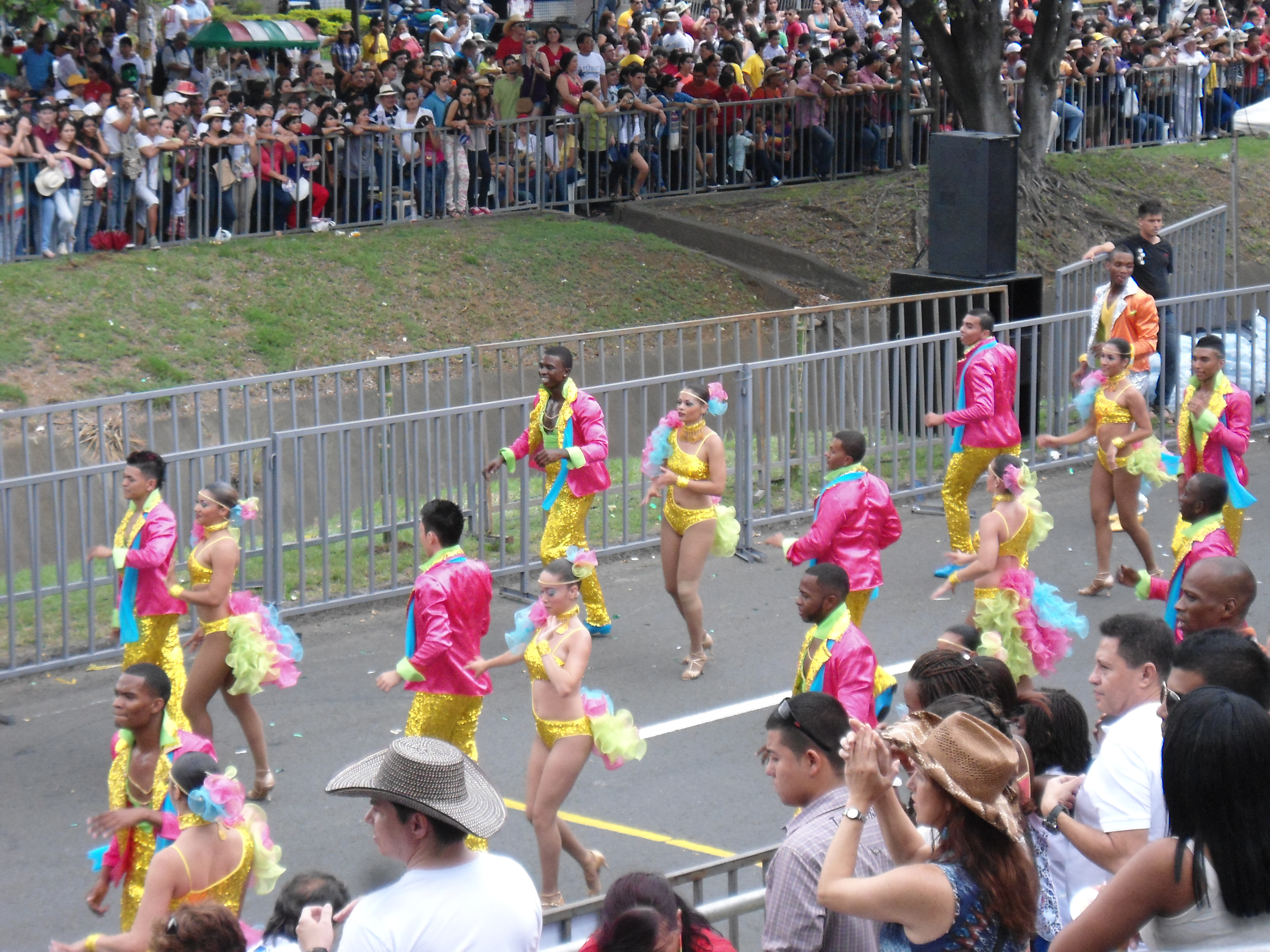
Feria de Cali.

La "Feria de Cali" (The Cali Fair), also known as La Feria de la Caña (Sugar Cane Fair), is the most important cultural event in the city, celebrated since 1957. It is celebrated every year from 25 to 30 December. The fair is not only the most important event for the cultural identity of the citizens, but it also stimulates the economic development of the city by significantly increasing tourism and seasonal employment, providing opportunities for independent merchants to sell their products during the events, and encouraging the improvement of the city's infrastructure. Nowadays, the fair hosts several national and international celebrities during the music festivals and concerts.

=== Salsa music ===
Cali is also known as the Salsa Capital "Capital de la Salsa" given the city's love for that genre of music. In early July there is the Summer Salsa Festival which lasts for one week. It usually includes concerts by some of the world's great salsa bands as well as dance shows and "melomano" competitions in which salsa connoisseurs try to outdo each other by digging deep into the archives of salsa music and related sounds to find and reveal long lost tunes. On any night of the week small salsa clubs offer a variety of Afro and Caribbean beats. Furthermore, the last Friday of every month, the city has an event known as "Delirio", already internationally known with the most spectacular salsa shows presented, "Las Vegas" style.

=== Events ===
- Salsodromo (Salsa Marathon)
- Carnaval de Cali Viejo (Old Cali's Carnival)
- Desfile de Autos Clasicos y Antiguos (Classic and Antique Cars Parade)
- Superconcierto
- Chiquiferia (Little Fair)
- Cabalgata (Horse Parade)
- Reinado Panamericano de la Caña de Azúcar (Pan American Reign of Sugar Cane)
- Tascas

== Sports ==
At a professional level, Cali hosts only football teams. At the amateur level there are Basketball, Football, Volleyball, and other sports. Nationally, Cali's athletes compete with Bogotá's and Medellín's in most sport tournaments and championships.

Cali has two main athletic events, a mid-year half marathon 1/2 Maraton de Cali and a December 10k race called Carrera del Río Cali.

=== Colombia's sports capital ===
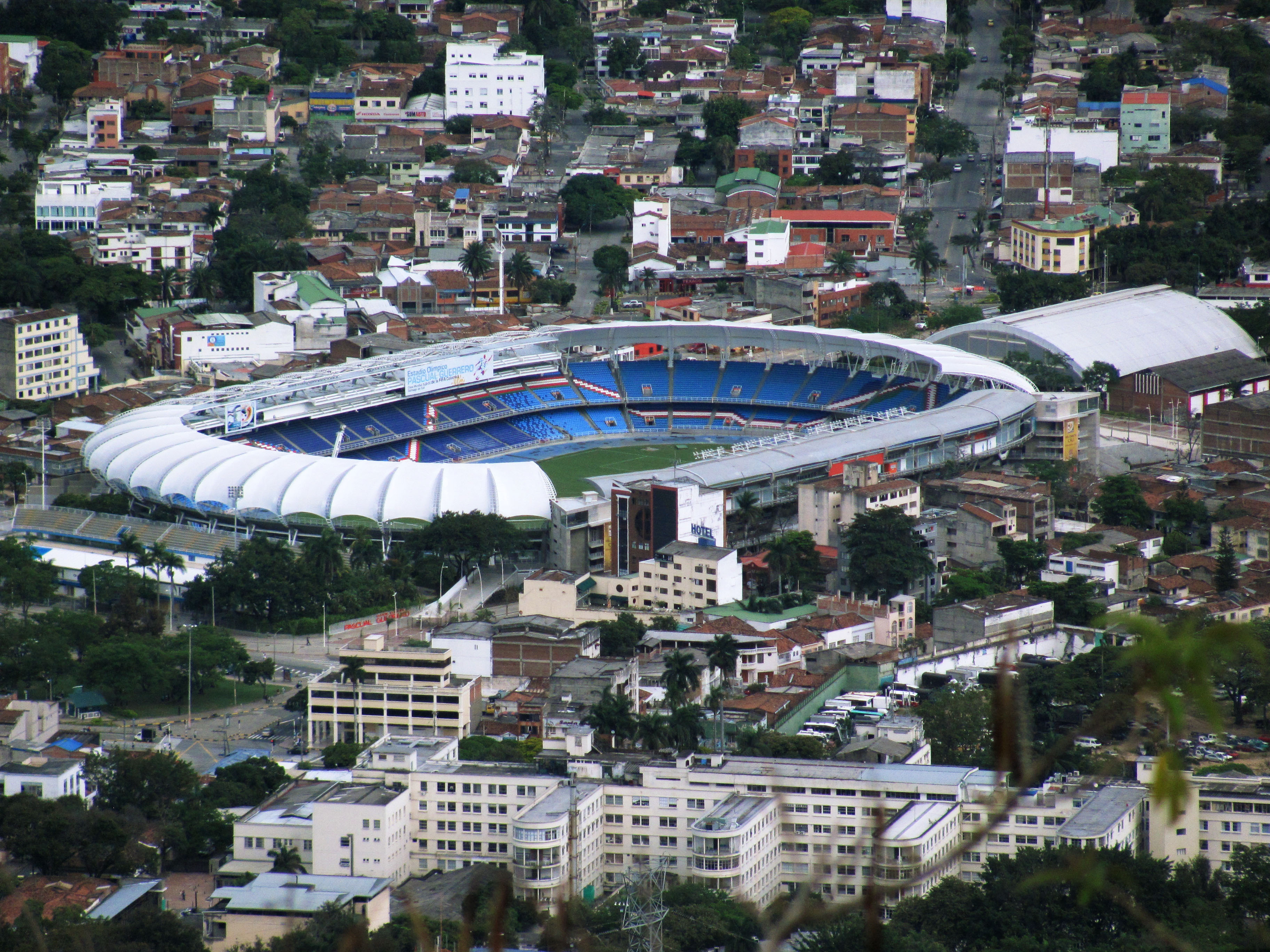
Pascual Guerrero Stadium seen from the Cristo Rey

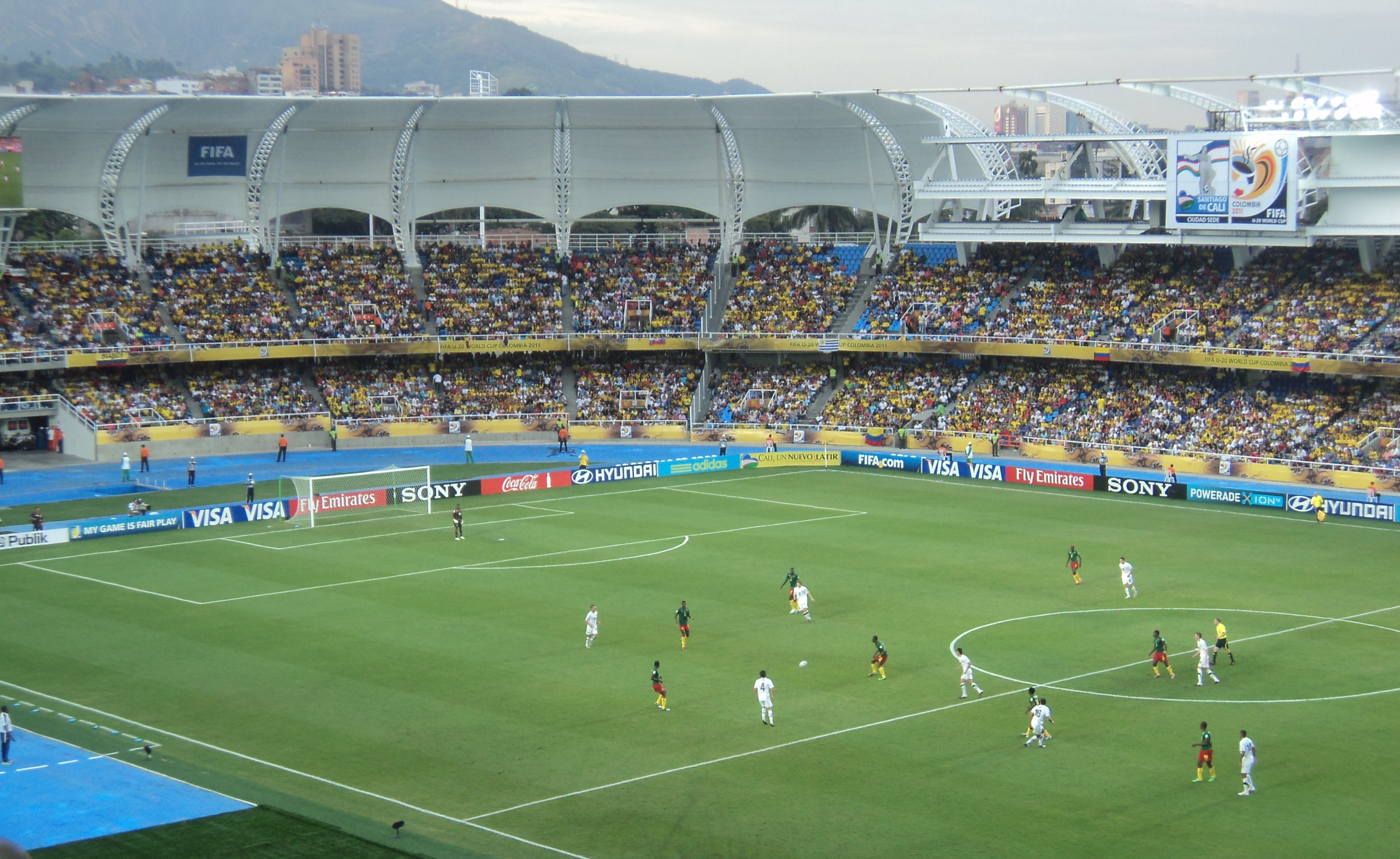
Estadio Olímpico Pascual Guerrero Cali, during 2011 FIFA U-20 World Cup

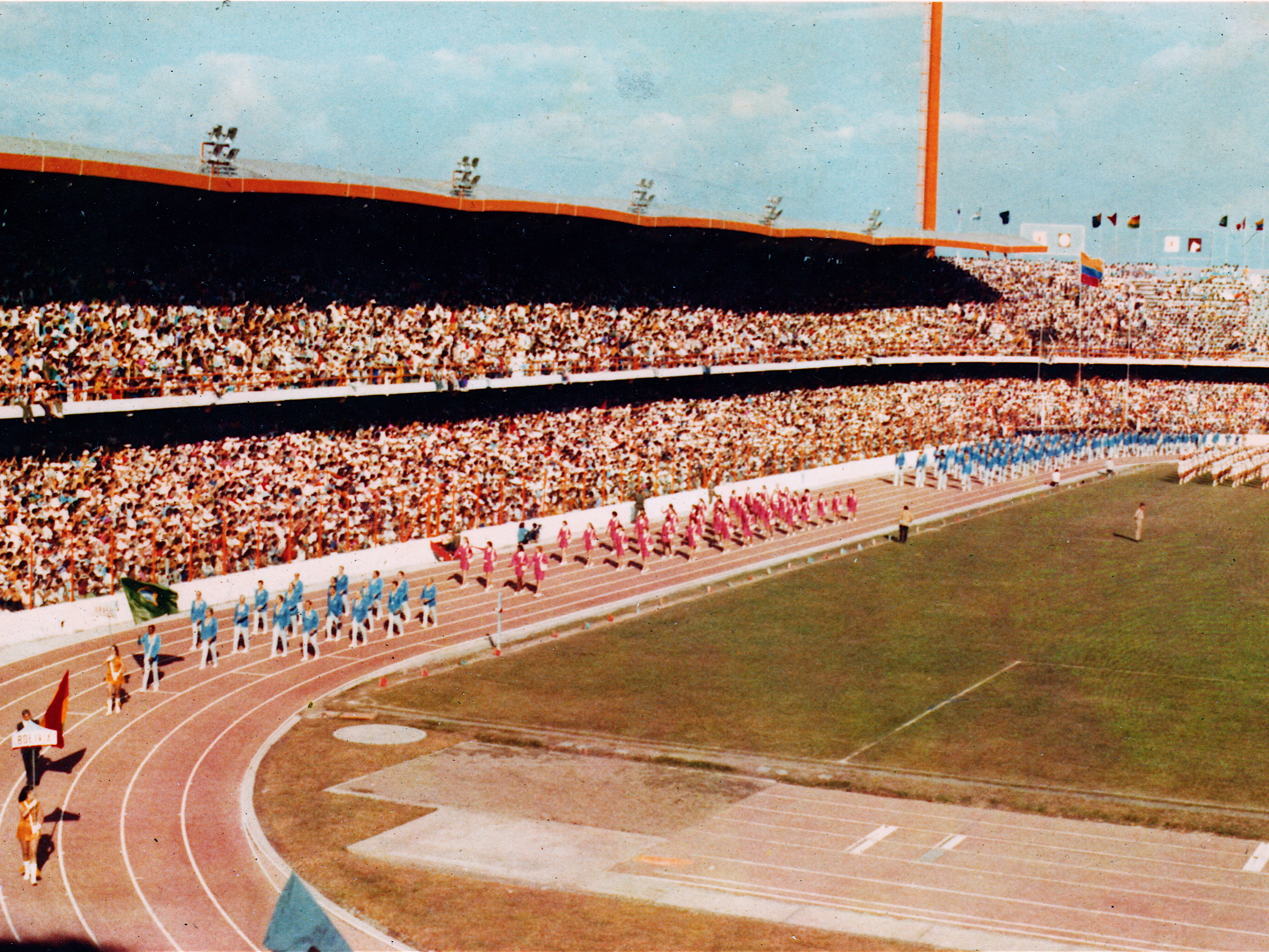
Opening Ceremony of the 1971 Pan American Games

Santiago de Cali is recognized as the sports capital of Colombia. It is the first Colombian city to have hosted the Pan American Games (see 1971 Pan American Games), and has also won the National Olympic Games more than any other region in Colombia. The city also has one of the most developed sport infrastructures in the country. Many sporting events have taken place in the city.

Cali has one football stadium: Estadio Olímpico Pascual Guerrero, which is currently home of América de Cali, Atlético F.C., and Boca Juniors de Cali, and was home of Deportivo Cali until 2015 when they moved to Estadio Deportivo Cali, located in nearby Palmira. Deportivo Cali is the only Colombian football club that owns its stadium, since all other football stadiums in Colombia are government-owned. Other important places of sporting activity in the city are "Coliseo El Pueblo", a covered arena center used for all types of events which hosted the 2016 FIFA Futsal World Cup, and Coliseo Evangelista Mora, mainly used for basketball. Cali will host the inaugural Junior Pan American Games in 2021.

=== Infrastructure ===
Cali's infrastructure has permitted it to host several major international sports competitions such as the 1971 Pan American Games, numerous Games of the Pacific, the final phase of the 1982 World basketball championship, the 1999 World's Roller Hockey Championships, women's basketball and swimming events, Pan American Speed-Track Cycling Championships, and most recently the World's Roller Speed Skating Championships. Cali was the host city of the World Games 2013.

- Pascual Guerrero Olímpic stadium
- El Pueblo Arena
- Polideportivo de El Vallado
- Unidad Deportiva Panamericana
- Velódromo Alcides Nieto Patiño
- Gimnasio Evangelista Mora
- Patinódromo Los Diputados
- Iván Vassilev Todorov Arena

=== Football ===
Santiago de Cali is home to football clubs Deportivo Cali and América de Cali. Many well-known football players were either born in Cali or have played for one of its clubs. including Willington Ortiz, Carlos Valderrama, Ántony de Ávila, Álex Escobar, Julio César Falcioni, Jorge Orosmán da Silva, Jorge Bermúdez, Giovanni Hernández, Hugo Rodallega, Mario Yepes, Faryd Mondragón, Adolfo Valencia, Óscar Córdoba and Johan Mojica.

According to CONMEBOL, América ranks second and Deportivo Cali third in the Colombian national ranking, which ranks itself third in the CONMEBOL ranking. América was ranked as the world's second best club in 1996 by the IFFHS (International Federation of Football History & Statistics) and 35th in the All-Time Club World Ranking of the IFFHS. Cali is the Colombian city having hosted the most Colombian first division finals, with 40 matches being played in the stadium. América has won 15 titles, and has been runner-up 7 times. Deportivo Cali has won 10 titles and ended as runner-up 14 times. They have played finals against each other three times. In the early 1950s, current second-tier team Boca Juniors lost two finals.

=== Basketball and bullfighting ===
There is a basketball team in the city of Cali currently. It is known as Team Cali. In addition, basketball is the second-most played sport in the city. Basketball is a preferred sport at the city center location "La Carrera del Cholado". Football still surpasses basketball in sport popularity. Bullfighting is staged during the Cali Fair which is held in December. It is anticipated by many citizens in Cali, as well as by many people in all Colombia. The bullfighting ring is called Plaza de Toros de Cañaveralejo, with a capacity of 16,000 and located in the southwest of the city.

=== Other sports ===
Rugby, tennis, swimming, archery, and ultimate are also played in Cali. The IAAF World Youth Championships in Athletics was hosted in Cali in July 2015. Cali also hosted the 2015 Underwater Rugby World Cup.

== Nicknames ==
- (in Spanish) Capital Mundial de la Salsa (Salsa Capital of the World)
- (in Spanish) La Sucursal del Cielo (Subsidiary of Heaven)
- (in Spanish) La Sultana del Valle (the Empress of the Valley)
- (in English) Cali Beach
- (in English) Caliwood

== Twin towns – sister cities ==
- Honolulu, United States
- Montevideo, Uruguay

Cali also have friendly relations with:

- İzmir, Turkey
- Lima, Peru
- Tianjin, China

== Gallery ==
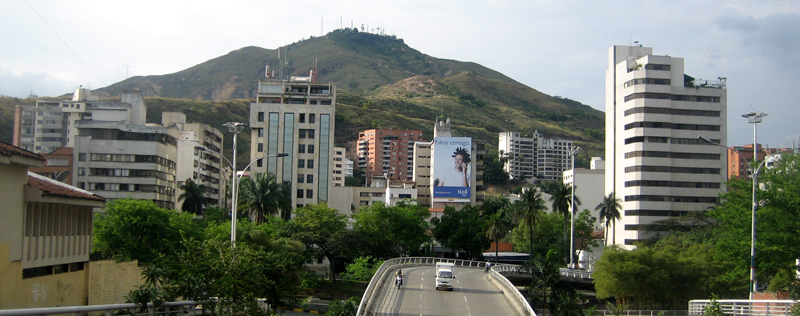
Tres Cruces Hill

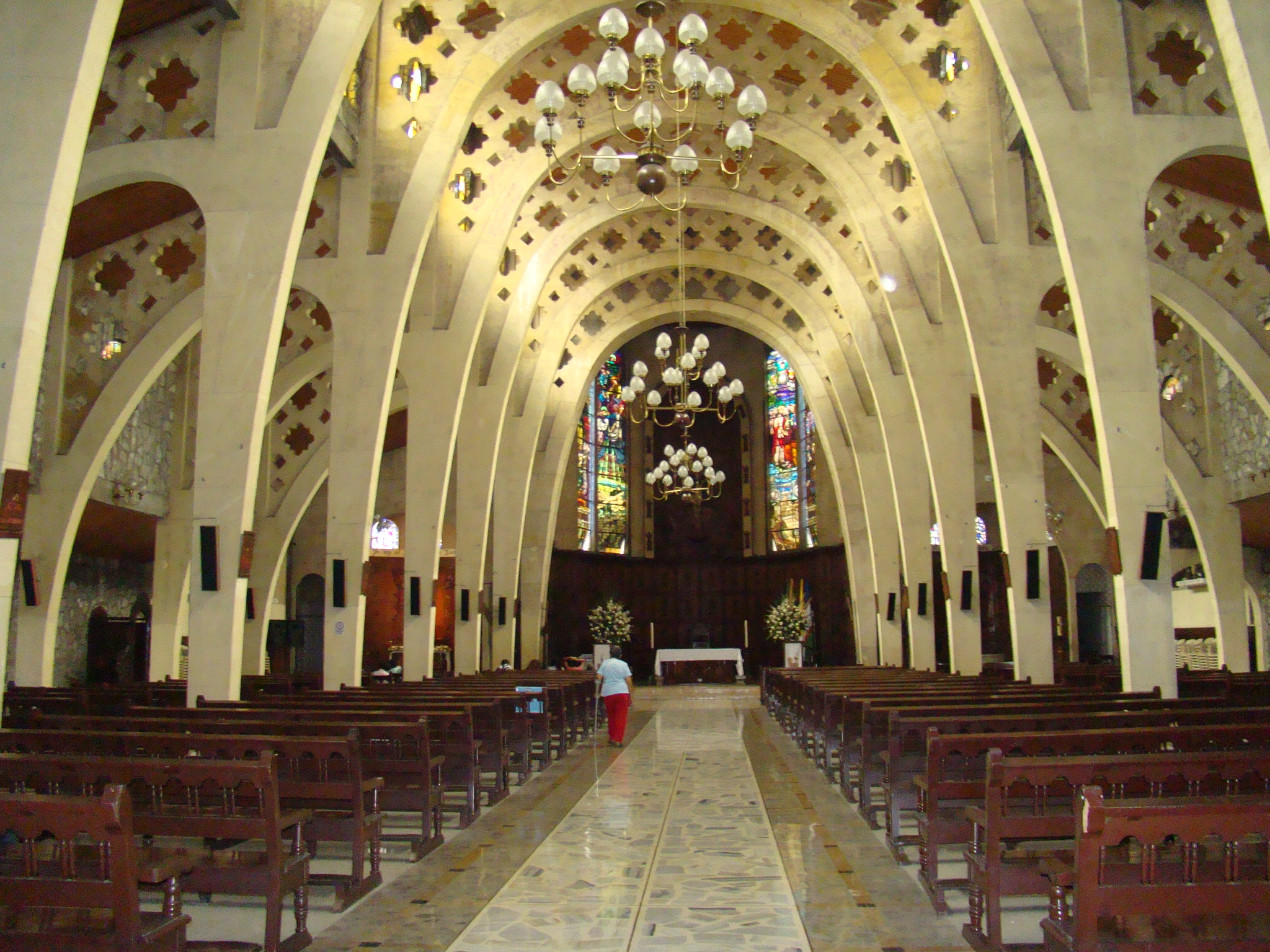
San Fernando church interior

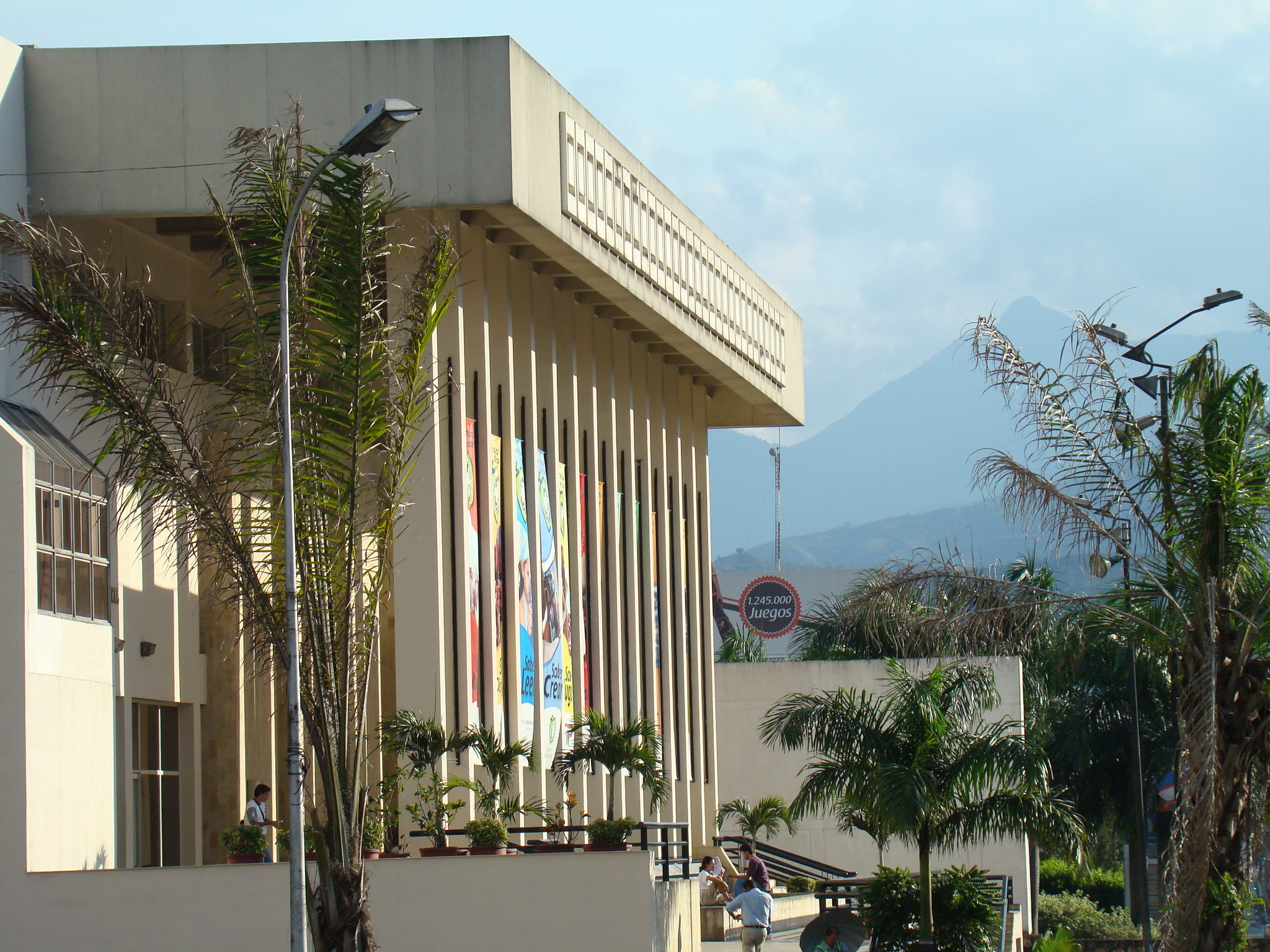
(Library) Biblioteca departamental Jorge Garcés Borrero

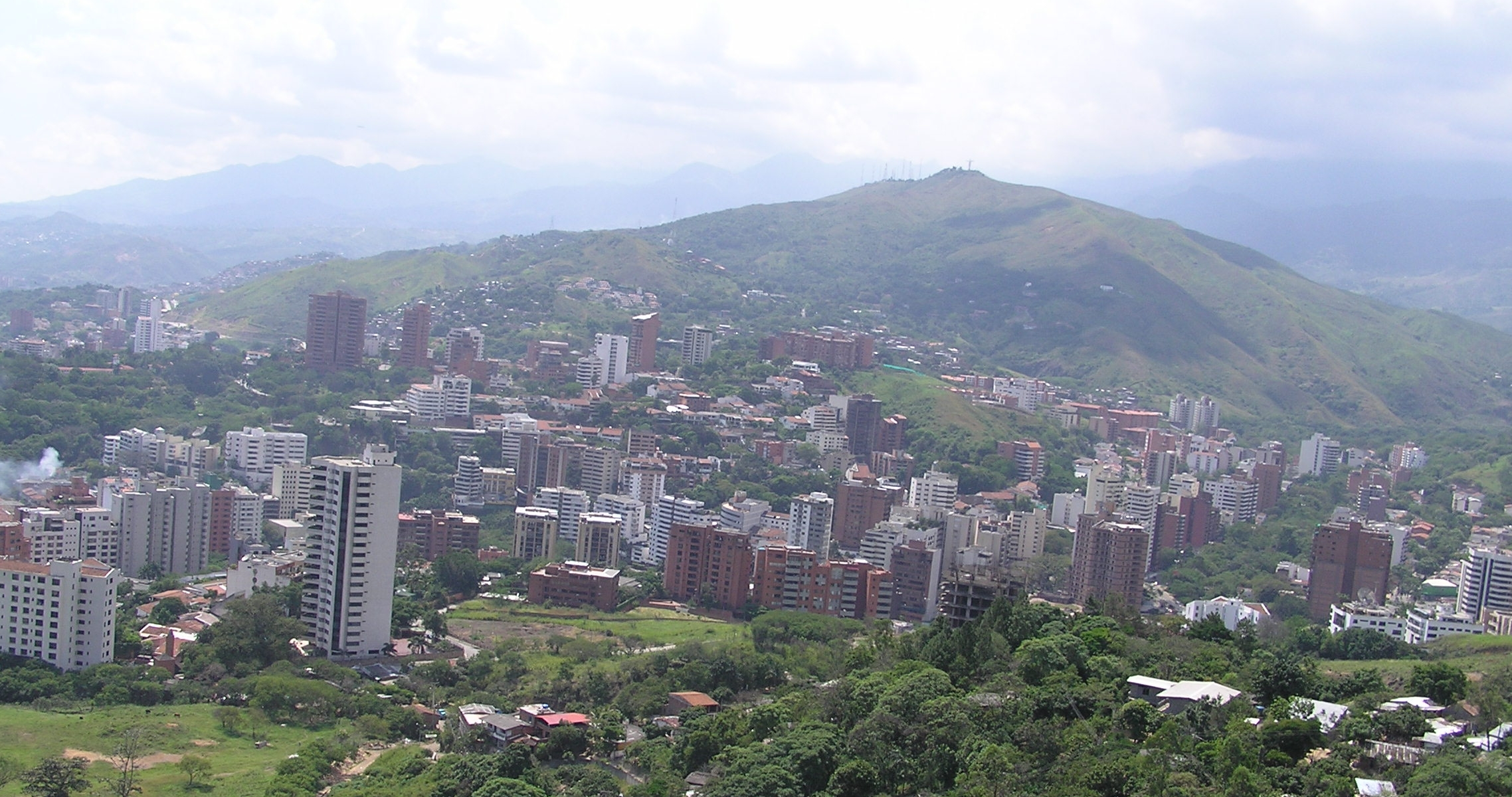
Western Cali, looking Cristo Rey Hill

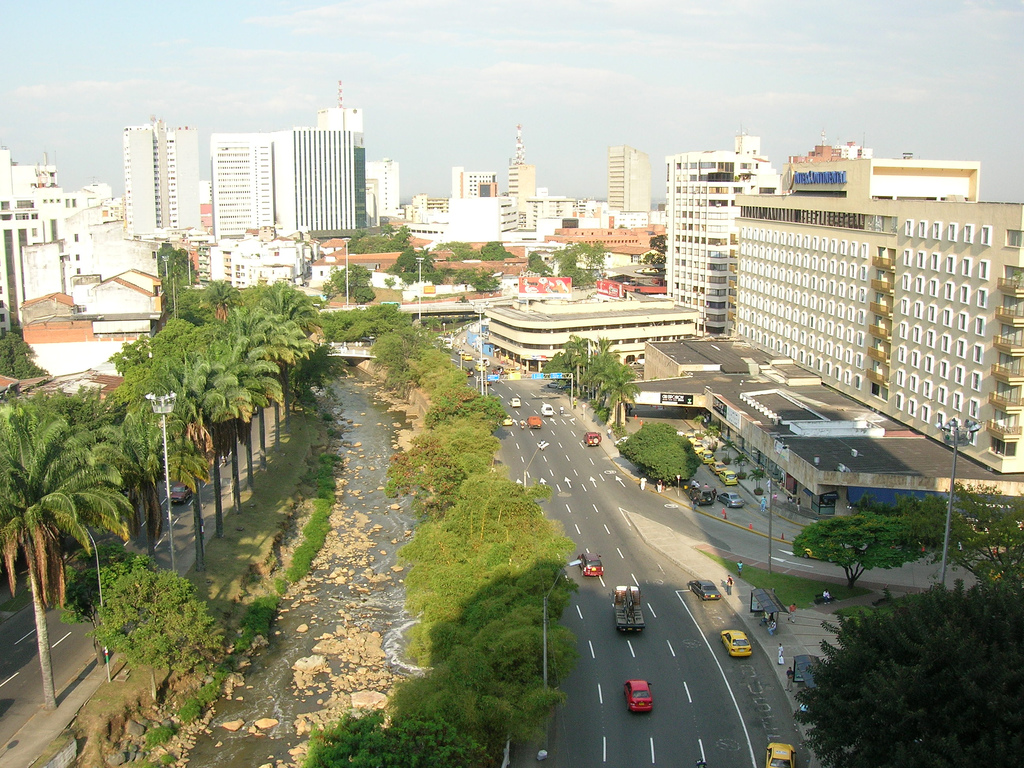
Cali river

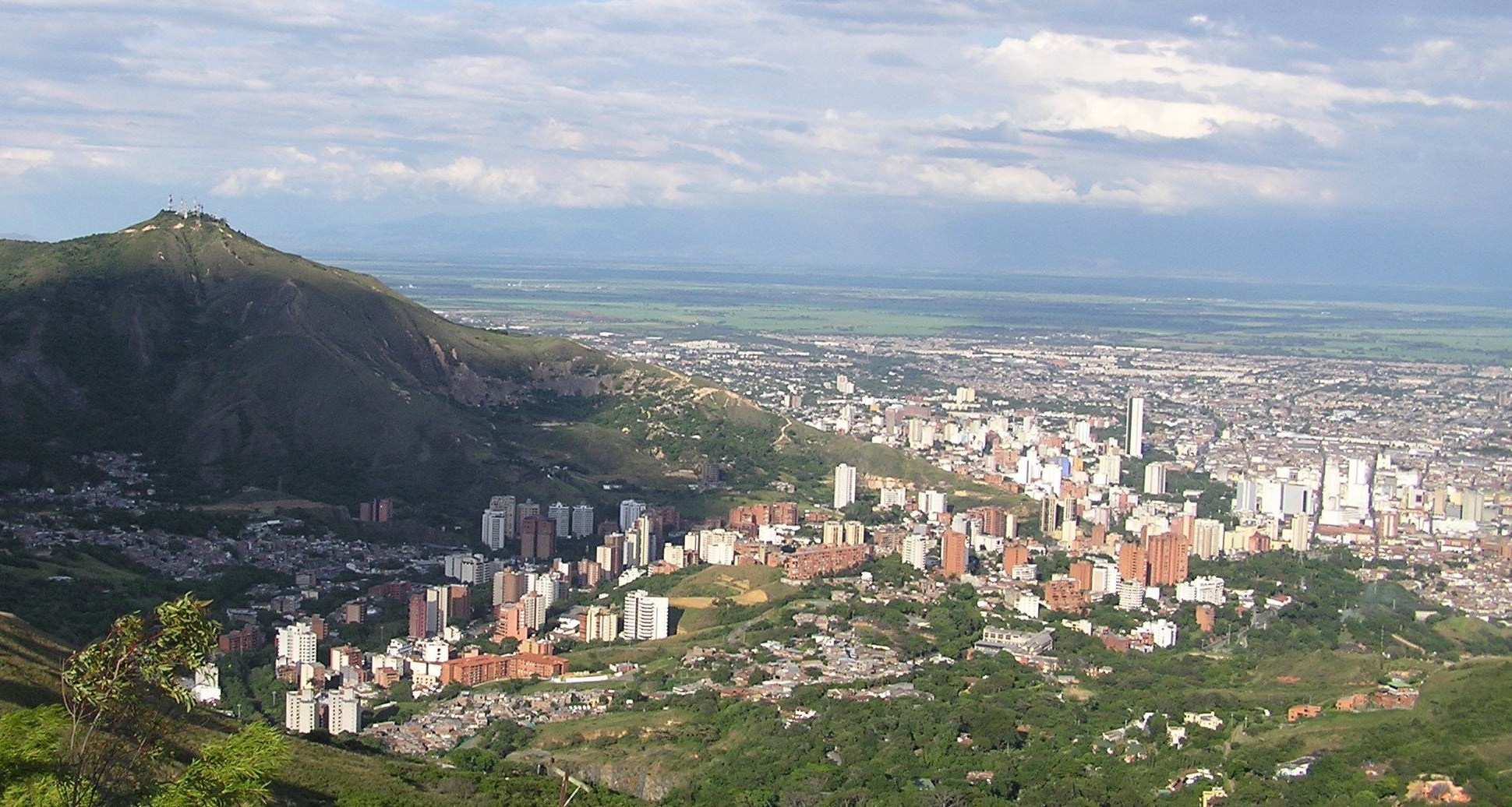
Skyline picture taken from Cristo Rey Hill

== Notable people ==
- Andrés Caicedo (1951–1977), writer
- Carolina Ramírez (born 1983), actress
- Juan Castilla (born 2004), footballer
- María Helena Doering (born 1962), actress
- Lupe Fuentes (born 1987), house music producer
- José Gilberto Montoya, medical researcher
- Hannah Gonzalez (born 1990), disc jockey of electronic music, musical producer and model
- César Mora (born 1961), musician
- Álvaro Ríos Poveda (born 1974), scientist
- Margarita Ortega (born 1973), television presenter and actress
- Viviana Serna (born 1990), actress
- Óscar Tunjo (born 1996), racing driver
- Carlos Valdes (born 1989), actor
- Gustavo Yacamán (born 1991), racing driver
- Mario Yepes (born 1976), footballer
- Yung Filly (born 1995), YouTuber and musician
- Kike Santander (born 1960), composer and producer
- Rebeca Uribe Bone (1917–2017), Colombian chemical engineer
- Gilberto Rodríguez Orejuela (1939–2022), drug lord
- Miguel Rodríguez Orejuela (born 1943), drug lord
- Mery Valencia (born 1953), drug lord
- Paulina Gálvez (born 1980), Miss International 1999
- Phanor Arizabaleta-Arzayus (1938-2016), drug lord
- Victor Patiño-Fomeque (born 1959), drug lord
- Beto Pérez, choreographer
- Bernardo Redin (born 1963), footballer
- Óscar Córdoba (born 1970), footballer
- Faryd Mondragón (born 1971), footballer
- Duván Zapata (born 1991), footballer
- Jeison Murillo (born 1992), footballer
- Natasha Klauss, (born 1976), actress, businesswoman

== In popular culture ==
Ciudad Delirio is a 2014 romantic comedy/drama feature film set in Cali, with a plot centred on its salsa dancing culture.
