= List of Colombian artists =

This is a list of Colombian artists. Colombian art has 3,500 years of history and covers a wide range of media and styles ranging from Quimbaya gold craftwork and Spanish Baroque devotional painting to modern Colombian cinema and conceptual art movements.

== A ==
- Julio Abril, sculptor and painter
- Ruvén Afanador (born 1959), photographer
- Olga de Amaral (born 1932), textile artist
- Débora Arango (1907–2005), painter
- Natalia Arbelaez (born 1983), American-born Columbian ceramicist, sculptor
- Rodrigo Arenas Betancourt (1919–1995), sculptor

== B ==
- Fernando Botero (1932–2023), painter and sculptor

== C ==
- Antonio Caro, painter and mixed media artist
- Natalia Castañeda Arbelaez (born 1982), painter
- Gregorio Vasquez de Arce y Ceballos, painter
- Olga de Chica (1921–2016), Primitivist painter
- Juan Fernando Cobo painter and sculptor
- Antonio Acero de la Cruz (c. 1600–1668), painter and poet
- Claudia Cuesta, installation artist

== D ==
- Danilo Dueñas (born 1956), painter

== E ==
- Juan Manuel Echavarría (born 1947), video and photography
- Jesús María Espinosa (1908–1995), painter
- Miguel de la Espriella (born 1947), painter and sculptor

== F ==
- Pedro José Figueroa, portrait painter
- Nancy Friedemann-Sánchez, mixed media

== G ==
- Alberto Gómez Gómez, muralist, painter and printmaker
- Miguel Gómez, photographer
- Pedro Nel Gómez, muralist
- Beatriz Gonzalez, painter and sculptor
- Nadia Granados (born 1978), performance artist
- Enrique Grau, painter

== H ==
- Manuel Hernández Gómez (1928–2014), abstract painter

== J ==
- Ben Jones (born 1977), cartoonist

== L ==
- Mario Londoño, painter
- Germán Londoño, painter and sculptor
- Sandra Llano-Mejía (born 1951), multimedia artist, video artist

== M ==
- Adriana Marmorek (born 1969), multimedia artist
- Santiago Martínez Delgado (1906–1954), muralist, sculptor, art historian
- Leo Matiz (1917–1998), photographer
- Oscar Murillo, painter
- Sara Modiano (1951–2010), multimedia artist

== N ==
- Édgar Negret (1920–2012), painter
- Alonso Neira Martinez, sculptor

== O ==
- Alejandro Obregón (1920–1992), painter
- Mario Opazo, video and performance artist
- Nadín Ospina, artist
- Gloria Ortiz-Hernandez (born 1943), artist

== R ==
- Eduardo Ramírez Villamizar (1923–2004), painter and sculptor
- Omar Rayo, painter and sculptor
- Pedro Restrepo (1920–2012), painter, historian
- Ruby Rumié (born 1958), contemporary artist
- Pedro Ruiz (born 1957), painter and conceptual artist

== S ==
- Doris Salcedo (born 1958), conceptual artist
- Andrés de Santa Maria (1860–1945), painter
- Viviana Spinosa contemporary artist

== U ==
- Federico Uribe, mixed media artist

== V ==
- Samuel Vásquez, artist

== See also ==
- List of Colombian musicians
- List of Colombian writers
- List of Colombian women artists
