= List of Colombian women artists =

This is a list of women artists who were born in Colombia or whose artworks are closely associated with that country.

== A ==
- Liliana Angulo Cortés (born 1974), painter, sculptor
- Débora Arango (1907–2005), painter, ceramist
- Natalia Arbelaez (born 1983), American born Colombian ceramist, sculptor

== B ==
- Delfina Bernal (born 1941), painter, multimedia artist
- Graciela Bustos, contemporary artist
- Feliza Bursztyn (1933–1982), sculptor

== C ==
- María Fernanda Cardoso (born 1963), Colombian-Australian painter, sculptor, illustrator
- Natalia Castañeda Arbelaez (born 1982), painter
- Olga de Chica (1921–2016), painter
- Esperanza Cortes (born 1957), Colombian-American visual artist

== D ==
- Erika Diettes (born 1978), portrait photographer, fine art photographer

== F ==
- Nancy Friedemann-Sánchez, mixed media

== G ==
- Nadia Granados (born 1978), performance artist

== L ==
- Sandra Llano-Mejía (born 1951), multimedia artist, video artist

== M ==
- Adriana Marmorek (born 1969), multimedia artist
- Sara Modiano (1951–2010), artist

== O ==
- Gloria Ortiz-Hernandez, artist
- Yen Ospina, Colombian-American muralist

== P ==
- Maria E. Piñeres (born 1966), textile artist

== R ==
- Claudia Rueda (active since 2000s), illustrator
- Ruby Rumié (born 1958), mixed media artist

== S ==
- Doris Salcedo (born 1958), sculptor
- Fanny Sanín (born 1938), abstract painter
- Viviana Spinosa (born 1984), contemporary artist

== T ==
- Lucy Tejada (1920–2011), painter
- Maria Clara Trujillo (born 1958), painter, sculptor

== See also ==
- List of Colombian artists
