= Gloria Ortiz =

Gloria Ortiz may refer to

- Gloria Stella Diaz Ortiz, Colombian politician, born 1964
- Gloria Stella Ortiz Delgado, Colombian jurist, born 1969
- Gloria Ortiz-Hernandez, Colombian artist, born 1943
