= Casseus =

Casseus is a Haitian surname. It may refer to:

- Frantz Casseus, Haitian guitarist
- Gabriel Casseus, American actor and screenwriter
- Marlie Casseus, Haitian woman with polyostotic fibrous dysplasia

== See also ==
- Cassius (disambiguation)
