= Magnenat =

Magnenat is a surname. Notable people with the surname include:

- Gabrielle Gachet, née Gabrielle Magnenat (born 1980), Swiss ski mountaineer
- Nadia Magnenat Thalmann, Swiss-Canadian computer graphics scientist and robotician
- Roland Magnenat (1922–1991), Swiss weightlifter
- Sergio Trujillo Magnenat (1911–1999), Colombian painter, illustrator and sculptor
