= Alberto Gómez =

Alberto Gómez may refer to:

- Alberto Gómez (Argentine footballer) (born 1950), Argentine midfielder
- Alberto Gómez (Cuban footballer) (born 1988), Cuban midfielder
- Alberto Gómez (Uruguayan footballer) (born 1944), Uruguayan forward
- Alberto Gómez (writer), creator of telenovelas such as Secreto de amor
- Alberto Gómez Gómez (born 1956), Colombian–American artist
- Nagore (footballer) (born 1980), birth name Alberto Gómez Fernández
