= List of Colombian musicians =

This is a list of Colombian musicians.

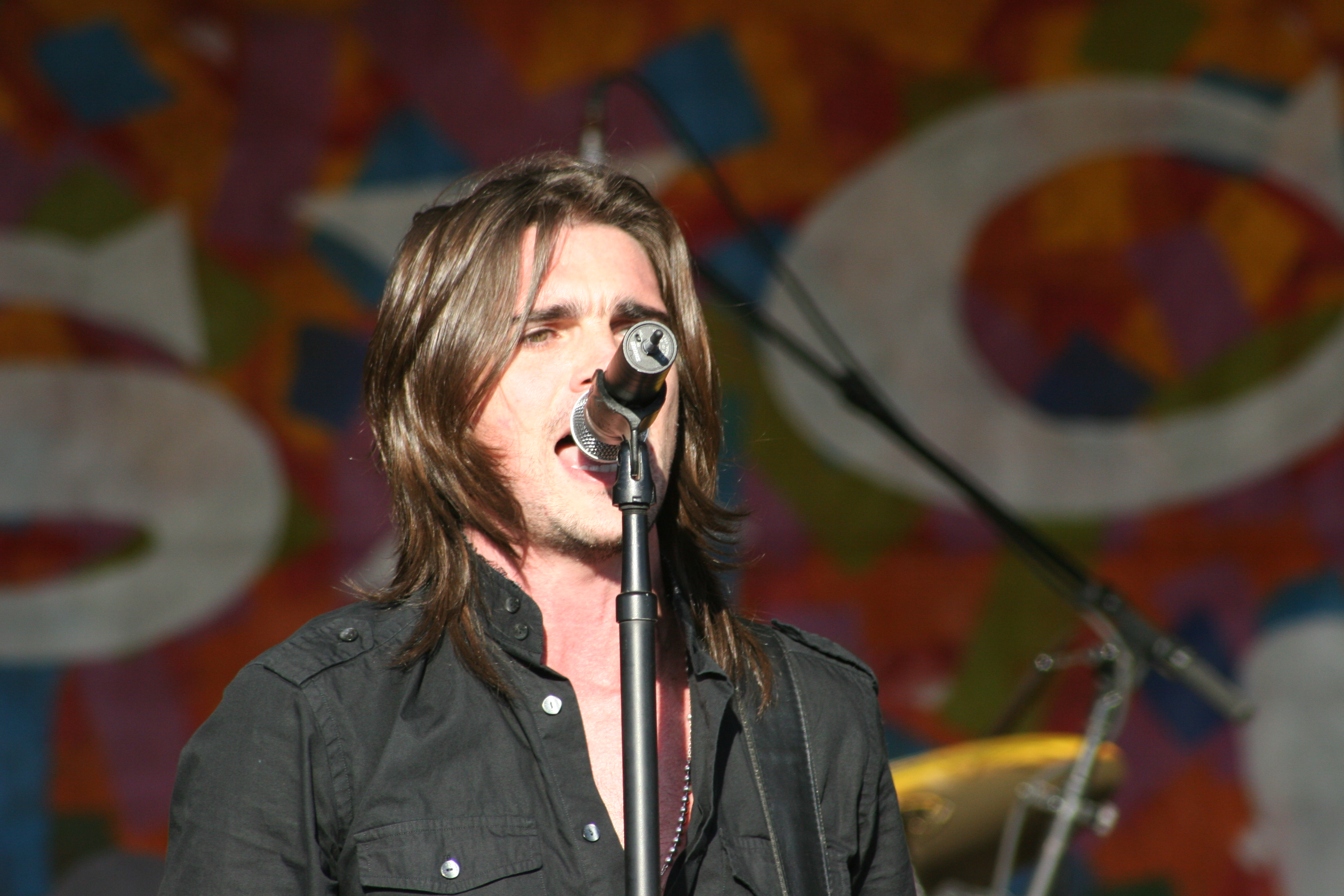
Juanes performing at the New Orleans Jazz & Heritage Festival in 2005

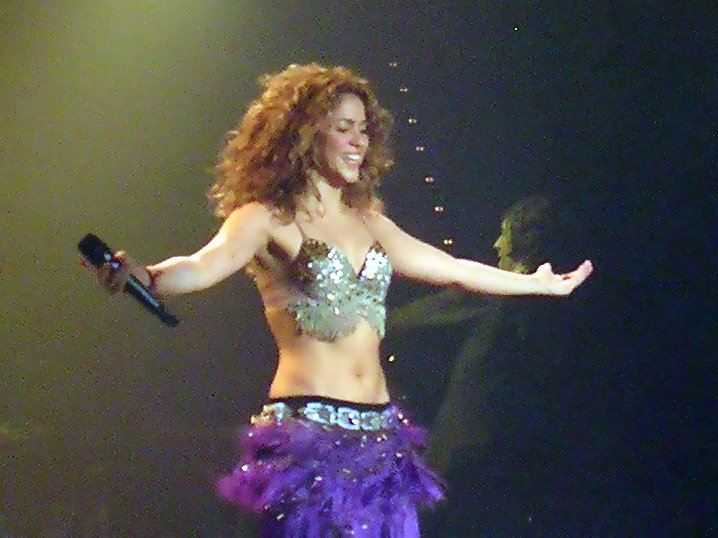
Shakira performing during the Oral Fixation Tour in 2006

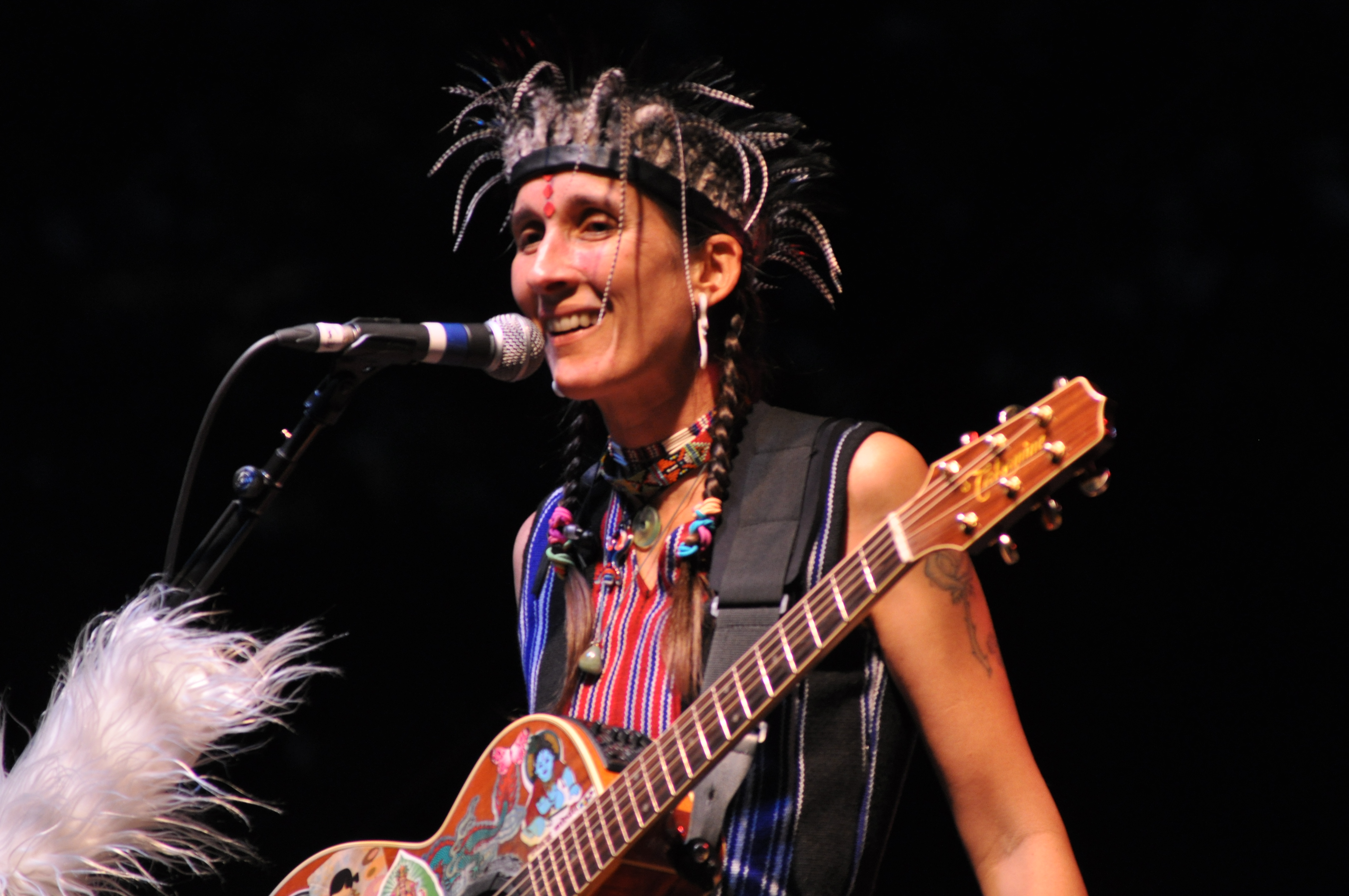
Andrea Echeverri performing at Bumbershoot in 2010

== Opera singers ==
- Juan Carlos Echeverry, tenor

== Producers ==
- Kike Santander, producer
- Sky Rompiendo, producer, songwriter, DJ

== Singers and musicians ==
- Carlos Vives, actor, composer and singer
- Joe Arroyo, musician and singer
- Las Áñez, music duo
- Mauricio Buraglia, composer, recording-artist and musician
- Andrés Cabas, pop singer
- Rafael Orozco, singer
- Ryan Cabrera, singer
- Andrea Echeverri, singer
- Raúl Castaño Escobar, musician and composer
- Fonseca, singer
- Esther Forero (1919–2011), singer and composer
- Juanes, singer
- Juan Garcia-Herreros electric bassist
- Ericson Alexander Molano, gospel singer
- Totó la Momposina, singer
- Lucía Pulido, singer
- Shakira, singer
- Soraya, singer
- Ryan Starr, singer
- Jorge Villamizar, singer
- Charlie Zaa, singer
- Fanny Lú, singer
- Estefano, singer
- Alex Campos, singer
- José Barros, singer
- Lucas Arnau, singer
- Veronica Orozco singer
- Andrés Cepeda, singer
- Sasha Keable, singer
- Dario Gomez, singer
- Rafael Escalona, singer, accordion player
- Rafael Godoy, composer
- Marbelle, singer
- Kaleth Morales, singer
- Jorge Celedon, singer
- Emiliano Zuleta, singer
- Silvestre Dangond singer
- Maía, singer
- Naty Botero, singer
- Diomedes Diaz, singer
- Kali Uchis, singer
- J Balvin, singer, composer
- Maluma, singer, composer
- Sebastian Yatra, singer, composer
- Karol G, singer, composer
- Camilo Echeverry, singer
- Feid, singer, songwriter
- Manuel Turizo, singer

== See also ==
- List of Colombian artists
- List of Colombian writers
