= Arbelaez (surname) =

Arbelaez, or Arbeláez is a surname, of Colombian origins. It may include:

- Carolina Arbeláez (born 1995) Colombian footballer
- Carlos Ignacio Urrea Arbeláez (born 1966) Colombian diplomat, 10th Ambassador of Colombia to China
- Joaquín Vallejo Arbeláez (1912–2005) Colombian civil engineer, businessman and writer
- Manuela Arbeláez (born 1988) Colombian-born American model and actress
- Natalia Arbelaez (born 1983) American-born Colombian sculptor, ceramicist, and teacher
- Natalia Castañeda Arbelaez (born 1982) Colombian painter
- Roberto Urdaneta Arbeláez (1890–1972) Colombian Conservative party politician
- Victor Arbelaez (1953–2007) Colombian professional soccer player and coach

== See also ==
- Arbeláez, a town and municipality in the Cundinamarca Department, Colombia
