= Bachué =

Mother goddess in the South American Muisca religion

- Mother goddess
- Member of Muisca religion
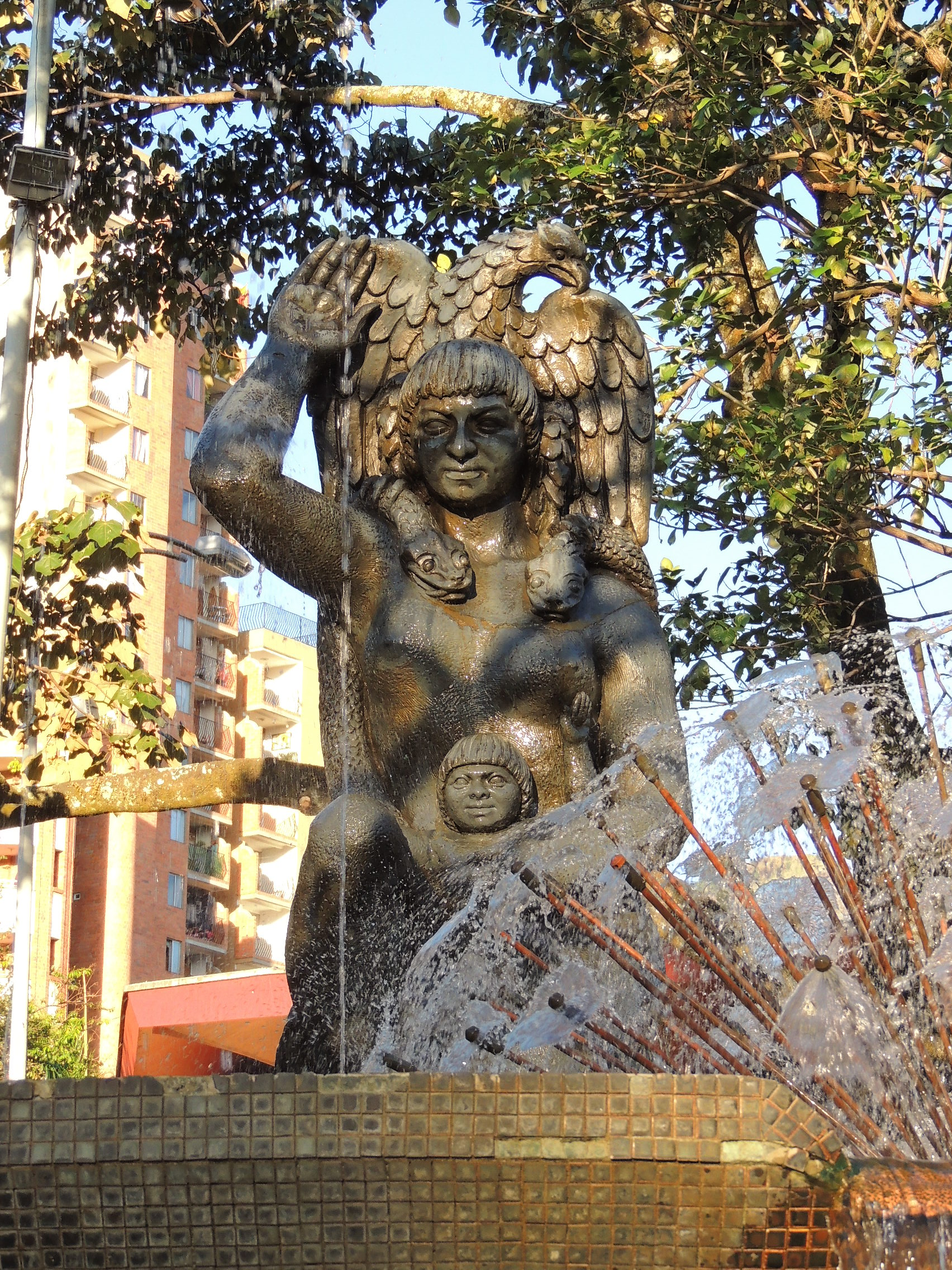
- Statue of Bachué in Medellín
- Other names: Furachogua
- Affiliation: Chiminigagua (supreme being)
- Region: Altiplano Cundiboyacense
- Ethnic group: Muisca

Equivalents
- Christian: Eve
- Etruscan: Uni
- Greek: Gaea
- Hindu: Durga
- Norse: Frigg
- Roman: Cybele
- Slavic: Mokosh

The goddess Bachué (in Chibcha language: "the one with the naked breast") is a mother goddess that, according to the Muisca religion, is the mother of humanity. She emerged from the waters in the Iguaque Lake with a baby in her arms, who grew to become her husband and populated the Earth. She received worship in a temple, in the area now within the municipality of Chíquiza, formerly called "San Pedro de Iguaque”.

The legend tells that after she accomplished the goal of giving birth to humanity, Bachué and her husband, the parrot god, became snakes and returned to the sacred lagoon. The history of Bachué was mentioned by the Spanish chronicler Pedro Simón in his book Noticias Historiales, where he wrote that the indigenous people also called her "Furachogua" (Chibcha for "the good woman"), and worshipped her as one of their main deities. Simón also mentions that the Muisca believed that Bachué sometimes came back from the underworld to guide her people.

== See also ==
- Muisca women
- Rómulo Rozo – sculptor of Bachué, goddess generatriz of the Chibchas
