= Germán Londoño =

Colombian artist (born 1961)

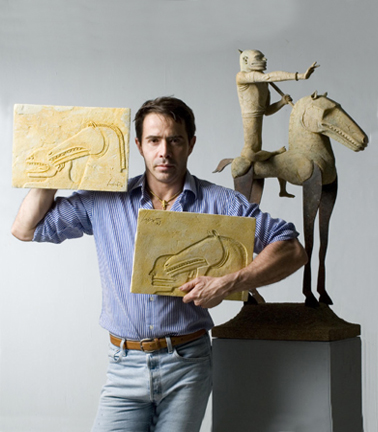
Germán Londoño in 2014. Pintor Escultor y dibujante (Sculptor, painter and draughtsman)

Germán Londoño (born October 12, 1961, in Medellín, Colombia), is a Colombian painter, draftsman and sculptor. He studied in the Libe de Zulátegui Arts Academy in Medellín, Colombia and as a Master in Lithography at the Scuola Internazionale d' Arte IL Bisonte, Florence, Italy.

Londoño's work has been exhibited in museums such as the Bogotá Museum of Modern Art, the Museum of Antioquia, the La Tertulia Museum and the Museum of Lisbon. He has also exhibited in art galleries in Colombia, Italy, Portugal, Spain and the United States.

== Reception ==
ArtNexus magazine says that Londoño uses "strategies such as humor and caricature" in his paintings to relay a narrative that "reveal the presence of a different sort of metaphysics: the farce of everyday life. In a short period of time, and from his first exhibition, Londoño has gone beyond all the premises of the transvanguardia, openly establishing his own style and shunning pre-determined formulas, to create his own universe."

Hank Burchard from the Washington Post says the subjects he paints appear to be "save-the-whales familiar" and are "colorful and compositionally cunning". Titles such as Tribute to Antarctica and Woman Writing in an Island may or may not be politically correct, but they certainly are colorful and compositionally cunning.

Ana María Coronel de Rodríguez says "the whimsically expressionistic character of his powerful figurative imagery has a fashionably postmodern air, seemingly a belated development from the Italian ultravanguard of the 1980s. His work's strength derives from a rigorously exercised, highly original capacity for structuring composition, a refined sense of color, and a controlled gestural brush-stroke."

== See also ==
- Art Galleries in Colombia
- Colombian art
- Culture of Colombia
- List of Colombian artists
