= Pedro Ruiz (artist) =

Colombian artist (born 1957)

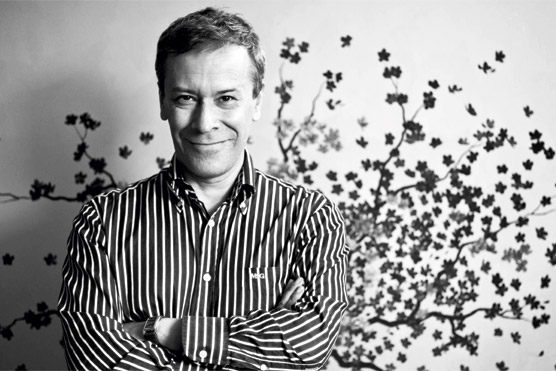
- Born: 1957 (age 68–69)
- Education: École nationale supérieure des Beaux-Arts
- Known for: Colombian Painting
- Awards: Knight; Ordre des Arts et des Lettres
- Website: http://www.pedroruiz.co

Pedro Ruiz (born 1957) is a Colombian Artist, whose focus on conceptual painting is marked by examining the socio-political context of his native Colombia.

== Career and education ==
He studied at the École nationale supérieure des Beaux-Arts in Paris, which he attended from 1979 to 1983. After completing his degree, he began exploring painting and printing techniques at Stanley William Hayter's studio, Atelier 17. After spending five years in Paris, he returned to his home in Bogotá. There he began work with the advertising agency McCann, where he became the company's Artistic Director.

== Major exhibitions and auctions ==
Pedro Ruiz began solo exhibitions as an artist in Bogotá in the late 1980s. He is currently represented by Beatriz Esguerra Art in Bogotá.

- (2012–2018) Latin American Art Sale, Christie's, New York, NY
- 2016 – GOLD Spirit and Nature of a Territory, Presented By the Embassy of Colombia and Maddox Gallery, Mayfair, London.
- 2015 – Anything Goes / "Todo Vale", Beatriz Esguerra Art, Bogota, Colombia
- 2009 – GOLD Spirit and Nature of a Territory, Museo de Arte Moderno de Bogota, Colombia
- 2007 – Love is in the Air, Museo de Arte Moderno de Bogotá, Colombia
- 1999 The Natural Library, Galería Casas-Reigner, Bogota

== Honors and awards ==
- 2014 – Named Friend of UNICEF Bogotá
- 2010 – Conferred as Knight of the Order of Arts and Letters (Chevalier dans l’Ordre des Arts et des Lettres) by the French government for his contribution to Colombian art
- 2003 – Winner of the Call for Exhibitions at the Santa Fe Gallery Room
