= Erika Diettes =

Colombian visual artist

Erika Diettes (born 1978) is a Colombian visual artist. Born in Cali, Colombia she currently lives and works in Bogota, Colombia. At the age of 15, Erika and her family moved to Washington DC where her father worked as a police attaché at the Colombian Embassy. Once settled into her new school, she began to study art, ceramics, theatre and photography. Her parents were supportive of Erika's artistic goals and her mother gifted Erika her first camera, which she used in creating her first book Silencios. She attended the Pontificia Universidad Javeriana Bogotá where she received a degree in social communications, the Universidad de los Andes Bogota where she received her MA in Anthropology.

Diettes is best known for her series of portraits titled Sudarios, this photography project is made up photographs of women who were forced to witness the torture of their loved ones during the Colombian conflict. Her work is included in the collections of the Museum of Fine Arts Houston, the Santa Barbara Museum of Art, Museums of Modern Art of Bogotá, Cali, Medellín and Barranquilla, the National Museum of Colombia, the Museum of Contemporary Arts in Santiago de Chile, Centro Cultural recoleta in Buenos Aires.

In 2017, Diettes was awarded the Tim Heatherington Fellowship.

== Written works ==
- Silencios (2005)
- Rio Abajo (2008)
- Noticia al aire...Memoria en vivo (2010)
- Sudarios (2012)

== See also ==
- List of Colombian women artists
