= Manuel Hernández Gómez =

Colombian painter (1928–2014)

- Born: October 20, 1928; Bogotá, Colombia
- Died: October 1, 2014; Bogotá, Colombia
- Other names: Manuel Hernández, Manuel Hernandez Gomez, Manuel Hernández Viveros
- Education: National University of Colombia, Academy of Painting
- Occupation(s): Painter, educator
- Known for: Painting
- Spouse: Pilar Quiñónez de Hernández

Manuel Hernández Gómez (1928—2014) was a Colombian painter and educator. He is considered one of the key figures in abstract painting in the country, and exhibited his work internationally. Hernández Gómez was a professor at the School of Fine Arts in Bogotá, and served as director of the School of Fine Arts in Ibagué.

== Biography ==
Hernández Gómez was born on October 20, 1928, in Bogotá, Colombia. He studied fine art at the National University of Colombia; and at the Academy of Painting in Santiago de Chile. He continued his studies at Accademia di Belle Arti di Roma, and the Art Students League of New York.

Hernández Gómez was part of the art groups Taller 9, and Nueva Generación. In the 1960s, he abandoned the figurative style of painting and dedicated himself to abstract art. In 1967, he received first prize at the XIII National Salon with his work 'flores en blanco y rojo'.

Hernández Gómez was married Pilar Quiñónez de Hernández. He died on October 1, 2014, in Bogotá.

His work is found in public collections and archives, including the Blanton Museum of Art, and the print collection of the New York Public Library. In 2020, his work was part of the group exhibition Expanding Abstraction: Pushing the Boundaries of Painting in the Americas, at the Blanton Museum of Art in Austin, Texas.

== See also ==
- List of Colombian artists
