= Julio Abril =

Colombian sculptor, painter, and draughtsman

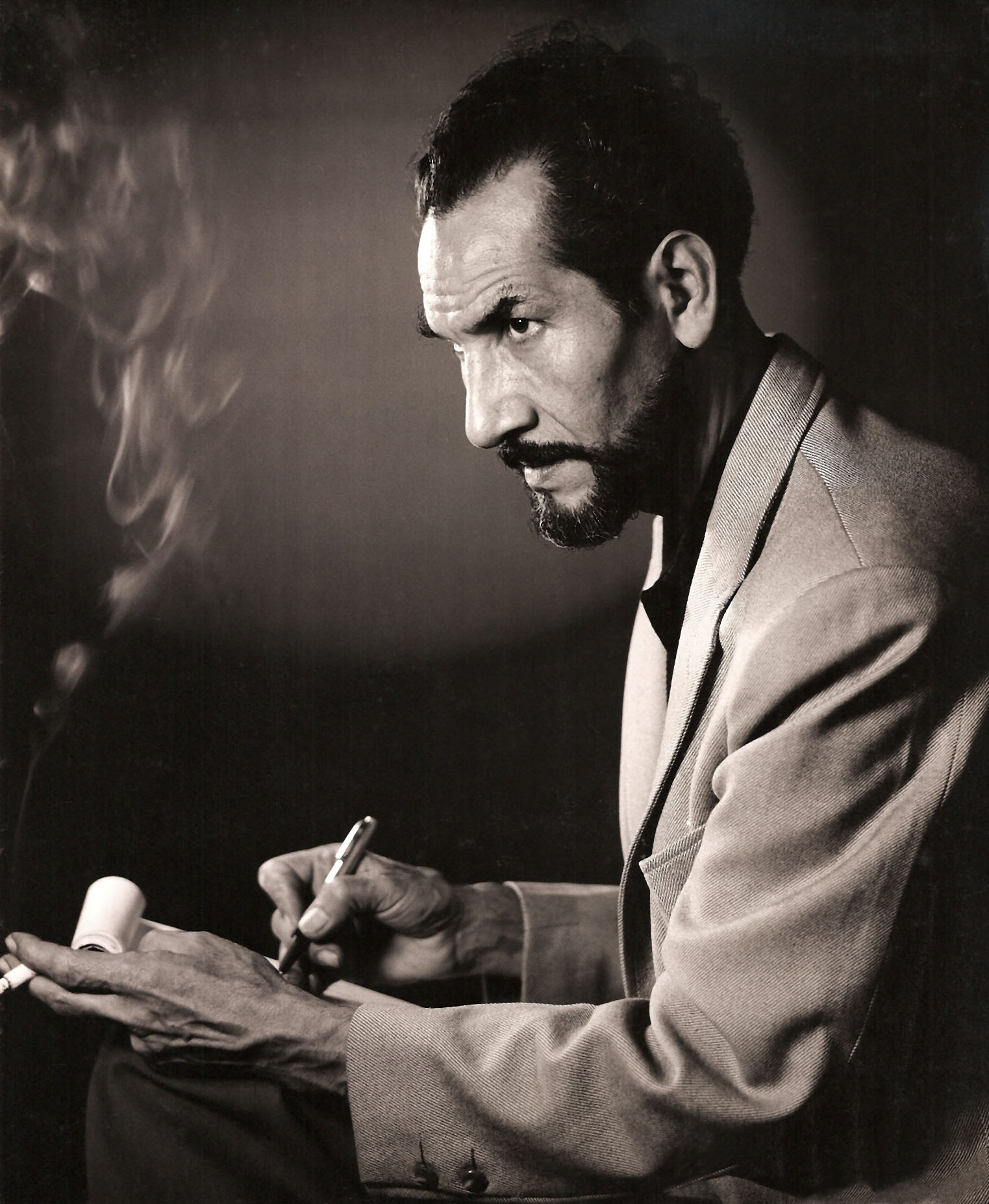
- Julio Abril in 1960
- Born: Julio Vicente Agapito Abril Mayorga; 20 August 1911; Moniquirá, Colombia
- Died: 24 April 1979 (aged 67); Villavicencio, Colombia
- Education: Escuela de Bellas Artes Universidad Nacional; Escuela Nacional de Artes Plásticas Academia de San Carlos; Escuela de Pintura, Escultura, y Grabado "La Esmeralda"
- Known for: Sculpture, painting, drawing
- Notable work: El Beso (Primavera), Amor Campesino, Inercia

Julio Vicente Agapito Abril Mayorga (20 August 1911 – 24 April 1979) was a Colombian sculptor, painter, and draughtsman.

== Biography ==
=== Beginnings in the arts ===
Julio Abril was born in Moniquirá on 20 August 1911. He studied in 1928 at the Salesian school Central Technical Institute of Bogotá and during 1929 was the student of Colombian cartoonist Lisandro Serrano's mother in Moniquirá. In 1933 he completed his studies at the school founded by the prominent educator Alfonso Ramirez who in timely fashion stimulated the budding artist in Abril. From 1934 to 1939, on scholarship from the Department of Boyacá he studied sculpture under the direction of artists Gustavo Arcila Uribe, José Domingo Rodríguez and Carlos Reyes at the School of Fine Arts of the National University in Bogotá, Colombia.

In 1936 he held his first exhibition where he presented his wood sculpture Cabeza de India (Head of an Indian Woman) (1936), which was comprehensively commented by Leon Angel for El Tiempo (Colombia) and for which he received first prize at the Exhibition of Barranquilla in 1938.

His appreciation and talent for drawing led him to produce, in collaboration with artists Luis Alberto Acuña and Gonzalo Ariza, the illustrations for the book La roma de los chibchas (The Rome of the Chibchas) by Gabriel Camargo Pérez in 1937, and starting in 1938 he began publishing his drawings in the Sunday pages of El Tiempo. He continued until his death to publish illustrations and drawings in the newspapers and magazines of Colombia.

In 1939 he won the national competition for the monument to the Chibcha race in Boyacá, Monumento al Indio (Monument to the Indian), with his project Monument to Quemuenchatocha (1939). The same year he organized and participated in the Exhibit of Artists of Boyacá on the IV Centennial of Tunja where he exhibited 4 sculptures: Cabeza de India Boyacense (Head of Boyacense Indian Woman) (1936), Maternidad (Maternity) (1939), Alfarera de Ráquira (Potter Woman of Ráquira) (1938), Project for the Monument to the Indian (1939), and 3 drawings: Bañista (Bather), Project for the Monument to the Races, Project for the Monument to the Quimbayas. Following these events, the interview "Julio Abril, the interpreter in stone of autochthonous motifs" in which Abril reveals his concepts on Colombian artists, is published in the newspaper La Razón, and in the magazine Estampa, an article is published about his intensely autochthonous works as strong representatives of a Colombianist art.

=== Years in Mexico and the United States ===
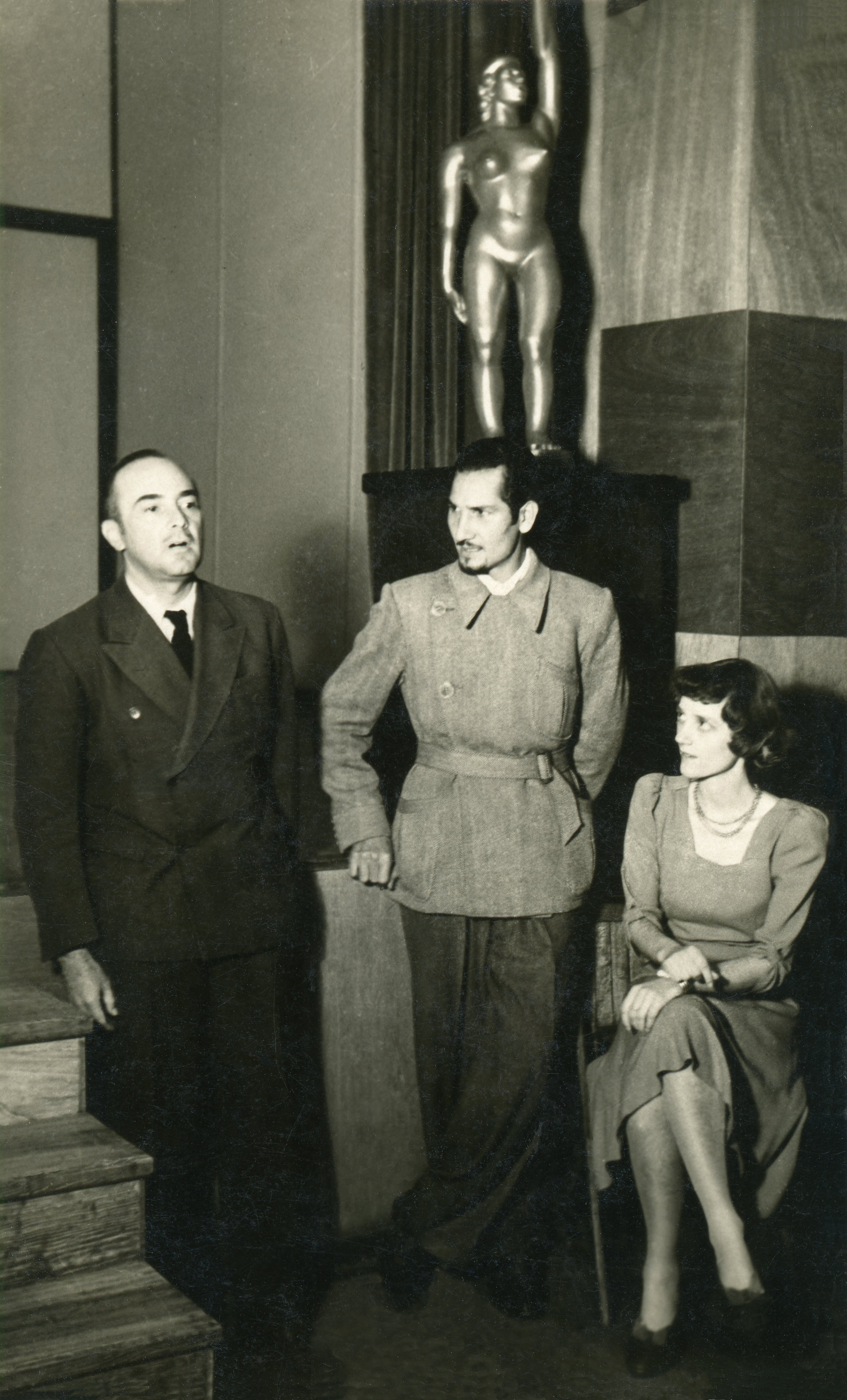
Inaugural Act Julio Abril & Viola Horpel de Abril, Mexico City, 1942

In 1939 the Department of Boyacá awarded Abril a scholarship to further his studies in sculpture at a school of fine arts in Italy or Mexico. For reasons of the generalized war in Europe he moved to Mexico City to continue his art studies at the Academy of San Carlos of the National Academy of Fine Arts and the School of Painting, Sculpture and Engraving "La Esmeralda", where he specialized in sculpture and casting under the direction of Guillermo Ruiz, Luis Ortiz Monasterio and Rómulo Rozo.

Despite his absence from Colombia, he participated in the II Salon of Colombian Artists and obtained an honorable mention for his Indio Sibundoy (Sibundoy Indian) (1941), one of his first works of his period in Mexico. In 1941 he participated with Luis Alberto Acuna, Rómulo Rozo, Leo Matiz, and Juan Sanz Santamaría in the Exhibition of Paintings, Sculptures and Prints of Colombian Artists living in Mexico, at the Palacio de Bellas Artes (Palace of Fine Arts) where among his sculptures and prints, he exhibited: Familia de Mineros (Family of Miners) (1940) and Karl Marx (1940). The Chilean poet Pablo Neruda spoke at the opening ceremony and Jose Reyes wrote about the Colombian artists in Mexico.

During his years in Mexico, Abril befriended Colombian writer Porfirio Barba-Jacob in the final years of the poet's life. Following Barba-Jacob's death on 14 January 1942, Abril produced the poet's funeral mask, which later passed into the possession of Colombian painter Dario Jimenez Villegas. Years later, Abril paid tribute to his friend Barba-Jacob with his sculpture Acuarimántima.

In Mexico, he married the American sculptor Viola Louise Horpel "Violeta", with whom he had three children: Andino Ilych, Obsidiana, and Jan Eddy. Abril and Viola Horpel held their first joint exhibition at the Art Gallery of Benjamin Franklin Library, where they exhibited 14 sculptures in bronze, stone, and wood. Most notable among them were the project for the "Monumento a los Comuneros" (1942) by Julio Abril and the project for the monument "Earth is for All" by Viola Horpel. The Mexican poet Carlos Pellicer delivered the opening speech at the inaugural event. Luis Alberto Acuña wrote about Abril's artistic work.

Abril published his text "Sobre el Arte de Colombia" in the Mexican magazine Noticia de Colombia. It would be the first of numerous articles on the plastic arts that he would publish in the Mexican and Colombian newspapers and magazines.

He died in Villavicencio on 24 April 1979.
