= Rómulo Rozo =

Colombian-born Mexican sculptor (1899–1964)

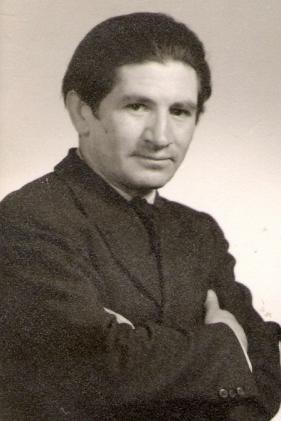
Rómulo Rozo

Rómulo Rozo Peña (1899 Bogotá – 1964 Mérida, Yucatán) was a Colombian-born Mexican sculptor.

Some sources state that he was born in Chiquinquirá, Boyacá. He lived a major part of his life in Mexico.

Rozo married Ana Krauss in Czechoslovakia and they had three children: Rómulo, Gloria and Leticia. His second wife was Manuela Vera (She was born in Yucatán) with whom he had two children: Marco Antonio and Gloria Antonia. Rozo is best known for his internationally recognized sculpture, Bachué, which influenced a generation of Colombian artists.

== Studies ==
Rozo completed his studies at the National School of Fine Arts, Central Technical Institute of Bogota. While he traveled through Europe between the 1924 and 1929, he studied at the Saint Fernando Academy of Fine Arts in Madrid, Spain. He then completed his studies in Paris, France, with Antoine Bourdelle, who exerted a major influence on his works. He participated in the Ibero-American Exposition of 1929 in Seville, Spain, where he won the Big Prize and the Medal of Gold, before returning to the Americas.

== Bachué and Seville ==
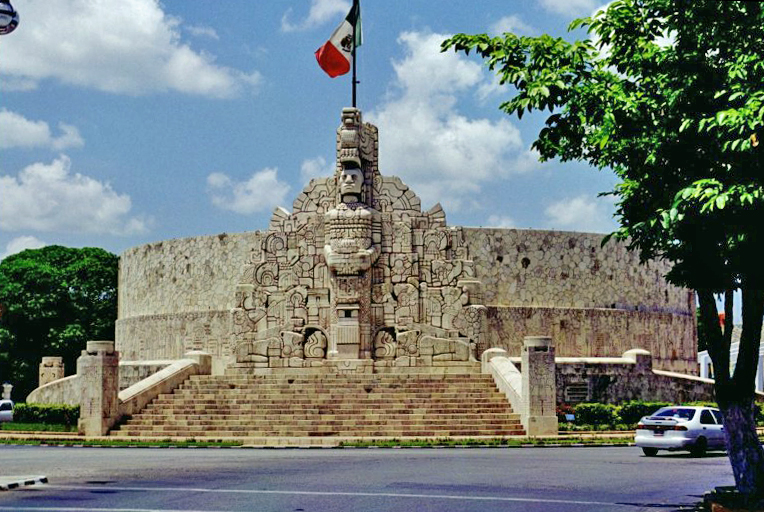
A statue in a traffic rotary on the Paseo De Montejo, Mérida, Yucatán

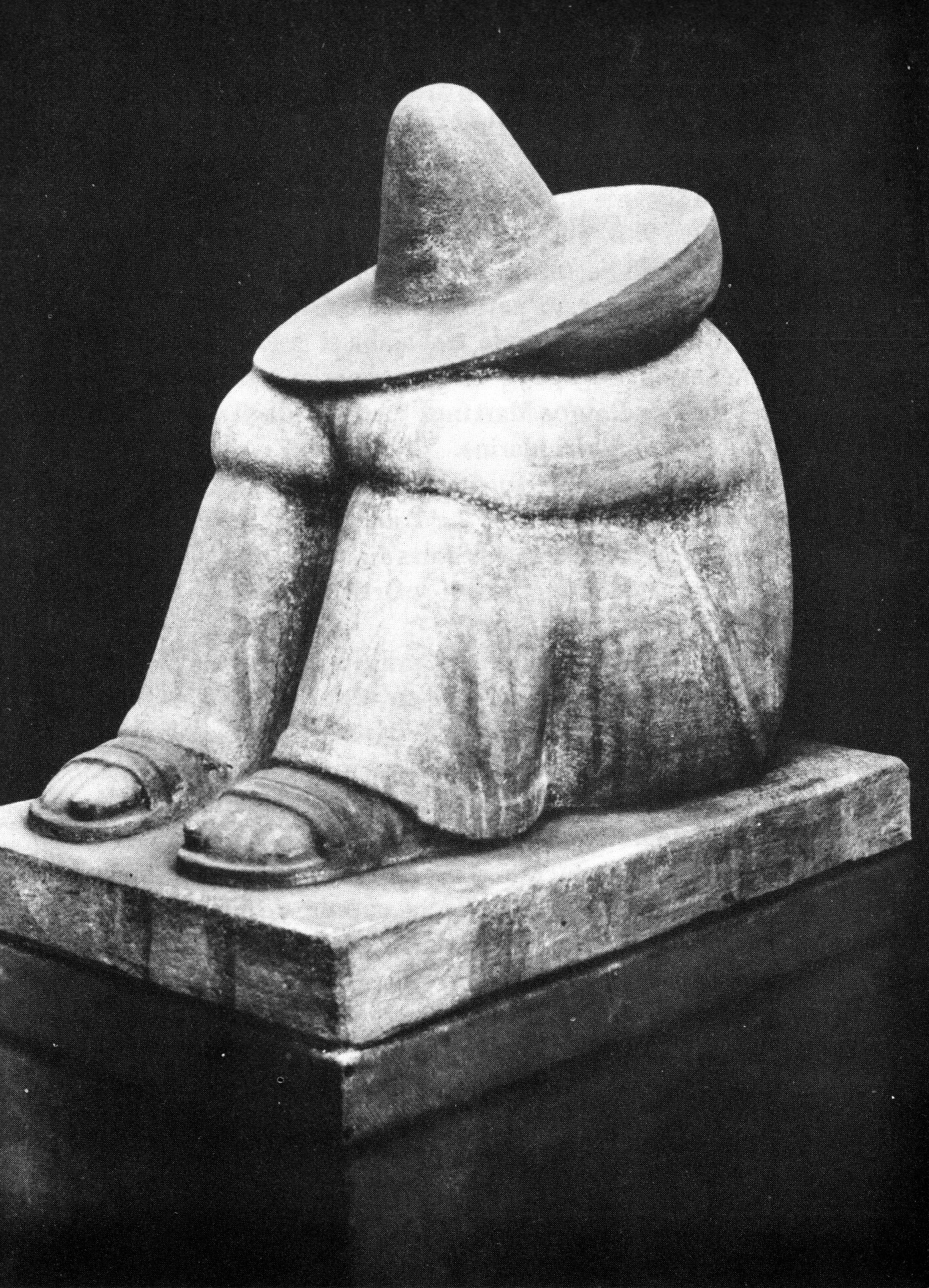
Sculpture of Rómulo Rozo Thought

In 1925, Rozo made one of his most renowned works, the Bachué goddess generatriz of the chibchas, a granite sculpture inspired by Colombian and pre-Columbian mythology. The work is a reference to the goddess Bachué, mother of the Muisca civilisation in their mythology. The response of the international press to Bachué and Rozo's other works raised the sculptor to greater recognition. He mixed his academic knowledge of Western art with elements of his own Latin American culture and native cultures of Asia and Africa, references he drew from the collections of the Louvre and museums of the Trocadéro in Paris. Admiration of Rozo's works was so great as to inspire a 1930 ephemeral literary movement in Colombia called "The Bachués", which advocated the review of the vernacular roots for the creation of a common people's art, in opposition to academic art.

The continuity of this influence among the sculptors of this generation (such as Luis Alberto Acuña, Ignacio Gómez Jaramillo, Pedro Nel Gómez, Ramón Barba, José Domingo Rodríguez, Hena Rodríguez, Miguel Sopó and Rodrigo Arenas Betancourt) signal the Bachué as the foundational sculpture of modern art in Colombia.

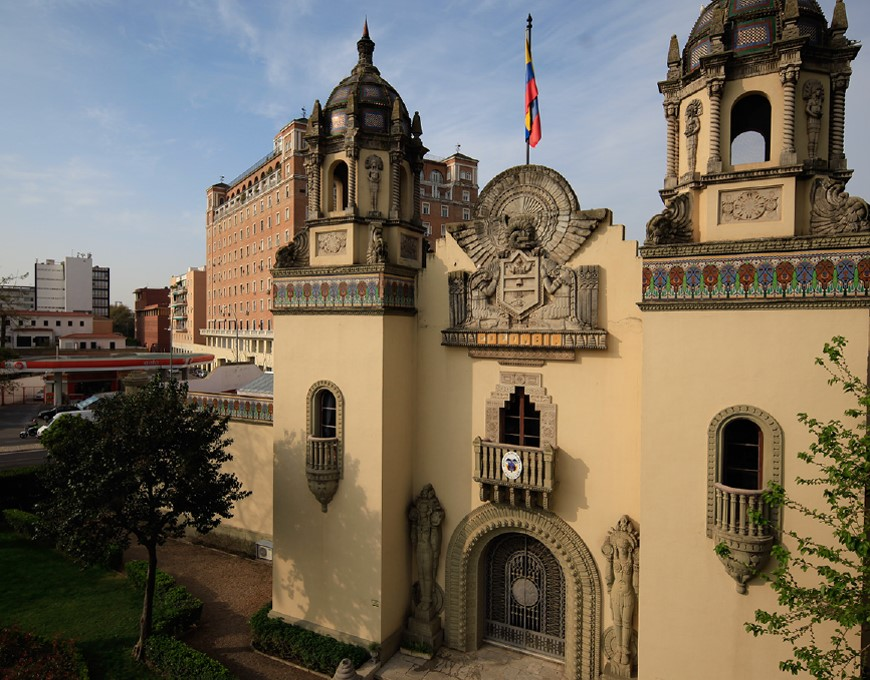
Colombian Pavilion at the Exhibition Iberoamerican of Sevilla. 1928–1929. Ornamentation of Rómulo Rozo.

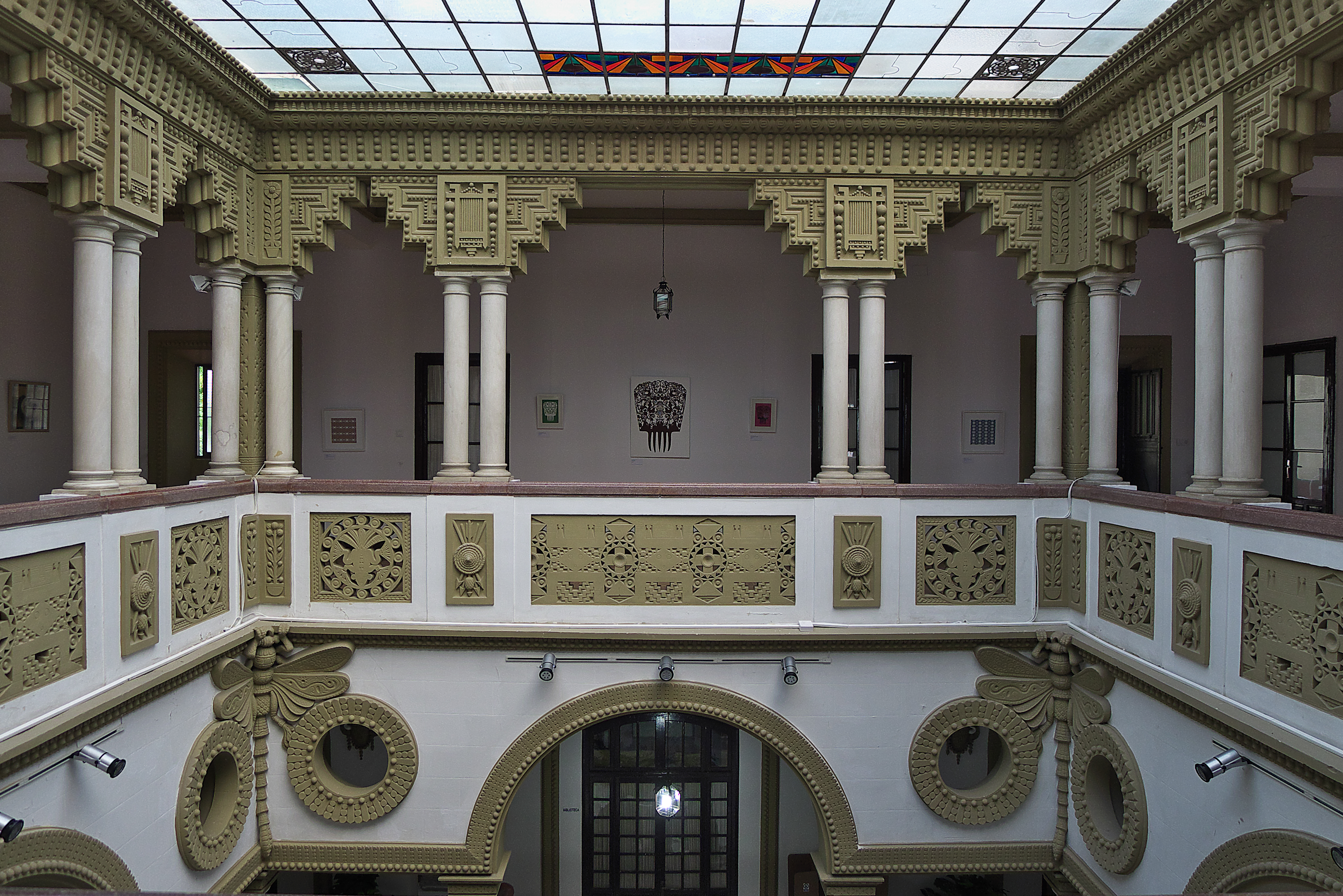
Colombian Pavilion at the Exhibition Iberoamerican of Sevilla. Romulo Rozo developed the Sculptural pavilion (1929).

For the Ibero-American Exposition of 1929 in Seville, the Colombian government hired Rozo to make the ornamentation for the Colombian Pavilion. Rozo reformed Spanish architect José Granados's original idea, which did allusion to a baroque church, turning it instead into a temple with an ornamental reference to the Chibchas gods of the Colombian prehispanic territory. Rozo convinced the collector of the Bachué to loan the work, so it could be placed in the middle of the pavilion during the year that the event lasted. Around it, Rozo created figures in plaster and concrete, with clear referents to the cultures of Tolima, Saint Agustín, Muiscas and the Mayas. The finished result of the installation was an odd beauty between the conjunction of religious architecture with a decoration based in pre-Columbian civilisations. Again, the international press concluded it to be an unprecedented success for the sculptor. Rozo decided not to return to Colombia, moving permanently to Mexico in 1931.

In spite of the great influence of the Bachué in the nationalist generation of artists in Colombia, the work disappeared after its exhibition in Seville. Only in 1998 (68 years after) was it found by art historian Álvaro Medina, and returned to Colombia for the exhibition "Colombia in the threshold of the modernity", curated by the same researcher.

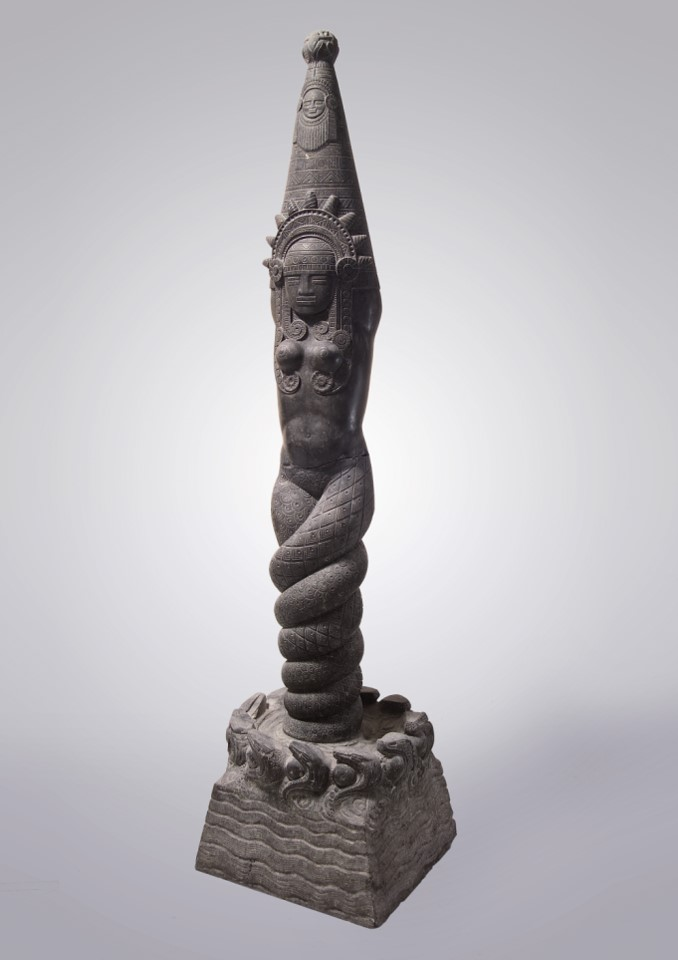
Bachué, goddess generatriz of the chibchas 1925, granite carving.

During the time the work was missing, a new wave of young artists and the media power of the Argentinian art critic Marta Traba overshadowed the contributions of this generation, condemning it to a second place in the history of Colombian art that was only reassessed since its reappearance. In spite of its historical value, no cultural institution in Colombia showed interest in purchasing it. However, the work became part of the collection of the Foundation Project Bachué, a platform interested in the conservation and gathering of Colombian art.

== See also ==
- List of Colombian artists
- List of Mexican artists
- List of sculptors
