= Danilo Dueñas =

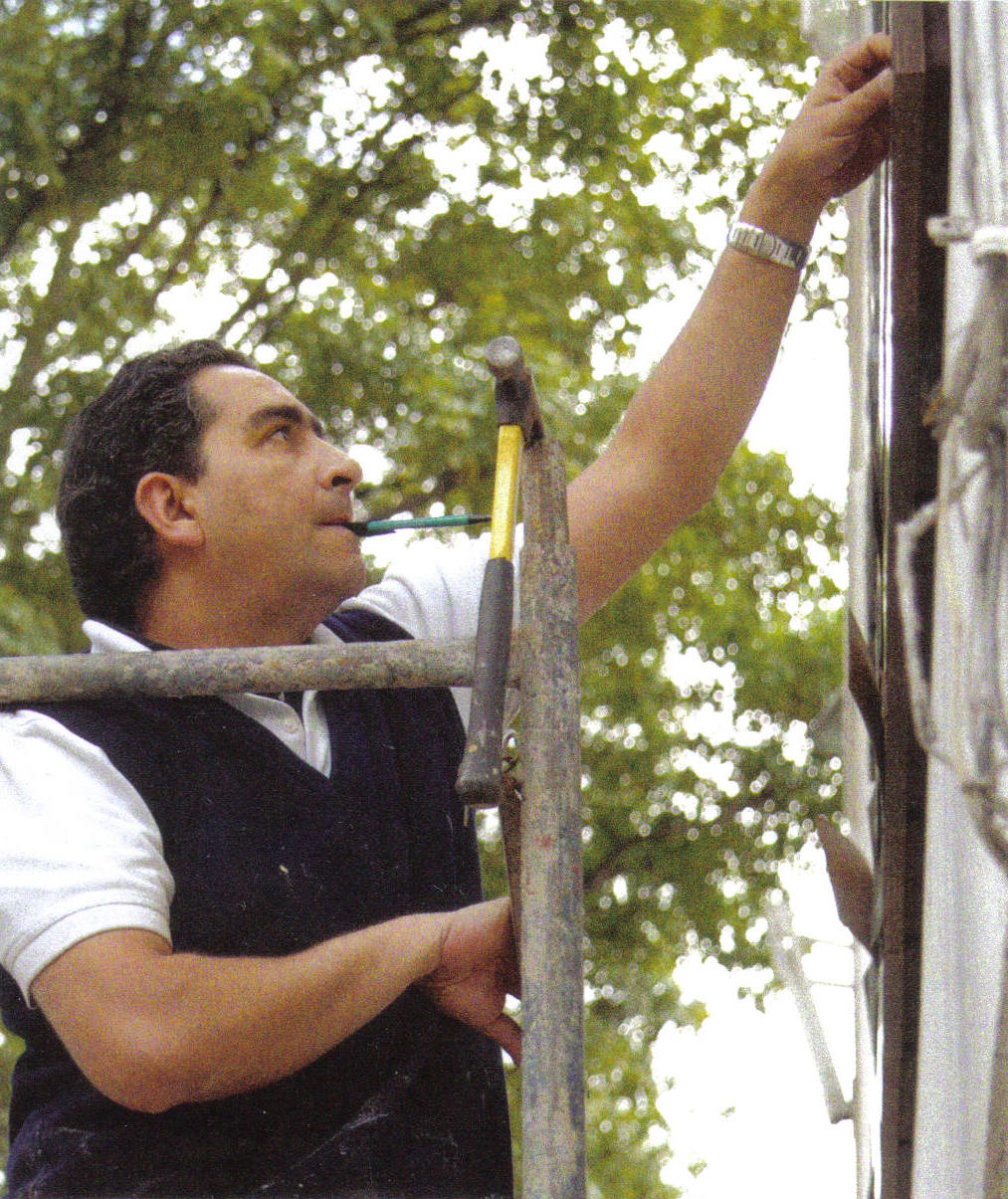
- Born: 15 August 1956 (age 69)
- Known for: Painting, Installation art
- Awards: DAAD Berliner Künstlerprogramm 2011, Premio Luis Caballero Finalist 2003, Johnie Walker in the Arts Prize Winner 1999, First Prize VI Regional Artists Salon of Bogotá 1993, National Grant of Artistic Creation by the Colombian Ministry of Culture 1993.

Danilo Dueñas (born 1956 in Cali, Colombia), has been a professor at the Art Department of the University of The Andes, the School of Fine Arts of the National University of Colombia and at the Faculty of Fine Arts of the Jorge Tadeo Lozano University since 1990. In 1995, he participated in the exhibitions Mesótica and Transatlántica, curated by Carlos Basualdo at the Museum of Contemporary Art and Design in San José de Costa Rica and the Alejandro Otero Museum of Visual Arts in Caracas, respectively. In 1999, he was the recipient of the Johnnie Walker in the Arts Award granted by Paulo Herkenhoff, for his installation "Espacio Preservado II", presented at the Luis Ángel Arango Library. In 2001, two simultaneous retrospective exhibitions of his works were held at the Museum of Modern Art in Bogotá and the Museum of Art of the National University of Colombia. In 2003, another retrospective exhibition was held at the Museum of Contemporary Art of Caracas. In 2006, he was the international guest at the Caracas FIA and in 2008 he presented "Dentro del espacio expositivo" at Periférico Caracas, curated by Jesus Fuenmayor. His works are also represented in the Museum of Fine Arts in Caracas and the Museum of Modern Art in Rio de Janeiro. He is now part of the Artist Pension Trust Mexico. During the year 2011, Danilo Dueñas was a guest of the Artists-in-Berlin Programme of the DAAD.

== Solo exhibitions ==
- "The Golgotha Series" (1987), The Guggenheim Gallery, Miami
- "Enchape" (1993), Museo de Arte de la Universidad Nacional, Bogotá
- "Trailer Exhibition" (1996), 36 Salón Nacional de Artistas, Corferias, Bogotá
- "Sin las palabras circundantes" (Historical revision) (2001), Museo de Arte Moderno de Bogotá, Bogotá
- "Sin las palabras circundantes" (Installations) (2001), Museo de Arte de la Universidad Nacional, Bogotá
- "Local (tllaqpc)" (2003), Premio Luis Caballero, Bogotá
- "Local (BOG-CCS)" (2003), Museo de Arte Contemporáneo de Caracas, Caracas
- "Ilegibilidad" (2005), Alianza Colombo-Francesa, Bogotá
- "Dentro del espacio expositivo" (2008), Periférico Caracas, Caracas
- "El Salón de Actos" (2008/09), 41 Salón Nacional de Artistas, Cali
- "A Flight" (2009) Galería Casas Riegner, Bogotá
- "At Actium and a tribute to John McCracken" (2011), daadgalerie Berlin
- "A door repeated and the wardrobe fell." (2012), Galerie Thomas Schulte Berlin
- "Sense of Mendicity" (2013), Alejandra von Hartz, Miami
- "Como es" (2014), Galería Casas Riegner, Bogotá
- "Arrecife" (2014), Galería Jenny Vilá, Cali
- "The painting fallen, and the collapse of Rome" (2015), Galerie Thomas Schulte, Berlin

== Group exhibitions ==
- "Mesótica- the america non-representativa" (1995), Museo de Arte y Diseño Contemporáneo, San José de Costa Rica
- "Transatlántica- the america-europa non-representativa" (1995), Museo de Artes Visuales Alejandro Otero, Caracas
- "Correspondences, Contemporary Art from the Colección Patricia Phelps de Cisneros" (2008), Wheaton College, Massachusetts
- "Geografías (in)visibles", (2008) Arte contemporáneo latinoamericano en la Colección Patricia Phelps de Cisneros", Centro León, República Dominicana
- "Beuys y más allá" (2011), Biblioteca Luis Angel Arango, Bogotá
- "Agency of Unrealized Projects" (2012), daadgalerie, Berlin
- "Teach Us To Outgrow Our Madness" (2014), Galerie Thomas Schulte, Berlin
- "Impulse, Reason, Sense, Conflict" (2014), CIFO Art Space, Miami
- "Abstracción" (2015), Galería Casas Riegner, Bogotá

== Public collections ==
- 1989 La Tertulia Museum, Cali
- 1989 Museo de Arte Moderno de Rio de Janeiro
- 1990 Museo de Arte Moderno de Bogotá
- 1992 Museo de Arte de la Universidad Nacional, Bogota
- 1993 Museo de Arte Moderno de Popayán
- 1994 Museo de Bellas Artes de Caracas
- 1998 Museo de Arte Moderno de Barranquilla
- 2003 Museo de Arte Contemporáneo de Caracas
- 2011 Biblioteca Luis Angel Arango, Bogotá

== Gallery ==
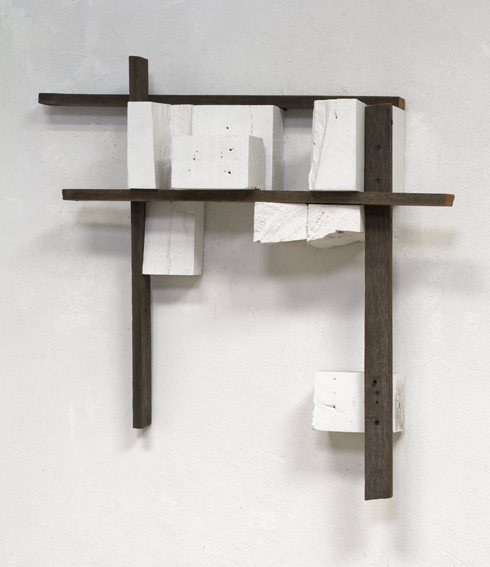
Topológico (2008)

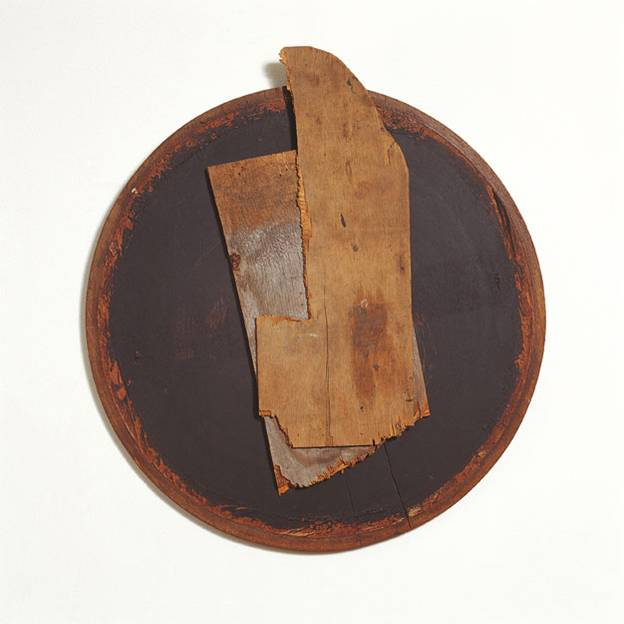
Fuera del Círculo (1988)

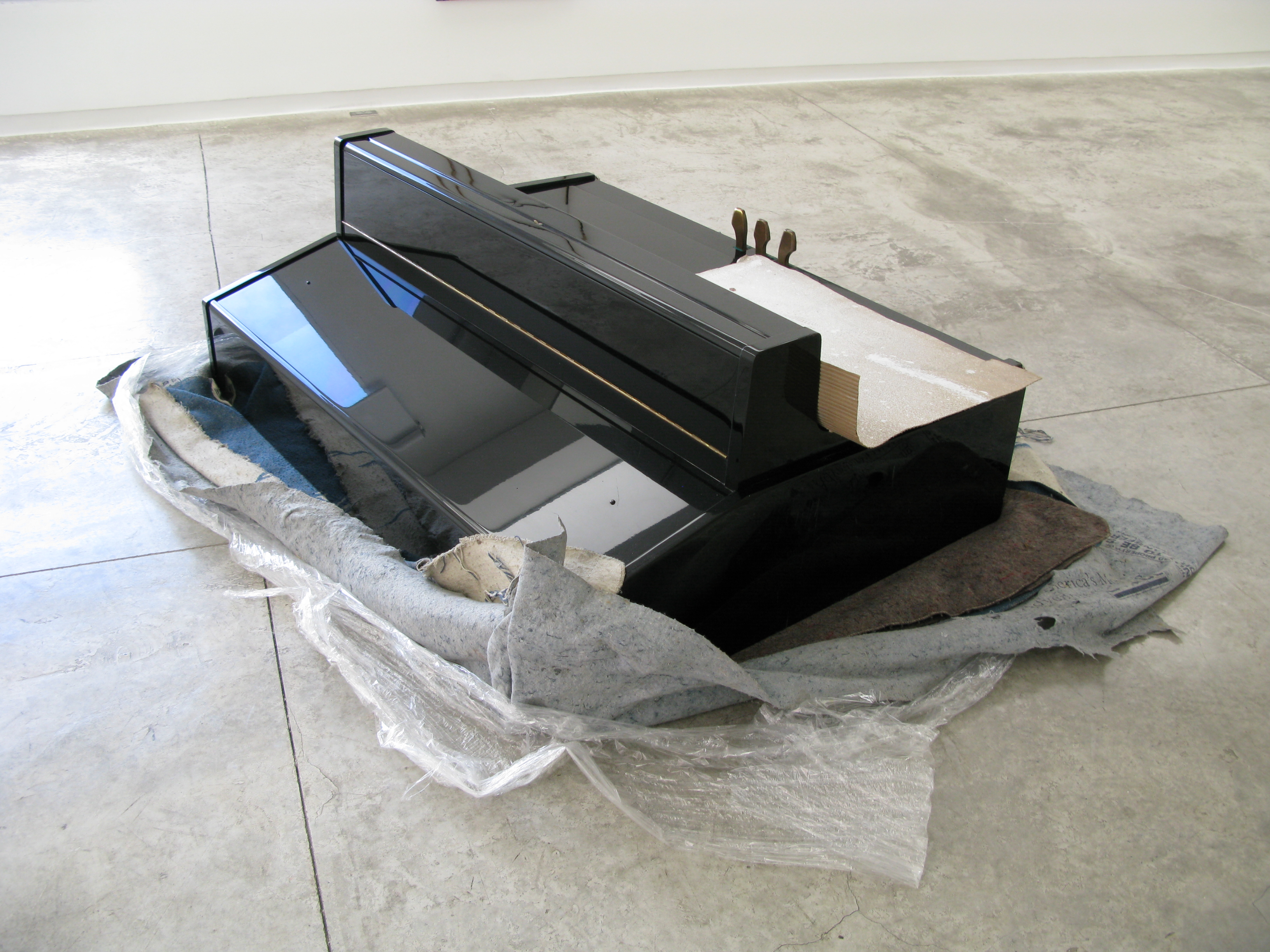
Piano Herido (2009)

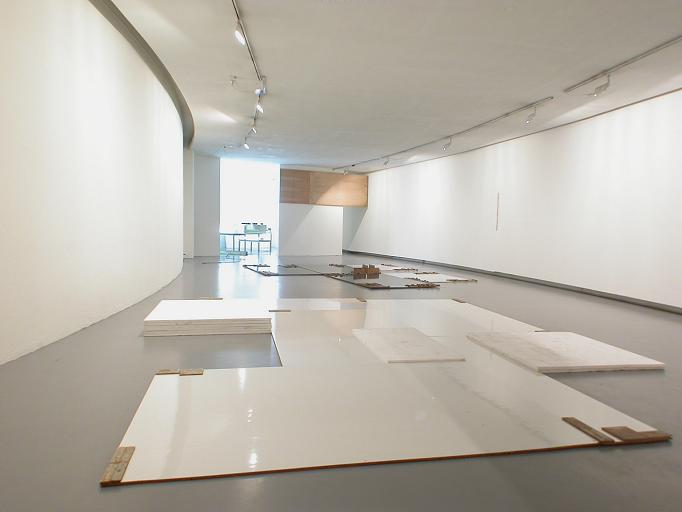
Local (tllaqpc) (2003)

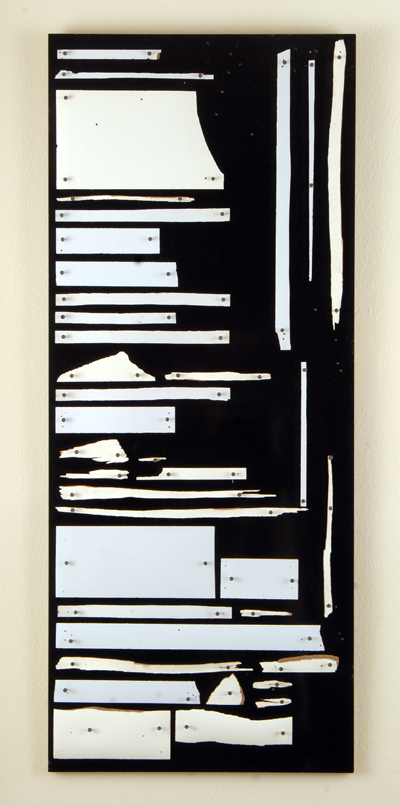
Taxonomía (2000)

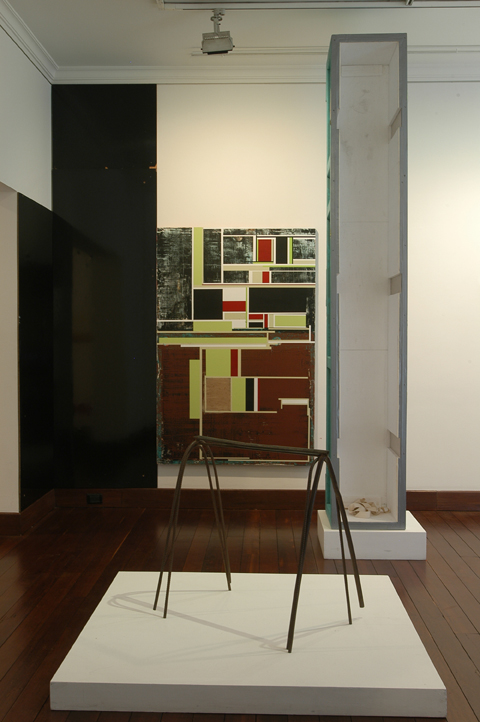
Circunstancia (2005)

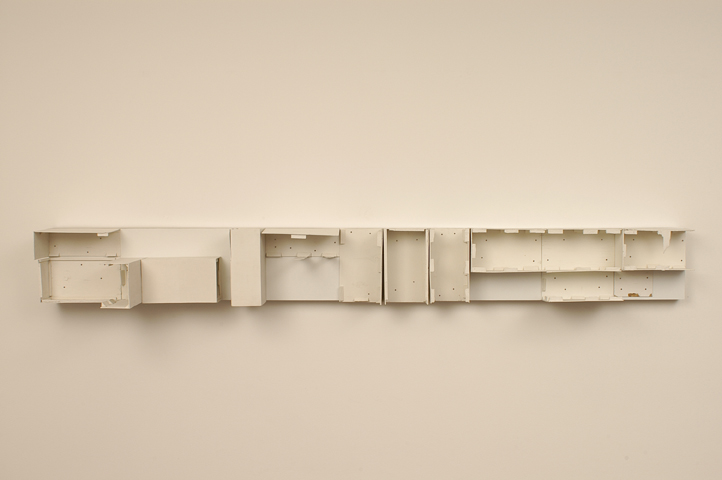
White Out (2001)

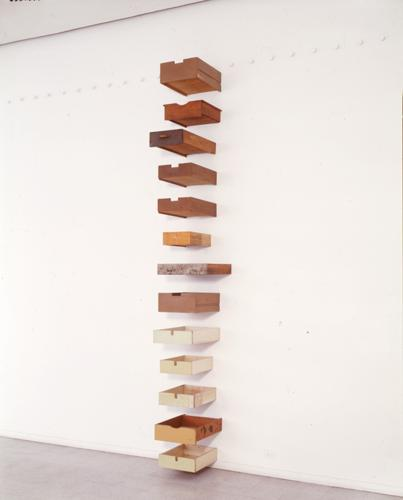
Cajones (2001)
