= Federico Uribe =

Columbian artist

- Born: 1962 (age 63–64); Bogotá, Colombia
- Known for: Painting

Federico Uribe (born 1962) is a Colombian artist living in Miami, Florida.

== Biography ==
Uribe grew up in Bogotá, Colombia, and attended the University of the Andes. Uribe pursued his bachelor's at the University of the Andes. In 1988, he left Colombia and moved to New York, where he would study a master in fine arts degree. During this time, he continued to study painting in New York under the guidance of Luis Camnitzer, who taught him essential skills that Uribe would later own use for his personal artworks. During his study, Uribe also lived in Cuba, Mexico, Russia, England, and the United States. He has lived in Miami since 2000.

== Work ==
Uribe describes his early work as "painful paintings relating to religion." In 1996 he stop pursuing oil painting and "started playing with objects." He realized that his calling was not to draw or paint on canvas, but rather to mold objects into vibrant images.

The connection that Federico has with words has led his art to follow that certain word that comes up to his mind, and the process of creating art and the outcome would be defined by it. And sometimes the association among the used objects and the meaning of the sculpture will end transmitting ironic, benevolent provocation.

His most recent work includes a series of animal sculptures created with bullets. The creatures are given certain features that of an animal that is on grief, threaten or escaping. This can be representations of the world and the current situations that we’re living in, where bullets are cheaper than buying a canvas and paint, where animals are massively being killed for fur, or food and the 90 percent of the killed animal's body mass is thrown away. Also, every animal can portray a different person in the society, such as the companies CEO's, who are represented by the lion that is at the top of the food chain and the running bunny, who represent the people escaping from debt and duties.

=== Style and technique ===
Uribe finds opportunity and plasticity in bits and pieces that society associates with one particular task and repurposes them into beautiful works of art. He creates images that are assemblages of items such as colored shoelaces and pins, cut up pieces of color pencils, or electrical wires and components. His work is "constructed and woven in ways, curious and unpredictable, intricate and compulsive. Handcraft is essential to Uribe, who embraces a tradition of exquisitely made objects. 'I like the idea,' he says, 'of leaving my materials visible as a testimony of my process and how much work I put into it.'"

Uribe transmits his feelings inspired by books that he listens to or classical paintings that he recalls. Many of his pieces draw from Old Master paintings, such as Leonardo, Velazquez, and others; however, the artist chose not to make these references the focus of his message. The potential narratives or supposed meaning seen in his work are not meant to promote any particular ideology; rather, the artist wants the imagery of his experience to resonate with his viewers.

According to Uribe, "If you relate to the objects, good. If it makes you smile, better. If it makes you think, I'm sure you're not thinking what I thought." Thus, the "plastic language" of his media, which transmits his emotional response to the world, hopes to relay a feeling – rather than a specific thought- to the viewer.

== Selected solo exhibitions ==
- 2023 Madison Museum of Contemporary Art: Madison, Wisconsin. Metamorphosis
- 2014 Adelson Galleries: New York, New York. Drawn in Pencils
- 2014 Adelson Galleries Boston: Boston, Massachusetts. Objects in a Mirror.
- 2013 Hudson River Museum: Yonkers, New York. Fantasy River.
- 2011 Boca Raton Museum of Art: Boca Raton, Florida. The World According to Federico Uribe.
- 2009 Chelsea Art Museum: New York, New York.
- 2007 Chelsea Art Museum: New York, New York.
- 2004 Art Museum of the Americas / O.A.S.: Washington, D.C.
- 2003 Bass Museum of Art: Miami, Florida.
