= Alonso Neira Martinez =

Colombian sculptor

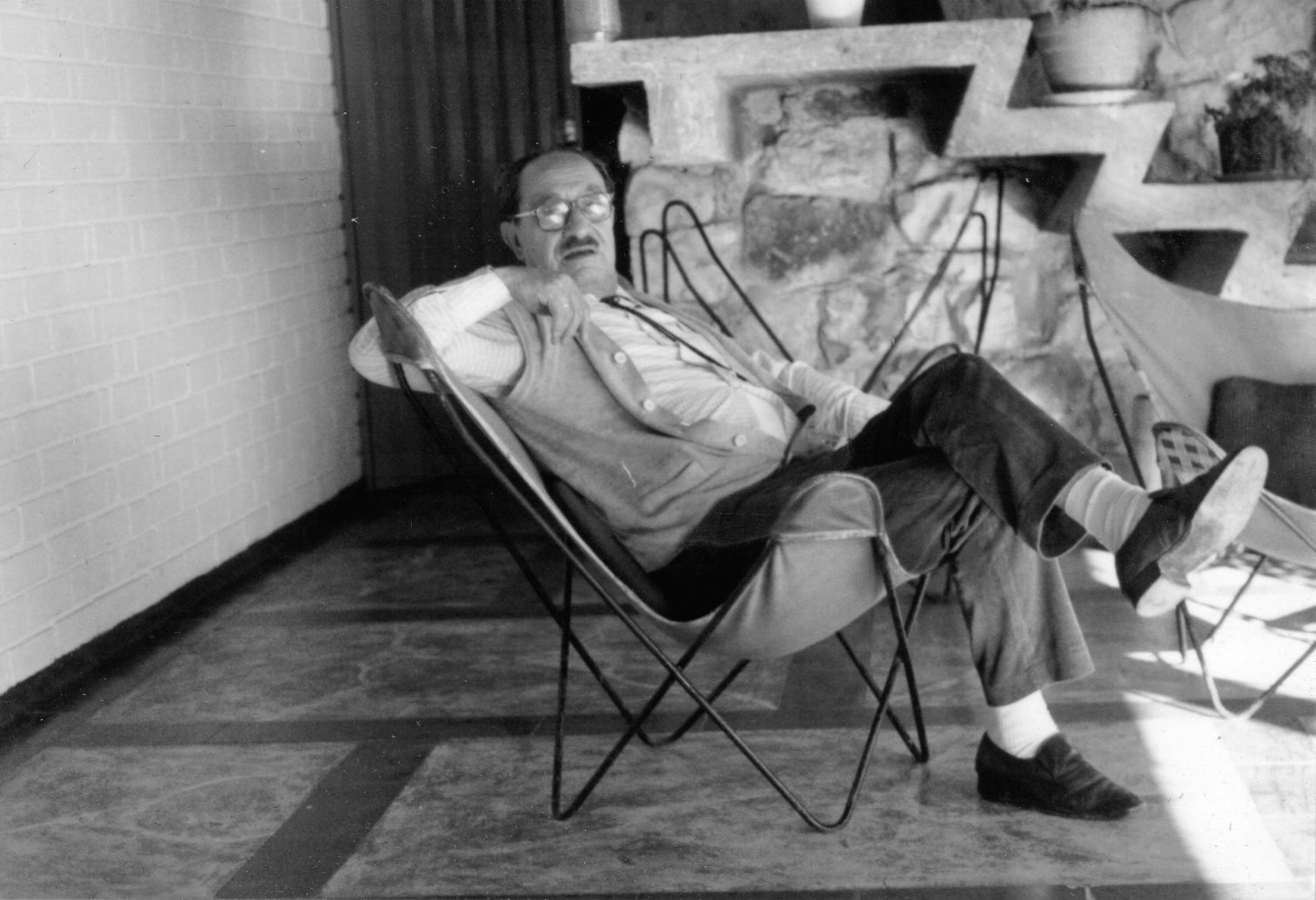
- Neira at his country house at El Ocaso, Cundinamarca, Colombia
- Born: December 27, 1913; Bogotá, D.C., Colombia
- Died: January 31, 1990 (aged 76); Bogotá, D.C., Colombia
- Education: School of Fine Arts, National University of Colombia
- Known for: Sculpture, Ceramics
- Notable work: Monument to the Chía goddess (1935)

Alonso Neira Martinez (December 27, 1913 – January 31, 1990) was a Colombian sculptor.

== Biography ==
Born in Bogotá, Colombia. His first encounter with sculpture was through ceramic. He helped in his father's (don Segundo Neira) pottery shop named "Etruria" which was open between 1890 and 1952.

1933. Went into the School of Beaux Arts in Bogota where he studied painting and sculpture with: Domingo Rodriguez, Gustavo Arcila Uribe, Domingo Moreno Otero, Carlos Reyes, Ramon Barba and Eugenio Zerda.
1935. Makes monument to the Chía (Moon) Goddess in Chía (Cundinamarca) along with Martin A. Jimenez and Luis Alfonso Sanchez V.

Chia Goddess Preliminary Sketch

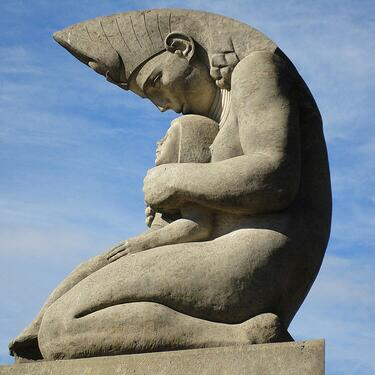
Chia Goddess Actual Sculpture

1936. Finalizes Art Studies.
1938 - 1957. Professor at the School of Beaux Arts at the National University of Colombia.
1940. Participant in the I Salon of Colombian Artists with the work: "Head of a Man", direct woodwork; and "Head of a Woman", ceramic.
1942. Participant of the III Salon of Colombian Artists first prize in sculpture with: Life (terracota) y Rest (terracota).
1944. Participant of the V Salon of Colombian Artists "Nude" gets a gold medal.
1948. Designs the monument to the Panamerican Flags in the place where the old Techo airport was at Bogotá.
1951. Participates in the international contest for posters to go along with the third Bolivarian Games in Caracas, Venezuela. His posters are honored with the first prize and are therefore used as the official game icons.
1952. August 7. Takes part again of the IX Salon of Colombian Artists with the clay sculpture "The Fountain".
1953. July 20. Takes part in the collective exposition in commemoration of the shout of Independence with the sculptures: "The Fountain" and "Nude".
1953 - 1964. Professor of painting and project management at the Faculty of Architecture of the National University.
1955. President of the School of Beaux Arts of the National University of Colombia.
1988. Scultps Bolívar in horse for the central plaza of Santa Rosa de Cabal, Risaralda, Colombia

== Style ==
His sculpture was mainly that of a so-called "academic style" with a strong influence of the typical facial and anatomical features of Mestizo Colombians with a larger component of Muisca features. This style is easy to recognize in his Mestizo muses in the Monument to Pan-American flags. During his early artistic career his role as professor of industrial and decorative painting for the Ministry of Education was quite important and influential. He later taught natural painting, modeling workshops, handicrafts, and comparative anatomy for the School of Beaux Arts at the National University of Colombia, and painting and project presentation for the Faculty of Architecture.

== Sculptures ==
"Rest" and "Life".
Monument to Students (Gimnasio Moderno, Bogotá).
Monument to Chía goddess (Chía, Cundinamarca).
24 bronze reliefs with decorative motifs to the Flags. (The monument to pan-american flags) (Techo, Bogotá).
Portrait of Julio Garavito Armero the wise (Sociedad Colombiana de Ingenieros).
Portrait of Jorge Eliecer Gaitan at calle 26 with carrera 17 in Bogota.

== Bibliography ==
- Alirio Gómez Picón: "¿Hay Escultores en Colombia?" "El Tiempo", Bogotá, October 8 of 1961.
- Biblioteca Luis Angel Arango Info. (in Spanish)
