= Sergio Trujillo Magnenat =

Colombian painter

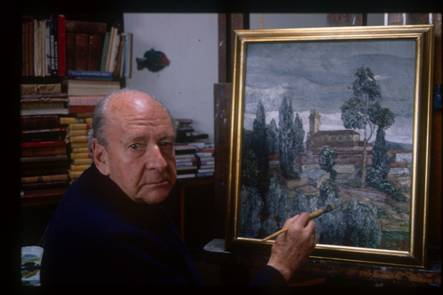
- Sergio Trujillo Magnenat in his Study in 1990
- Born: February 21, 1911; Manzanares, Colombia
- Died: December 8, 1999 (aged 88); Bogotá, Colombia
- Known for: Painter, sculptor
- Movement: Art Deco
- Spouse: Sara Dávila Ortiz

Sergio Trujillo Magnenat (February 21, 1911 – December 8, 1999) was a Colombian painter, illustrator and sculptor of Colombian father and Swiss mother.

== Biography ==
He took drawing classes at the night at the School of Fine Arts, where admitted after as a regular student. His teachers were the artists Roberto Pizano, Domingo Moreno Otero, Pedro A. Quijano, Francisco Antonio Cano, Gustavo Arcila Uribe and Coriolano Leudo.

On his own initiative he began work on The Ballad of Viceroy Solis, his first picture book manuscript done in watercolors.

In 1932 he begins to make illustrations for the literary section of the newspaper El Tiempo and the magazine Mundo al día. He works in ceramics and drawings with one of his pairs, who died later and in whose honor he creates the oil painting Death and the Maiden, considered, altogether with Women among clovers as one of the important works of Colombian twentieth century paintings. Although, his colleagues and students point out many correspondences and similarities with the pictorial works of his professor Francisco Antonio Cano. In his time plagiarism was thought between the recognized painting of Cano "The voluptuousness of the sea" and his pupil, Trujillo, with "The woman among clovers".

Toi et moi, is his second book manuscript with illustrations in watercolors and texts in ink and gold, with marked influence from art deco movement.

He was appointed director of the Department of Decorative Arts School Fine Arts Bogotá. And as director of publications of the Ministry of National Education.

The cover of Cantique de cantiques du roi Suleiman (Song of Songs of Solomon) was made in tin embossed with inlaid ceramic, and the pages made them, just like those in Toi et moi by his own hand by calligraphic transcription of the texts, "decorating and illuminating the capital letters with details using the aesthetics characteristics of medieval manuscripts but with his own stroke of a modern painter. In addition, each manuscript contains several of his drawings that recreate scenes and feelings evoked in songs or poems."

In the First Annual Hall Colombian Artists wins the silver medal with the works Pastora, Anunciación y Composición (Death and the Maiden). At the Second Annual Exhibition he won the gold medal with the oil Portrait of Mrs. Sara Dávila Ortiz, his wife.

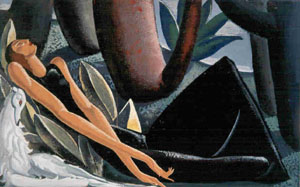
The Sleeping Beauty, watercolor on cardboard. Magnenat Sergio Trujillo (1932).

Trujillo Magnenat, a multifaceted artist, disciplined and refined, had humanistic education. He belongs to the generation of the pioneers of modern art in Colombia, who distinguished themselves away from the rigor of the classic rules . He was attentive to the international innovative spirit that the Bauhaus drove with its motto: "art and technique: a new unity". The mass dissemination of the work of art could be one of the fundamental objectives of Trujillo and a common denominator of the art of the period, with its growing interest in the murals, and the tendency to recover the applied arts which allow to create objects within reach of the common man. This became evident since he started illustrating the main newspapers and magazines in Colombia, and books, from children's stories to history textbooks and poetry.

He made murals in public places and in factories and lithographies which adorned public schools across the country; design of furniture, lamps, tiles and toys; and posters for cultural and sporting events, such as those made for the Bolivarian Games that were held in 1938, in Bogotá, in which stylized figures stand as well as particular volumes in a new sense of abstraction. The precision of the artist is revealed and unfolded, reason why critics recognize him as a versatile artist.

In outlining the dynamics of athletes speed of movement, he shows a characteristic and influence of Italian Futurism.

This type of works along with the covers made for the magazine America and the literary supplement for El Tiempo, in addition to his work in the Revista de las Indias and the children's magazine Rin Rin made him one of the pioneers of professional graphic design in the country.

He contributed to Colombian art and has been recognized for his skillful, dynamic, and precise line.

For his literary and artistic training, said the writer Germán Arciniegas, Trujillo departed from the Spanish tradition and later tended to follow French illustrators. The sharpness of his drawings show agility and good taste.

Some times his innovative air, is clear and consistent. Although he denied the validity of the avant-garde, his work has been some times modernist, some times romantic, some times realistic. He tried to break with tradition and academic art alternatives. His work is very eclectic, and can not be enrolled in one 'ism'. Trujillo is affirmed by the uniqueness of his work and without typecasting himself, does not remove what is seen, lived and felt in his time."

In the words of art critic Germán Rubiano, "within his generation, Sergio Trujillo Magnenat is an island figure. And it is because his work is too varied to limit it to very precise objectives and canons, and as is nationalistic in his oils and watercolors of savanna and coastal landscapes or its many illustrations of the country's history, and as it has sought to reach the people through several murals and countless drawings published in books, magazines and newspapers, also abounds in family portraits, ideals (or long remembered) figures; religious affairs and scenes of world history, particularly in his murals and illustrations."

There are many of his paintings with influences of "tenebrismo", pointillism, post-impressionism, symbolism, cubism, futurism, realism, art of Ancient Egypt and especially of art-deco.

His versatility allowed him to capture landscapes and cityscapes that were either oil or watercolor, and make family and friends portraits in charcoal, pencil and ink.

He used to take notes on the geographical location where he was, and later he embodied, from memory -photographic memory- the light and colors that he had seen. He also recreated, through painting, myths and legends, and ventured into surrealism in the 70s.

Art critics have found in him an Americanism style very near to the Mexican artists Orozco and Siqueiros. He recreated the murals of the battle of the "Pantano de Vargas" and the history of the Independence General José Hilario López.

In 1994, the Museum of Modern Art offered the most complete and meaningful retrospective of his work.

He died in Bogotá, Colombia, in 1999.

== Personal life ==
He was long time in love with Carolina Cárdenas, who refused him, and decided to marry another man.

Married to Sara Davila Ortiz, had six children Carolina Trujillo, Maria Cristina Trujillo, Maria Clara Trujillo, Jaime Trujillo, Sergio Trujillo, and Alberto Trujillo.

== See also ==
- Modern art
