= Marlie Casseus =

Haitian woman

Marlie Mychele Casseus (July 7, 1992 - March 11, 2024) was a Haitian woman who attracted national and international media attention when she received surgery to remove a 7-kg (18-pound) growth from her face that threatened her ability to eat, hear, breathe and see.

== Background ==
Casseus suffered from polyostotic fibrous dysplasia, a genetic condition in which the bone structure is replaced by connective tissue. This condition affects more than one bone in the body, impairs skeletal growth and development, and can cause deformity. The growth started when she was three years old, and by age 13, had continued to advance until her facial features were completely disfigured.

It blocked her nasal passage and most of her mouth so that she could only breathe and eat through a hole placed in the throat. Always a social impediment and a stigma, the growth eventually prompted her to become completely reclusive to avoid public ridicule. Before surgery, the bone growth had become a 7-kg (18-pound) tumor-like mass that covered almost her entire face. It was threatening her breathing and would have eventually caused blindness and death if doctors hadn't operated.

== Surgeries and post-op ==
Marlie became a patient of the International Kids Fund, a program of the Jackson Memorial Foundation, when her parents heard about a previous case in which IKF helped save a girl with a facial tumor. All surgeries were performed at the Holtz Children’s Hospital, at the University of Miami/Jackson Memorial Medical Center in Miami, Florida. Surgeries were performed by a team of doctors led by Venezuelan born and trained Dr. Jesús Gómez. The first surgery, in mid-December, 2005, was a 17-hour procedure that resulted in the removal of much of the growth from both sides of her face. During subsequent surgeries, doctors replaced part of her jaw with a titanium plate, rebuilt the interior of her nose and jaw, and drew her eyes and lips back together. Other bones were replaced with titanium and polyethylene implants.

After her initial surgeries, doctors indicated that Casseus might require further cosmetic surgeries at a later date, but indicated her growth would probably not return. Marlie has since had additional surgeries to rebuild her facial structure, center her eyes and remove her tracheotomy. After a succession of surgeries and a recuperation process, Marlie was allowed to return to her home of Port-au-Prince, Haiti in December 2006.

In June 2009, the International Kids Fund flew Marlie back to the United States for a seventh surgery to remove excess scar tissue and replace her facial implants. She will require follow-up surgeries and as such, the International Kids Fund continues to raise money for her medical care.

Marlie's journey was first documented on the Discovery Channel. Since then, her story has also been featured as an hour-long documentary on Discovery en Español's "Extraordinary Stories." A follow-up to the original Discovery Channel documentary was aired in September 2009.

A Haitian non-profit named Good Samaritan helped with transportation costs and the hospital's International Kids Fund collected donations for the surgery. Doctors and surgeons donated their time.

In 2012, Marlie began to experience difficulty breathing again and returned to Miami for follow-up treatment. After undergoing a CT scan and evaluation, her doctors determined her disease had returned once again, and she needed additional surgery. The operation was successfully performed in October 2012. Marlie continued to fly to Miami for follow-up treatments.

Casseus died in hospice care on March 11, 2024, after a long battle with health issues related to polyostotic fibrous dysplasia.
