= Yen Ospina =

Yen Ospina is a Colombian-American artist and community organizer based in Ithaca, New York, who specializes in murals. She is a self-taught artist who has sought inspiration from the Art Nouveau movement to explore social justice and activist themes. Ospina is best known for painting community-engaged murals, but she also works in mixed media and creates digital prints and zines. At least ten of her murals appear in public and commercial spaces in Ithaca, NY. Notably, in 2020, she was commissioned to paint a "Get Out the Vote" mural in the downtown area. The following year, Ospina's work was selected as a feature mural in the Ithaca Sciencenter mural project. Voted Ithaca's best visual artist in 2021 and 2022, Ospina focuses on developing local connections to grow business for artwork in Central New York State. In 2024, Ospina was commended for her work in New York State's southern tier promoting BIPOC and Latino artists. She had been newly elected president of the Latino Civic Association of Tompkins County, New York. As president of the Association, she has led efforts to build community through arts events, such as an annual Heritage Fiesta. She uses social media in addition to word-of-mouth communication to reach out to members of the Latine community and bring them together through the arts. In particular, Ospina promotes the work of BIPOC artists through the "Orozco Gallery," a curatorial organization she developed. The Orozco Gallery develops exhibitions, such as "Present Conversations II: Showcasing Talent of BIPOC Artists" (2023 and 2024), and events for showcasing artwork created by people of color and coordinating arts events in the Ithaca area.
