= Antonio Acero de la Cruz =

Antonio Acero de la Cruz (c. 1600–1668) was a Colombian artist of the colonial period. He was born in Bogotá, New Granada. His father was a Spanish artist Alonso Acero.

Apart from painting (many of them realized in religious buildings), Acero de la Cruz was also interested in architecture and poetry, some of which has survived to the present day. He appears as a character in the novel El desierto prodigioso y el prodigio de desierto, written by his friend Pedro de Solís y Valenzuela.
