= International Kids Fund =

U.S. nonprofit organization

International Kids Fund (IKF) is a non-profit, philanthropic program of Jackson Memorial Foundation committed to helping critically ill children primarily from Latin America and the Caribbean gain immediate access to essential medical treatments that are unavailable in their respective home countries.

== History ==
Located in Miami, Florida, the International Kids Fund was founded in response to an increasing number of desperate families from Latin America and the Caribbean who regularly showed up at Jackson Memorial Foundation seeking financial support for their sick children's medical treatment at Holtz Children's Hospital, which is prohibited by law to use publicly funded resources to care for non-residents of Miami-Dade County.

At first, Jackson Memorial Foundation assisted these families in identifying funds. But as the number of families increased, the foundation came to realize that a special organizational and financial infrastructure was needed to appropriately support these families.

By 2001, six-year-old Jean Gabriel Senior had just arrived to Holtz Children's Hospital to battle leukemia. Senior was in pain and critically ill. His family had exhausted all medical possibilities in their home country, the Dominican Republic, and could not afford to pay for Senior's medical care in the United States.

The hospital's administrators, physicians and benefactors united with Jackson Memorial Foundation to establish IKF, not only to help Senior, but all foreign children who arrive at Holtz seeking medical treatments that are not available in their home countries and that their families cannot afford.

On January 9, 2002, just days before his final treatment, Senior unexpectedly died. IKF continues to dedicate its ongoing efforts to his memory.

== IKF's Children ==
International Kids Fund has helped hundreds of children who could not find appropriate treatment in their home countries. Two of its most popular cases have involved young teenage girls with extremely large facial tumors.

In April 2008, IKF launched a fundraising campaign to help Lai Thi Dao, a young girl from Vietnam, who suffered from an extremely large, benign Schwannoma tumor on the right side of her face. Although common, the size of Lai's tumor was extremely rare. It had been growing since she was about three years old, and had begun to grow faster than the rest of her organs due to her high metabolism. Lai needed surgery to remove the tumor, which had severely deformed her face and was impairing her ability to breathe. After her surgery and recovery, Lai was featured on the national daytime talk show The Doctors. Lai's story was told all over the world and was covered by all national and international media outlets.

In 2009, International Kids Fund welcomed back a young Haitian teenager, Marlie Casseus, who needed follow-up surgery after doctors removed a 16-pound growth from her face. Casseus suffered from polyostotic fibrous dysplasia, a genetic condition in which the bone structure is replaced by connective tissue. Casseus first became a patient of IKF in 2005 when her parents heard about a previous medical case in which IKF helped save a girl with a facial tumor. She has had several surgeries since then to help reconstruct her face with titanium and polyethylene implants. Casseus's story also garnered international media attention. Casseus's journey was first documented on the Discovery Channel and has also been featured as an hour-long documentary on Discovery en Español's "Extraordinary Stories". A follow-up to the original Discovery Channel documentary aired on TLC.

== IKF's Mission ==
International Kids Fund seeks to provide life-saving medical care to needy children from Latin America and the Caribbean who suffer from life-threatening illnesses. The Fund will ensure these children receive the best care possible at the Holtz Children's Hospital in the University of Miami / Jackson Memorial Medical Center.

This unprecedented cause, a unique vehicle for philanthropic outreach to the Caribbean and Latin America, will be fueled by the generous support of individuals and organizations from the international community who want to help these children stay alive.

== Eligibility ==
Eligibility for sponsorship by IKF is determined by the following criteria:

- The child must be fighting a medical condition that cannot be treated in his or her home country.
- His or her family lacks health insurance and the financial resources to pay for the required health care treatment.
- He or she is not a U.S. citizen or resident, as U.S. citizens or residents qualify for government aid.
- Doctors believe he or she has a good chance of getting cured.
- His or her medical condition will not require lifelong medical care.
- Transplant cases are only eligible if a sponsor has already committed to providing financial support.

== About Holtz Children's Hospital ==
Named for a landmark gift by Fana and Abel Holtz, Holtz Children's Hospital at University of Miami/Jackson Memorial Medical Center is one of the largest and most respected children's hospitals in the nation – a hospital that treats more children than any other hospital in Florida.

Holtz's Pediatric Transplant Center, one of the largest in the entire nation, is the only center in Florida capable of performing every type of transplant, and is one of three centers in the country specializing in pediatric multiple-organ transplants. The hospital is the largest birthing center in the state, and its Neonatal Intensive Care Unit is among the largest and most respected in the country. Through a partnership with University of Miami and nearly $20 million in annual research and training funding, Holtz Children's Hospital is one of the top pediatric clinical research centers in the United States and the largest in Florida.

As a part of a public hospital dedicated to serving every person in need, Holtz is also South Florida's number one source of medical care for children without financial resources. Through International Kids Fund, it provides medical care to needy children from all over the world who suffer from serious illnesses and cannot get such care in their own countries.
