= Sandra Llano-Mejía =

Colombian multimedia artist (born 1951)

Sandra Isabel Llano-Mejía
- Born: 1951 (age 74–75); Cali, Colombia
- Education: Instituto Departamental de Bellas Artes, Escuela Nacional de Artes Plásticas, National Autonomous University of Mexico, Metropolitan Autonomous University
- Occupation: Multimedia artist
- Known for: Video art, performance art, installation art, xerox art
- Website: Official website

Sandra Isabel Llano-Mejía (born 1951) is a Colombian multimedia artist. She is considered "a pioneer of video art in Latin America". In the 1970s and 1980s, Llano-Mejía's video art was shown throughout Mexico and the United States. She has an interest in technology in her artwork, such as computers and medical equipment. In the 1970s Llano-Mejía worked in xerox art.

Llano-Mejía attended Instituto Departamental de Bellas Artes in Cali, Colombia; followed by studies at Escuela Nacional de Artes Plásticas (ENAP) in Mexico City; National Autonomous University of Mexico; and Metropolitan Autonomous University in Mexico City. Her work can be found in the museum collections at the Museum of Modern Art.

== See also ==
- List of Colombian women artists
- Marta Minujín
- Pola Weiss Álvarez
- María Evelia Marmolejo
