= Sara Modiano =

Colombian artist (1951–2010)

- Born: January 11, 1951; Barranquilla, Colombia
- Died: 2010

Sara Modiano (1951 – 2010) was a Colombian artist known for her performance art and photography.

Her art explores themes of human identity, emotion, sexuality, and the feminine body. The Sara Modiano Foundation for the Arts was established in her honor and offers annual grants to qualified artists.

== Life and career ==
Sara Modiano was born on January 11, 1951, in Barranquilla, Colombia. She studied mathematics at the University of Los Andes in Bogotá and art at the School of Fine Arts at Atlantic University in Barranquilla. She has had solo and group exhibitions at the Museum of Modern Art in Bogotá, the Museum of Latin American Art, the Hammer Museum, the Brooklyn Museum, and the Caribbean Regional Artists Salon.

In the 1990s, she transitioned from painting and sculpture to performance art and photography. Her Fragmented series, including Inside Out and Conexión Interior, used macro photography and geometric overlays to represent sensations as abstract concepts.

== Death ==
Modiano was diagnosed with ovarian cancer in 2006, and died in 2010. In the four years before her death she focused on performance art.

== Legacy ==
Sara Modiano's professional career spanned forty years. Her work was included in several International Kids Fund (IKF) Latin American Art Auctions and is associated with the Barranquilla movement of the 1980s.

Modiano’s work is held in the permanent collection of the Museum of Modern Art in Bogotá. Since 2013, the Sara Modiano Foundation for the Arts has administered the Sara Modiano Grant, an annual award designated for emerging Latin American artists in Colombia.

== Artwork ==
- Cube Project, 2004
- Posibilidad de dos ventanas, 1977
- Cuatro ventanas, 1977
- Desaparece una cultura, 1981
- Intimate, 2002
- Reflect, 2007

=== Solo exhibitions ===
- 1974: Barrios Gallery, Barranquilla, Colombia
- 1975: Belarca Gallery, Bogotá, Colombia
- 1979: Centro Colombo Americano, Barranquilla, Colombia
- 1979: Galeria de la Oficina, Medellín, Colombia
- 1981: Garces Velasquez Gallery, Bogotá, Colombia
- 1982: Quintero Gallery, Barranquilla, Colombia
- 2003: La Resistencia de L’Art, Mallorca, Spain
- 2003: CUBE I: Multi Media Art Experience Art Loves Design, Art Basel, Miami Beach, Florida
- 2004: Featured Artist, Art Miami 2004, Miami Beach Convention Center, Miami, Florida
- 2004: CUBE II: Multi Media Art Experience Art Loves Design, Art Basel, Miami Beach, Florida

=== Public collections (selection) ===
Modiano's work is featured in several public and private collections across the Americas, including

- Pérez Art Museum Miami, Florida
- Bogotá Museum of Modern Art (MAMBO), Colombia
- Hammer Museum, at University of California (UCLA)
