= Gloria Ortiz Delgado =

Colombian jurist (born 1969)

Gloria Stella Ortiz Delgado (born 7 January 1969) is a Colombian jurist who has been President of the country's Constitutional Court since February 2019.

== Early life and education ==
Ortiz was born in Suan Juan de Pasto, Nariño on 7 January 1969. She has a degree in law from the Universidad Externado de Colombia, postgraduate specialisation in Constitutional Law from the University of the Andes and a Master's in Law with an emphasis in Public Law from the Universidad Externado.

== Career ==
Ortiz worked as an attorney, guardianship lawyer and assistant magistrate from 1992. She was also a joint judge of the Administrative Court of Cundinamarca. From April 2012 until May 2014 she was an advisor to the country's Attorney General, Eduardo Montealegre, where she created the Constitutional Law department. She has lectured at Sergio Arboleda University, Del Rosario University and University of La Sabana. Ortiz co-authored a textbook on Constitutional jurisprudence on human rights.

Ortiz was appointed a Magistrate of the Constitutional Court of Colombia by the Senate on 3 July 2014. In 2018, she was appointed Chair of the National Gender Commission of the Judiciary. She was appointed President of the Court in February 2019. Upon her appointment, she named defense of individual rights, judicial independence, and freedom from politics as the three most important conditions for success as a constitutional judge.

Within days of her appointment, Ortiz issued a joint statement with Council of State President Lucy Bermudez and War Crimes Tribunal president Patricia Linares criticizing outgoing US Ambassador Kevin Whitaker for revoking the visas of three judges as meddling in the country's peace process. Later that month, the Senate asked the court to rule on the legality of a law to implement peace agreement with FARC rebels. The court upheld the Senate's vote to reject President Iván Duque Márquez's proposed changes. Ortiz called on Duque to implement the agreement and create a Special Jurisdiction for Peace tribunal.

In May 2020, Ortiz acted as rapporteur in the court's decision that state of emergency measures enacted by legislative decree in response to the COVID-19 pandemic were constitutional.

== Selected publications ==
- Ortiz Delgado, Gloria; Palacios Sanabria, Maria Teresa; Duenas Ruiz, Oscar Jose; Ospina Duque, Edgar; Orjuela Ramírez, Blanca Patricia (2009). "Constituciones y control constitucional en Colombia". In Johana del Pilar Cortes Nieto (ed.). Itinerario de la Jurisprudencia colombiana de control constitucional como mecanismo de protección de derechos humanos (in Spanish). Universidad del Rosario. pp. 77–115. ISBN 9789587380361.
- Ortiz Delgado, Gloria Stella. Itinerario de la jurisprudencia constitucional en derechos humanos (in Spanish).
