= Maria Clara Trujillo =

Colombian artist (born 1948)

Maria Clara Trujillo (Macala)
- Born: Maria Clara Trujillo Davila; November 27, 1948 (age 77); Bogotá, Colombia
- Known for: Painter, sculptor

- Website: www.macala.net

Maria Clara Trujillo (Macala) (born 27 November 1948) is an artist and sculptor from Bogotá, Colombia. She is a daughter of the painter Sergio Trujillo Magnenat and the ceramist Sara Dávila. She grew up in an environment that cultivated her passion for artistic expression.

After studying architecture, art and education, she started painting professionally in 1986 and made her first exhibition in Kingston (Jamaica) in 1990, followed by several exhibitions in art galleries and museums in Colombia, France and the United States.

Her art comprises several techniques and styles, from the colorful Colombian landscapes in watercolors, acrylics and oils to expressive human figures in pastels, monotypes and sculptures in clay, bronze and latex.

== Style ==
Her work includes landscapes and human figures using a variety of techniques: watercolors, pastels, ink, acrylics, charcoal, monoprints, au temple, clay, bronze and plastics.

== Exhibitions ==
- Galería el Callejón, 1997
- Bogotá Tennis Club, 1998
- Rambouillet Salon, Île-de-France (France)
- Côte d'Azur, Cannes, Val d'Or (France)
- Centre d'Art St. Jean, Bruges (Belgium)
- Poirel Nancy (France)
- Houston, Texas (United States)
