= Nadia Granados =

Colombian performance artist (born 1978)

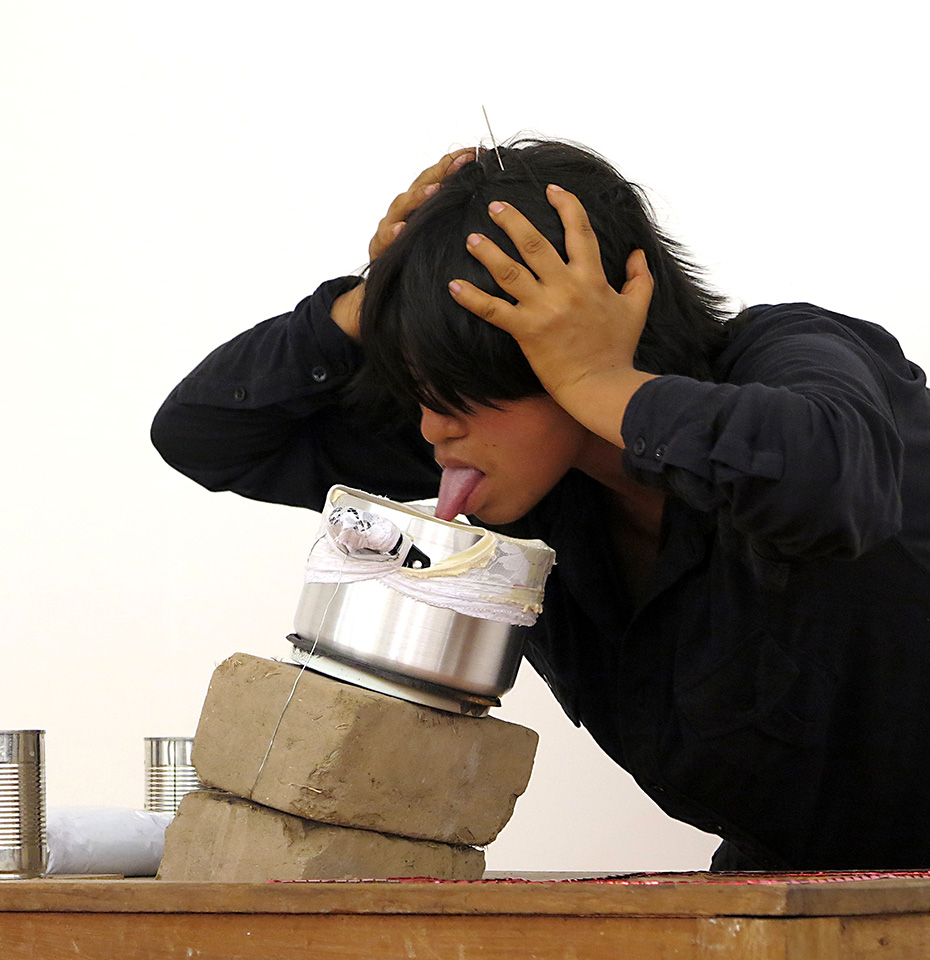
Granados in her performance “Derramada” ca. 2014

Nadia Granados(Nadia M. Granados Delgado) (born May 3, 1978 in Bogotá, Colombia) is a Colombian performance artist who uses her body concept in combination with multi-media technologies to explore relationships between the representation of state violence in mainstream media, institutionalized machismo, heterosexual pornography and violence against women.

== Work ==
Granados' performances are interlacing grass roots activist strategies (for example, public intervention in real-life and virtual public places) with visual media technology (such as mixing closed-circuit video with mash up video art projections). In her live performance show El Cabaret La Fulminante she employs an alter ego, La Fulminante. This sardonic parody of an over-sexualized Latina character speaks in an unknown, possibly indigenous but fictional language, which is then dubbed via video projection with hyper-political subtitles, creating an uncomfortable mix of eroticism on the one hand and radical left polemics on the other. By contrasting these antagonisms, Granados invites the viewer to reconsider their ideas on post-colonialism, gender stereotypes, auto-representation, and pornographic imagery, while simultaneously exposing manipulative, pop-cultural media strategies and openly promoting the rejection of neo-liberal, imperialist values.

In 2013, the Granados was awarded the 28th Franklin Furnace Fund, NYC, for her performance Carro Limpio, consciencia sucia.

Granados has presented her work in Colombia, Argentina, Brazil, Ecuador, Mexico, Peru, Venezuela and Canada, as well as in France, Italy, Spain, and Germany.

"Queda Lejos del Corazón," "Colombianización," and a bunch of Cabarets are some of her pieces. However, additional to her performances, workshops, lectures, academic texts, and critical texts are also part of her work. http://nadiagranados.com/wordpress/

In January 2014, one of her video works, entitled Maternidad Obligatoria, created a media controversy in Spain, when internet hackers inserted it into the web page of the Catholic archbishop of Granada in Spain.

== Selected exhibitions ==
2013	Hemisphere Institute of Performance and Politics - Town. Body. Acción. Political Passions in the Americas, São Paulo, Brazil
2013	Pamplona International Performance Art Festival, Pamplona, Spain
2012	Videodrama. Museo de Arte Contemporáneo de Rosario (MACRO), Rosario, Argentina
2011	La International Cuir. Museo de Arte Reina Sofía, Madrid, Spain, curated by Beatriz Preciado

== Awards ==
2014	3rd Biannual Award for Visual Arts, Fundación Gilberto Alzate Avendaño (FUGA), Bogotá, Colombia
2013	28th Franklin Furnace Fund, New York City, USA
