= Alberto Gomez Gomez =

American artist

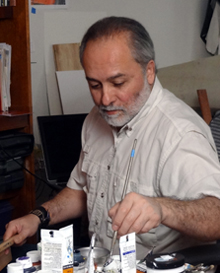
- Gomez Gomez in 2014
- Born: December 12, 1956 (age 69); Bogotá, Colombia
- Education: Escuela de Artes Plasticas, Universidad Distrital. Master: Manuel Reyes Navarro
- Known for: Painting, Master Print Making, Mural Painting, Wood Cutting
- Spouse(s): Laura Agudelo (married 1974-1981); Luz Stella Gómez Barrios (married 1990)

Alberto Gomez Gomez (born December 12, 1956) is a figurative artist, painter and master print maker. Born in Bogotá, Colombia, Gomez Gomez became a citizen of the United States on July 29, 2011. He is best known for producing monumentally scaled murals in the United States and Colombia. His art can also be found in private collections throughout the European capitals of Spain, Belgium, South Africa, Russia, Germany, the United Kingdom, and Italy. His signature style depicts people, figures, and daily life. His works often address spiritual, social, philosophical, historical, and political events and issues, although often in a humorous way.

== Early life ==
Alberto Gomez Gomez was born the second of seven children to Luis Horacio Gomez and Alicia Gomez. His work was strongly affected by his mother being diagnosed with bipolar disorder when he was a young boy. He wrote of his mother's crises:

"I marveled at my mother's perceptions of the world around her. For her, in her manic phases; past, present and future occupied the same mental space. Her passionate proclamations were focused, awful, beautiful, overwhelming. To bring to any piece of work that compelling sense of clarity, certainty and interrelation — that has always been my greatest challenge."

His secondary education began at the Escuela de Artes Plásticas (School of Fine Arts) of Universidad Distrital (District University Francisco José de Caldas of Bogotá) where he pursued a liberal arts curriculum and became interested in the intellectual currents of the day including aesthetics, politics and the human condition, regularly attending seminars presented by Latin American and international speakers such as Néstor García Canclini, Carlos Monsiváis, Gerardo Mosquera and Jean-François Lyotard. During this time, he worked and studied in Jaime Castillo's studio. He subsequently left Bogotá for Venezuela where he continued his studies at Colegio Universitario de Caracas. While in Venezuela, he worked as a monitor and student of Manuél Reyes Navarro, of Barquisimeto, Venezuela.

== Career ==
In a career spanning over thirty-nine years Alberto Gomez Gomez has achieved recognition for his murals, paintings, drawings and print making editions, with exhibitions throughout Latin America and the United States. His art is collected by many museums, major corporations and private collectors. Now a naturalized citizen of the United States, he has created 31 murals in Washington, DC, Michigan, Florida, and New Mexico. Despite the often temporary nature of outdoor artwork, much of his early work can still be found in highly visible places in Bogotá, New York City, Washington D.C., Daytona Beach, DeLand, Port Orange, Miami, Midland, Lubbock, Santa Fe, and Orlando. In Central America his work is found in private collections in Panama and Mexico. Prior to his move to the U.S., Gomez Gomez was well established as a prominent artist in South America and his works can be found in many private and public places there.

Gomez Gomez's first exhibition took place in 1979 at Casacoima in Guanare, capital of Portuguesa State in Venezuela in a group show along with other artists from the region. From 1975 to 1981, Gomez Gomez found work in Bogotá and in Venezuela as a freelance designer, typographer, illustrator and graphic artist for various small producers of wine, perfume, fashion products and the like, eventually working to produce massive photo-litho images. It was in this period that Gomez Gomez became interested in pursuing work in large murals. His first one-man show was held in 1981 at the Ateneo Popular in Guanare, Venezuela. Gomez Gomez's first prominent mural was Caldas Tutelar, commissioned by the Consejo Superior (board of directors) of the Universidad Distrital of Bogotá, painted in 1987 (subsequently restored by the artist in 2013). In 1981, Gomez Gomez returned to Bogotá where he accepted positions as Professor of Art History and fine art drawing for CIDCA (a regional college in Bogotá) for twelve years. Concurrently, he conducted classes and workshops at Universidad Pedagógica Nacional de Colombia in advanced color theory, textural representations in painting, anatomy and painting technique. He subsequently spent most of 1996 at the Archivo General de la Nación (The National Archive of Colombia) in Bogotá, conducting research on the History of Art in Colombia. For the past few decades, he has lived between Orlando and Daytona Beach, in a largely rural section of Deltona, Florida. He has had exhibits in major cities worldwide. In March 2002, he concurrently presented his portrait of Florida's First Lady, Columba Bush; he was named Artist of the Month by The Orlando Museum of Art; and he was selected to receive the Simon Bolivar Prize as "Central Florida's Best Latin American Artist."

He realized works in London, Barcelona, Rome, and Mumbai.

== Style ==
Gomez Gomez's style is often realistic with regards to the objects and people in his paintings, but often mix present, past and future in one painting. His work often depicts physical relationships between objects, people, buildings, and landscape to be inclusive of one another, or side by side, though they clearly belong to disparate time frames. In some canvases, subtly impossible points of view (which are ostensibly suggested to occupy three dimensions) are inserted into standard layouts of vanishing line perspective — in the same picture plane — in ways that can at once be convincingly real, albeit vaguely unsettling.

Sounds A mural in five panels by Alberto Gomez Gomez. 2005. acrylic on board. 180" X 48"

Gomez Gomez's work often typifies self-contradictory reference to the key subject matter; for example, the father referred to in a title may appear in the painting as a baby boy while his children are painted as elderly and doddering, or an otherwise sober and traditional Old World square in a Latin American city may feature a gigantic iguana painted in a shallow depth of field, poised to leap off the canvas directly at the viewer. In his mural Sounds, Cuban Salsa legend Celia Cruz is accompanied by an anonymous bare-chested man drumming on a plastic bucket suggesting, in the words of El Nuevo Herald's Adriana Herrera, a "concert which would imply an impossible musical fusion, joining Beethoven's Ninth Symphony with Azúcar de la Guarachera of Cuba". This is a concert that Herrera calls a "riot of joy" which impossibly includes Louis Armstrong and Beethoven who seems to be listening intently to Pavarotti and Ray Charles.

This style is used to convey political commentary, self deprecating humor, deep spiritual commitment, or all of the above, depending on the piece.

== Controversy ==
Daydreamer by Alberto Gomez Gomez. 2002. acrylic on canvas. 34"X34"

Gomez Gomez found himself at odds with the public opinion, taste and morés of Central Florida at the beginning of the new millennium. His work was censured, and for a time, effectively censored due to the perception by certain Florida State Attorney's Office employees that two paintings commissioned by and delivered to the Volusia County Courthouse in DeLand, Florida might be considered offensive to the public. In one painting, My Father, a depiction of an old-fashioned Colombian soldier was thought to resemble a satanic figure. This may actually have been incited from a reaction to Daydreamer, in which the artist copied his six-year-old nephew's drawing of a doll, the Sun and a cat into the background to represent a child's imagination. This image was subsequently interpreted as an (anatomically correct) little red devil by members of the Florida State Attorney's office — instead of the innocent child's drawing that was intended by the artist. As part of a decision by a Volusia County Manager, the paintings were removed from the main exhibition space immediately.

The ensuing outcry in the press by staff writers, fine arts writer Laura Stewart and entertainment writer Rick de Yampert (both of the Daytona Beach News Journal) as well as a number of letters to the editor, caused the State Attorney's Office to re-examine their position on this matter and the result came in the form of a draft of new legislation bearing directly on the offices of The State of Florida concerning censorship. It had little effect as regards the display of Gomez Gomez paintings, however. They were moved to an unspecified location in the County Courthouse building said by representatives of the State Attorney's office to be a "very public location," though they were not restored to their original position in the main exhibition space.
