= Ruby Rumié =

Colombian artist (born 1958)

- Born: Ruby Rumié; 1958 (age 67–68); Cartagena, Colombia
- Known for: Painting, Sculpture, Photography, Video and Installation.
- Awards: Women Together Award from the United Nations, Rockefeller Foundation Fellowship Residency on Human Behavior and First Place in the "Colombia.Image"

Ruby Rumié (born 1958) is a Colombian artist. She studied at the School of Fine Arts of Cartagena de Indias and the David Manzur Academy in Bogotá. She has exhibited around the world in places such as Colombia, Chile, the United States of America and France.

Her work was shown in the international section of the First Biennial of Contemporary Art of Cartagena de Indias, Colombia

== Early life and education ==
Ruby Rumié was born in Cartagena, Colombia in 1958.

From 1968 to 1970 Rumié attended Acedemia Nohra Lenon in Cartagena, Colombia. From 1977 to 1980 to the Academia David Manzur in Bogotá, Colombia, and later, from 1980 to 1984, she studied painting, drawing and sculpture at the Academia de Bellas Artes in Cartagena, Colombia.

In 1978, she developed the short film "Magola" with Director Ricardo Cifuentes and was part of La Pandonga Theatre Group from 1980 to 1981 in Cartagena de Indias.

Rumié also participated in various workshops, including art workshops with Jean Pierre Accoult, Maria Teresa Hincapié, Guillermo Londoño and Eugenio Dittborn, a poetry workshop, with Raúl Gómez Jattin, a printing workshop, with Fabian Rendon, and a contemporary dance workshop, with D. Duppuy.

Today she lives and works between Cartagena, Colombia and Santiago, Chile.

== Career and artwork ==
Ruby Rumié began her art career as a hyper realistic portraitist. She developed a strong relationship with the materials and the techniques she used and soon transformed her methods into more conceptual ones. As the artist confronted the question of what's an artist duty to society and the issues in social structures, she started including the community more in her artwork and thus allowing the community to think about their place in society, question their surroundings and their social situations. Her projects began to be based on the impacts of modern life on everyday people, injustice, gentrification, hierarchies, race inequalities and violence against women.

Projects:

- Retratos (1990)
- Ensamblajes (1996)
- Obra Negra (1998)
- Colombia Se Vende y Se Arrienda (2000)
- Espíritu Gimaní (2000)
- Historias Horizontales y Poemas Verticales (2001)
- Fachadas (2001)
- Teselas (2001–2004)
- Camina Sobre Ella (2004- 2005)
- No Se lo Digas a Nadie (2006)
- Lo Real de Las Cosas (2007)

Rumié photographed all the inhabitants of a popular street from Cartagena, Colombia and asked them to pick one of their favorite objects to create Lo Real de las Cosas.

- Getsemaní: Sujeto /Objeto (2003–2012)

Getsemaní: Sujeto /Objeto refers to the gentrification that is happening Getsemaní, a traditional colonial town in Cartagena, Colombia. Rumié represented the neighborhood through photographs, videos, and paintings which were shown as cartography of human territory. Along with the exhibition there was a round table discussion titled, Getsemaní, five minutes of grace. In this discussion a group of professionals from different backgrounds share their thoughts about the displacement that is taking place in this neighborhood.

- Descalzos recursos (2007)
- Por mayor y Detalle (2009)

This project explores the value of memory in a place at risk of transformation, the supermarket El Cartonal de Valparaiso in Chile. This project looks at the emblematic supermarket that is being threatened by modern supermarkets and at its people. She investigates the richness of the cultures, traditions and trades passed down from one generation to another through photographs and census. She transforms the people of this place into objects, prints them onto industrial packaging and sells them in bulk representing the disappearance of the customs and traditions that are part of peoples memories and cultures.

- El Cortocircuito (2009)

El Cortocircuito is a poster that looks like a newspaper that illustrates with humor, images and texts the reason for the celebration of the independence of Cartagena de Indias. This document can be made into a hat that people wear during the celebration and keep as a souvenir. Ruby Rumié came up with this idea after she stumbled into a photographic archive that had been worked on for over 20 years by someone from the neighborhood. Rumié took these images, cleaned them up and digitized them to give them a new life. She then simulated the image of a newspaper and inserted the images along with text.

- Lugar Común (2009-2013)

Lugar Común is a body of work that explored the relationships between domestic employees and their employers. Ruby Rumié worked with Justine Graham to investigate the hierarchical relationships between the employee and employer and explain the unwritten social conventions that have existed throughout time in Latin America, especially in Colombia, Argentina and Chile. Rumié took 50 house keepers and partnered them with their employers, she dressed them all in white t-shirts and took photographs of them. By placing the women in a different context and dressing them the same way she made it possible to find commonalities between them despite their cultural and economic differences.

She also created a questionnaire in which she asked all the women about themselves, including questions about their dreams and hopes and other personal information and created a visualization that was published in El Malpensante and the Chilean magazine Paula.

- Mi mickey [atrapados por un ratón] (2010)
- Feria (2010)

Feria is the result of three cultural initiatives for social entrepreneurship that would contribute to the improvement of the people of Catagena de Indias living conditions.Along with the support of Cristo Hoyos, she created a workshop with 34 artisans from around Cartagena to create costumes to be used for the Fiestas de la Independencia.

- Hálito Divino (2013)

Halito Divino or Divine Breath is A project in which Rumié tells the story of women who suffered from domestic abuse, empowering them and allowing them to cleanse themselves from the pain caused by their experiences. With the help of social workers from various neighborhoods in Cartagena de Indias, 100 women who experienced domestic abuse, blew their breath into a ceramic vase that was meant to symbolize a vessels that would hold and seal their pain. After breathing into the vase each participant was given a jewel in the shape of a woman to accompany them and remind them of their experience.

She later decided to crown the 100 vases to pay tribute to the women and make visible the reconstruction of their lives despite their fight, struggles and losses.

- Tejiendo Calle (2016–2017)
- Tejiendo Calle or Weaving Streetsis a project that came from an encounter Ruby Rumié had with Dominga Torres Tehran, a woman who has sold fish for over 45 years. With this project, Rumié wanted to bring attention to those middle-age and elderly women who have walked the streets of Colombia for years, unnoticed. She wants to present a new way of looking at these street vendors and their environment through photographs, photo albums, video, and stamps to pay tribute to these women. Ruby Rumié brings to the foreground the image of someone who is used to being rejected and ignored by doing this she challenges the social norm and problems such as gender violence, gentrification, social barriers and discrimination.

== Awards ==
Ruby Rumié received first place in the Colombian open call, "Colombian.Image" in 2004 in Paris, France.

In 2016, she received the Rockefeller Foundation Fellowship and did a residency on human behavior at Bellagio Lake Como.

In 2017, Rumié received a Women Together Award from the United Nations in New York.

== Recent solo exhibitions ==
In 2010, Ruby Rumié showed at the Museo de Artes Visuales in Santiago Chile, " Common Place".

In 2001 she showed at "Fair," Centro de Formación de la Cooperación Española (CFCE), Cartagena de Indias.

From 2011 to 2012, "Common Place" was shown at the Art Museum of the Americas in Washington D.C.

In 2012, "Getsemani: Subject/Object," was exhibited at NH Galería, Cartagena de Indias.

In 2014, "Hálito Divino," was shown at the Centro de Formación de la Cooperación Española in Cartagena de Indias and the Nohra Haime Gallery, New York.

In 2016, NH Galería showed "Art Paris, Hálito Divino" in Paris.

From 2016 to 2017, "Tejiendo Calle," was exhibited at the NH Galería in Cartagena de Indias.

In 2017, she had a show at the Museo de Arte Moderno in Cartagena de Indias, " Tejiendo Calle- Weaving Streets" was shown at Nohra Haime Gallery in New York and she had a self-titled show at El Nogal Bogotá.

In 2018, she showed at La Tertulia Museum in Cali, Colombia and Museo Rayo in Roldanillo, Colombia.

== Recent group exhibitions ==
Rumié has also been part of many group exhibitions in place such as Nohra Haime Gallery in New York, NH Galería in Colombia, Lyme Academy of Fine Arts in Connecticut, Atrium Gallery in Saint Louis, Missouri, ArtBo, Bogotá, PULSE Miami Beach in Florida, International Biennial of Contemporary Art of Cartagena de Indias, Art Madrid and Colección Banco de la República in Cartagena de Indias.

== Teaching, panels, talks and lectures ==
Ruby Rumié is involved with the community not only through her art but also through teaching, being part of panels, talks and lectures.

In '2010, she did a talk for participating graduates at the Universitaria de Bellas Artes in Cartagena de Indias Colombia, that same year she did a lecture called, " The Individual body and the Social Body" for the Contemporary Studies of Dance at the Colegio del Cuerpo in the University of Jorge Tadeo Lozano in Cartagena de Indias, in collaboration with Justine Graham she did a talk about the project "Lugar Común" for the psychology students at the University of Chile and held a multidisciplinary panel on the relation between the housekeeper and her employer in Latin America at the Museo de Artes Visuales in Santiago, Chile. She also held a conversation on the Getsemani neighbors, along with the exhibition of the Caribbean Contemporary Art Collection of the Banco de la Republica.

In 2011, Ruby Rumié gave two talks in Colombia, one at Bucaramanga, "La fábrica de la mirada" and at "Fair" Centro de Formación de la Cooperación Española.

In 2012, Rumié was part of a multidisciplinary panel for the exhibition Getsemani: Sujeto / Objeto at NH Galería and "Propuesta: En que nos parecemos?" a talk about artistic practices in context at the Universidad Jorge Tadeo Lozano Caribe.

In 2014, she was part of a talk during International Women's day at the Centro de Formación de la Cooperación Española in Cartagena called "Halito Divino: Violencia de Género - Miradas desde el Arte," and " Sin mujeres no hay paz" at the same space.

In 2015, she was part of the jury, Stimuli Grants, BIACI in Cartagena.

In 2016, she was part of "The Body in Art" Fepal Symposium of Latin American Psychoanalytic Association at the Escuela de Bellas Artes in Cartagena, a Women Empowerment talk at the Bellagio Center in Italy for the Rockefeller Foundation and "Women and Dignity" at the Centro de Información de la Cooperación Española in Cartagena de Indias. And in 2017, "Weaving Streets" at the Humanese in Envigado Colombia and conversation with Alberto Abello Vives on "Weaving Streets" at the NH Galería in Cartagena, Colombia.

== Public collections ==
Ruby Rumié's work is owned by AMA I Art Museum of the Americas AMA Collection, Washington, D.C., Andreas and Mecky Dybowsky Collection, Korweiler, Germany, Centro Cultural de la Guajira, Guajira, Colombia, Centro de Formación de la Cooperación Española, Cartagena de Indias, Colección BANREP, Banco de la República, Cartagena de Indias, Imago Mundi, Treviso, Italy, Mayor's office, Cartagena de Indias, Museo de Arte Moderno, Cartagena de Indias.
