= Viviana Spinosa =

Colombian designer and digital artist

- Born: 1984 (age 41–42)
- Education: National University of Colombia; London School of Business and Finance; Chelsea College of Arts
- Website: www.vivianaespinosa.com

Viviana Ramírez Spinosa (born 31 August 1984) is a Colombian designer and digital artist.

== Biography ==
Spinosa attended the San Jose Hermanos Maristas de Pereira School until 2001. Her training in art began at the University of Quindío, in the Faculty of Fine Arts, and continued until 2005. She then studied at the National University of Colombia in Bogotá, between 2006 and 2010. She studied English at The London School of Business and Finance between 2009 and 2012 at the same time that she began her studies in digital art at the Chelsea College of Arts. She studied mural and graffiti techniques at the Art Institute of Philadelphia.

Spinosa has exhibited at several venues within the Gran Colombia University, in the Military Club of Bogotá, in Arango Insulation, in the State of Georgia in the United States, in the Casa Santa María in Bogota, Perspectives of the feminine exhibition in Bogotá in April 2017, at the Panache Gallery in Philadelphia. She painted the mural of the Pact for innovation at the Javeriana University in Bogotá. She made part of the collective exhibitions 40 years and 40 artists from the Quindío in 2006; Dreams, loves and life, at the Galería Cero in 2006. She was invited to CAOS: Artisti colombiani nell'ottava di santegidio ad orte in Rome, Italy, in 2009 and in Art Basel 2014 at the Miami Art Show Wynwood. She is the founder of the art festival Artistas vuelven al Quindío. She was the artist selected by the Enrique Grau House Museum and the Governor of Quindío to take make an intervention in a sculpture by Enrique Grau Araújo, a Rita, that she made in a version with motifs of the Coffee Axis in 2017, and that today rests in the arbor of the Constitution Park of Armenia.
