= Natalia Arbelaez =

American ceramicist, educator (born 1983)

- Born: 1983 (age 42–43); Miami, Florida, U.S.
- Education: Florida International University (BFA), Ohio State University (MFA)
- Occupations: Ceramicist, sculptor, educator
- Website: nataliaarbelaez.com

Natalia Arbelaez (born 1983) is an American ceramicist, sculptor, and educator. Her figurative sculptures draw from her Colombian heritage, the history of pre-Columbian art and ceramics, and her identity as a first generation Colombian American. She has taught art at the University of Washington in Seattle, since 2024.

== Early life and education ==
Natalia Arbelaez was born in 1983, in Miami, Florida, to immigrant parents from Colombia. The first four years of her childhood were spent in Medellín, Colombia, followed by a move to Bristol, Connecticut, and a move at age 10 to Miami, Florida. Her history of migration caused an issue of ethnic identity in her youth, and she went through a process of cultural exploration; and had to relearned the Spanish language after moving to Miami.

Arbelaez received a B.F.A. degree (2011) from Florida International University in Westchester, Florida; and a M.F.A. degree (2015) from Ohio State University in Columbus, Ohio.

== Career ==
In 2018, Arbelaez was named the emerging artist by the National Council on Education for the Ceramic Arts (NCECA). In 2018 to 2019, she was the resident artist at Harvard University, where she was able to researched pre-Columbian art. This research influenced her ceramics practice, which reveals Latin American, and Amerindian history, as well as United States history. Her work has themes of gender, and reproduction. She creates her figurative sculptures in terracotta, and often juxtaposes other glazes such as gold or white majolica glaze.

Arbelaez's artwork is in museum collections, including at the Fuller Craft Museum in Brockton, Massachusetts; the Everson Museum of Art in Syracuse, New York; Museum of Arts and Design in New York City; and at the ICA Miami.
