= Gloria Ortiz-Hernandez =

Colombian artist and sculptor (born 1943)

- Born: 1943; Cali, Colombia
- Education: Marymount College, Tarrytown
- Style: Contemporary Art, Abstract Art
- Website: www.gloriaortizhernandez.com

Gloria Ortiz-Hernandez (born 1943) is a Colombian artist and sculptor known for her drawing and painting.

== Collections ==
- Seattle Art Museum
- Museum of Modern Art, New York
- Essex Collection of Art from Latin America
- Harvard Art Museums
- Morgan Library & Museum, New York
- Museum of Fine Arts Houston
