= La Cumbre, Valle del Cauca =

La Cumbre
- Municipality and Town
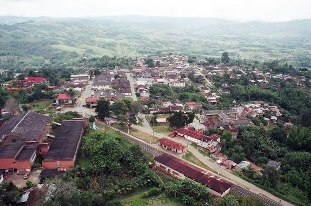

- Flag Coat of arms

- Location within Colombia
- Coordinates: 3°38′58.67″N 76°34′6.08″W
- Country: Colombia
- Department: Valle del Cauca

Area
  - Total: 235 km^{2} (91 sq mi)
- Elevation: 1,500 m (4,900 ft)

Population (2015)
  - Total: 11,512
  - Density: 49.0/km^{2} (127/sq mi)

La Cumbre (The Summit) is a town and municipality in Colombia, northwest of Cali, in the Valle del Cauca Department. It is located in the West Andes above the city of Yumbo.

La Cumbre is known for its simplicity, lack of hustle and bustle and small-town way of life. Many day tourists from Cali travel to La Cumbre by car or tourist train. The weather is cooler, and considered a welcome respite from the sunny and often hot weather of Cali. The most important industry in the area is agriculture.

== Polito-Geographical Limits ==
This municipality is surround by the following municipalities of Valle del Cauca Department:

- North: Restrepo.
- South: Yumbo and Cali.
- East: Vijes
- West: Dagua

== Areas of the Municipality ==
The Corregimiento of Bitaco occupies the southernmost portion of the municipality. Within this area is the section called Chicoral which is home to the Hindú Tea Plantation and the Bitaco Forest Reserve. This area connects to the west with Dapa through a foggy, forested pass that crosses into the Cauca Valley.

== Image Gallery ==
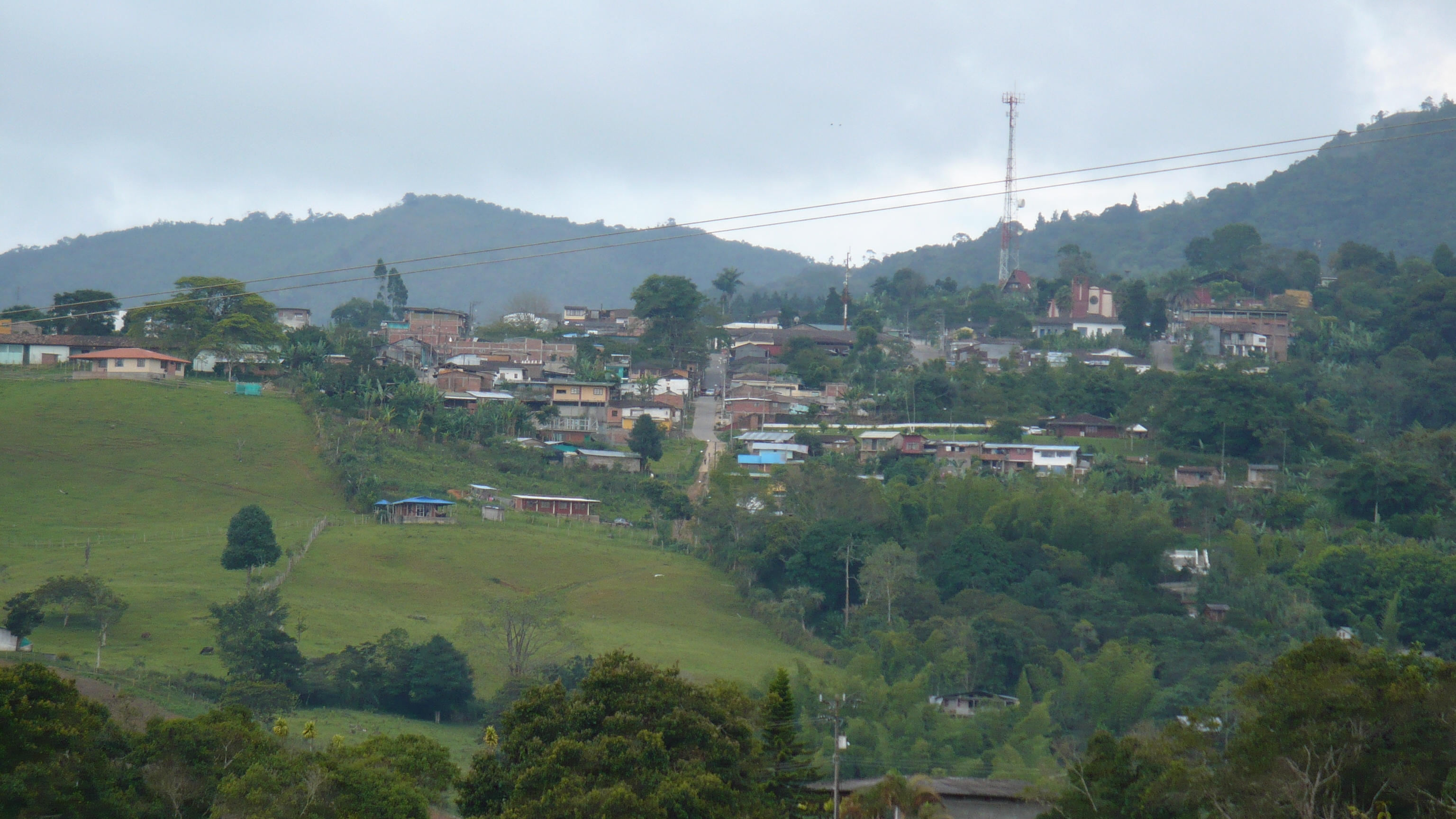

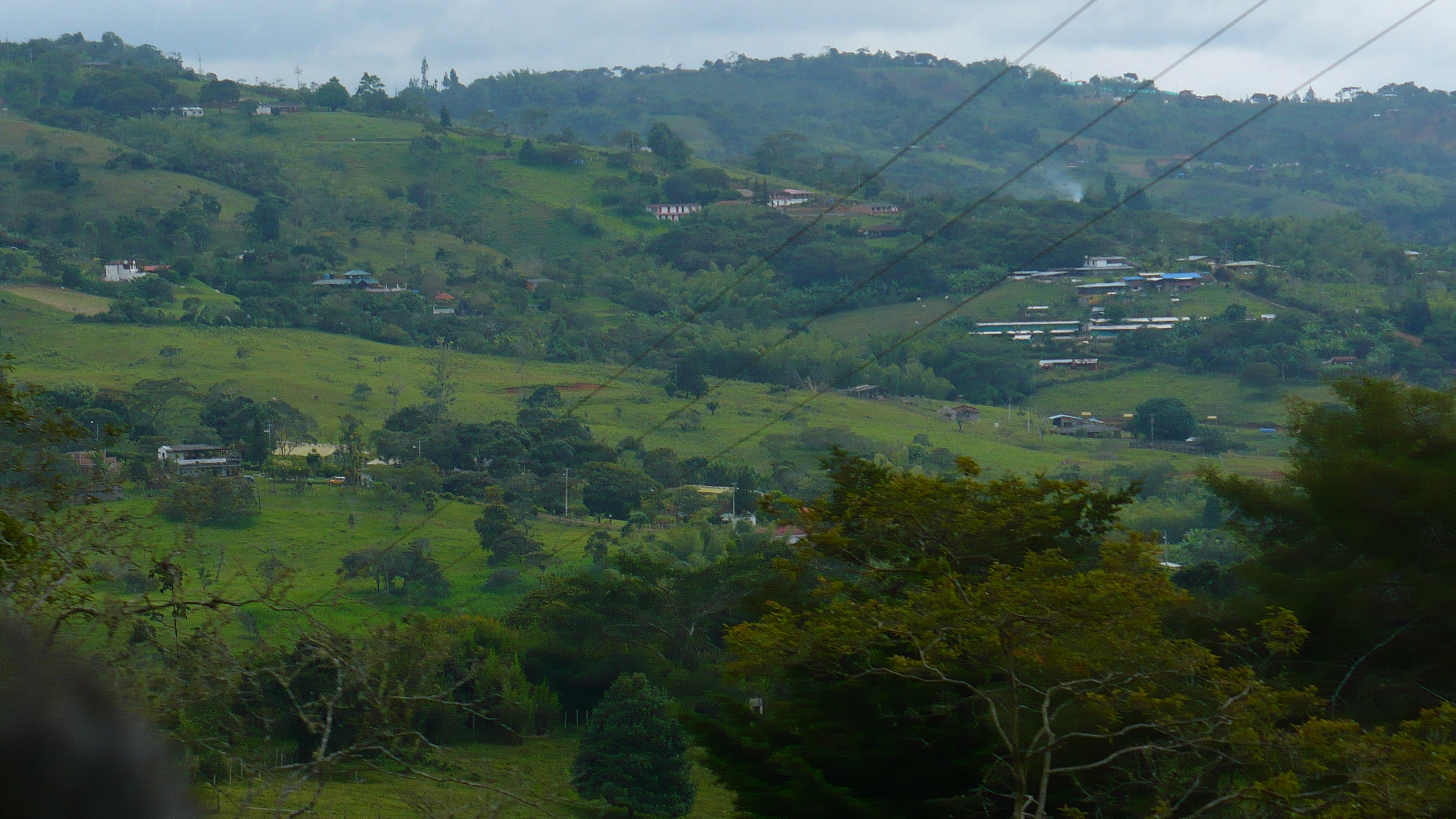
Fincas between the villages La Cumbre and Pavas

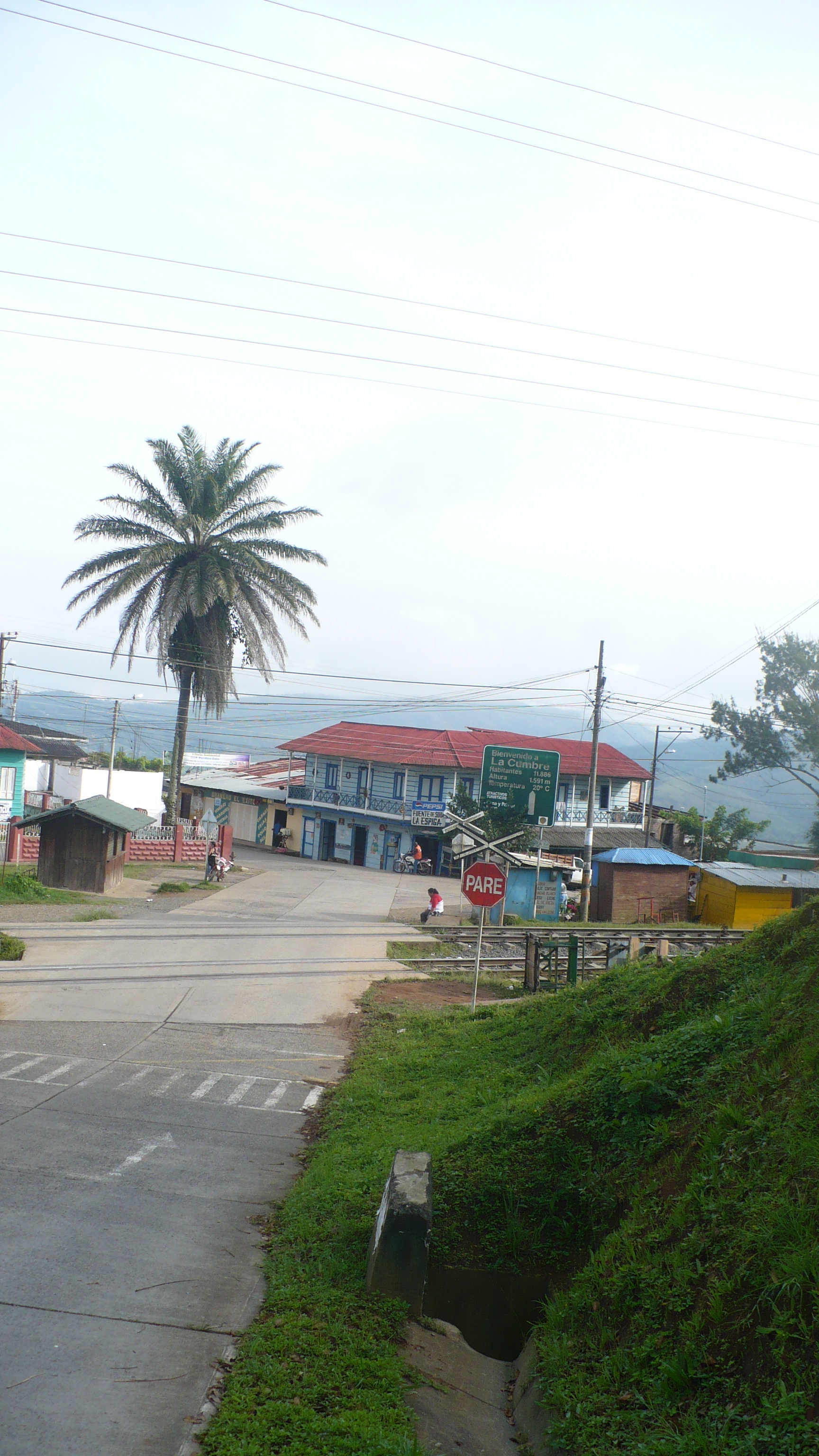
Entrance of La Cumbre, Cali, Colombia

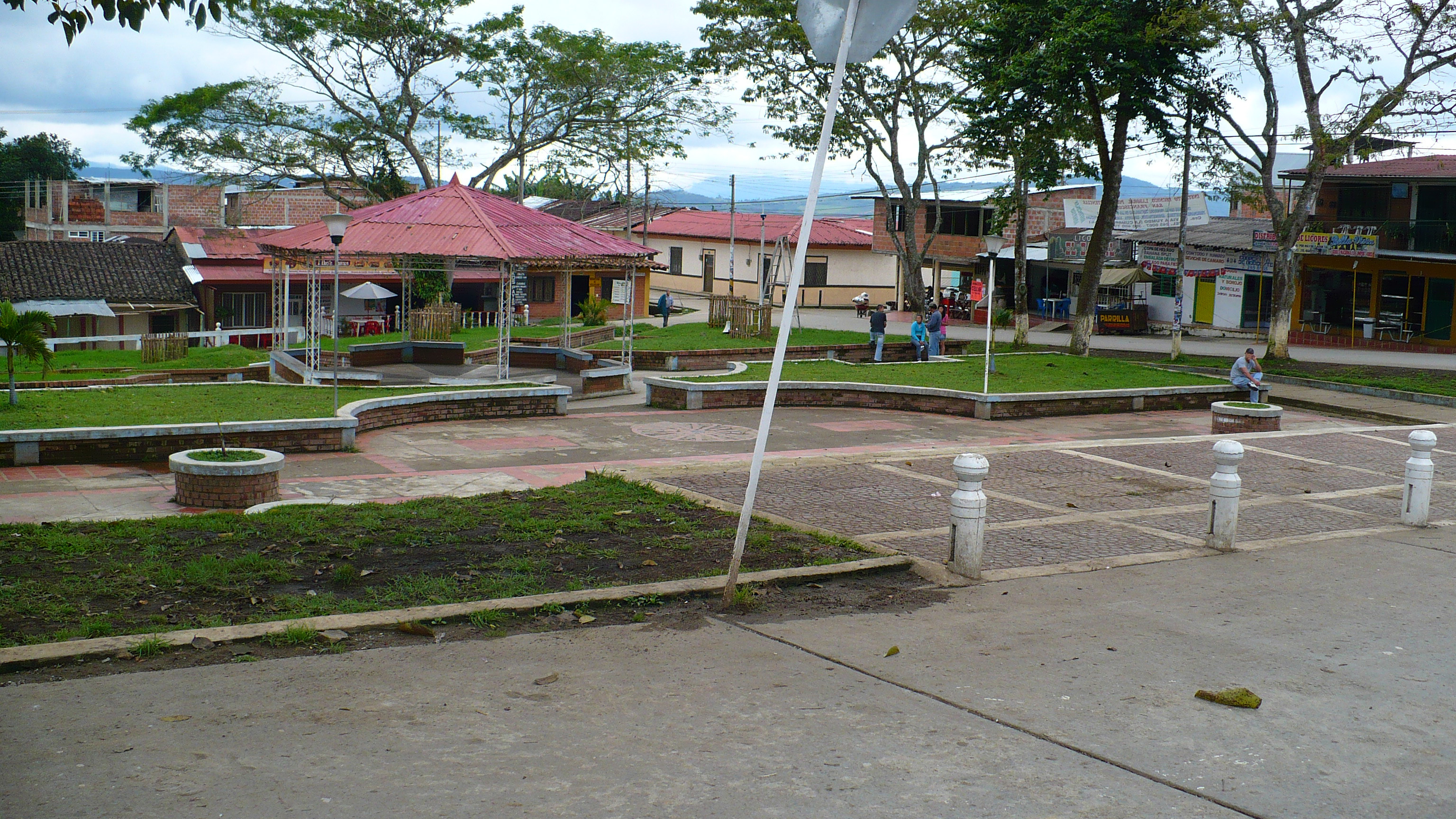
La Cumbre Park, Colombia

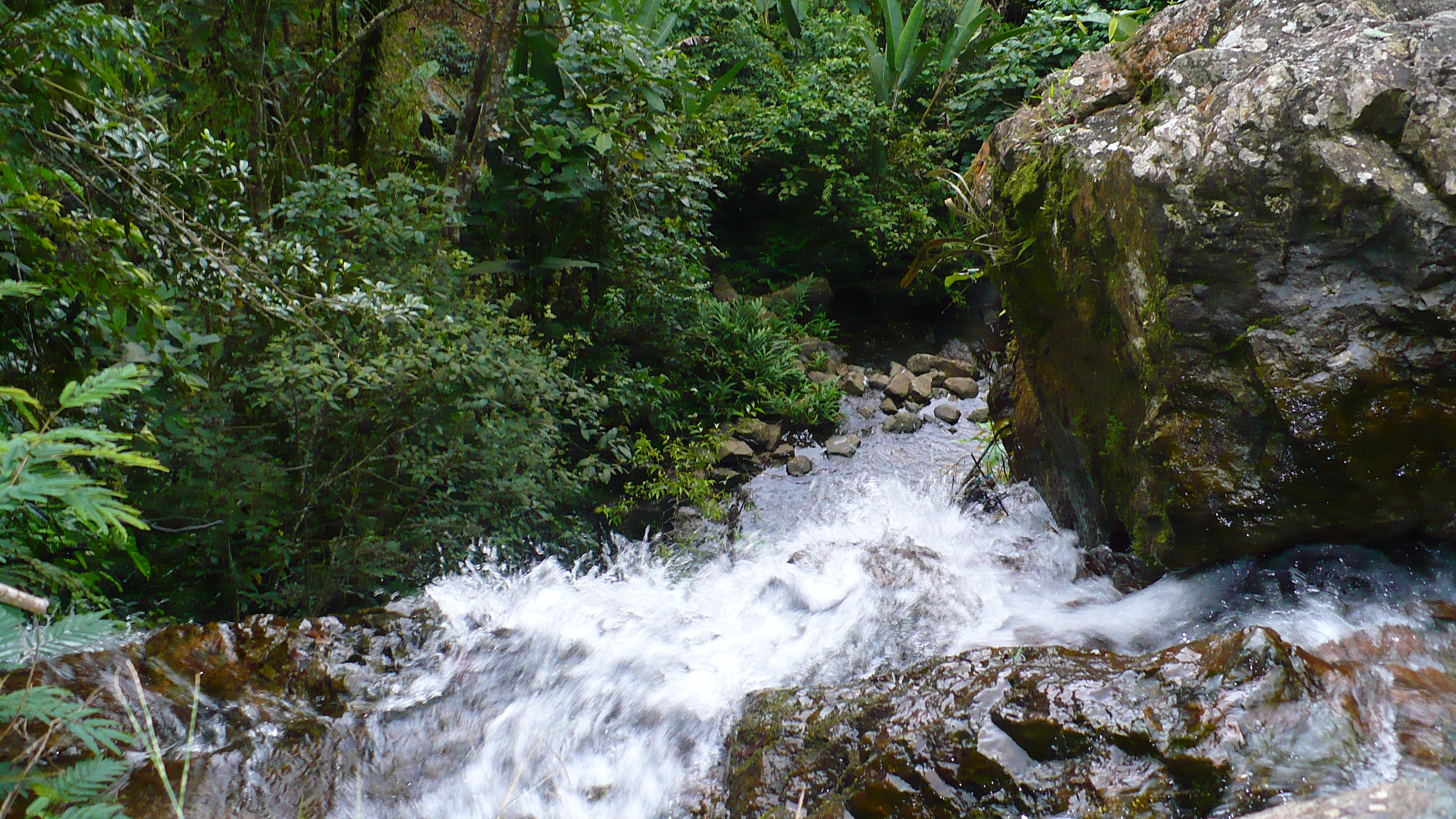
La Chorera Del Diablo,
To get here you can walk or you can pay to get there, the railroad service is very cheap. takes 15 minutes.

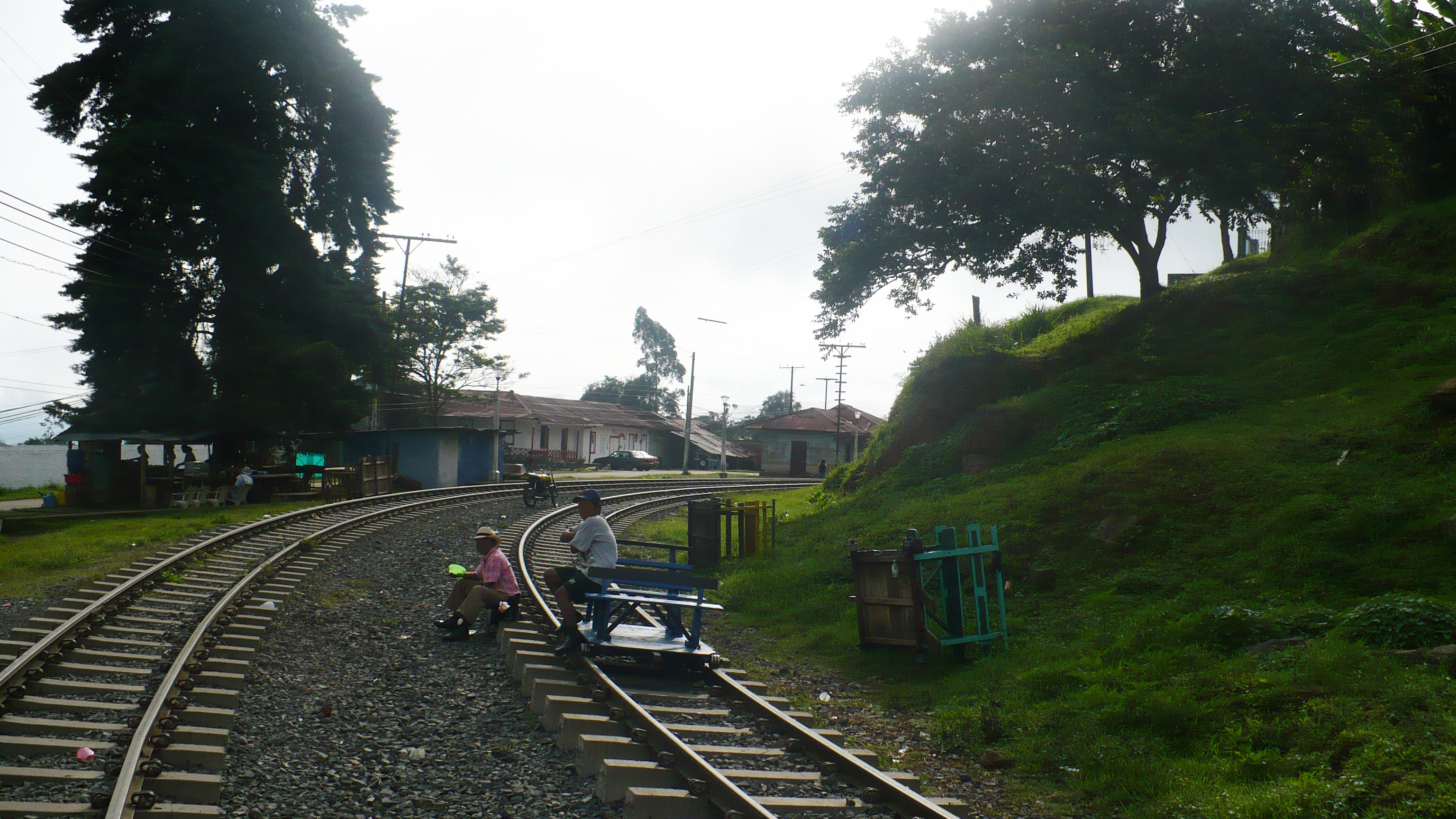
La Cumbre, Railroad Service.

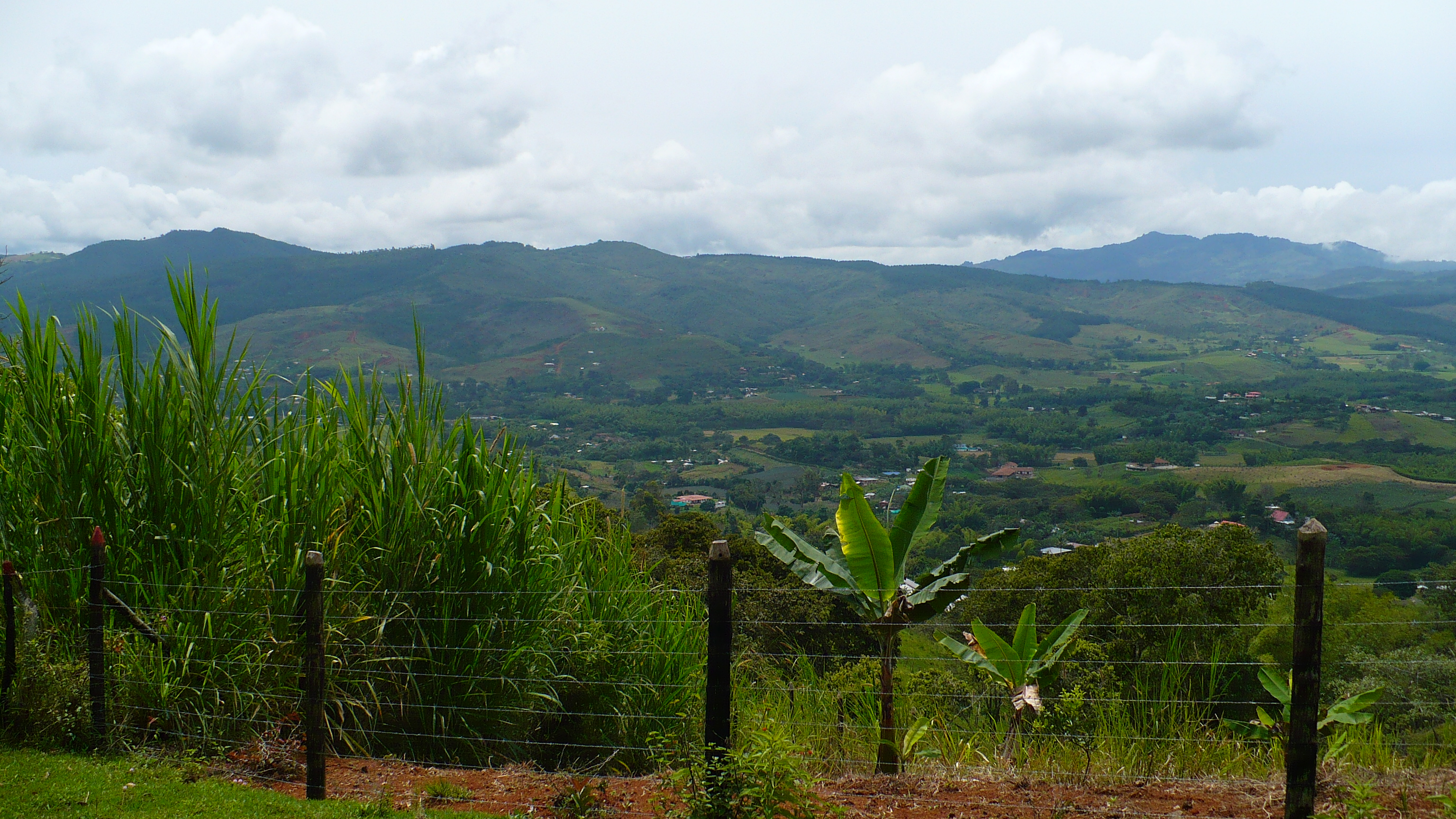
View from a Hill, La Cumbre, Pavas.

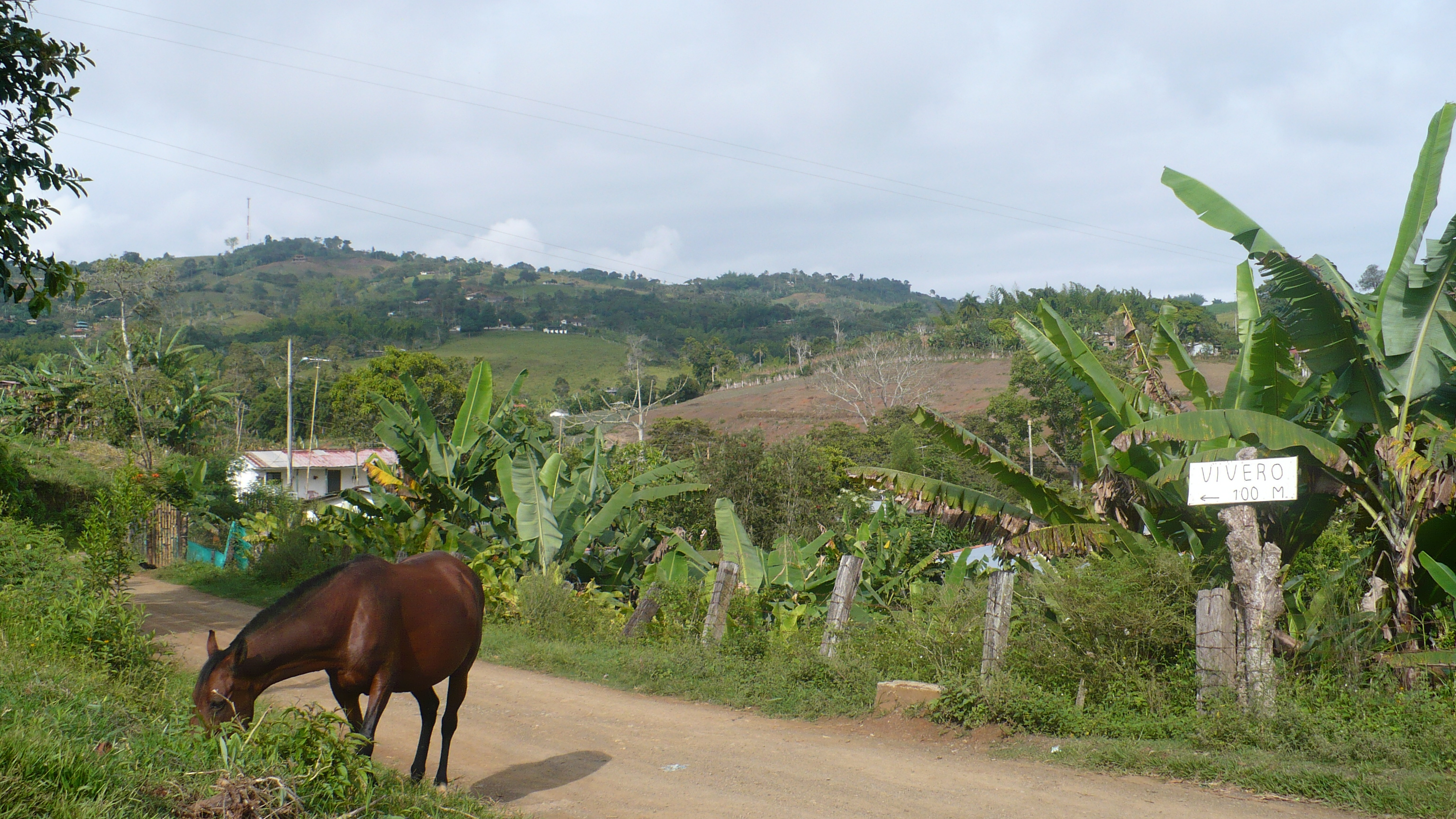
Horses walking freely.

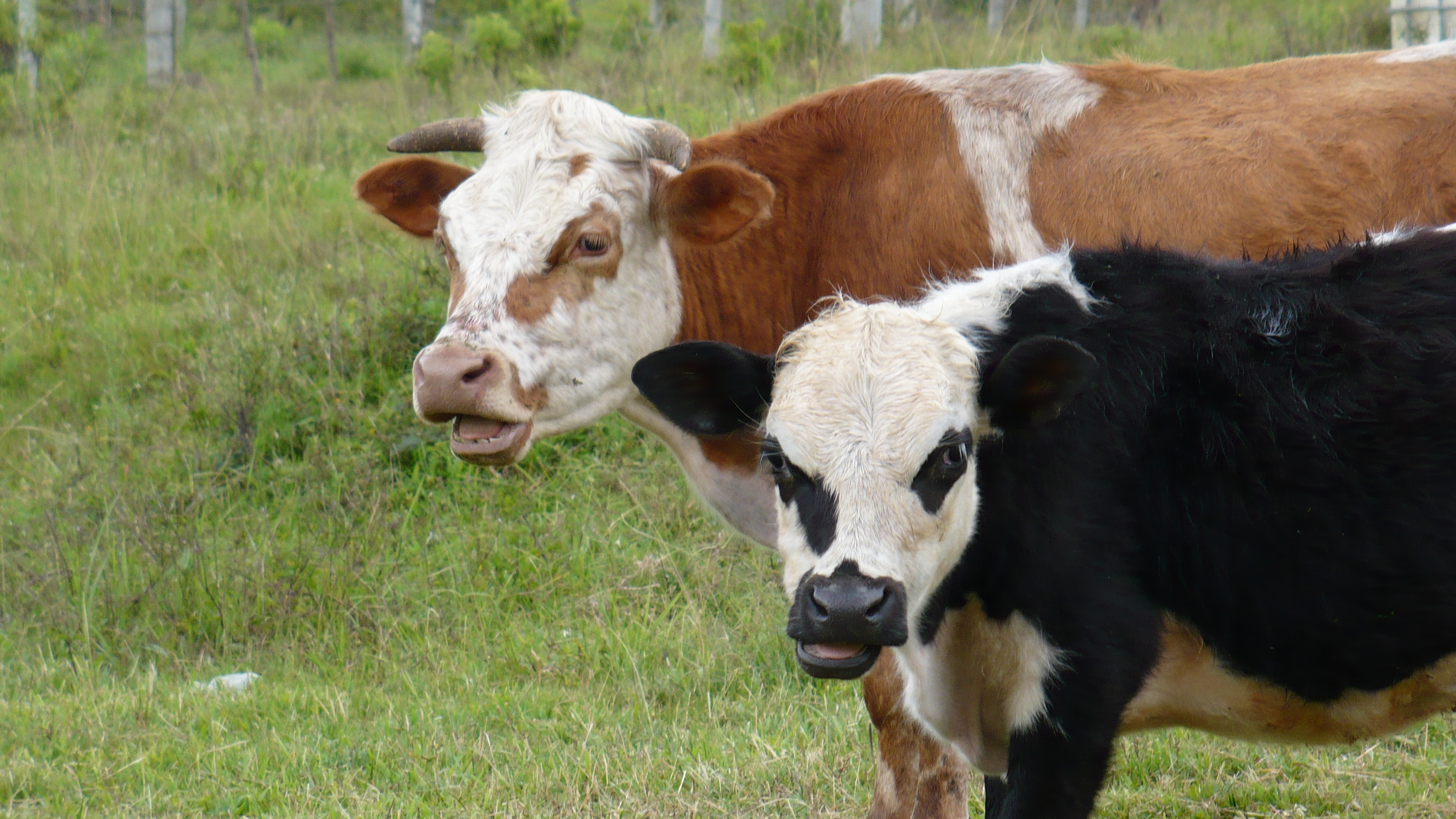
Cows at a Finca (Farm).

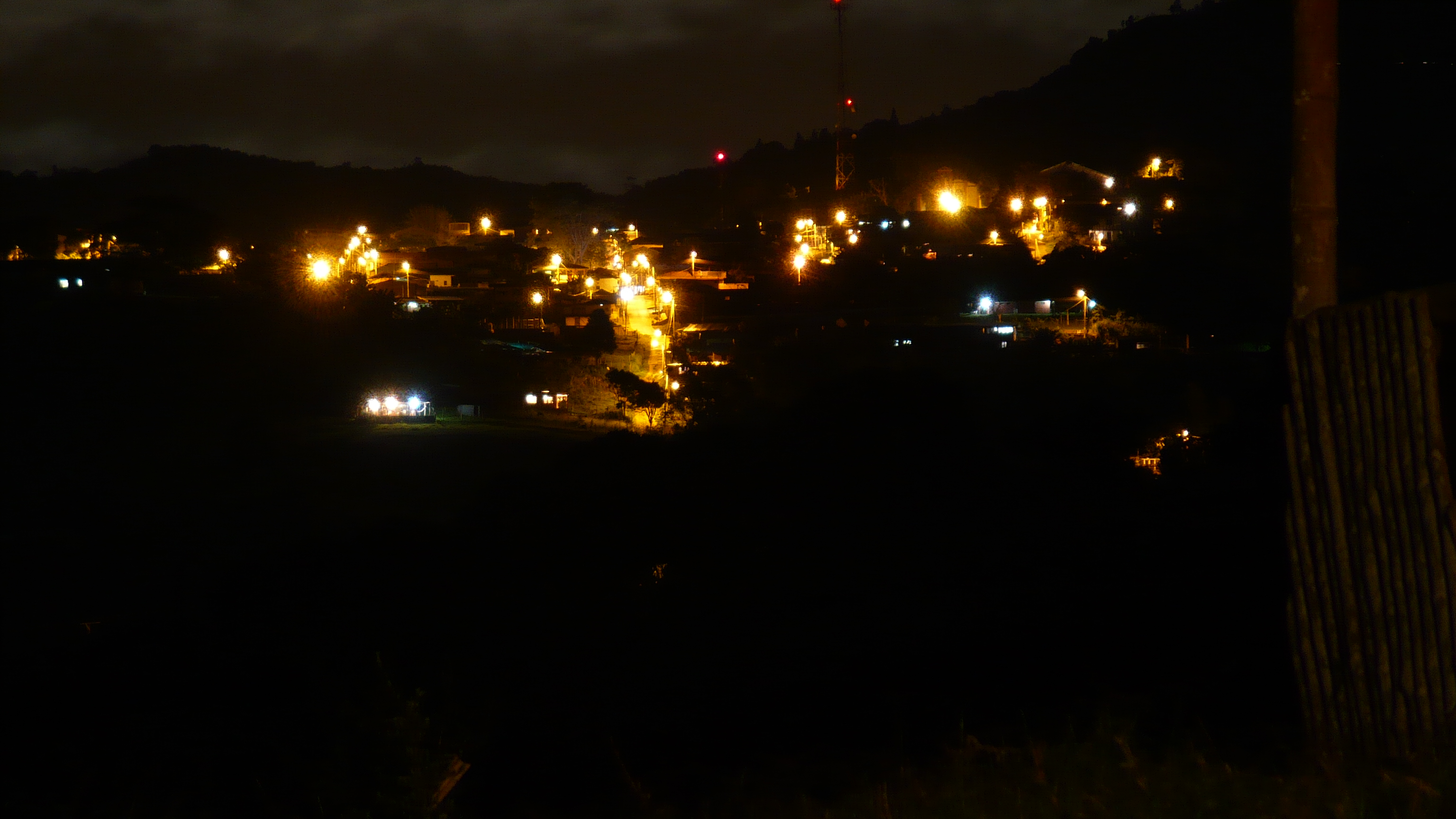
La Cumbre Night lights.

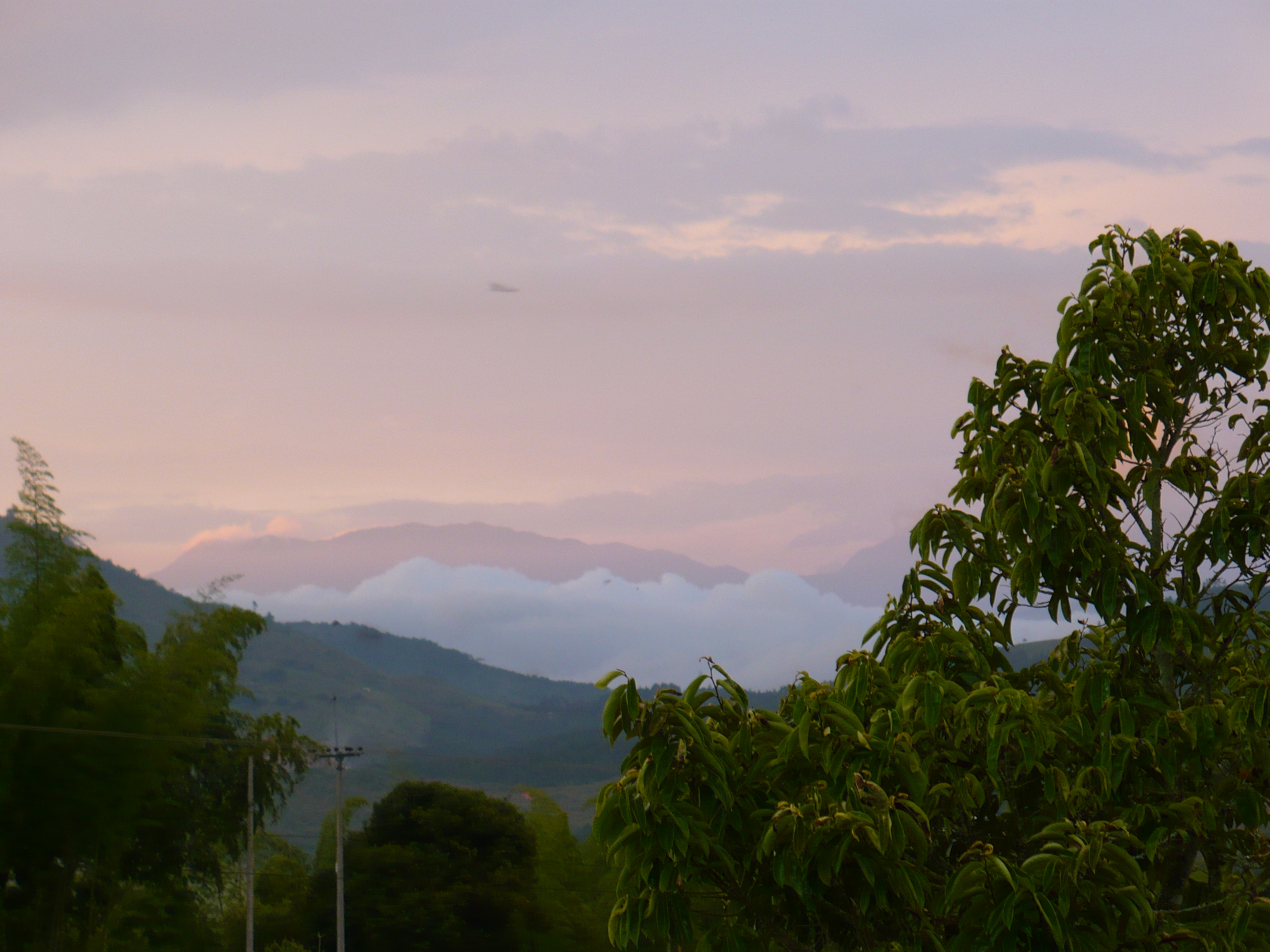
La Cumbre Hills, with Clouds.
