= Farallones de Cali =

Mountains in Colombia

- Location within Colombia

Highest point
- Elevation: 4,050 m (13,290 ft)
- Coordinates: 03°30′29″N 76°41′45″W

Geography
- Country: Colombia

PNN Farallones de Cali
- IUCN category II (national park)
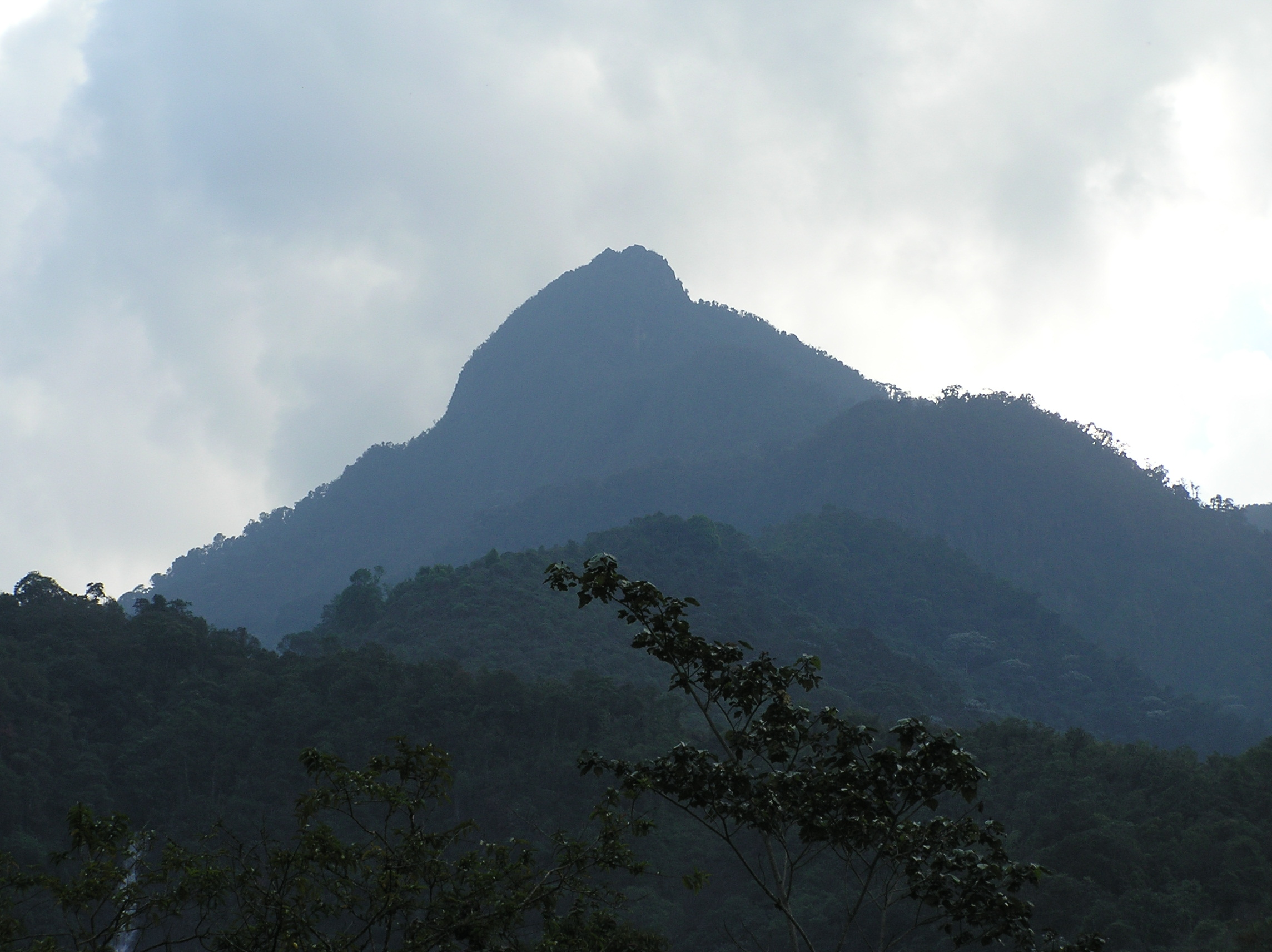
- Pico de Loro (Parrot Peak)
- Interactive map of PNN Farallones de Cali
- Nearest city: Cali, Colombia
- Area: 150,000 ha (580 sq mi)
- Established: 1968
- Governing body: SINAP

Farallones de Cali is a cluster of mountains in the West Andes of Colombia. It is located west of the city of Cali and gives rise to many of the rivers that provide water and electricity to Cali. The PNN Farallones de Cali encompasses 150,000 ha (580 sq mi) in the mountains as well as much of the Pacific slope and is an area of very high biodiversity. The average temperature ranges from 25 °C (77 °F) in the tropical foothills to 5 °C (41 °F) in the páramo. In this territory are located the district of Pichinde, Andes and Leonera, and two villages Penas Blancas and Lomas de la Cajita.

== Climate and topography ==
Average yearly rainfall is 6,000 mm (240 in) in the Pacific region and 2,500 mm (98 in) in the mountainous sector. Plants growing in the area have sufficient water throughout the year.

The topography of the park is characterized by the high, craggy peaks, the highest being 4,050 m (13,290 ft). These peaks are referred to as Los Farallones (which means cliffs), the namesake of the mountains and national park. The foothills on the eastern side meet the Cauca Valley and the city of Cali. On the west slope there are numerous river canyons that wind their way toward the Pacific Ocean.

The Farrallones are visible from the city of Cali.

=== Rivers ===
On the east slope the following rivers flow from the Farallones de Cali (from north to south): Cali, Pichindé, Cañaveralejo, Melendez, Lilí, Pance, and Jamundí. These river all flow into the Cauca River.

On the west slope there are many rivers flowing into the Pacific, but the main ones area the Dagua and Anchicayá. There is a hydroelectric dam on the Anchicayá River.

== National Park and biodiversity ==
The PNN Farallones de Cali is the largest national park in the Valle del Cauca Department and was formed in 1968. The area is popular for hiking and birdwatching. Access from Cali is by two main routes: by way of the Pance River at the southern end or at the northern end via Peñas Blancas or the Pichindé River. Access to the Anchicayá area is via the town of El Queremal. The lowest altitude of the park is 200 m (660 ft) in the Pacific lowlands.

=== Ecological zones ===
Due to extreme height of the mountains and the nearby Pacific Ocean, which largely determines the climate in western Colombia, there are various ecosystems in the park such as lowland jungle, mountain cloud forest and páramo.

Tropical Wet to Humid Forest is located between 200 m (660 ft) and 1,000 m (3,300 ft) above sea level. It is characterized by tall rain forest trees and a canopy reaching up to 40 m (130 ft). This area is on the western slope of the West Andes and is part of the Chocó Biogeographic Region. One of the key areas of biodiversity is centered around the upper Anchicayá River watershed.

Subtropical Cloud Forest is situated between 1,200 m (3,900 ft) and 2,000 m (6,600 ft). The cloud forest is usually blanketed in fog and inside the forest it is extremely mossy with many epiphytes. This ecosystem is also referred to as Subandean Forest - Bosque Subandino.

Montane Forest is located between 2,000 m (6,600 ft) and 3,500 m (11,500 ft). This high mountain forest is characterized by dense vegetation and a canopy that reaches up to 20 m (66 ft). As the elevation increases the tree height generally decreases. This ecosystem is also referred to as Andean Forest - Bosque Andino.

Páramo is situated above the treeline at altitudes over 3,500 m (11,500 ft). This ecosystem is geographically isolated from other Northern Andean páramos and is unique in the fact that it does not have the characteristic Espeletia plant of the Colombian páramo.

The ecosystems in the park face several threats including commercial logging, illegal mining, agriculture, tourism, forest fires, hunting and road construction.

=== Characteristic fauna ===
==== Birds ====
The Farallones de Cali is home to probably more than 300+ species of birds, including several endemic species such as the multicolored tanager (Chlorochrysa nitidissima), crested ant-tanager (Habia cristata) and chestnut wood-quail (Odontophorus hyperythrus). Andean cock-of-the-rock (Rupicola peruvianus) leks can be observed, the most famous being in the Peñas Blancas area of the Pichindé River valley. The avian diversity of the Anchicayá is world-renowned.

==== Mammals ====
Mammal species that are possible throughout the various habitats include: bats, squirrels, procyonids, anteaters, several felids, foxes, and marsupials. The spectacled bear (Tremarctos ornatus) has suitable habitat on the western slope of the mountains and is listed as a vulnerable species.

Five primates species exist within the park:

- White-headed capuchin - Mono manicero
- Red howler
- Mantled howler
- Gray-bellied night monkey (Aotus lemurinus): listed as vulnerable; referred to as Marteja in Colombia.
- Colombian spider monkey (Ateles fusciceps rufiventris): listed as vulnerable; referred to as Marimonda in Colombia.

==== Amphibians ====
- Bufo hypomelas ? - Sapo Mamboré
- Dendrobates lehmanni - Red-banded poison frog or Oophaga lehmanni

=== Characteristic vegetation ===
On the western slope, between 200 and 1,000 m (660 and 3,280 ft), there is a dry tropical forest with trees up to 40 m (130 ft) high. Beneath these trees grow tall grasses. There are different kinds of lianas and woody vines. On top of tree branches there are numerous epiphytes. Some endemical species are called cargadera, guabo sleeper, wild cacao and sirop. Among the palms of this forest there is taparín, barrigona or pambil and cumbi.

In the temperate zone, between 1,000 and 2,000 m (3,300 and 6,600 ft) the most representative tree species are oak, sapote bush, media cara, encenillo, azuceno, white yarumo and balsa.

The cold zone, between 2,400 and 3,600 m (7,900 and 11,800 ft), abounds in epiphytes. Above 3,600 m (11,800 ft) starts the moorlands, where frailejones are the characteristic plant. Among the Farallones endemisms there is a wild violet.

== Sites of interest ==
El Topacio Acampadero Pance very close to town. To spend the night in a tent needed a permit from the Regional Autonomous Corporation of the Valle del Cauca - CVC. The parking area is very limited. It has basic services, including a radio station in the ranger's house. From Topaz can visit two waterfalls.

Pico de Loro The trail starts at the Topaz. The upgrade can take several hours depending on the climber. At its peak, at 2832 meters above sea level is part of the city of Cali, Cauca river and its valley. No acampadero on top, on the rise there are several springs.

Punta Pance With 4020 meters is a journey that can take one or two days, recommended for those with more experience as walkers. At the top is a unique view of the region. On clear days you can see to the west and the Pacific Ocean port of Buenaventura (really clear days you can see the larger vessels) looks eastward Cali, the river Cauca and valley, and eventually the Cordillera Central with sticking the Nevado del Huila, in the south-west you can see the Cerro Naya, to the northwest is the Cerro Calima.

You can camp at a place known as "Balconies" which has a spring and a wide area to accommodate tents 5-10. Another possibility is to climb a little higher and camping in Punta Pance Lagoons.

Alto del Buey A 3480 m. His ascent is made from the input to Peñas Blancas and can take a whole day on a road in good condition. From the top is Part of Buenaventura and Cali. The camping area is limited allowing no more than 2 or 3 stores.

Gaps of Alto del Buey It's tortuous descent from the top of the Ox, but sometimes necessary in the absence of water on top. From above gaps are much larger than they actually are. Remember to always go with a guide.

Valley de los Osos Accessible from the mountain edge north of Punta Pance and towards the western side, there is a river and you see that landscape has been altered by man. It is located between the blade tip and the Massif Cajambres.

Macizo Cajambres To the west of Punta Pance, after passing the Valley of the Bears. It shows some erosion in its eastern slopes.

Peñas Blancas

== Gallery ==
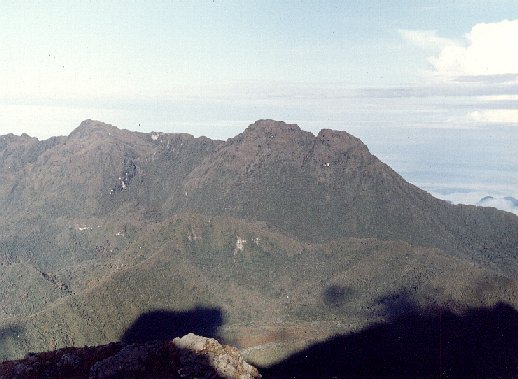
Macizo Cajambres & Valle de los Osos

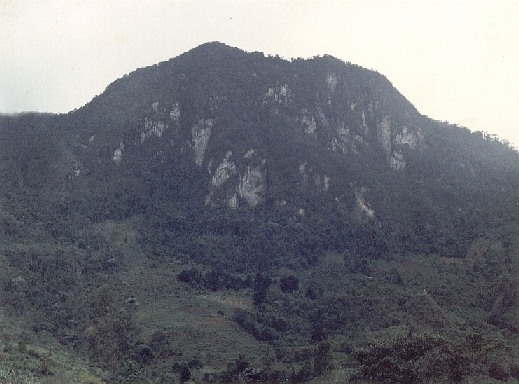
Peñas Blancas

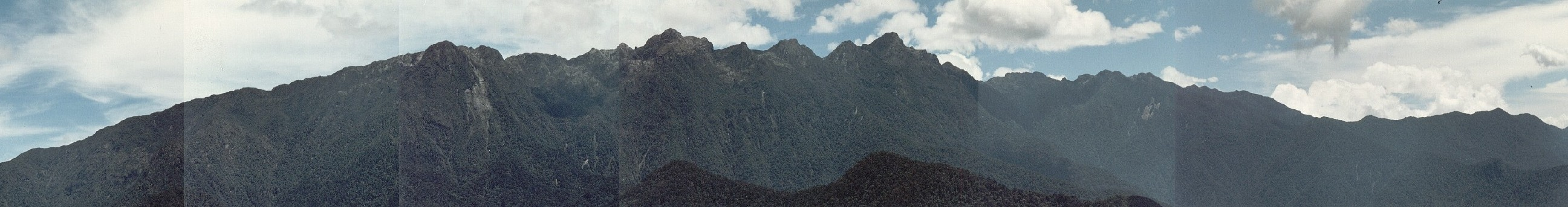
Panorama

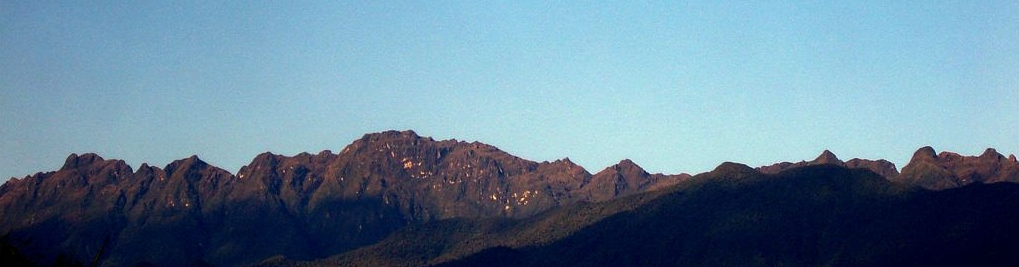
Panorama

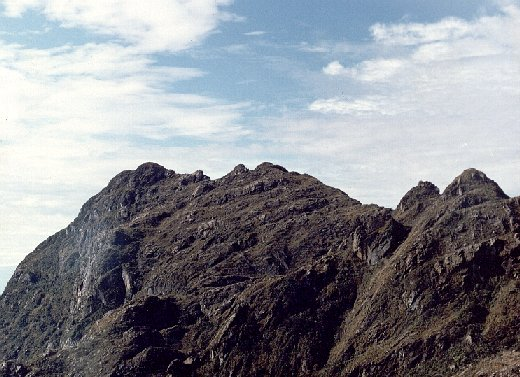
Punta Pance from the northeast

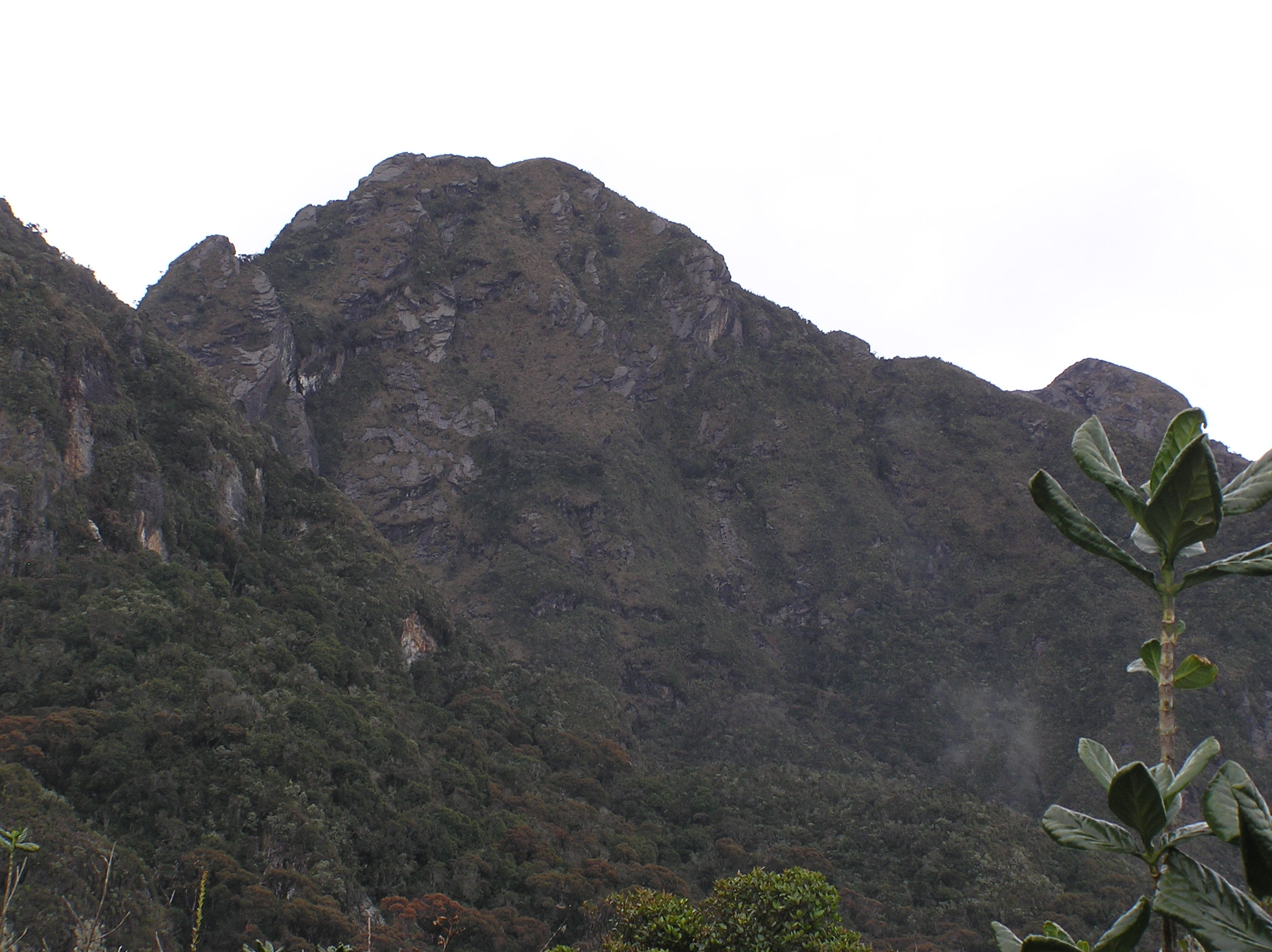
Punta Pance from the southeast

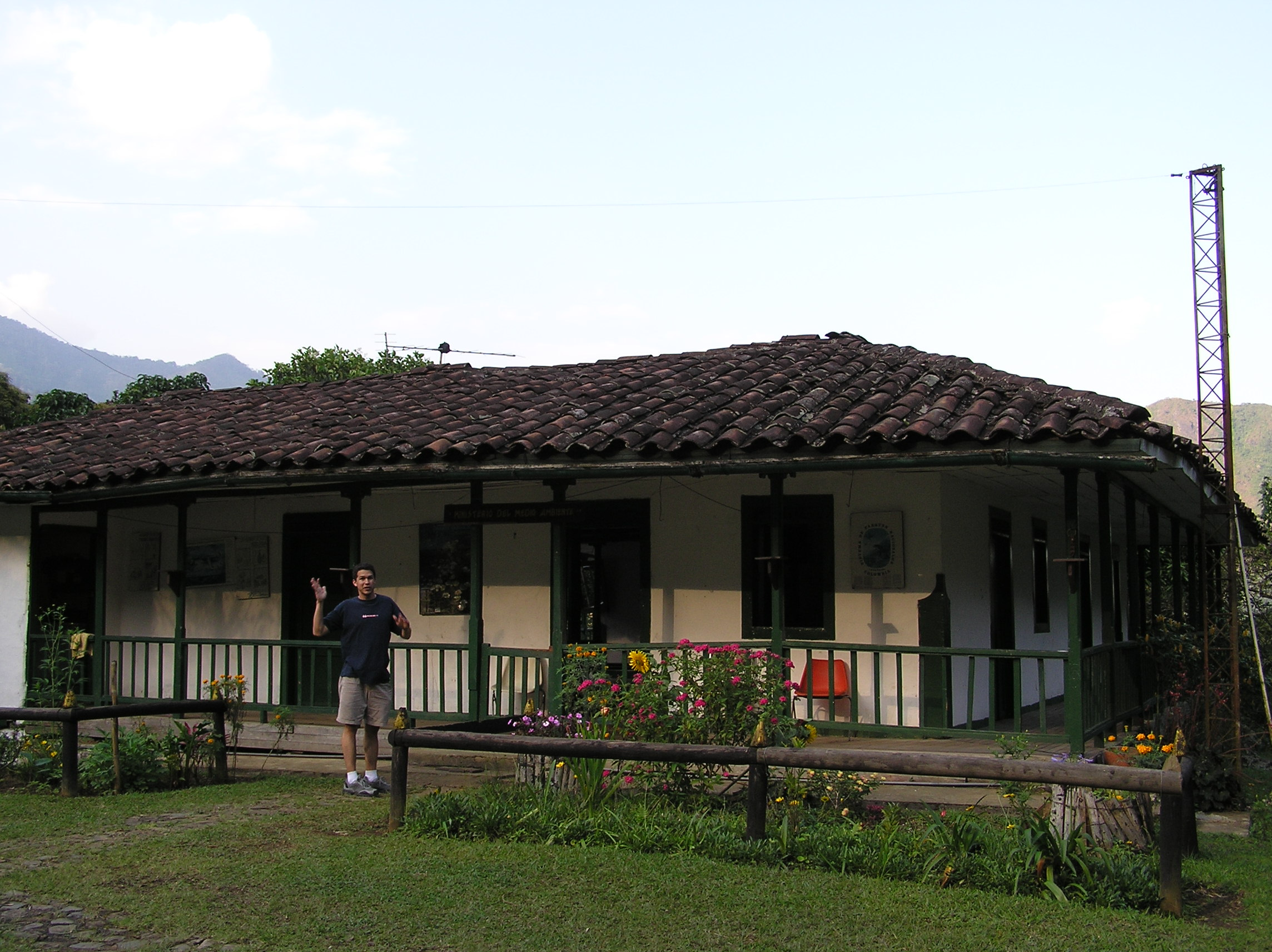
Ranger Home - El Topacio

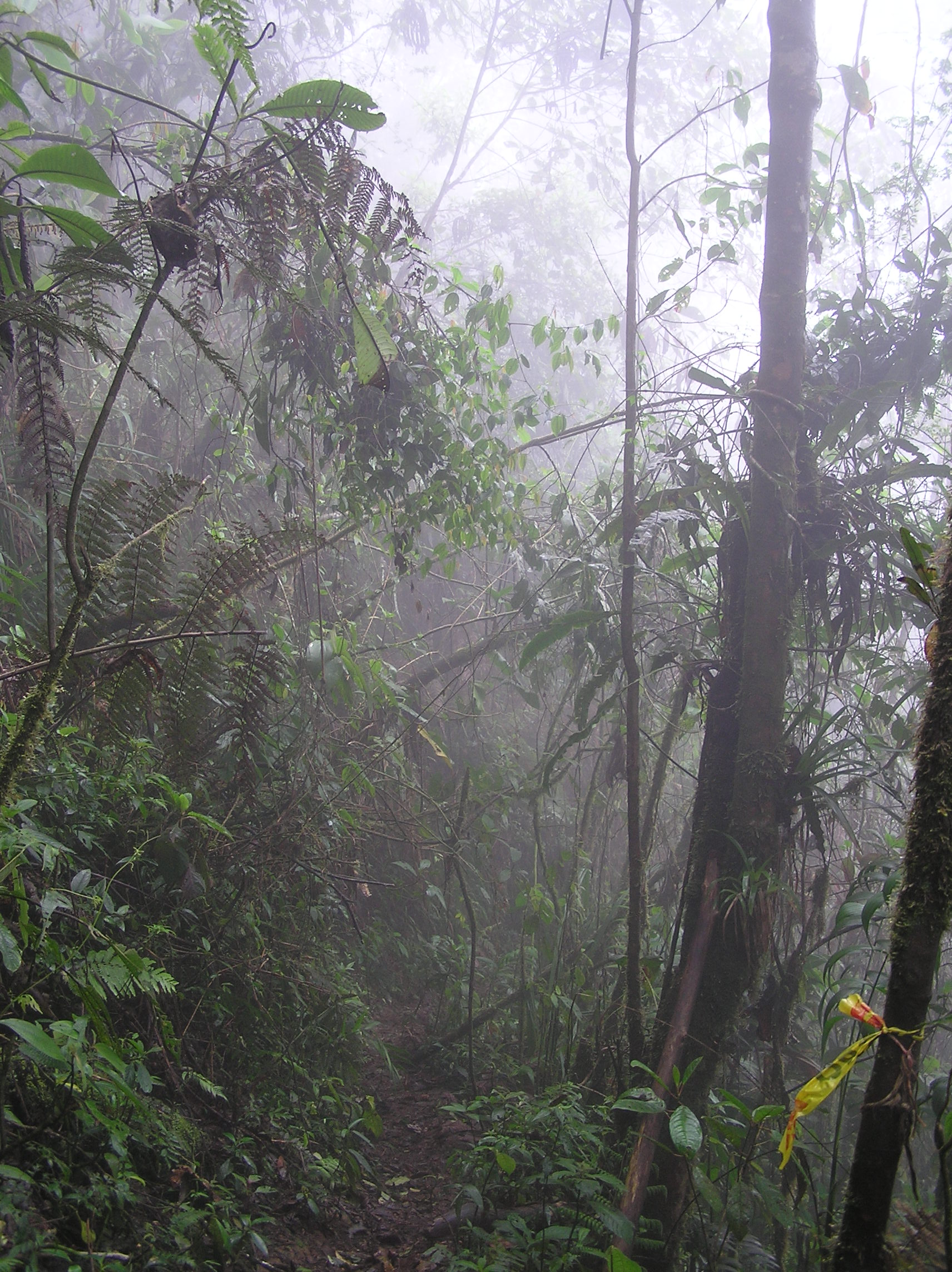
Rainforest

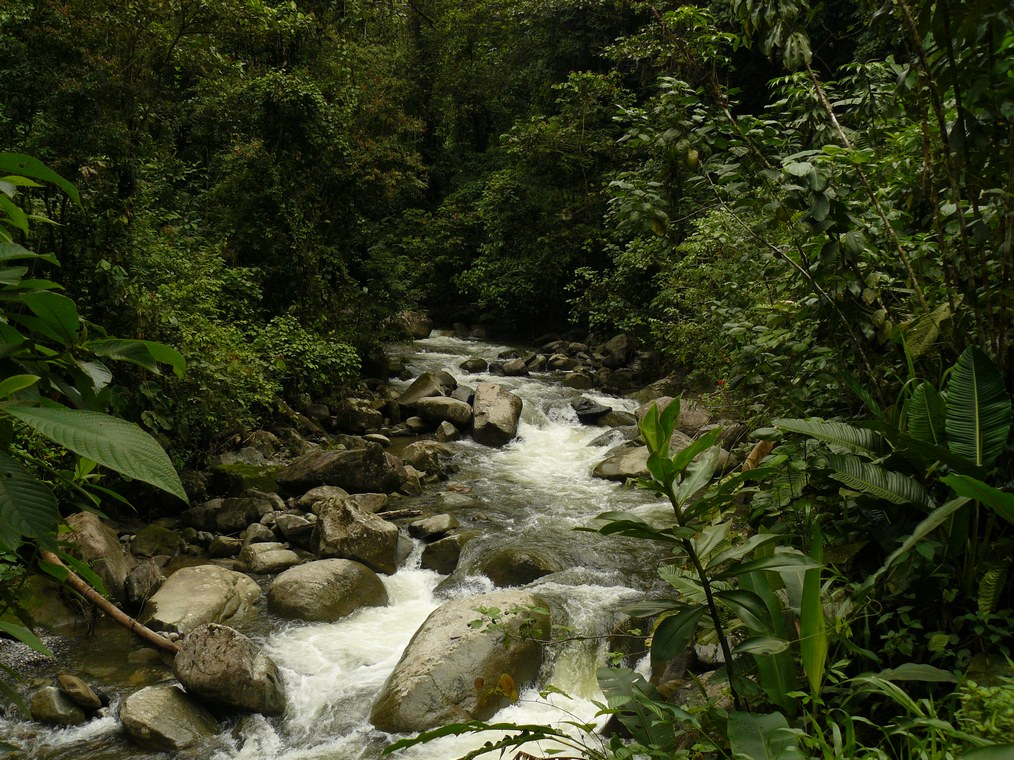
Anchicayá River

== See also ==
- List of national parks of Colombia
- Andean Region, Colombia
- Pacific Region, Colombia
- List of mountains in the Andes
- List of Ultras of South America
- Pico Loro
