= Pance =

Pance may refer to:

== Places ==
- Pance River, Colombia
- Pancé, France
- Pance, Ljubljana, Slovenia

== Acronyms ==
- Physician Assistant National Certifying Exam (PANCE)
