= El Queremal, Valle del Cauca =

El Queremal
- Populated center
- Location within Colombia
- Coordinates: 3°31′30.29″N 76°42′42.77″W
- Country: Colombia
- Department: Valle del Cauca
- Elevation: 1,450 m (4,760 ft)

El Queremal is a populated center of Colombia in the Dagua municipality, Valle del Cauca Department, Colombia. It is located about 47 km (29 mi) west of Cali and is at an elevation of 1,450 m (4,760 ft). The town is situated on the upper part of the Old Cali-Buenaventura Road and is about 99 km (62 mi) from Buenaventura, the main Colombian port on the Pacific. The town is accessible from Cali from several roads leading away from the main Cali-Buenaventura Road near the area of Kilometer 18, Valle del Cauca.

The climate is that of the subtropical Andean belt with a temperature range of 18 to 24 °C (64 to 75 °F) and an annual rainfall of about 2,000 mm (79 in). This climate is possible because of the convergence of moist air of the Pacific with the Western Andes. The San Juan River runs through the area, beginning in the Farallones de Cali and flowing into the Dagua River, which is part of the greater Anchicayá River drainage.

The name "El Queremal" comes from the local plant Cavendishia quereme.

== See also ==
- Andean Region, Colombia
