= Dapa =

DAPA is Deferred Action for Parents of Americans, a planned United States immigration policy announced in 2014.

DAPA or Dapa may refer to:

== Organisations ==
- Defense Acquisition Program Administration, an executive branch of the South Korean government

== Places ==
- Dapa, Valle del Cauca, a village in Colombia
- Dapa, Surigao del Norte, a municipality in the Philippines

== Science ==
- 4-hydroxy-tetrahydrodipicolinate synthase, an enzyme
- daPa (= DecaPascal)
