= Chicoral, Valle del Cauca =

Chicoral
- Vereda
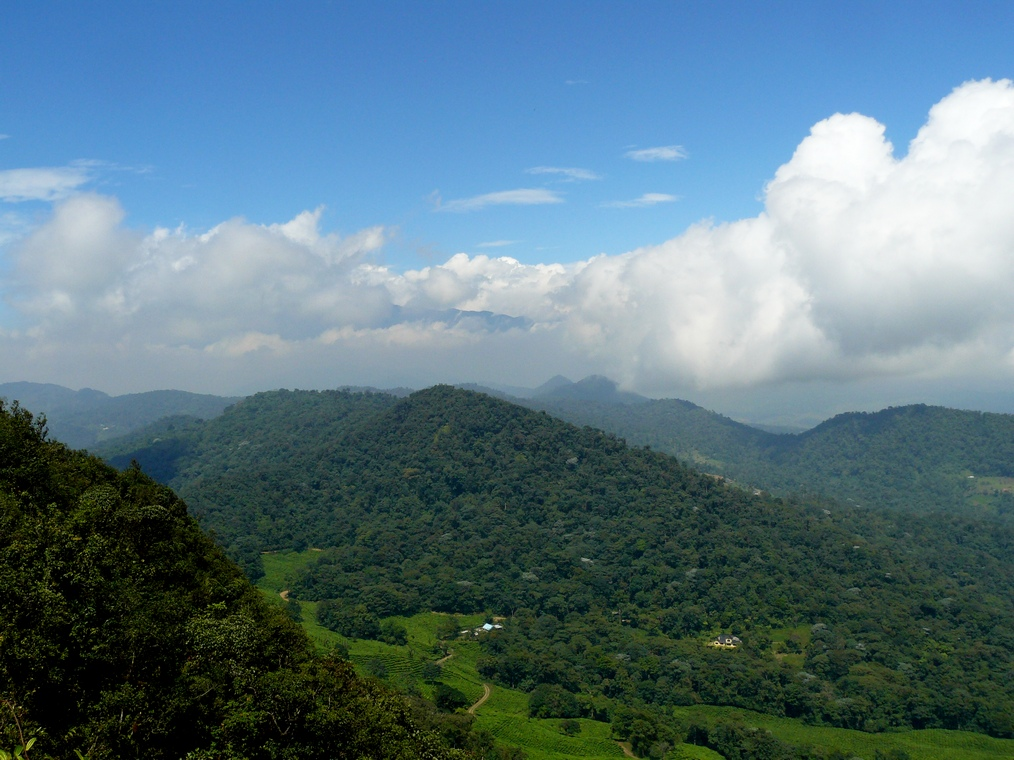
- Bitaco Forest Reserve and tea plantation, Chicoral

- Location within Colombia
- Coordinates: 3°34′29.33″N 76°34′53.59″W
- Country: Colombia
- Department: Valle del Cauca Department
- Elevation: 1,900 m (6,200 ft)

Chicoral is vereda located in the southernmost part of the township of Bitaco and within the municipality of La Cumbre in the Valle del Cauca Department of Colombia. It is home to the Hindú Tea Plantation, a major part of the Bitaco River Forest Reserve, and many small estates and farms. This region is only accessible by unpaved roads by way of La Cumbre from the north, the Cali-Buenaventura Road from the west and Dapa from the east through a forested pass at 2,100 m (6,900 ft).

The Bitaco River Forest Reserve was created in 1973 to protect a sizable portion of cloud forest and the headwaters of the Bitaco River, which flows northwest and drains into the Dagua River. The reserve is located on the west slope of the West Andes within the Chocó Biogeographic zone.

This is an area of high biodiversity with a high number of bird species, including the endemic and highly sought after multicolored tanager. Other important avian species include sickle-winged guan, scaled fruiteater, golden-winged manakin and golden-headed quetzal. In 2008 there was a sighting of cloud-forest pygmy owl, a rare and vulnerable species of the northern Andes.
