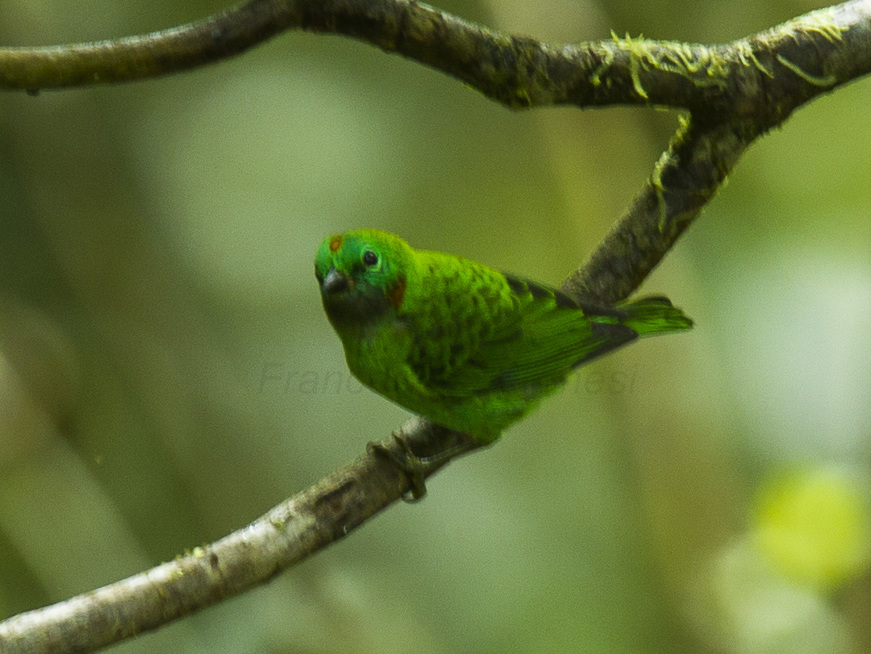

Conservation status
- Least Concern (IUCN 3.1)

Scientific classification
- Kingdom: Animalia
- Phylum: Chordata
- Class: Aves
- Order: Passeriformes
- Family: Thraupidae
- Genus: Chlorochrysa
- Species: C. calliparaea

Binomial name
- Chlorochrysa calliparaea (Tschudi, 1844)

= Orange-eared tanager =

Species of bird

The orange-eared tanager (Chlorochrysa calliparaea) is a species of bird in the family Thraupidae. It is found in Bolivia, Colombia, Ecuador, Peru, and Venezuela. Its natural habitat is subtropical or tropical moist montane forests.

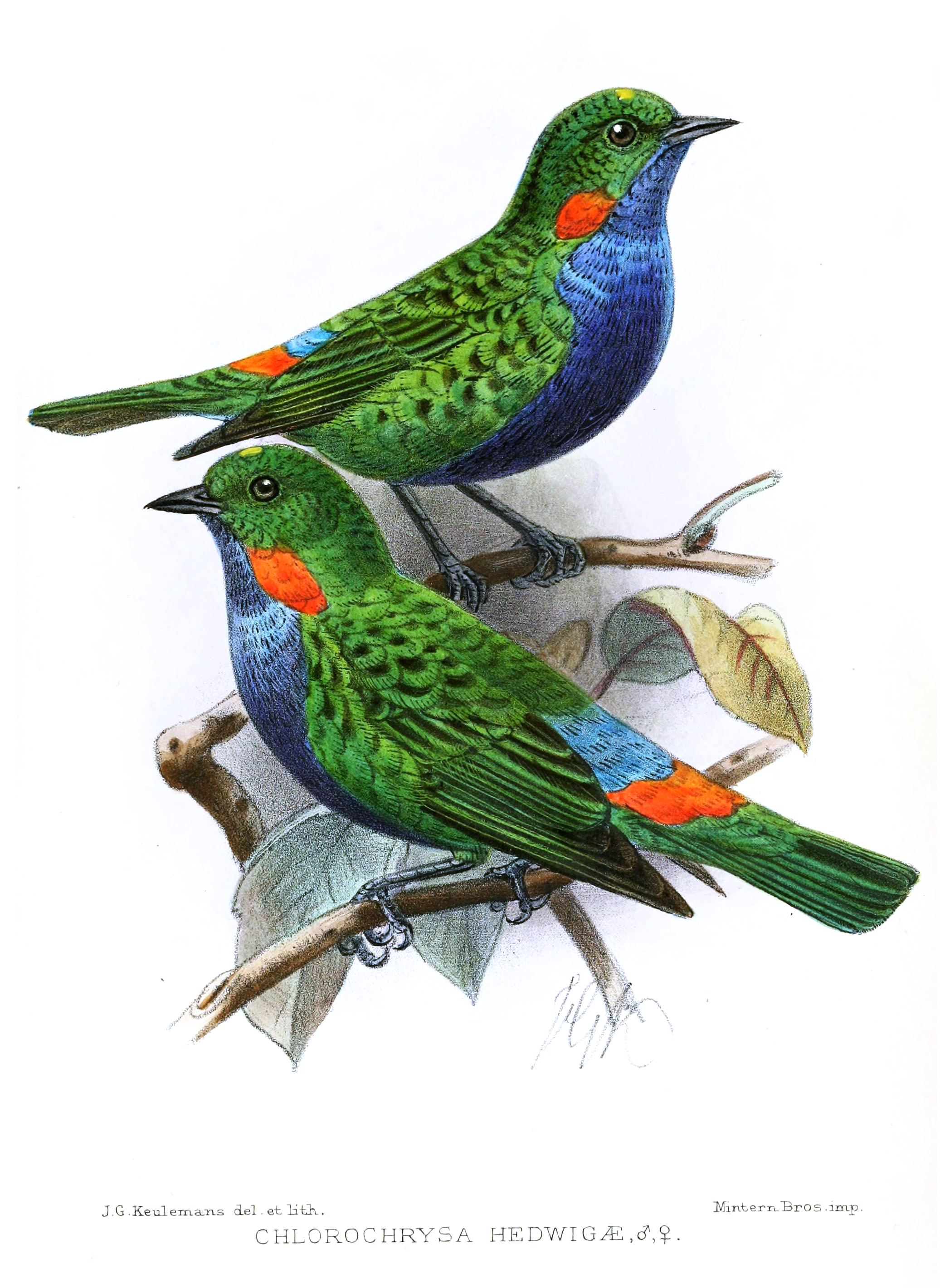
