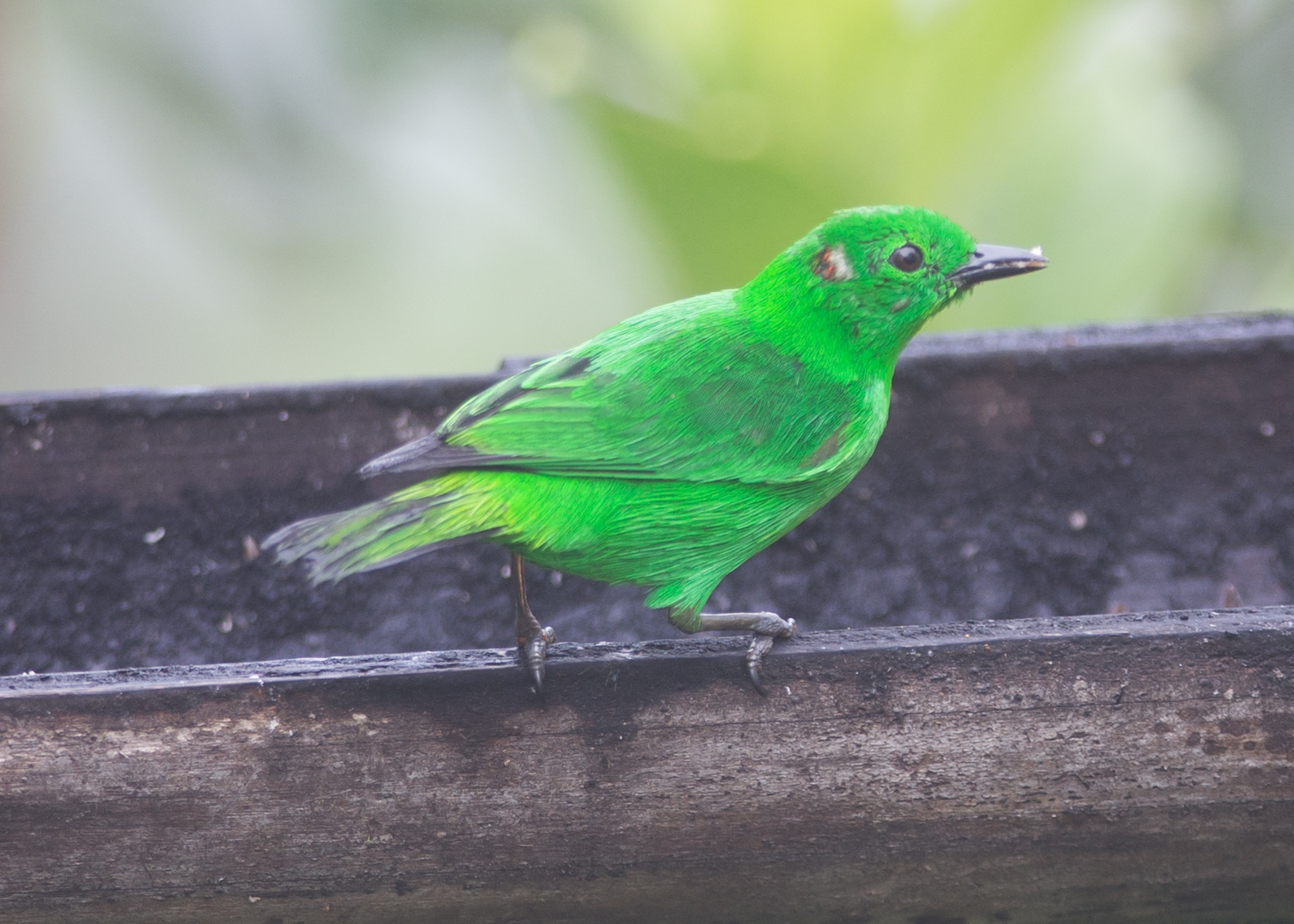

Conservation status
- Least Concern (IUCN 3.1)

Scientific classification
- Kingdom: Animalia
- Phylum: Chordata
- Class: Aves
- Order: Passeriformes
- Family: Thraupidae
- Genus: Chlorochrysa
- Species: C. phoenicotis

Binomial name
- Chlorochrysa phoenicotis (Bonaparte, 1851)

= Glistening-green tanager =

Species of bird

The glistening-green tanager (Chlorochrysa phoenicotis) is a species of bird in the family Thraupidae. It is found in Colombia and Ecuador.

Its natural habitat is subtropical or tropical moist montane forests.

Males are almost entirely bright glistening emerald green, with small gray patches behind and below the eye with another on the shoulders. Females are slightly duller than males.
