= Anchicayá River =

River in Colombia

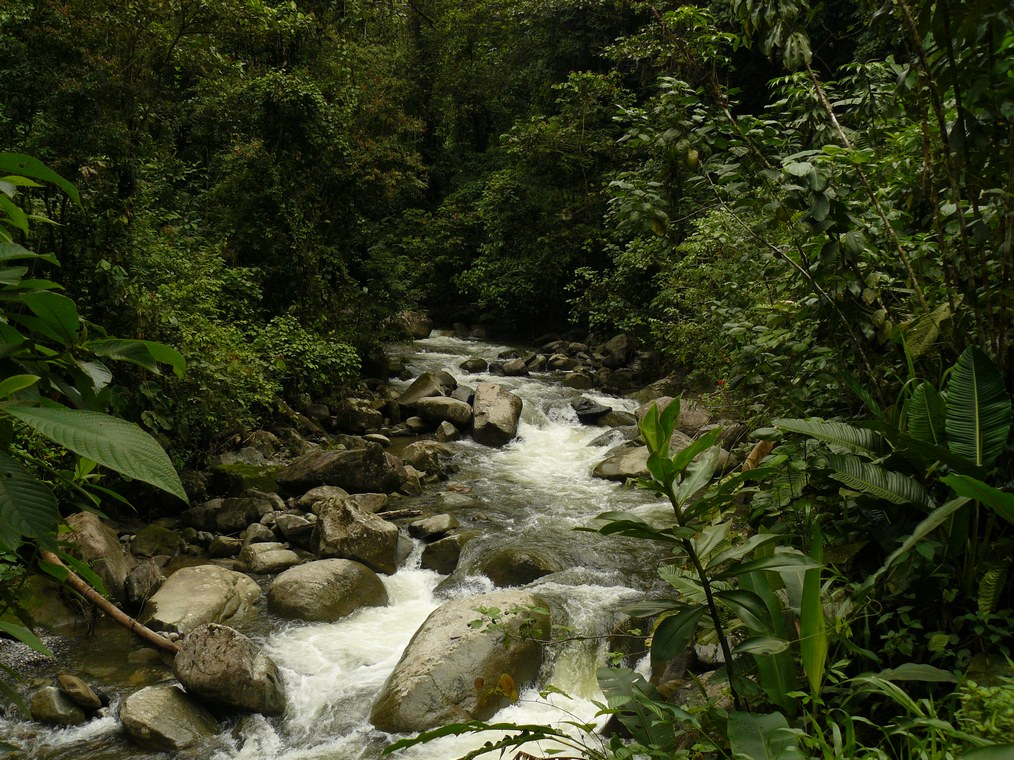
- The Anchicaya River above the confluence with the Dagua River

- Location of mouth

Location
- Country: Colombia

Physical characteristics
- Source
  - location: Farallones de Cali
- Mouth
  - location: Buenaventura Bay, Pacific Ocean
  - coordinates: 3°32′00″N 76°52′03″W
- Length: 100 km (62 mi)

The Anchicayá River in western Colombia has its headwaters in the Farallones de Cali and flows northwest into the Pacific Ocean at Buenaventura Bay. This watershed is known for its excellent biodiversity, especially with birds, amphibians and butterflies. It is famous for being one of the best birdwatching areas in the Neotropics. Steven Hilty studied the birds of this area in the 1970s while gathering data for the Guide to the Birds of Colombia, which was published in 1986. There is a hydroelectric dam on the upper part of the river near the town of El Danubio. For many years this area was unsafe because of the presence of armed groups such as the FARC, but within the past few years the Army has developed a large presence in the area.

Access is best from the town of El Queremal on the Old Cali-Buenaventura Road. It is roughly 45 kilometres (28 mi) from El Queremal to El Danubio, where the entrance to the area is located. The road is paved for the first 10 kilometres (6 mi). The trip takes normally two to three hours and is best with a 4WD vehicle. Access to the area is easy with public transport.

== See also ==
- List of rivers of Colombia
- Pacific Region, Colombia
