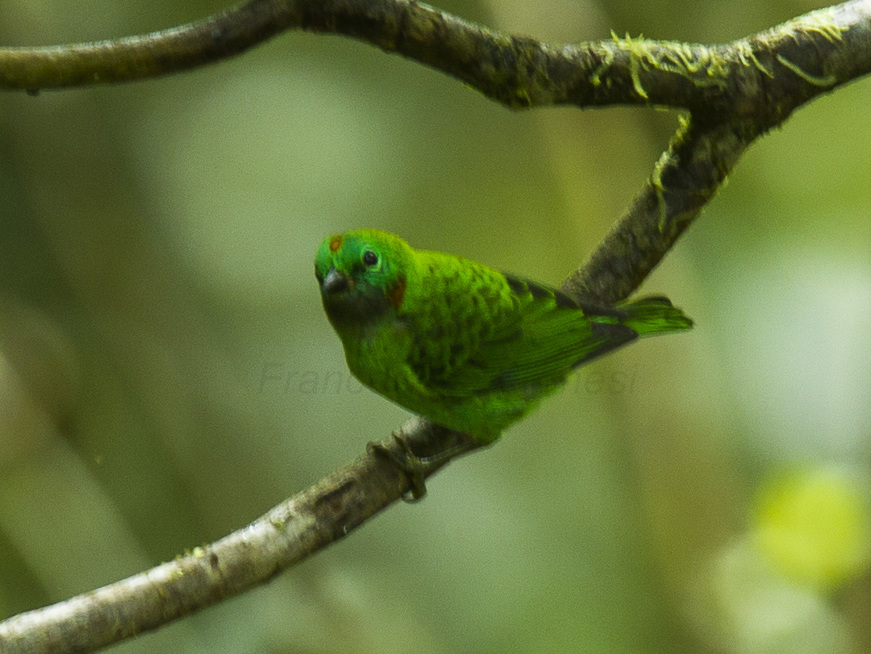
- Orange-eared tanager (Chlorochrysa calliparaea)

Scientific classification
- Kingdom: Animalia
- Phylum: Chordata
- Class: Aves
- Order: Passeriformes
- Family: Thraupidae
- Genus: Chlorochrysa; Bonaparte, 1851

Type species
- Callospiza calliparaea Tschudi, 1844

Species
- See text

= Chlorochrysa =

Genus of birds

Chlorochrysa is a genus of small colourful Neotropical birds in the tanager family Thraupidae.

== Taxonomy and species list ==
The genus Chlorochrysa was introduced in 1851 by the French naturalist Charles Lucien Bonaparte. In a subsequent publication he designated the type species as the orange-eared tanager. The name combines the Ancient Greek khlōros meaning "green" and khrusos meaning "gold". The genus contains three species.

Image	Scientific name	Common name	Distribution
	Chlorochrysa phoenicotis	Glistening-green tanager	Colombia and Ecuador.
	Chlorochrysa calliparaea	Orange-eared tanager	Bolivia, Colombia, Ecuador, Peru, and Venezuela
	Chlorochrysa nitidissima	Multicoloured tanager	Colombia
