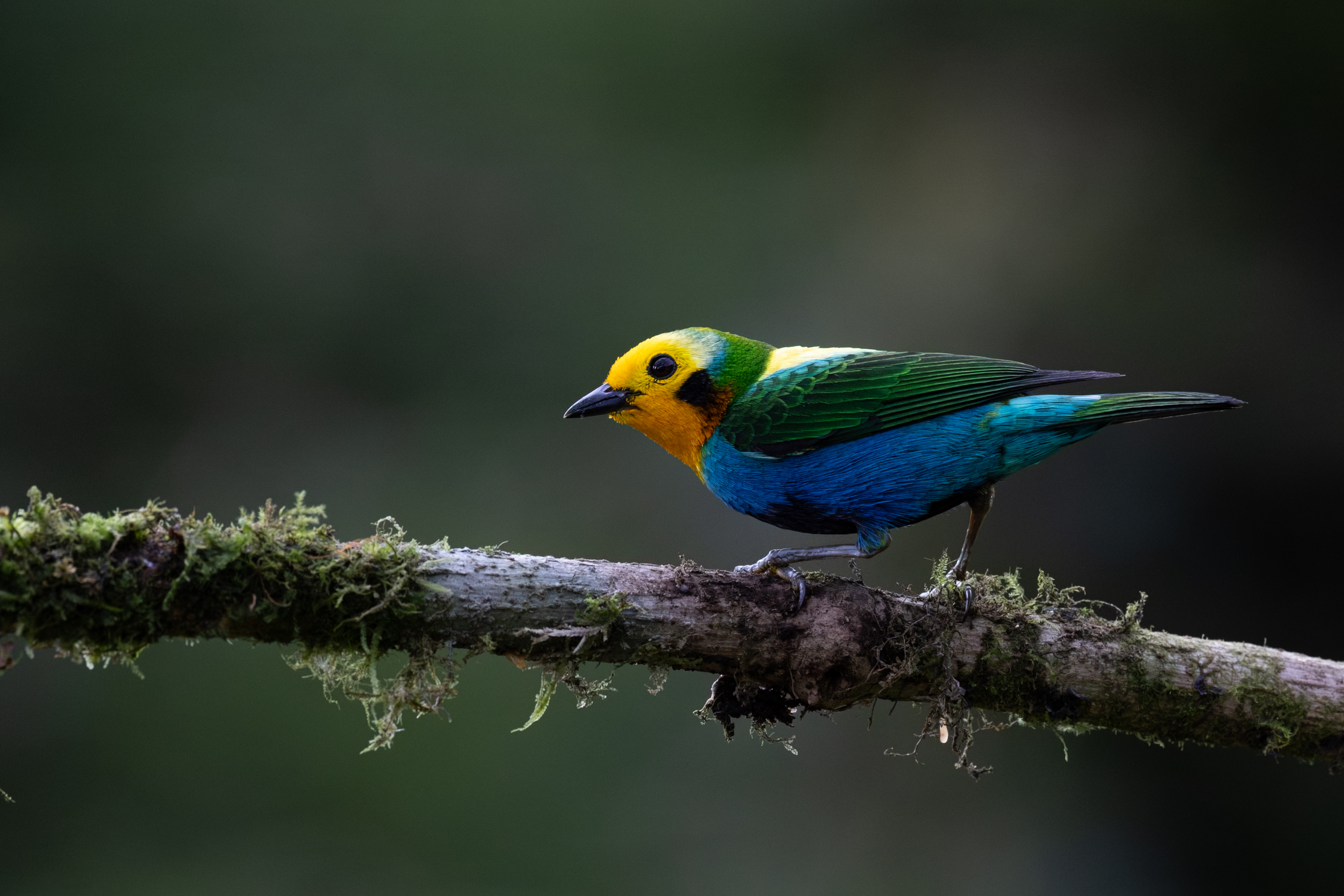

Conservation status
- Near Threatened (IUCN 3.1)

Scientific classification
- Kingdom: Animalia
- Phylum: Chordata
- Class: Aves
- Order: Passeriformes
- Family: Thraupidae
- Genus: Chlorochrysa
- Species: C. nitidissima

Binomial name
- Chlorochrysa nitidissima Sclater, PL, 1874

= Multicoloured tanager =

Species of bird

The multicoloured tanager (Chlorochrysa nitidissima) is a species of bird in the family Thraupidae. It is endemic to the mountains of Colombia, and is categorized as Near Threatened (NT) by the IUCN.

== Description ==
The multicolored tanager is a small-sized passerine bird approximately 12 cm (5 in.) long. Males have a yellow crown, face, mantle, and throat; chestnut and black ear coverts; bright green nape and wings; blue rump, breast, and belly; and a black patch in the center of the underparts. Females are duller and lack the yellow mantle and black patch on the underparts. Immature birds of both sexes resemble females, but are duller.

== Etymology ==
The genus name Chlorochrysa refers to the bright green and yellow regions of the plumage. The species name nitidissima means "very bright", referring to the beauty of its plumage.

== Distribution and habitat ==
The multicolored tanager is endemic to the interior of wet montane forests of the Occidental and Central Cordillera of Colombia. It is found mainly from 1300 to 2200 meters above sea level; however, some records indicate it can be found as low as 900 meters, especially in the Department of Cauca. It has been recorded in the Departments of Cauca, Valle del Cauca, Choco, Quindío, Risaralda, Caldas, and Antioquia. It seems to prefer mature forests, although it has also been recorded in mature secondary forests and forest edges. Most of the recent records of the species come from the Valle del Cauca Department, where it resides year-round and remains fairly common even in small forest fragments.

== Food and feeding ==
This species is most often found as part of mixed-species flocks in the upper canopy of the forest. It usually searches for insects on the underside of leaves of outer limbs while clinging to leaves with its feet. It has also been reported eating ripe fruit, mainly from the genera Cordia, Miconia, Palicourea, and Ficus.

== Breeding ==
Information on breeding behavior and seasonality of the species mostly consists of individual and isolated records. Hilty and Brown reported a stub-tailed juvenile with two adults on 1 November, and a grown juvenile on 8 January. Both records came from the West Andes above Cali, Valle del Cauca (Occidental Cordillera). In August 1990, two adults were recorded feeding chicks in the same area, and in January 2000, a juvenile and two adults were observed eating fruit near the Bitaco River Forest Reserve in Chicoral, Valle del Cauca. One juvenile and one adult male were recorded on 11 February 2001 at Kilometer 18 on the Cali-Buenaventura highway. Records from the Central Cordillera include sightings of two juveniles and adults in March 2000 in La Magdalena, above Buga. During 1996, juveniles of the species were observed at the Santuario de Fauna y Flora Otún-Quimbaya, and Parque Regional Ucumarí, in the department of Risaralda. Three specimens in reproductive condition and one immature bird were collected in May and June in the Central Cordillera (specimens located at USNM). Collectively, these data suggest that adults breed from November to August, a common pattern among tropical resident birds.

== Conservation status ==
The IUCN has listed this species as Near Threatened, mainly because of its small range, and also because it is only known from a small number of locations. The multicolored tanager used to be fairly common, but population declines have been recorded throughout its range owing to ongoing habitat destruction, and nowadays it is only encountered very infrequently, primarily in remnant forest fragments. Habitat loss and fragmentation are major threats to the species: approximately 81% of its habitat has been lost to date. Renjifo suggested that this species is very sensitive to habitat fragmentation as it is found in 16% of point counts from interior, continuous forest, but in only 3% of point counts in forest fragments. The expanding network of roads across the species' range has led to increases in logging, mining, agriculture, and human settlement. Although the species occurs in protected areas with large tracts of suitable habitat like Farallones de Cali, Munchique, and Los Nevados National Parks, most recent records come from unprotected and private forests in the Valle del Cauca Department. Proposed conservation actions include increasing the number and size of protected areas within the species' range, as well as enforcing conservation measures in previously protected areas, and providing non-damaging alternatives to settlers.

Most recent records for the multicolored tanager come from the Valle del Cauca department, in the Western Andes right outside Cali. Since the construction of the Cali-Buenaventura road during the first decade of the twentieth century, this area has been heavily transformed, mainly for agriculture and cattle ranching, and the remaining forest patches range from 10 to 400 ha. Two Important Bird Areas (Chicoral and San Antonio) have been declared in the area within the last two decades, which has led to increasing awareness in the local community to bird conservation. These areas are connected to Los Farallones National Park (also an Important Bird Area), which has a total area of around 150,000 ha. Seven Civil Society Reserves and one Regional Reserve are also part of the habitat protected for this and other threatened species in the locality. Bosque de Yotoco Reserve is another Important Bird Area in the Valle del Cauca department where this species occurs. In addition to protected areas, several NGOs work in various aspects of conservation in the zone, especially environmental education with the local communities.
