= Dapa, Valle del Cauca =

Dapa
- Corregimiento
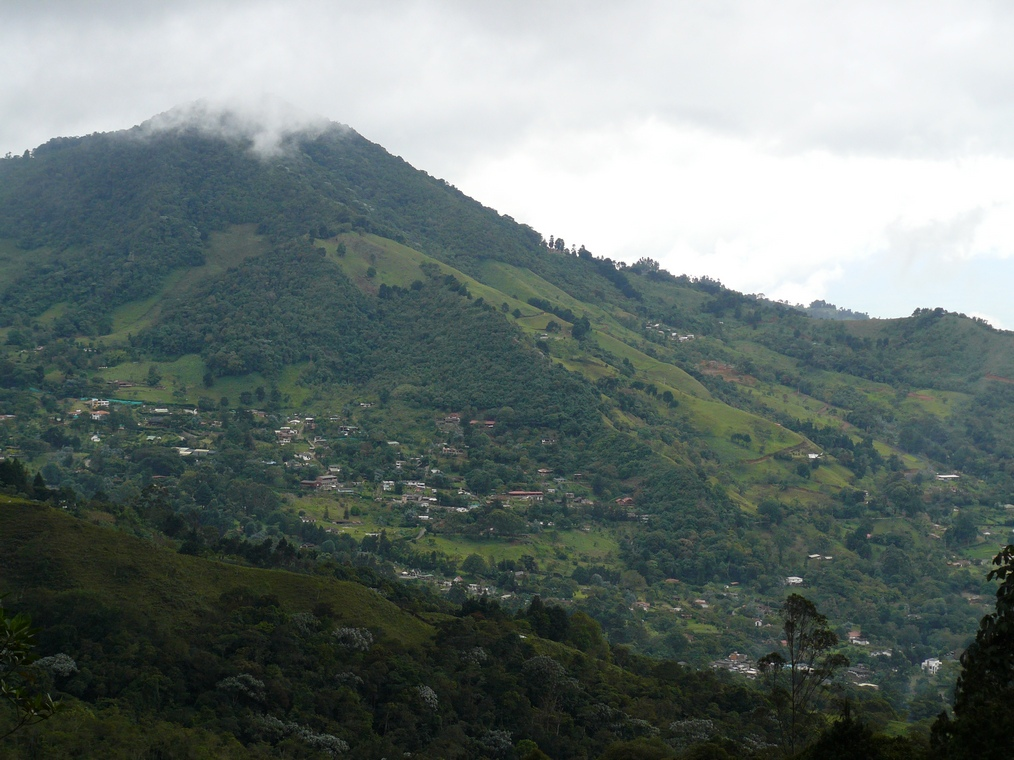
- Rincón Dapa Sector and the Antenna Mountain

- Location within Colombia
- Coordinates: 3°33′40.1″N 76°33′24.68″W
- Country: Colombia
- Department: Valle del Cauca
- Elevation: 1,800 m (5,900 ft)

Dapa is a corregimiento and area of weekend homes in the Valle del Cauca Department of west central Colombia. It is located in the mountains about 15 kilometers (9 miles) northwest of the city of Cali. It is a township within the Municipality of Yumbo.

== Geography and Access ==
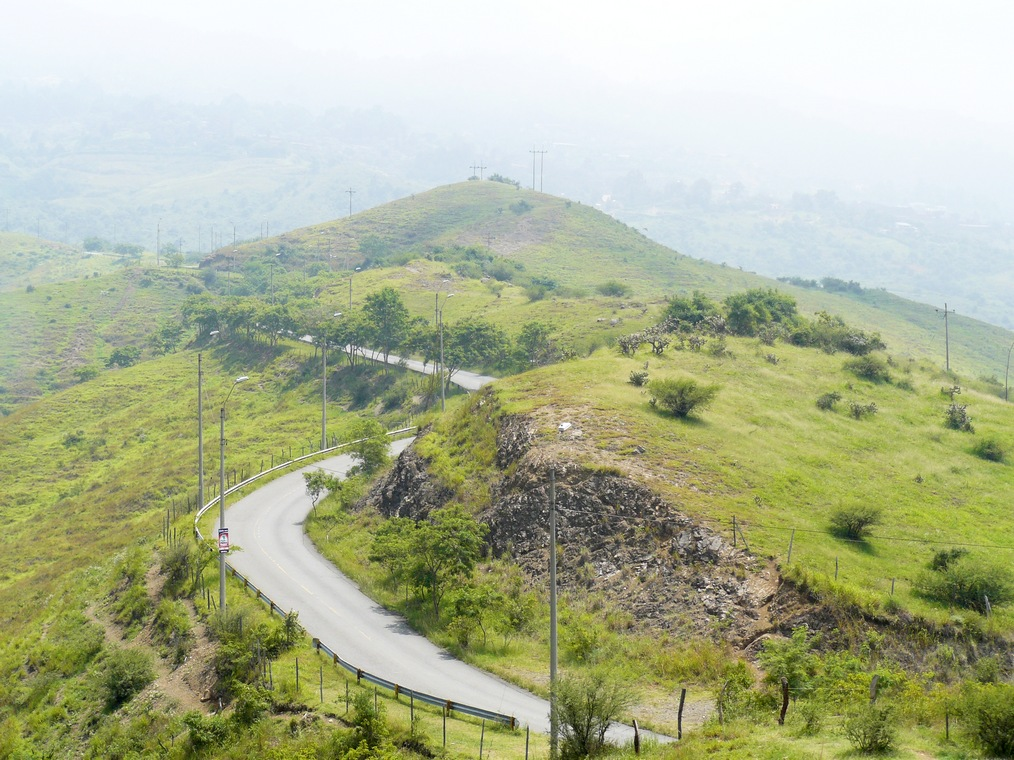
Carretera Dapa

Dapa is located on the east slope of the West Andes above the Cauca River Valley. The elevation ranges from 1,200 m (3,900 ft) in the foothills to 2,100 m (6,900 ft) along the highest ridges. The lower section is called Pilas de Dapa where the road crosses the Arroyohondo River and starts the climb up the mountain. The main population lives above 1,500 m (4,900 ft) which is divided up into several sections: Medio Dapa is located about halfway up the mountain and consists mainly of homes and farms. Miravalle is the main center of population farther up the mountain and has a police station, school, and several businesses, along with many homes and a church further along the road. Rincón Dapa is farther up the mountain and is situated in a bowl that is shaped by several streams that come together to form the Arroyohondo River. It is an area of large estates, farms, homes, a school, and scattered businesses like stores and restaurants. Alto Dapa is located above Miravalle and is mainly an area of estates and farms.

The main road, Carretera Dapa, is a paved road in mediocre condition that starts at the Cali-Yumbo road and winds through the lower part of Arroyohondo before climbing up the mountain into the main part of Dapa. As the road winds up the mountain is passes through a massive rangeland with xeric vegetation and affords wonderful views of the canyon of the Arroyohondo River and the Cauca Valley.

Various unpaved roads leave Dapa in different directions towards other rural locations. To the west, the Dapa-Chicoral road leads through the Cerro Dapa Carisucio Forest Reserve and the pass at 2,100 m (6,900 ft) to drop into the Hindú tea plantation and the area of Chicoral. The road continues on towards La Cumbre. To the south there are two roads: one leading towards La Paz and eventually the western edge of Cali and another towards the Kilometer 18 of the Cali-Buenaventura Road. To the north and east there is a road leading towards Yumbo.

== Climate and Ecosystems ==
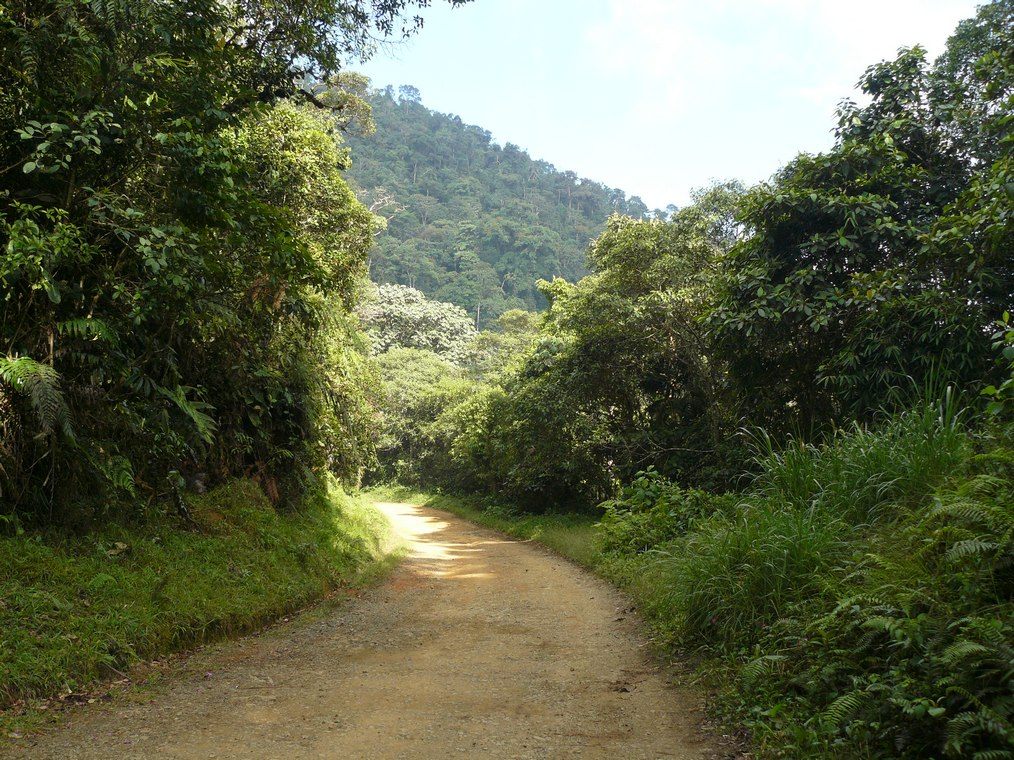
The Dapa-Chicoral Road as it passes through the cloud forest

The climate ranges from tropical to subtropical with various habitat types represented. In the lower reaches there are patches of dry forest, arid rangeland with scattered trees, riparian woodlands, and gardens. In the upper parts there are patches of humid forest, matorral, shrubby pastures, gardens, cultivations and cloud forest. Dapa is situated within the Arroyohondo watershed, which drains into the Cauca River north of Cali. The native habitats of Dapa, which unfortunately are highly degraded and fragmented, are representative of the Cauca Valley Dry Forest Ecoregion in the lower parts and the Cauca Valley Montane Forest Ecoregion in the upper reaches.

On the ridges above Dapa is the Dapa Carisucio Forest Reserve.

== History ==
Dapa was formed in 1958.

== Recreation ==
There are a variety of outdoor activities available in Dapa. Some of the most popular are hiking, birdwatching, mountain biking, horseback riding, and off-road vehicle use.

== See also ==
- Andean Region, Colombia
