= Pico Loro =

Mountain near Cali, Colombia

Coordinates: 3°30′27″N 76°41′49″W

Pico Loro is a mountain peak in the Farallones de Cali near the city of Cali in Colombia. Pico Loro means Parrot Peak in Spanish. The mountain is part of the national park the PNN Farallones de Cali. This is peak of rock and tropical jungle. From the top is possible watch the path of the Cauca River, one of the biggest Colombian rivers. The peak is a popular destination for people from the city of Cali, especially at the weekend.
