= Dagua =

- Municipality and town
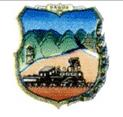
- Flag Coat of arms

- Location of the municipality and town of Dagua in the Valle del Cauca Department of Colombia.

- Location in Colombia
- Coordinates: 3°40′N 76°42′W
- Country: Colombia
- Department: Valle del Cauca Department

Area
  - Total: 886 km^{2} (342 sq mi)

Population (2015)
  - Total: 36,400
- Time zone: UTC-5 (Colombia Standard Time)
- Climate: Am

Dagua (Spanish pronunciation: [ˈdaɣwa]) is a town and municipality located in the Department of Valle del Cauca, Colombia.

== History ==
Dagua was founded in 1909.

== Corregimientos ==
1. Santa María

2. El Salado

3. El Chilcal

4. Providencia

5. El Danubio

6. La Cascada

7. La Elsa

8. El Queremal

9. El Limonar

10. Los Alpes

11. La Providencia

12. Atuncela

13. Loboguerrero

14. El Naranjo

15. Juntas

16. Zabaletas

17. El Piñal

18. Zelandia

19. El Rucio

20. Pepitas

21. Villahermosa

22. El Palmar

23. Borrero Ayerbe

24. El Carmen

25. San Bernardo

26. Jiguales

27. Kilómetro 18

29. San Vicente

30. Cisneros.

31. La Clorinda
