= Pance River =

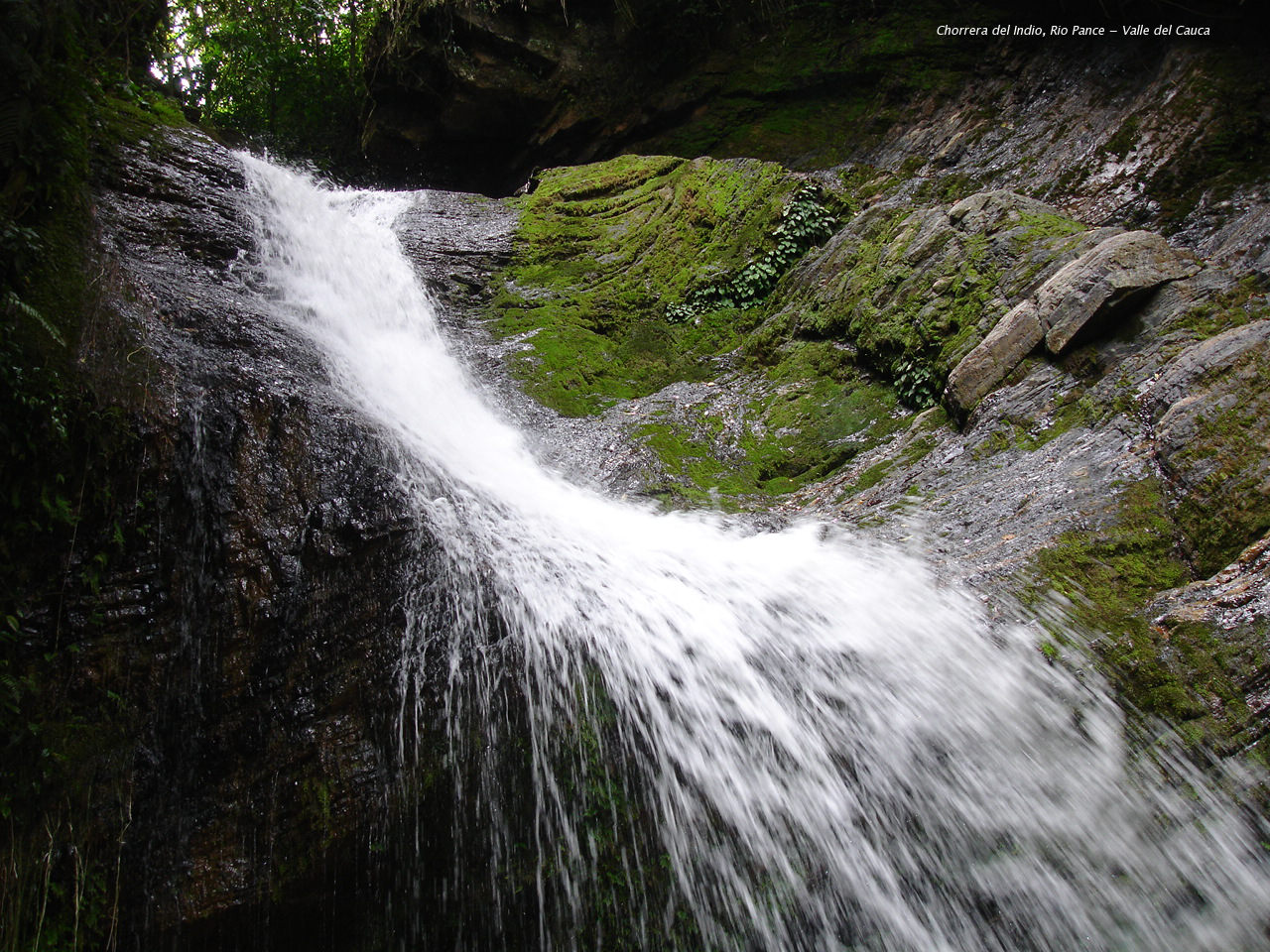
Waterfall on the Pance River

The Pance River flows along the southern side of Cali, Colombia and is a popular place for locals for recreation and leisure activities. It is one of the only rivers in the city that is not polluted, and in which people can still swim.

The Pance River is one of the major rivers in Cali. Its source is in the Farallones de Cali, in the Pico Pance, the highest mountain in the Western Cordillera, at over 4,000 metres (13,000 ft). The river is more than 25 kilometres (16 mi) long and flows in a west–east direction into the river Jamundí-turn, a tributary of the Cauca River, draining a catchment area of 89.75 square kilometres (34.65 sq mi). Pance has a flow rate of 2.59 cubic metres per second (91 cu ft/s) passing through the station Comfamiliar Pance.

In the initial part the waters are fast, cool and clear, showing low levels of contamination. The river is a popular destination for the inhabitants of Cali. In the area known as the Maelstrom there are several restaurants and recreational parks.

== Ecology ==
Along with the rivers Claro and Jamundí, the number of species of orchids in and around the forests of the Pance river watershed is considerably higher than other sites at a given altitude range.
