= Cordillera Occidental (Colombia) =

Mountain range in Colombia

- Western Ranges
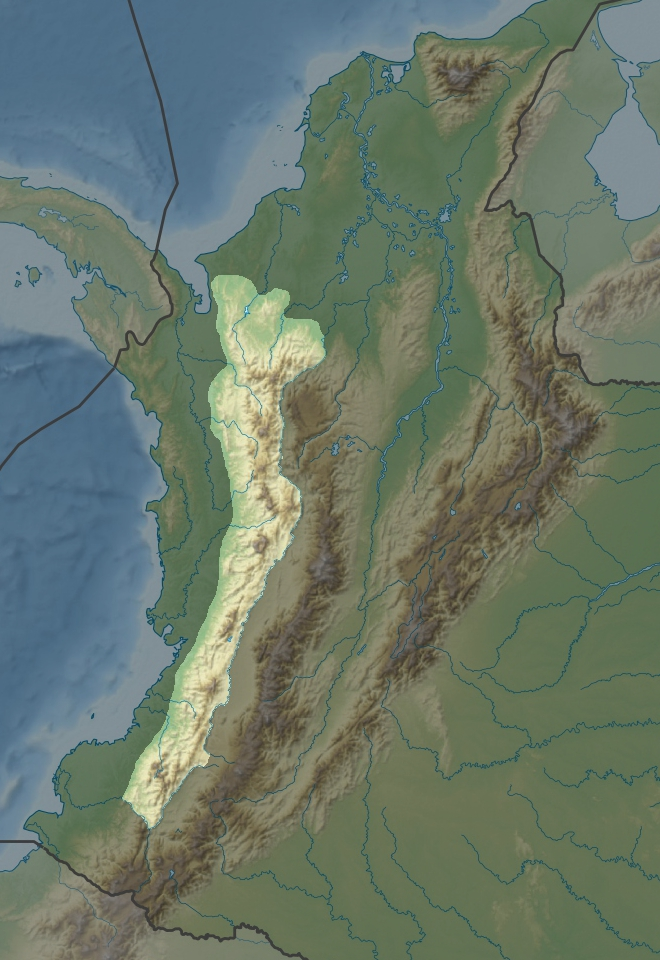

Highest point
- Peak: Cerro Tatamá
- Elevation: 4,100 m (13,500 ft)

Dimensions
- Length: 1,200 km (750 mi) north-south
- Area: 86,239 km^{2} (33,297 mi^{2})

Geography
- Location within Colombia
- Country: Colombia
- Range coordinates: 4°51′N 76°23′W

The Cordillera Occidental (English: Western Ranges) is the lowest in elevation of the three branches of the Colombian Andes. The average altitude is 2,000 m (6,600 ft) and the highest peak is Cerro Tatamá at 4,100 m (13,500 ft). The range extends from south to north diverging from the Colombian Massif in Nariño Department, passes north through Cauca, Valle del Cauca, Risaralda, Chocó, and Caldas Departments to the Paramillo Massif in Antioquia and Córdoba Departments. The cordillera is paralleled on the east by the Cauca river. From this massif the range divides further to form the Serranías de Ayapel, San Jerónimo and Abibe, receding into the Caribbean plain and the Sinú River valley.

It is a direct continuation of the Cordillera Occidental of Ecuador.

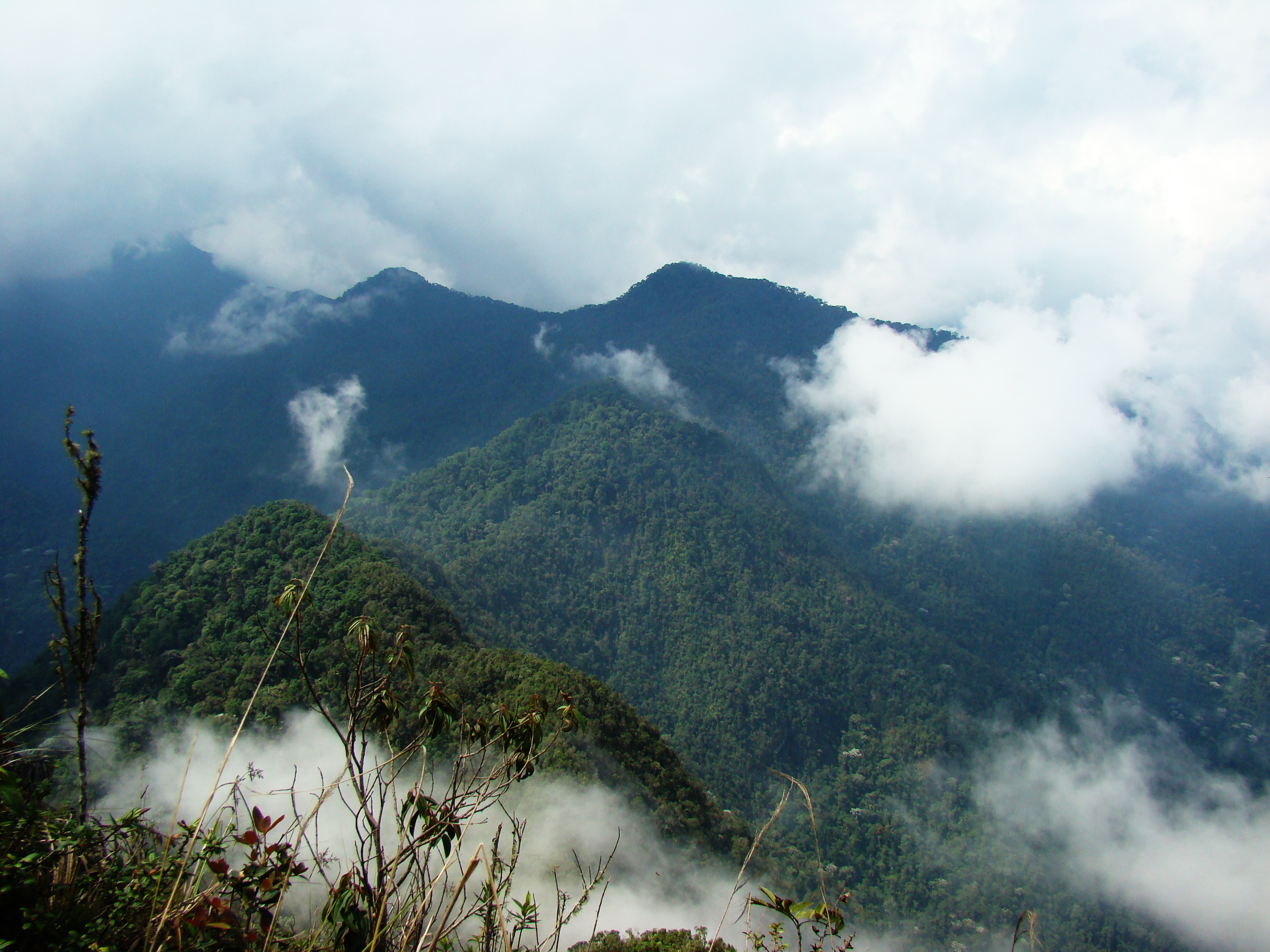
Pico de Loro (Parrot Peak) in the Farallones de Cali

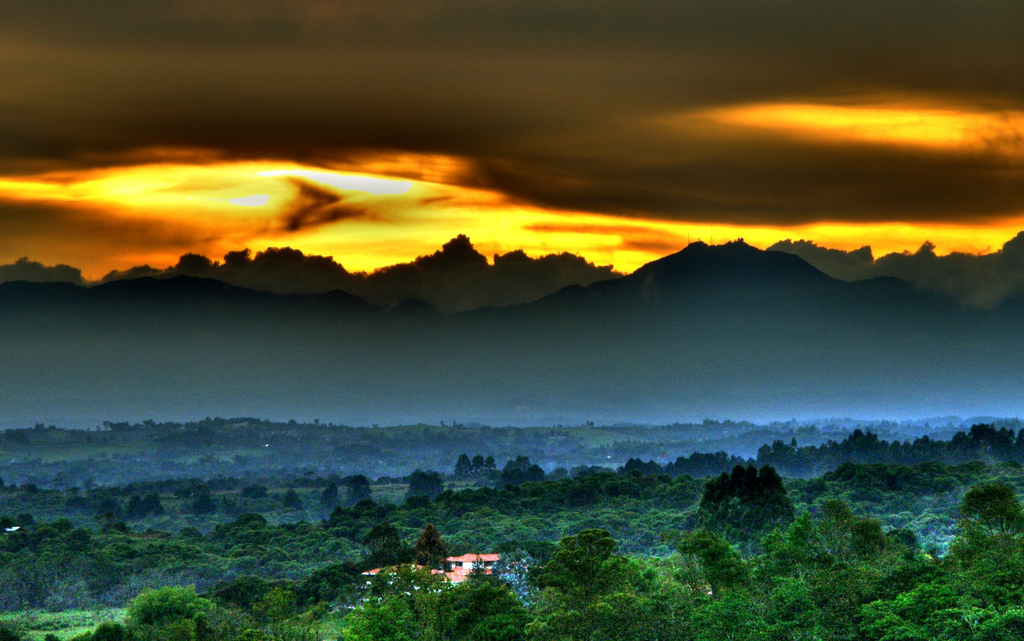
Munchique's Mountain

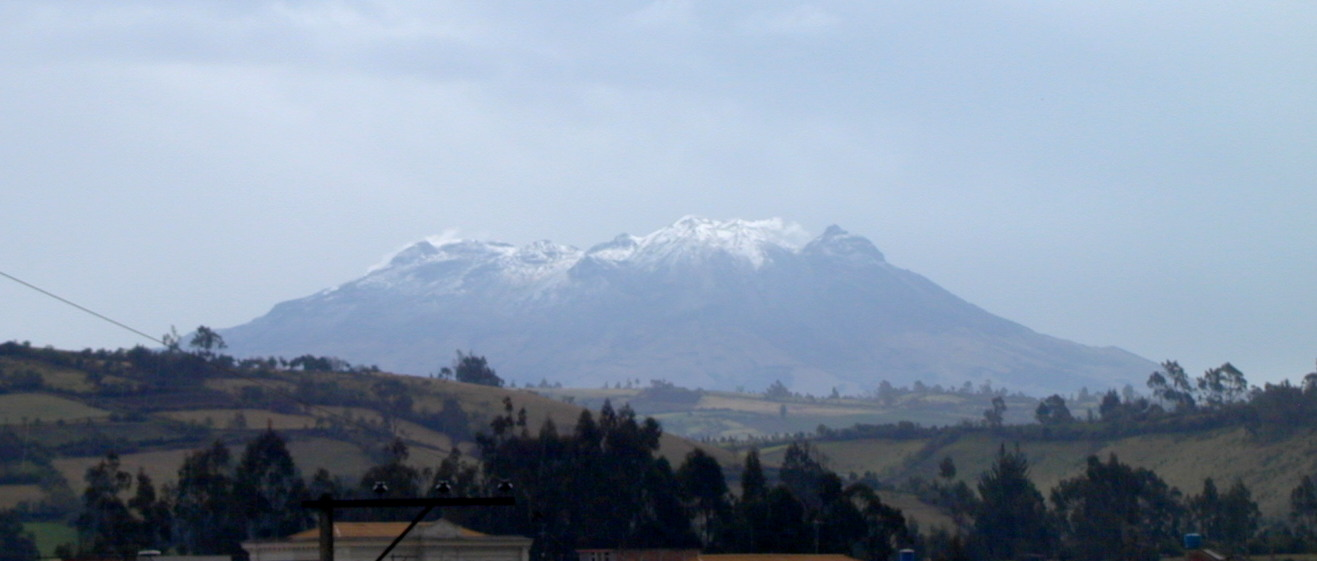
Cumbal Volcano

== Geography ==
The western part of the mountain range belongs to the Pacific region of Colombia, with the San Juan River being the main watershed, while the eastern part belongs to the Cauca River basin. The northern and northwestern parts belong to the Atlantic Slope, with the Atrato and Sinú Rivers being the main watersheds. The Cordillera Occidental is separated from the coastal Baudó Mountains by the Atrato River.

A number of ecoregions cover the cordillera. The Chocó–Darién moist forests cover the western foothills below 1000 meters elevation. The Northwestern Andean montane forests cover the humid western slopes of the range. The Cauca Valley montane forests cover the eastern slopes. Northern Andean páramo covers the highest elevations.

=== Highest peaks ===
- Cerro Tatamá – 4,100 m (13,500 ft) – Chocó & Risaralda
- Azufral – 4,070 m (13,350 ft) – Nariño
- Farallones de Cali – 4,050 m (13,290 ft) – Valle del Cauca
- Farallones del Citará – 4,050 m (13,290 ft) – Antioquia
- Páramo de Frontino – 3,950 m (12,960 ft) – Antioquia
- Cerro Caramanta – 3,900 m (12,800 ft) – Antioquia, Caldas & Risaralda
- Cerro Napi – 3,860 m (12,660 ft) – Cauca
- Alto Musinga – 3,850 m (12,630 ft) – Antioquia
- Cerro Calima – 3,840 m (12,600 ft) – Valle del Cauca
- Cerro Paramillo – 3,730 m (12,240 ft) – Antioquia
- Cerro Ventana – 3,450 m (11,320 ft) – Valle del Cauca & Chocó

== Protected areas ==
The West Andes have the following nationally protected areas from south to north:

- PNN Munchique
- PNN Farallones de Cali
- PNN Tatamá
- PNN Las Orquídeas
- PNN Paramillo

Other areas under consideration for national protection include:

- Serranía del Pinche
- Serranía de los Paraguas

=== Locally protected areas ===
- Yotoco Forest Reserve
- Bitaco River Forest Reserve

== Recreation areas ==
- Dapa
- Calima Lake

== See also ==
- Geography of Colombia
- Andean Region, Colombia
- Cordillera Central (Colombia)
- Cordillera Oriental (Colombia)
- List of mountains in Colombia
