= El Gato del Río =

Sculpture in Cali, Colombia

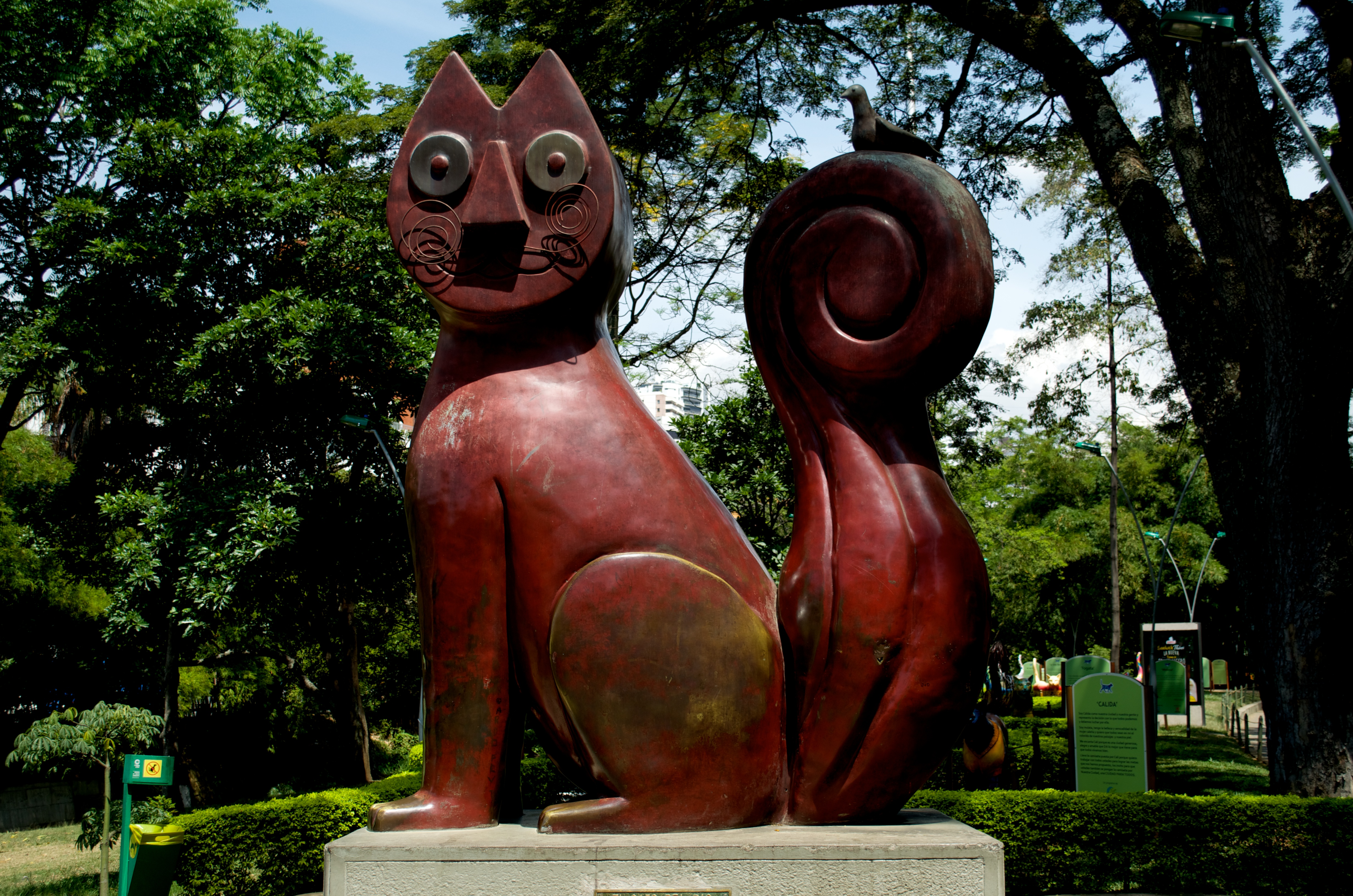
- Artist: Hernando Tejada
- Medium: Bronze
- Dimensions: 3.5 m × 3.4 m × 1.95 m (140 in × 130 in × 77 in)
- Weight: 3 tons
- Location: Cali, Colombia

El Gato del Río ("The River Cat") is a sculpture by Colombian artist Hernando Tejada. The sculpture was inaugurated on July 3, 1996 and is located on the side of the Cali River in Cali, Colombia. Over time, it has turned into a famous landmark of the city along with the monument to Sebastián de Belalcázar and Cristo Rey.

Today the area near the sculpture has turned into a park with cat sculptures by several artists known as the Parque El Gato De Tejada or the "Cat Park".

== History ==
In 1996, a plan was created to beautify the banks of the Cali River on the city's north side. For this project, Tejada donated this sculpture to the city. The sculpture was created in bronze in the studio of Rafael Franco in Bogotá. To transport the sculpture to the city, the roof of the studio had to be removed.

El Gato del Río was inaugurated on July 3, 1996, which is celebrated as the independence day in Cali. The monument was situated on the Avenida del Río in an area with high foot traffic.

Below the sculpture is a plaque that reads:

El gato del río
Escultura en bronce elaborada por el maestro
Hernando Tejada
Bajo el auspicio del gobernador
del Valle del Cauca
Germán Villegas Villegas
y el alcalde de Santiago de Cali
Mauricio Guzmán Cuevas
Santiago de Cali Julio 3 de 1996

=== Las novias del gato ===
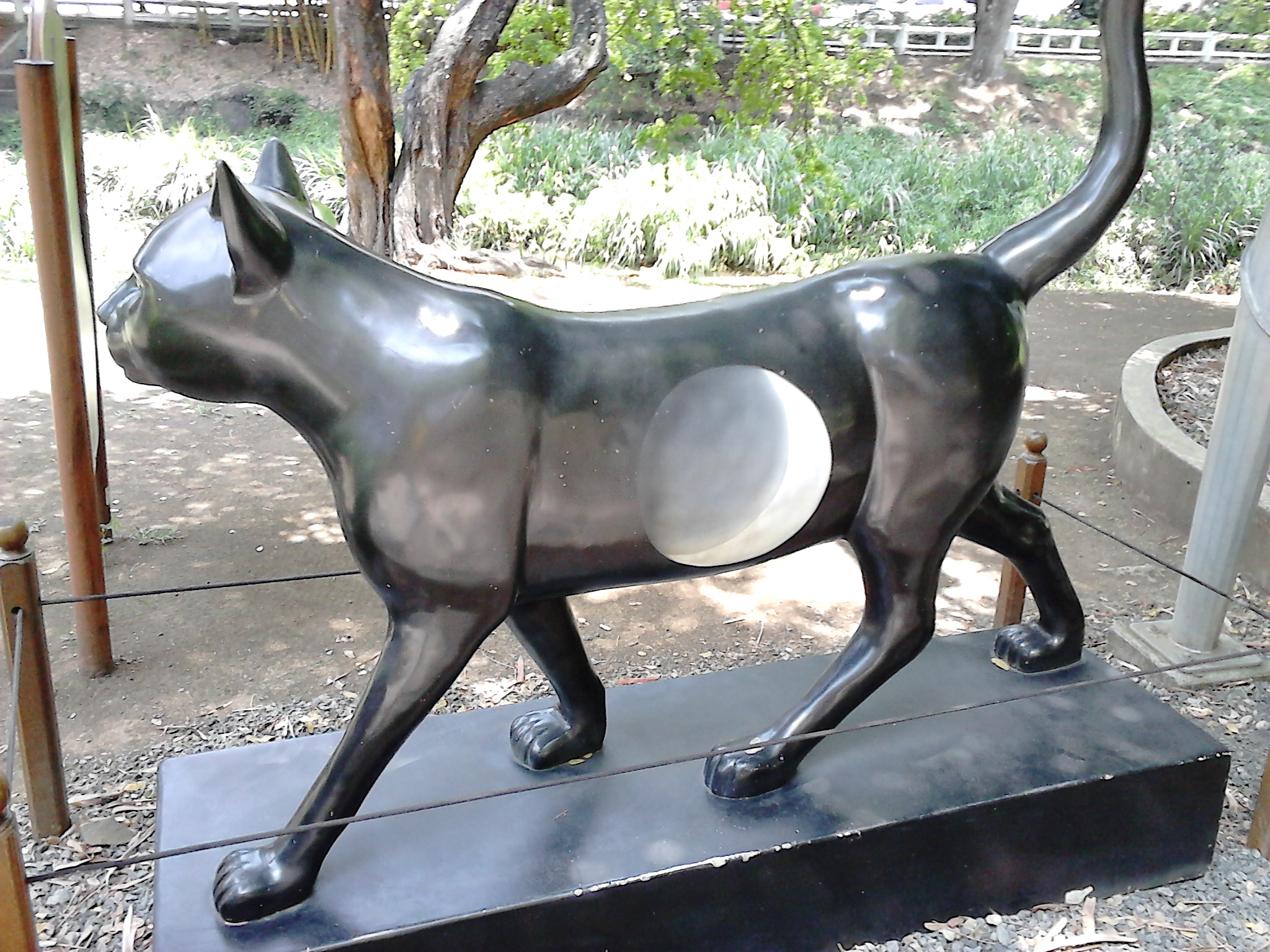
One of the river cat's girlfriends.

In 2006, the city planned a revitalization project for the area, which included adding new sculptures near El Gato del Río by other artists. The project consisted of adding 15 new cat sculptures of the same size and shape but painted by different Colombian artists. These new cat sculptures became known as las novies del gato ("the cat's girlfriends"). Famous Colombian artists contributed cats, including Maripaz Jaramillo, Roberto Molano, Diego Pombo, Cecilia Coronel, Pedro Alcántara, and Omar Rayo.

Today, there are more than 15 cat sculptures exhibited and some of these have been distributed throughout the city.

== See also ==
- La Tertulia Museum
