= Hernando Tejada =

Colombian painter (1924-1998)

Hernando Tejada Sáenz
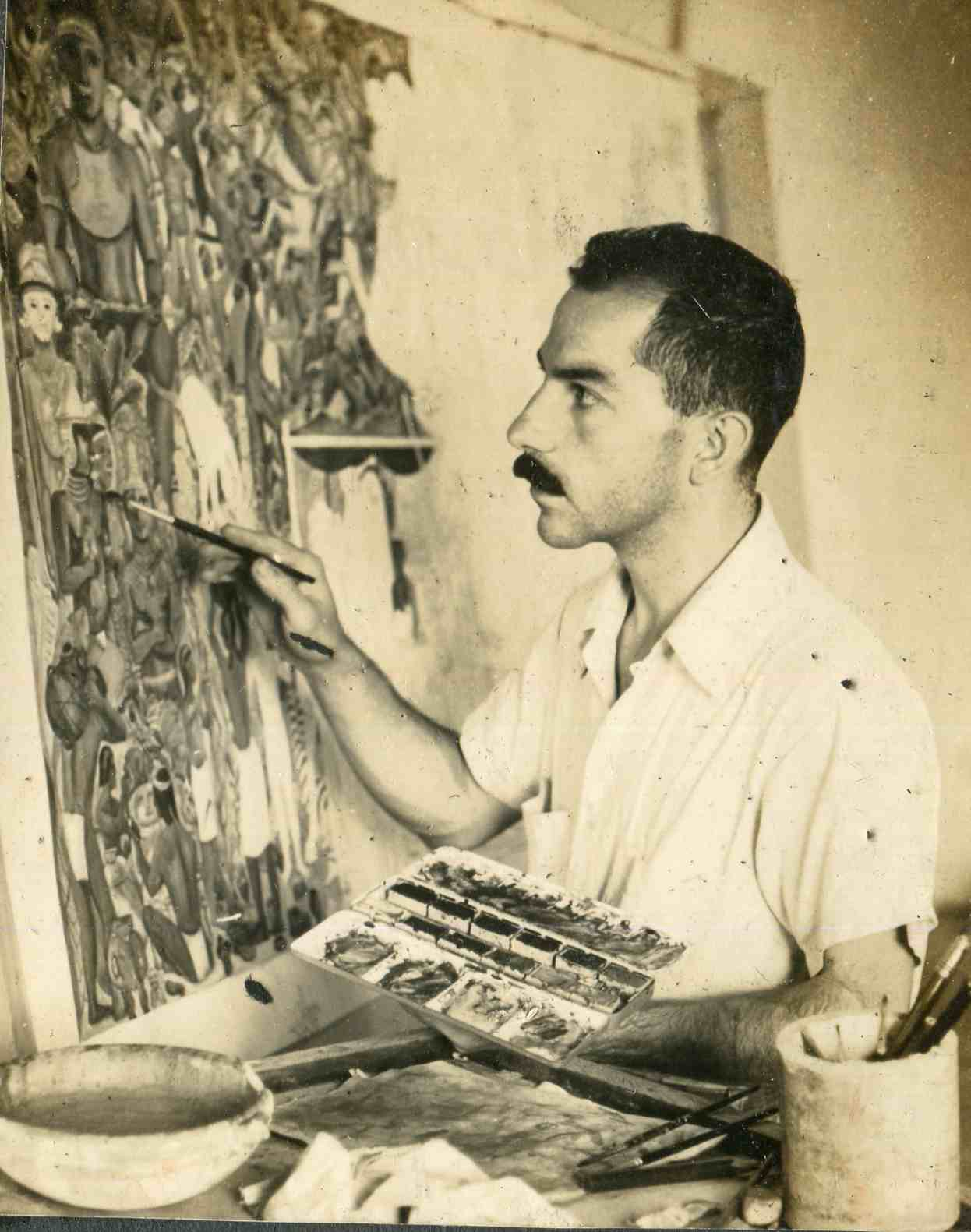
- Portrait photography of Tejada c. 1963
- Born: February 1, 1924; Pereira, Colombia
- Died: June 1, 1998 (aged 74); Cali, Colombia
- Education: Departmental Institute of Fine Arts; National University of Colombia
- Known for: Sculpture, painting
- Notable work: El Gato del Río
- Website: www.hernandotejada.com

Hernando Tejada Sáenz (February 1, 1924 in Pereira, Colombia – June 1, 1998 in Cali, Colombia), was a Colombian painter and sculptor. His most well-known sculpture, El Gato del Río, is a famous landmark of Cali, Colombia.

Women and cats were common themes in his works. In his later years, another theme was the inclusion of mangroves and their surrounding environment.

Hernando Tejada received the nickname of Tejadita, a diminutive of his last name, which alluded to the artist's relatively short stature of 1.50 meters tall.

== Biography ==
His early childhood life was in Manizales, along with his parents, José Tejada and Ismenia Sáenz, four brothers, and two sisters, including Lucy Tejada who was also an accomplished artist, and less recognized, his sister Teresita Tejada. In 1937 his family moved to the city of Cali where he studied at the Departmental Institute of Fine Arts with its founder and Professor Jesús María Espinosa and completed his studies at the National School of Fine Arts in Bogotá (today a part of the National University of Colombia).

Besides traditional painting, Tejada often worked with wood. He created a series of "furniture-piece" women, such as Teresa la mujer mesa ("Teresa the woman table") in 1969. For one of his final wooden series, he sculpted mangroves and animals together, including snakes, monkeys, and pelicans. His mangrove series was exhibited at the 1998 Lisbon World Exposition in Portugal.

His last bronze sculpture was El Gato del Río, also known as El Gato de Tejada ("Tejada's Cat"). The sculpture is over three meters tall and three tons. It is located on the riverside of the Cali River and was gifted by Tejada to the city.

He died in Cali in 1998 after 43 days of hospitalization. After his death, his family sought to donate more than 3,000 paintings and 70 large works of art by the artist to art or cultural institutions in Cali. However, at the time of his death there was no serious interest in receiving his family's donation. In 2006, the Medellín Museum of Modern Art accepted the donation, including the artist's former house.

== Work ==
Throughout the entirety of his artistic career, Hernando Tejada worked with multiple types of mediums including drawing, painting, sculpture, photography, and audiovisual work.

Cats, women, and mangroves were common themes in his works. Tejada's experiences in his travels across Colombia and Europe helped finish shaping his artistic style as it happened with Henri Matisse and Paul Gauguin during their travels to Tahiti and with Wassily Kandinsky in Tunisia.

=== Cats ===
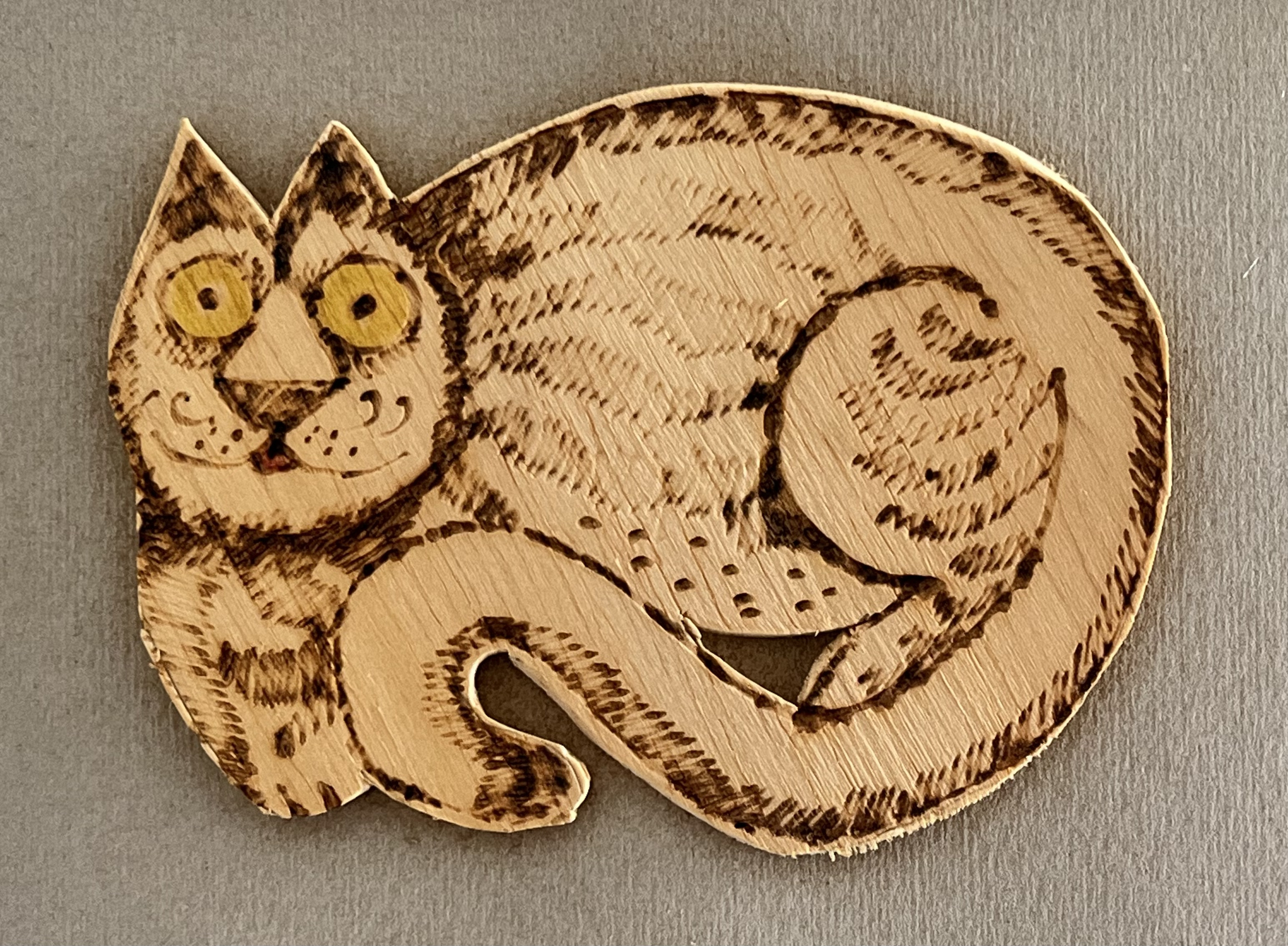
Gato en reposo (1979), carved and pigmented wood

The theme for which Hernando Tejada is mostly known is his depictions of the domestic cat, a recurring subject of artistic interpretation throughout his career. Tejada had a great admiration for the animal due to their docile, yet eradict, mysterious, and changing personalities, often comparing his own personality to this feline.

Hernando Tejada's most famous work, El gato del río, is a 3.5-meter-tall (11 ft) lost-wax cast monumental sculpture of a cat which Tejada executed in 1996 with financial support of the City of Cali. Today, it is the most visited sculpture in Colombia surpassing in popularity public sculptures by Fernando Botero, Édgar Negret, and Enrique Grau.

Tejada was renowned for gifting drawings and wooden cats to his friends and lovers.

=== Women ===
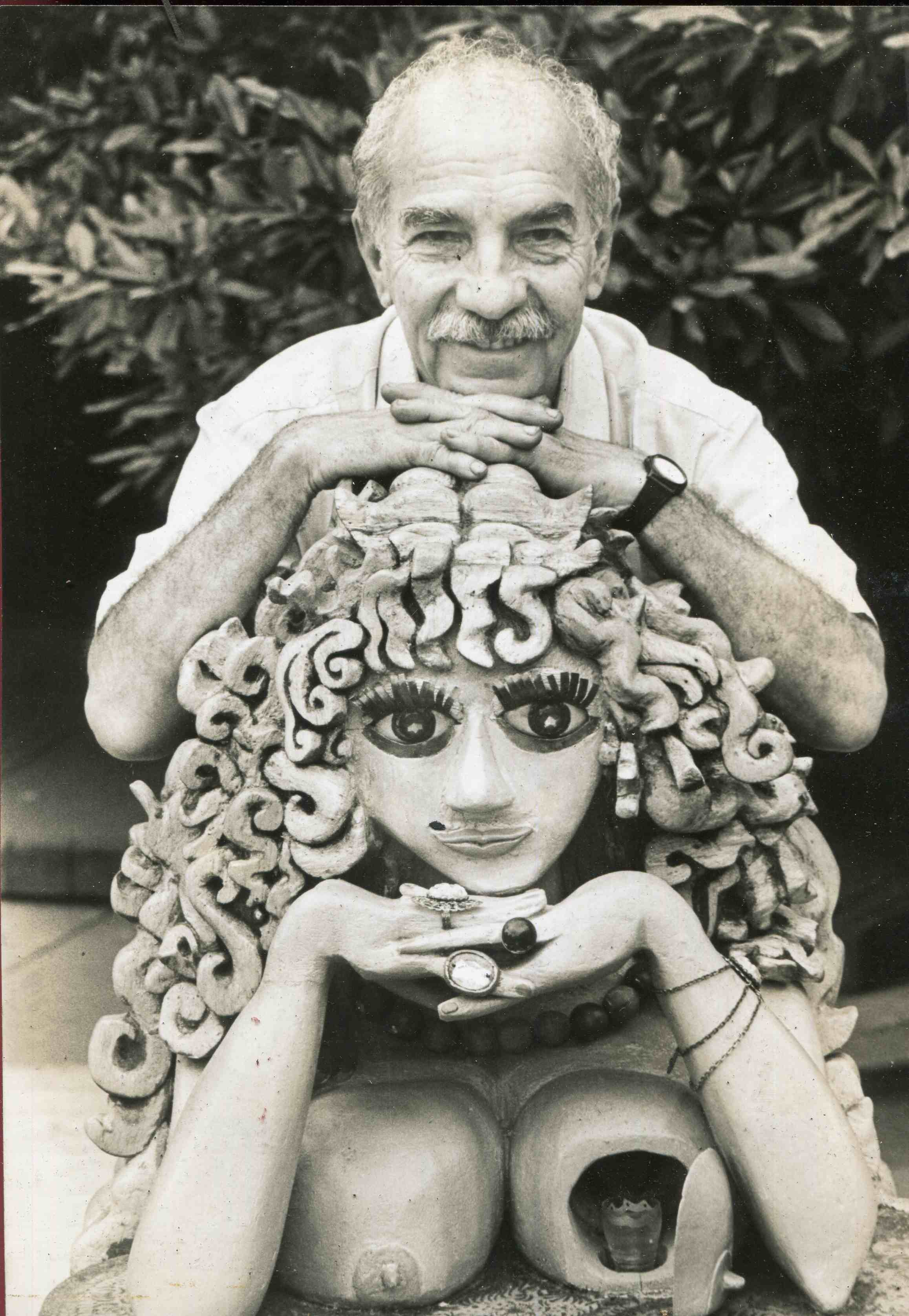
Tejada posing with Teresa, la mujer mesa (1970)

Another important theme for Hernando Tejada is his interpretation of women, more specifically his functional women, or women furniture, series. This series consists of functional objects such as chairs, tables, and musical instruments in the figure of a woman. Tejada's first known work in this series was, and one of his first works with wood, is Rosario, la mujer armario executed in 1968, which Tejada produced with the necessity of needing a drawer to store socks. In this series, others work include Teresa, la mujer mesa (1969), Sacramento, la mujer asiento (1970) which Tejada executed for the II Medellín Art Biennal, Isadora, la lechuza mecedora (1971), Abigail, la mujer atril (1972), Leonor, el tocador (1973), Paula, la mujer jaula (1974), Estefanía, la mujer telefonía (1975) which in the permanent collection of the MAMM, Mónica filarmónica (1976) which is in La Tertulia Museum, and Violeta, la mujer cometa (1978).

Tejada incorporated women as the main theme in other artworks such as in paintings and smaller wooden objects.

=== Mangroves ===
From 1994, until 1997, Hernando Tejada produced his last artistic series around the theme of mangroves. In this series, Tejada sought to capture the wildlife and natural diversity that can be found inhabiting mangrove forests in the Pacific/Chocó natural region of Colombia.

The works in this series were entirely executed using polychrome cedar wood.

=== Monuments and murals ===
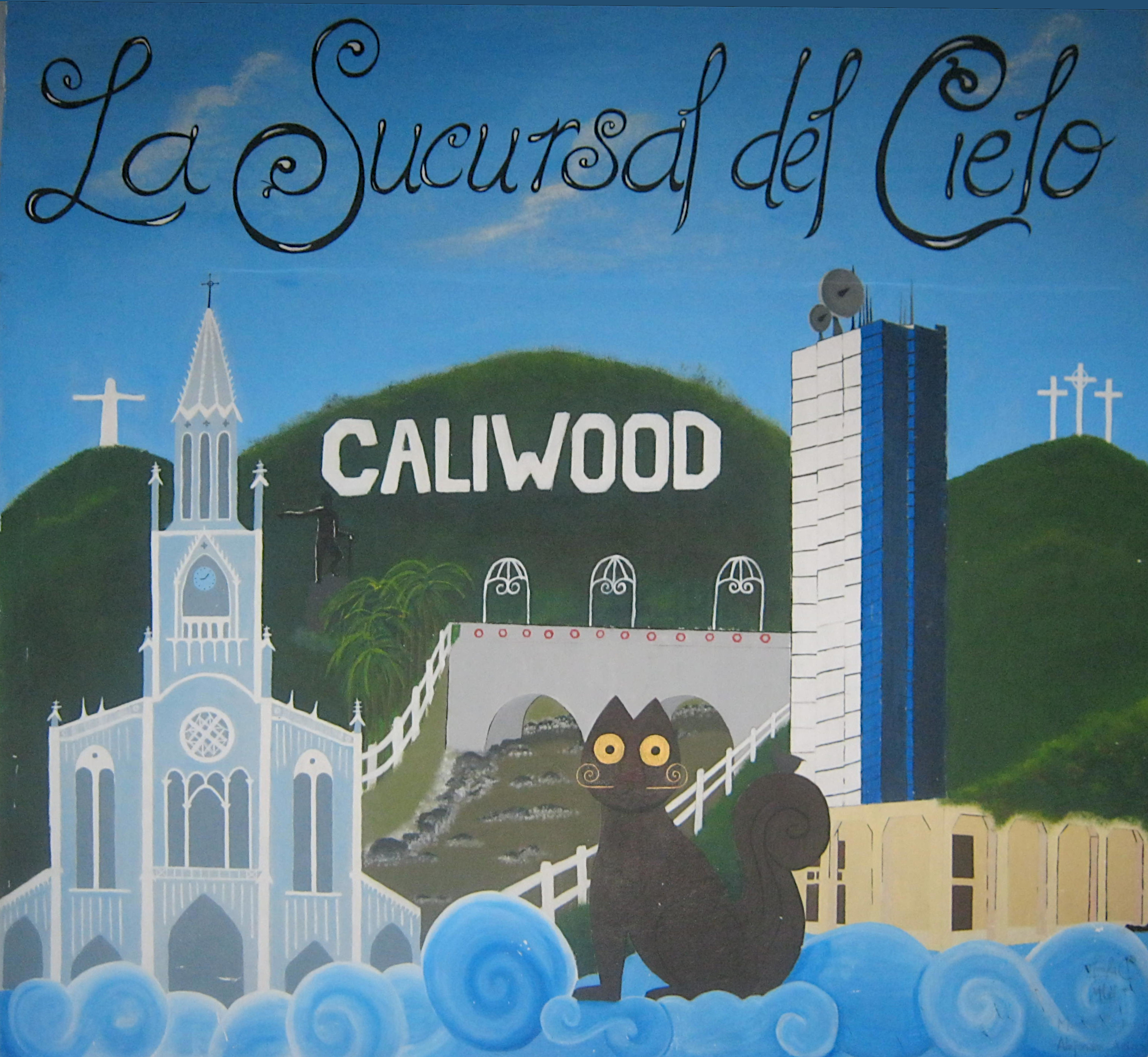
A promotional mural of Cali depicting Tejada's Gato del Río

In 1954, Hernando Tejada executed two mexican muralism-style fresco murals within the Railway Station in Cali. One of the murals, Historia de Cali (1954), depicts the history of the city of Cali with Tejada drawing attention to Calima culture natives, Sebastián de Belalcázar, and Simón Bolívar amongst other scenes that include religious, agricultural, and industrial aspects. The other mural, Historia del transporte (1954), depicts the history of transportation in the city of Cali with Tejada bringing to attention various methods of transportation which helped the city of Cali to develop. Both murals are 9.5 meters by 20 meters in size.

== Exhibitions ==
Tejada's first solo exhibition was in 1965 at La Tertulia Museum where he exhibited a number of wooden sculptures. Throughout the 1980s, Tejada was also exhibited as a solo artist at Galería Belarca, in Bogotá, Galería de Los Navas, in Cali, and at Galería Finale and in Grupo Sura's Galería Suramericana de Seguros in Medellín.

In 1976, Hernando Tejada had a shared exhibition with his sister, Lucy Tejada, at the Cultural Center of Pereira.

=== Select exhibitions ===
- 29 November 1984 – 31 December 1984: Hernando Tejada panorama de un artista at the Cali Chamber of Commerce
- 20 June 2000 – 20 June 2001: Hernando Tejada 1924 - 1998: 30 Obras en Madera at the Comfandi Cultural Center
- November 2005 – March 2006: H. Tejada: Retrospectiva su mundo at the Salón Central de MetroCali Mio
- 15 December 2014 – 22 February 2015: Tejadita: viajero y sibarita at La Tertulia Museum
- 26 April 2024 – 1 September 2024: Hernando Tejada. Viaje de vuelta at the Medellin Museum of Modern Art

== Public collections ==
Hernando Tejada's work can be found in numerous public collections within Colombia. The Bank of the Republic has both paintings and sculptures which are displayed at the Miguel Urrutia Art Museum in Bogotá or at the bank's cultural center in Cali. The National Museum of Colombia and the Bogotá Museum of Modern Art (MAMBO), both in Bogotá, maintain paintings by the artist. In Cali, the last city where Tejada worked and lived, works can be found at La Tertulia Museum and at the Hernando Tejada Museum located within El Finestral Gallery. The largest collection of Tejada's work is held by the Medellín Museum of Modern Art, in Medellín, with over 3,000 works donated by the family of the artist.

Internationally, Tejada's work can be found in the collection of the Museum of Modern Art (MoMA), in New York City.

== Gallery ==
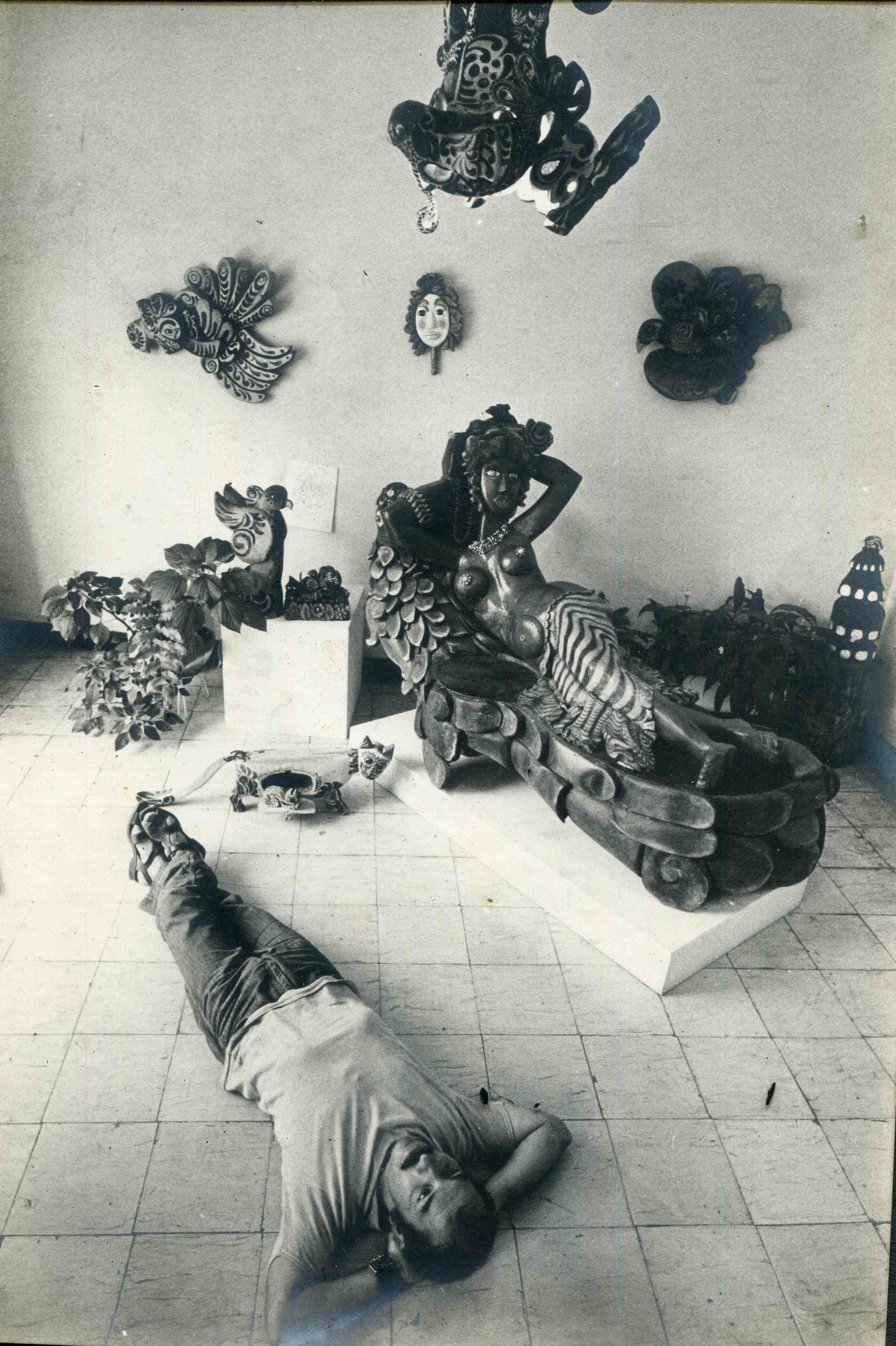
Tejada posing with several wooden sculptures, 1963

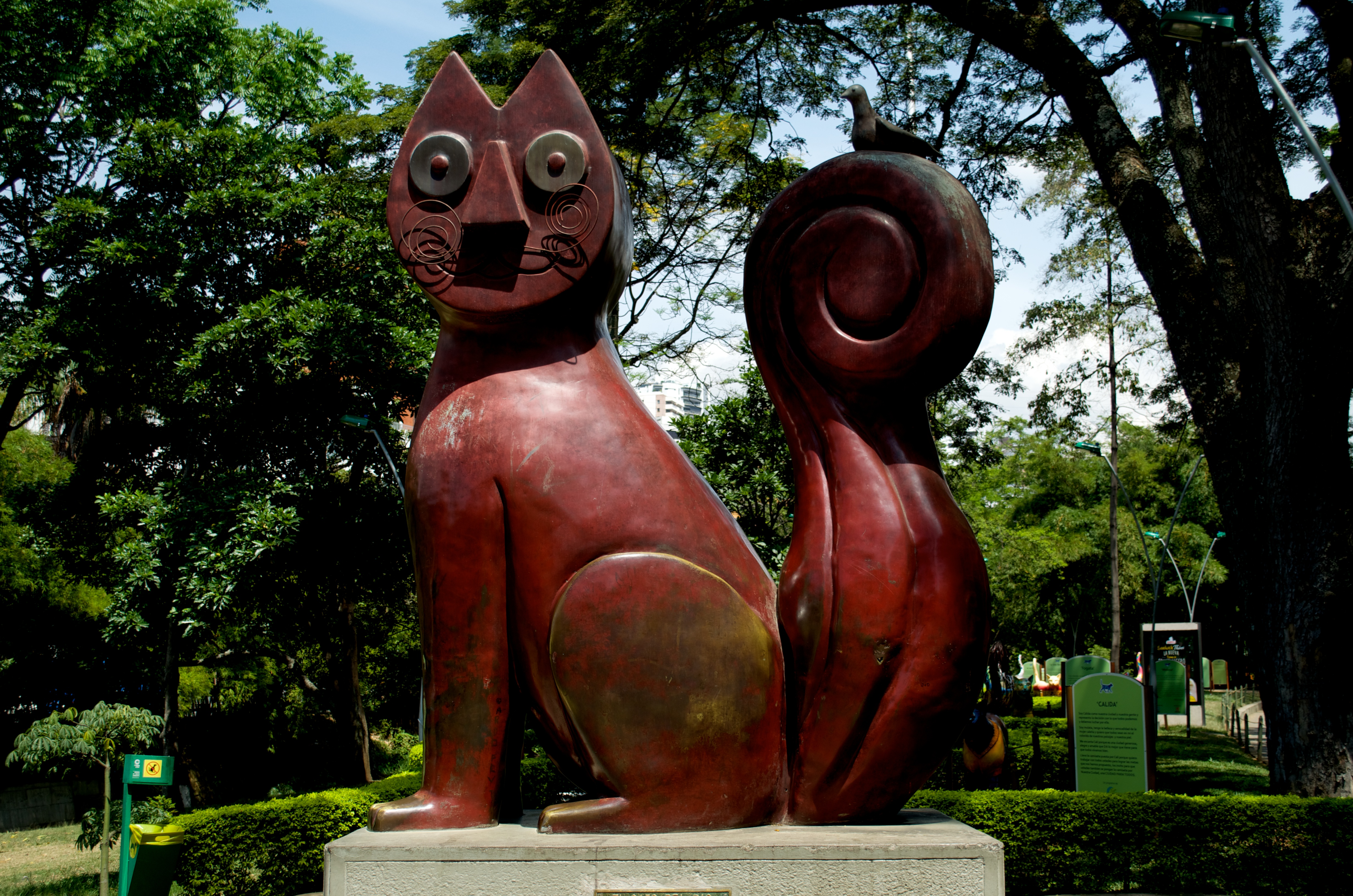
El Gato del Río (1996), a monumental sculpture in Cali

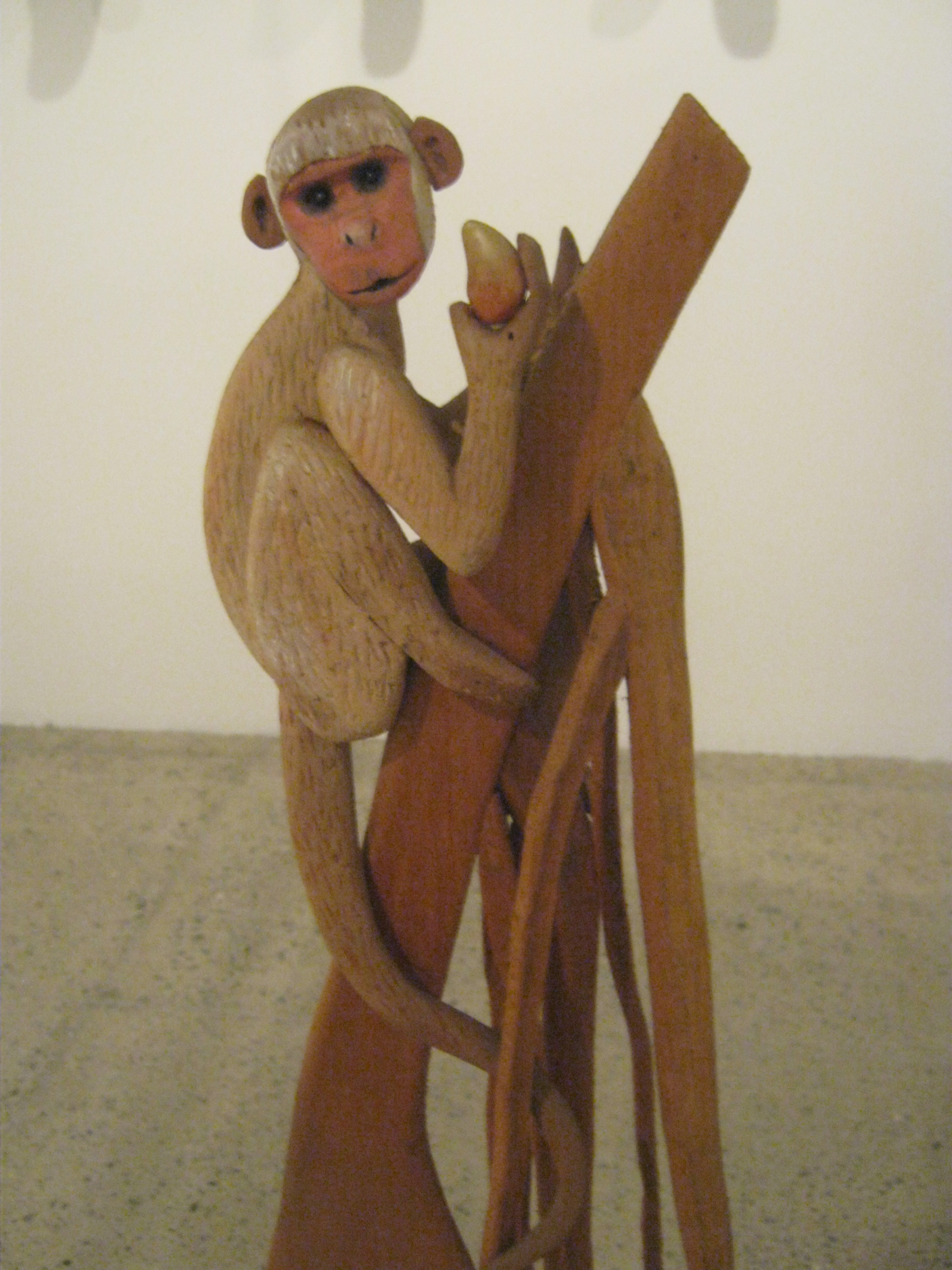
El manglar del mico (1996), La Tertulia Museum

== Selected works ==
- Portrait of Lucy Tejada (1946), oil on canvas, Miguel Urrutia Art Museum, Bogotá
- Negros y el mar (1957), oil on canvas, Bogotá Museum of Modern Art, Bogotá
- Teresa la mujer mesa (1970), carved wood, La Tertulia Museum, Cali
- Night and Day (Noche y día) (1973), print, Museum of Modern Art, New York City
- El organillero (1976), carved polychrome and pyrography carved wood, Medellín Museum of Modern Art, Medellín
- Gato en reposo (1979), carved and pigmented pyrography wood, private collection
- Organillero (1988), carved and pigmented wood, Grupo Sura, Medellín
- Manglar del mico (1993), carved and pigmented wood, La Tertulia Museum, Cali
- Manglar de la iguana (1994), carved and pigmented wood, Barranquilla Museum of Modern Art, Barranquilla
- El Gato del Río (1996), lost-wax casting, Cali
