= Lucy Tejada =

Colombian painter (1920–2011)

- Born: October 9, 1920; Pereira, Colombia
- Died: November 2, 2011 (aged 91); Cali, Colombia
- Education: Javeriana University, School of Graphic Arts of Madrid, Spain
- Known for: Painting
- Spouse: Antonio Valencia

Lucy Tejada Saenz (October 9, 1920 – November 2, 2011) was a Colombian contemporary painter. She is the sister of Hernando Tejada, another famous Colombian artist.

== Life ==
Lucy Tejada Saenz was born in Pereira, Colombia on October 9, 1920 and died in Cali, Colombia on November 2, 2011. She came from a family of artists (her brother was the painter Hernando Tejada). She lived in Cali since 1936. After the death of her mother, Lucy moved to Bogota to study at the Javeriana University, and graduated from the School of Fine arts. There she met the also painter Antonio Valencia, that later would be her husband.

She completed her training in the Saint Fernando Arts Academy and the School of Graphic Arts of Madrid, Spain. After a trip to the Guajira, in the year 1947, she had her first exhibition. In the 1950s, she traveled for five years around Europe staying in Madrid, Paris and Bucharest, where she discovered the big world museums.

== Work ==
She has permanent works at the Club Rialto of Pereira, the solo museum of Cali and in the Library Luís Ángel Arango, of Bogota. Her paintings often depict women, children, and characters with large dark eyes, reflecting a dreamlike and symbolic visual world.

Lucy Tejada exhibited her works in America and Europe, receiving prizes for her work in different national contests. Without scholarships neither support of the state, she always lived off the sale of her works. Lucy Tejada, with the support of her family and close friends, started the Lucy Tejada Foundation, with the aim to conserve and spread her work. Hernando, her brother, brought memories of Cali.

At the start of the decade of the 1950s, her work gained big international presence, when she participated at biennial events in Venecia, São Paulo, Mexico, Córdoba-Argentina, Medellín, San Juan-Puerto Rico and Havana-Cuba.

After two weeks in the unit of intensive care at the Clinic of Occidente of Cali, Lucy Tejada died peacefully on November 2, 2011. She was survived by her children Claudia and the also artist Alejandro Valencia Tejada.

Upon Tejada's death, and fulfilling her will, the family delivered to the city of Pereira a very valuable collection of 163 pieces of her work. The works of curation, study and preservation of such collection in preparation to a permanent public exhibition became reality as the Pereira municipality opened officially the Lucy Tejada Museum in 2019 as a tribute and recognition to a lifetime as an artist.

== Awards ==
- Alejandro Obregón called her "painter of the tenderness". Lucy Tejada showed many times her works in America and Europe, received several prizes, among others the Medal of the Cultural Merit in recognition to her contributions to the Colombian art during more than 50 years, and always lived of the sale of these works.
- National Prize of Painting (1957)
- Prize of Acquisition (1962)
- First place of the Tenth Festival of Art (1970)
- In the year 2008, the Ministry of Culture of Colombia awarded her the Prize "Life and Work", for her contributions and her long career in artistic painting.

== Tribute ==
On 9 October 2018, to commemorate what would have been her 98th birthday, Google released a Google Doodle celebrating her.

== Selected works ==
- Guajira (ca 1952-54), oil on canvas, Miguel Urrutia Art Museum, Bogotá
- El sembrador (1958), oil on canvas, Miguel Urrutia Art Museum, Bogotá
- Lucha de insectos (1962), oil on canvas, Bogotá Museum of Modern Art, Bogotá
- Ventana Oscura (1967), oil and ink on panel, Grupo Sura, Medellín
- A las manos – Muro de la infamia (1973), oil and ink on panel, La Tertulia Museum, Cali

== See also ==
- Culture of Colombia
- Santiago of Cali Art and culture
- Valley of the Cauca
