= Édgar Negret =

Colombian sculptor (1920–2012)

Édgar Negret Dueñas
- Born: October 11, 1920; Popayán, Colombia
- Died: October 11, 2012 (aged 92); Bogotá, Colombia
- Education: School of Fine Arts, Cali
- Known for: Sculpture
- Notable work: El Maíz
- Movement: Constructivism

Édgar Negret Dueñas (October 11, 1920 – October 11, 2012) was a Colombian abstract sculptor.

== Life ==
Negret was born in Popayán, Colombia. He attended the School of Fine Arts in Cali, Colombia, where he started his first studies in the year 1938 with the founder and teacher Jesus Maria Espinosa. Initially working in stone in styles reminiscent of European modernists like Jean Arp and Constantin Brâncuși. By the early 1950s, he began working in metal in constructivist tradition.

In 1955, his art was acquired by the Museum of Modern Art. In 1963, he won the Salón de Artistas Colombianos, and therein became one of the most prominent Colombian sculptors of the 20th century. In 1968, he was awarded the David E. Bright Sculpture Prize, at the Thirty-fourth Venice Biennial. In 1985, the Museum Negret opened. In 2010, he was awarded “Grado de Oficial” by order of the Congress of Colombia. Negret died, on his 92nd birthday, in Bogotá, Colombia.

In 2016, Google Doodle commemorated his 96th birthday.

== Recognitions and awards ==
- 1963 – XV Salón de Artistas Colombianos
- 1967 – XIX Salón de Artistas Colombianos
- 1968 – David E. Bright Sculpture Prize
- 1975 – Guggenheim Fellowship
- 1997 – Best International Artist at ARCO
- 1998 – Andrés Bello Order
- 2010 – Grado de Oficial by the Congress of Colombia

== Gallery ==
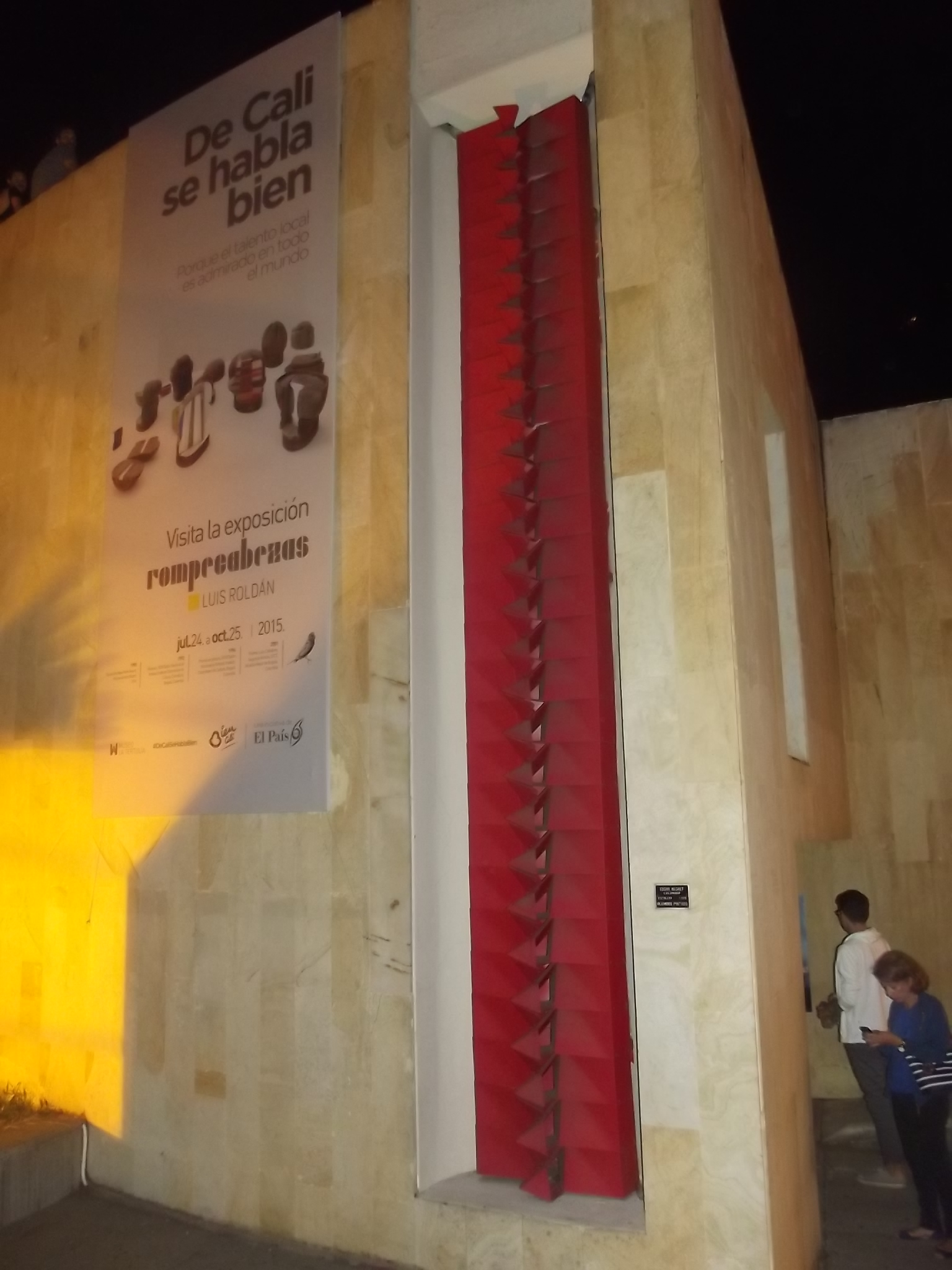
Gran Máscara (Escalera) (1972), Cali, Colombia

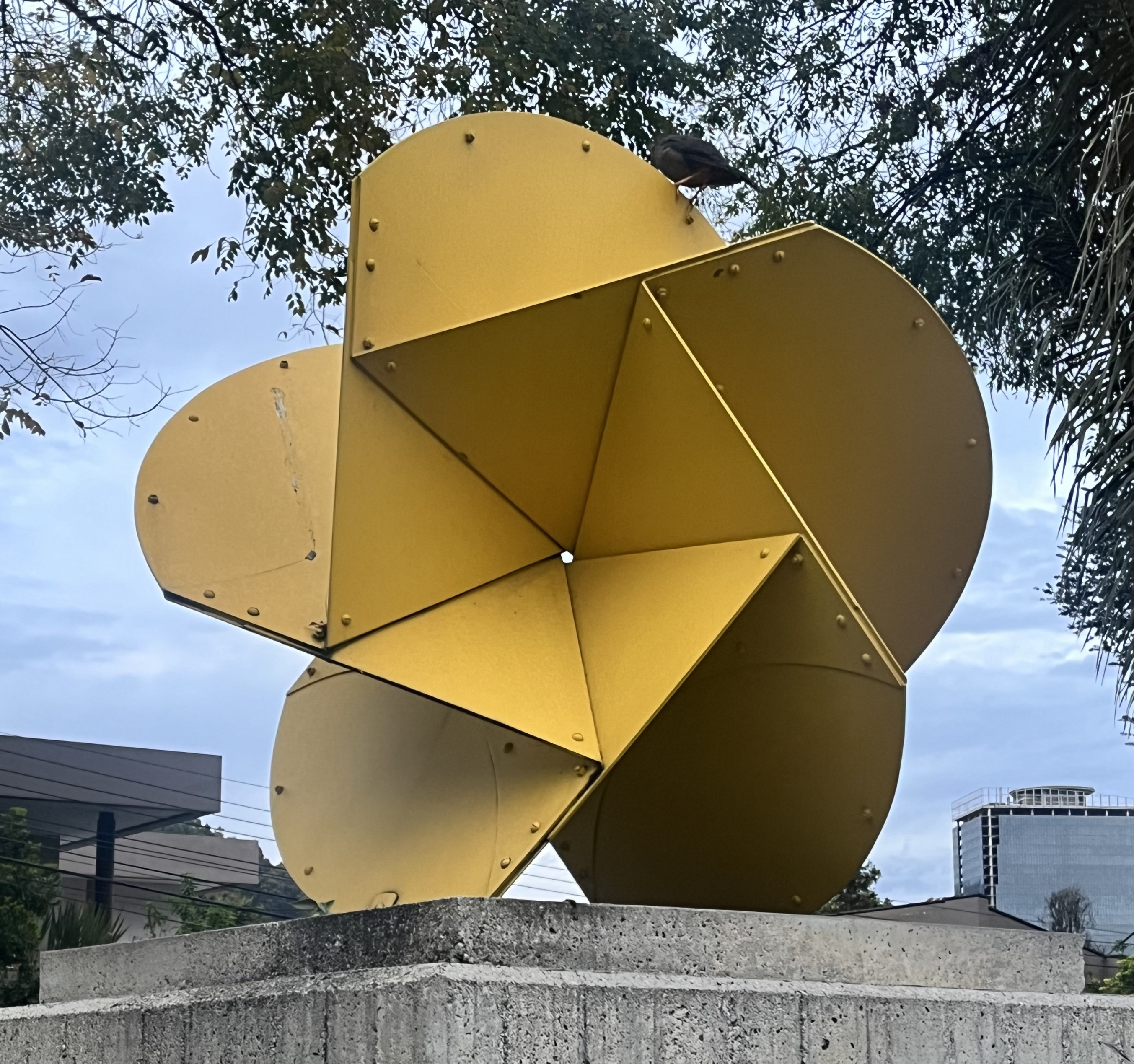
Flor Sanky (1991), Bogotá, Colombia

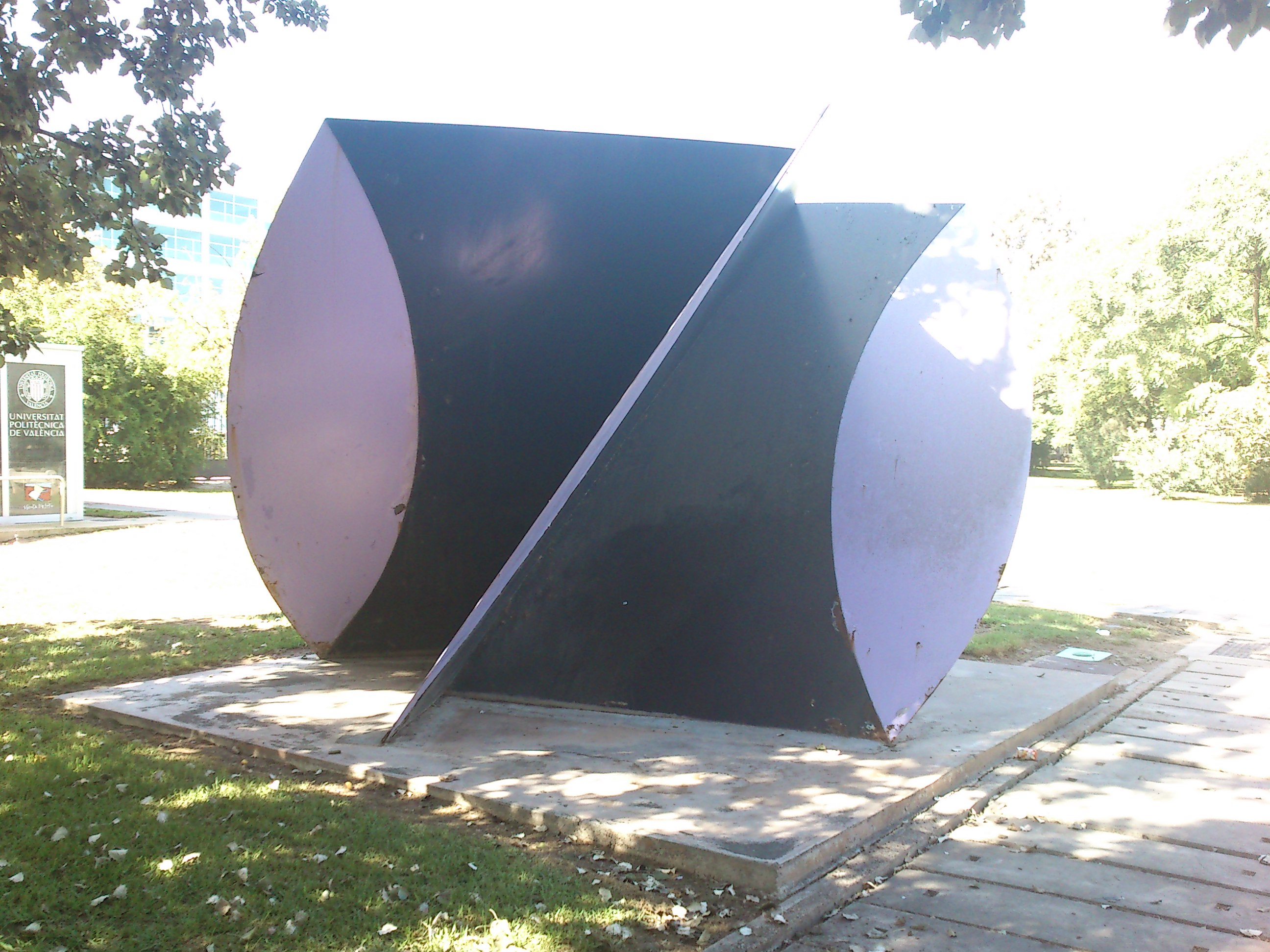
No title (1992), Valencia, Spain

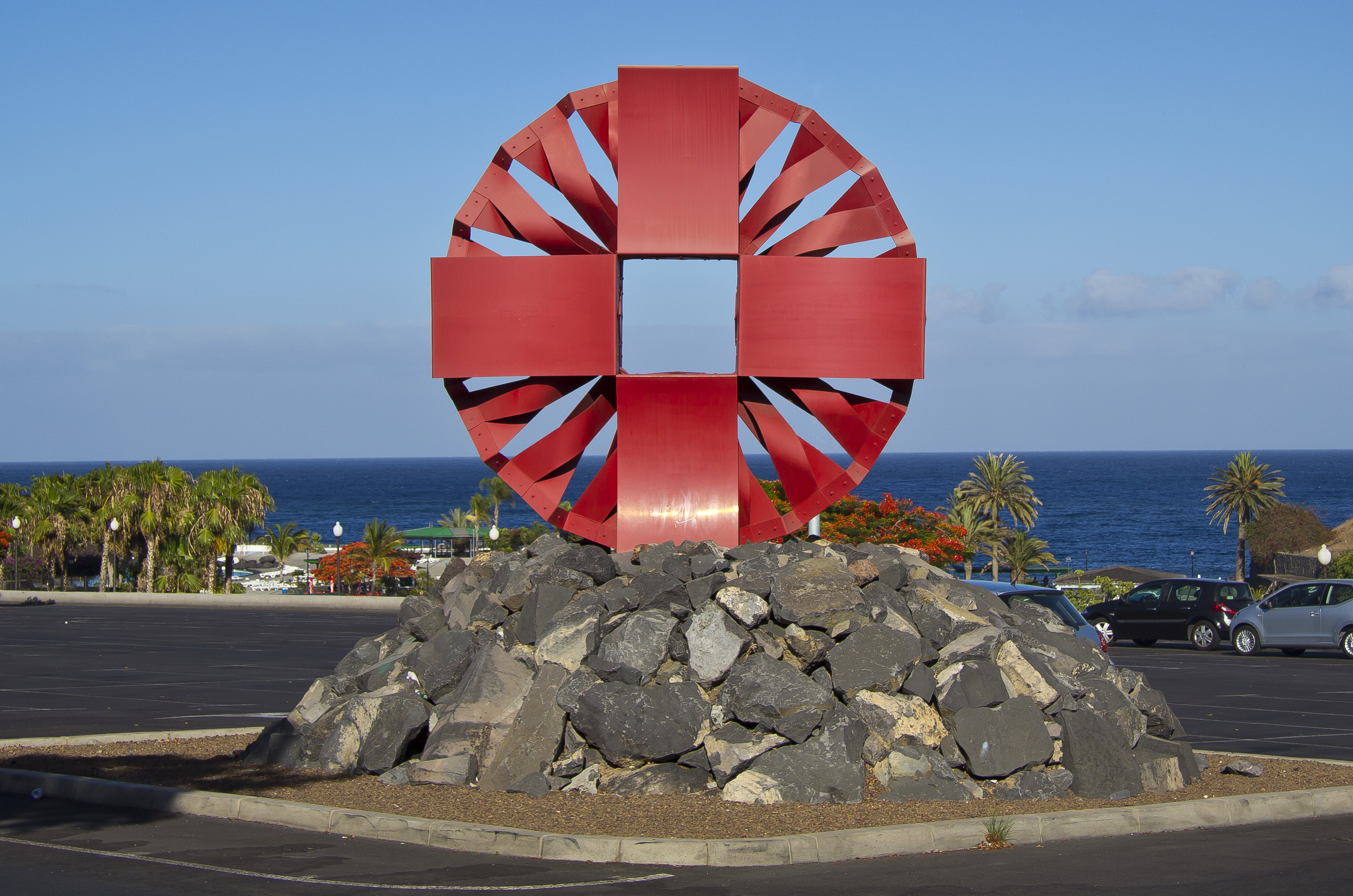
Sol rojo (1995), Santa Cruz de Tenerife, Spain

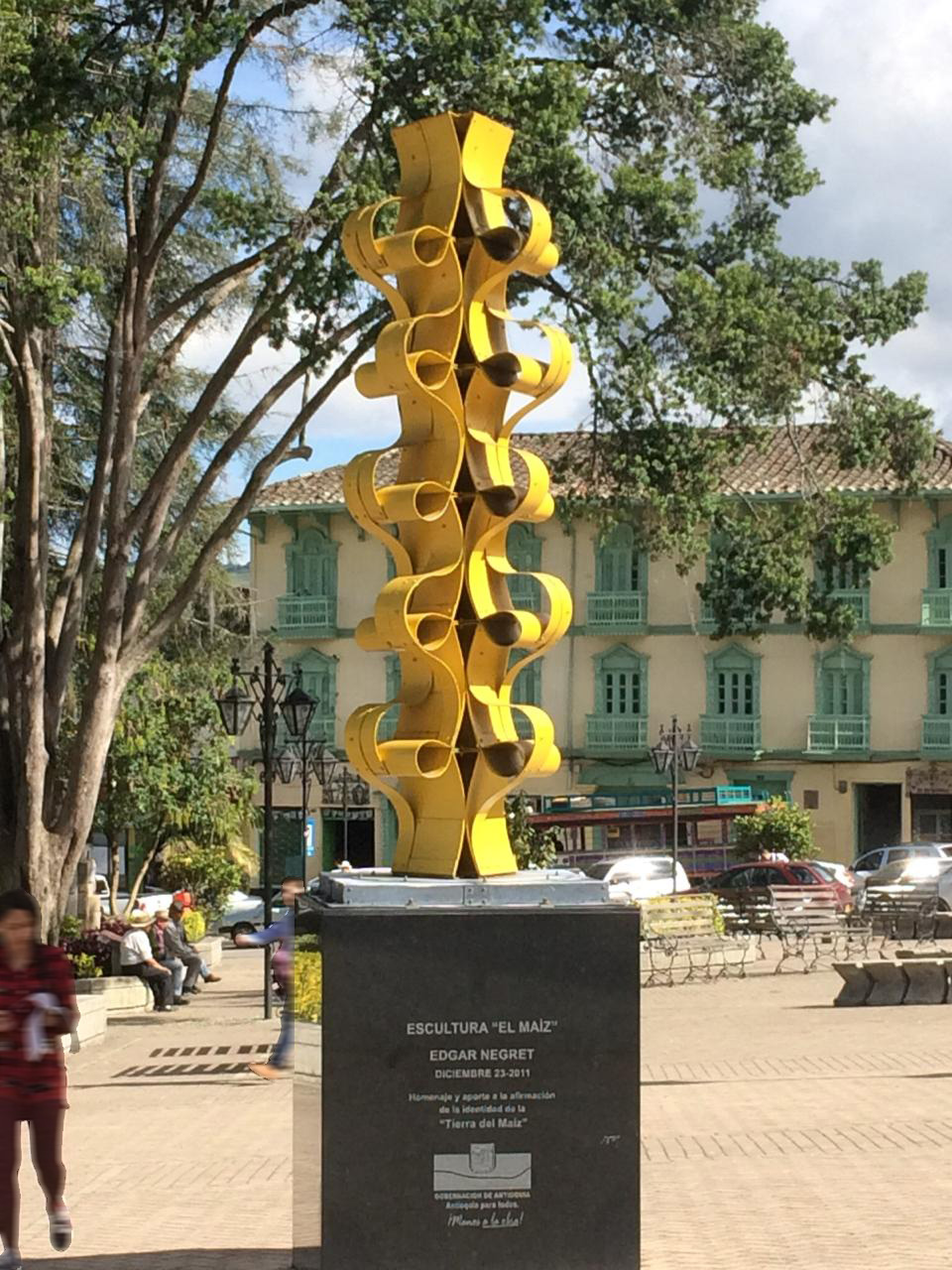
El Maíz (1996), Sonsón, Colombia

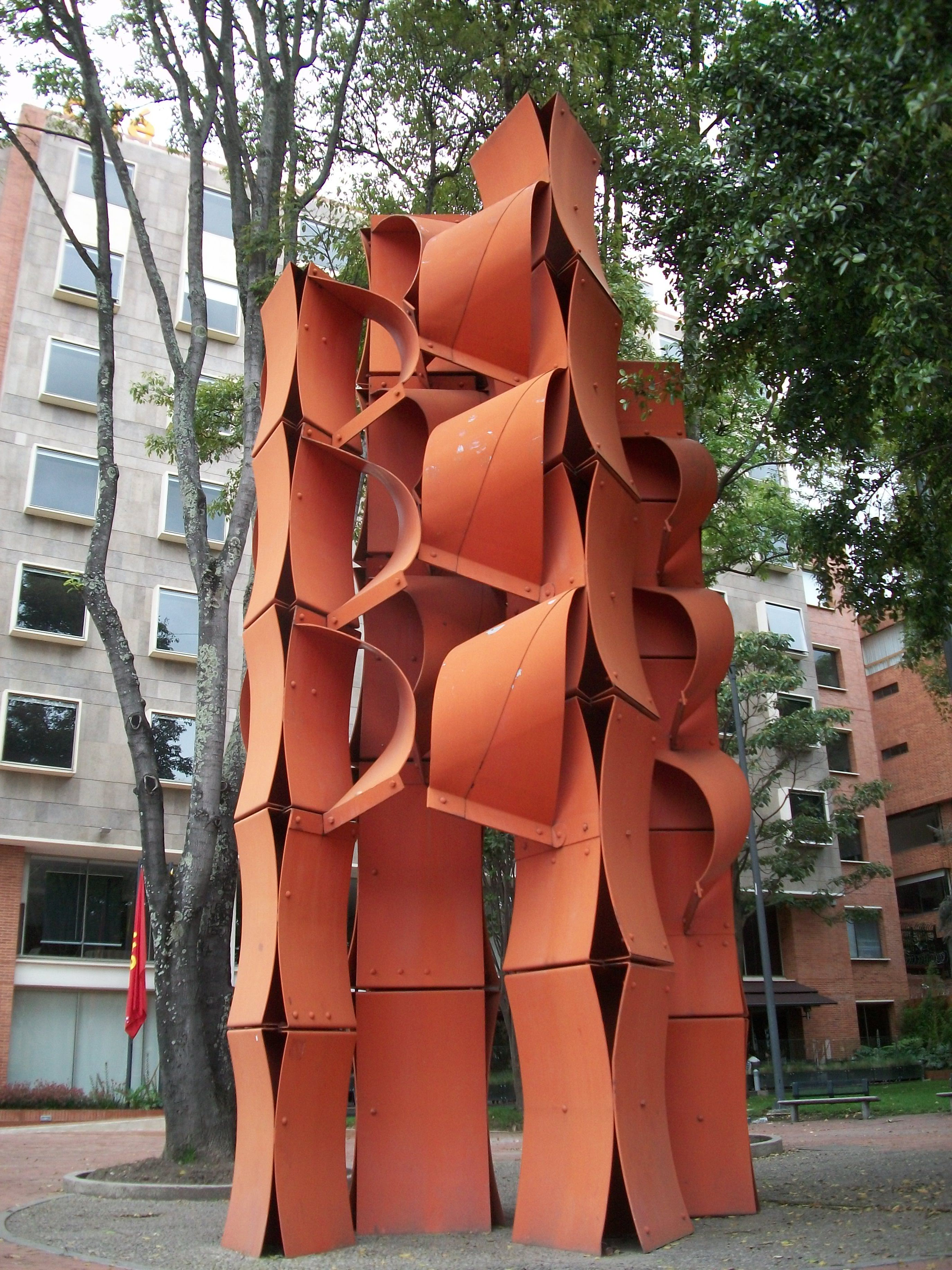
La gran cascada (2000), Bogotá, Colombia

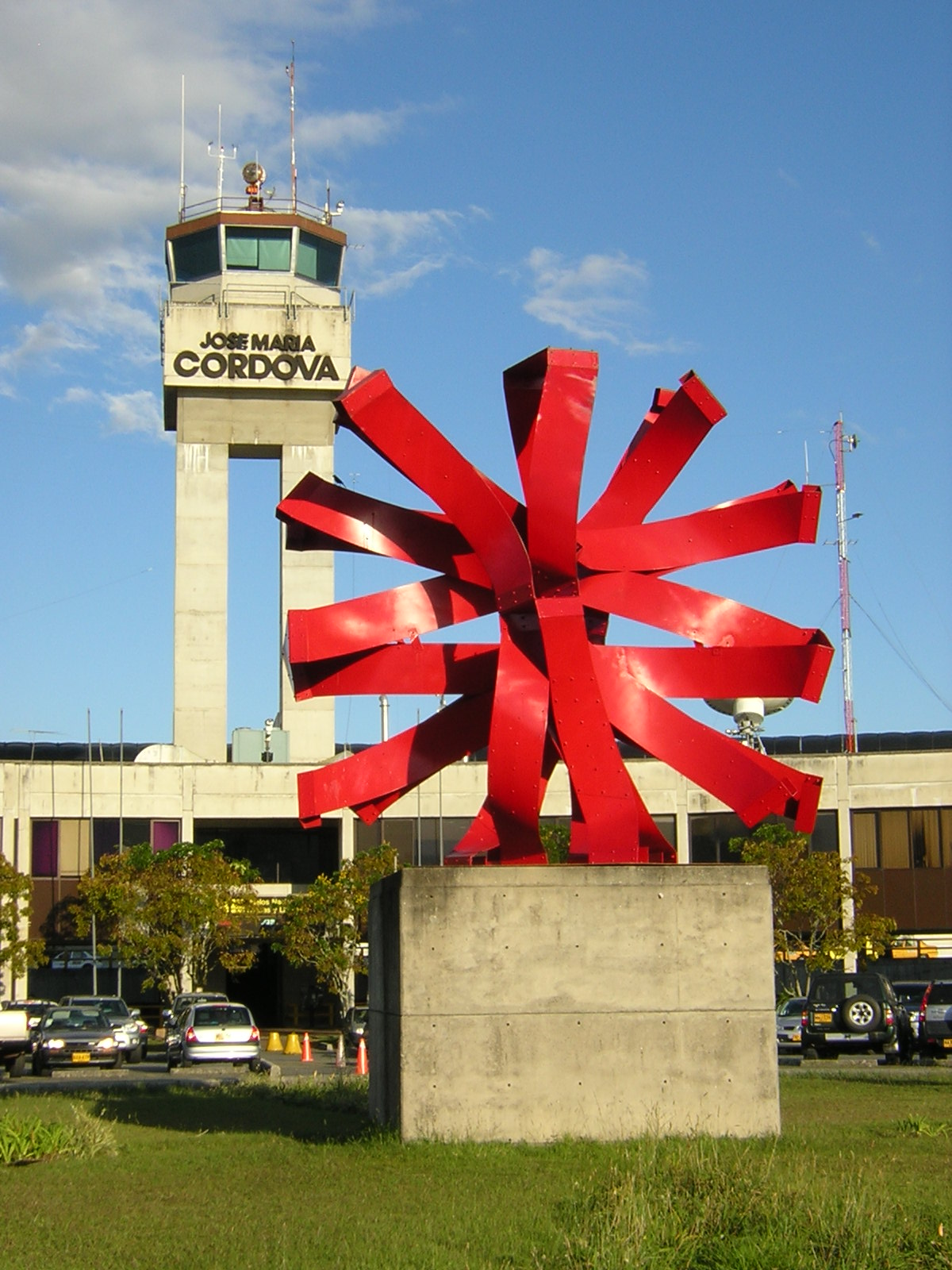
El sol (2005), Rionegro, Colombia

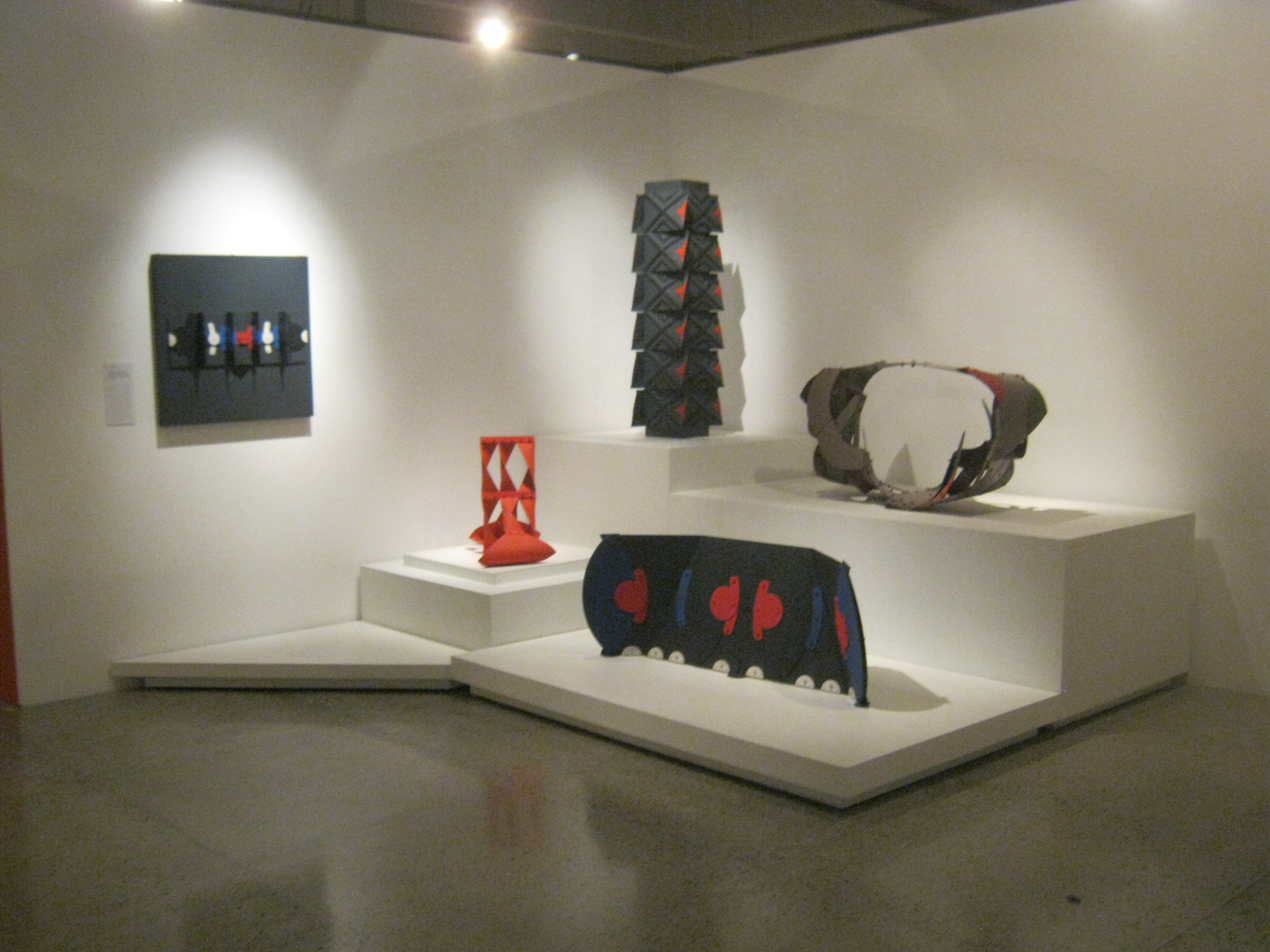
Various sculptures by Édgar Negret in La Tertulia Museum

== Selected works ==
- Sign for an Aquarium (Model) (1954), painted iron, Museum of Modern Art, New York City
- Aparato Mágico (1959), painted aluminium and wood, Art Museum of the Americas, Washington D.C.
- Acoplamiento (1966), bolted and painted aluminium, Bogotá Museum of Modern Art, Bogotá D.C.
- Edificio (1967), painted aluminium, Miguel Urrutia Art Museum, Bogotá
- The Bridge (Homage to Paul Foster) (1968), painted aluminum, Rhode Island School of Design Museum, Providence
- Escalera (1972), painted aluminium, La Tertulia Museum, Cali
- Navegante (1972), painted metal, Museum of Contemporary Art of Bogotá, Bogotá
- Máscara (1974), painted aluminium and wood construction, Centro Cultural Banco do Brasil, Rio de Janeiro
- Sol (1985), painted aluminium, Inter-American Development Bank, Washington D.C.
- Cascada (1988), painted bronze, Bank of Spain, Madrid
- Anudamiento (1990), bolted sheet metal and paint, Casa de Nariño, Bogotá
- Navegantes (1990), painted aluminum, Museum of Latin American Art, Long Beach
- Serpiente Emplumada (1993), bolted sheet metal and paint, La Tertulia Museum, Cali
- Lake-Direction (1995), bolted sheet metal and paint, Museum of Contemporary Art of Lima, Lima
- Casa de la Serpiente (1996), painted aluminium, Grupo Sura, Medellín
- Espacio Ritual (1996-2019), painted iron, Atchugarry Museum of Contemporary Art, Manantiales
