= El Maíz =

Series of sculptures by Édgar Negret

El Maiz is a series of modern abstract sculptures by Édgar Negret as an interpretation of the maize, or corn. The sculptures, which are all in the same design and production year, vary in color, material, and size. The sculptures are more commonly found in yellow which is also the most common color for the corn crop; however, some were painted purple and red which are also natural colors in which the maize crop can be found in.

== Locations ==
- Art Museum of the Americas, Washington D.C. - artist donation
- Ruiz y Zapata Plaza, Sonsón - artist donation
- Odinsa Art Collection, Bogotá

== Gallery ==
El maíz (1996), painted steel, 9.6 x 1 meters, Washington D.C.

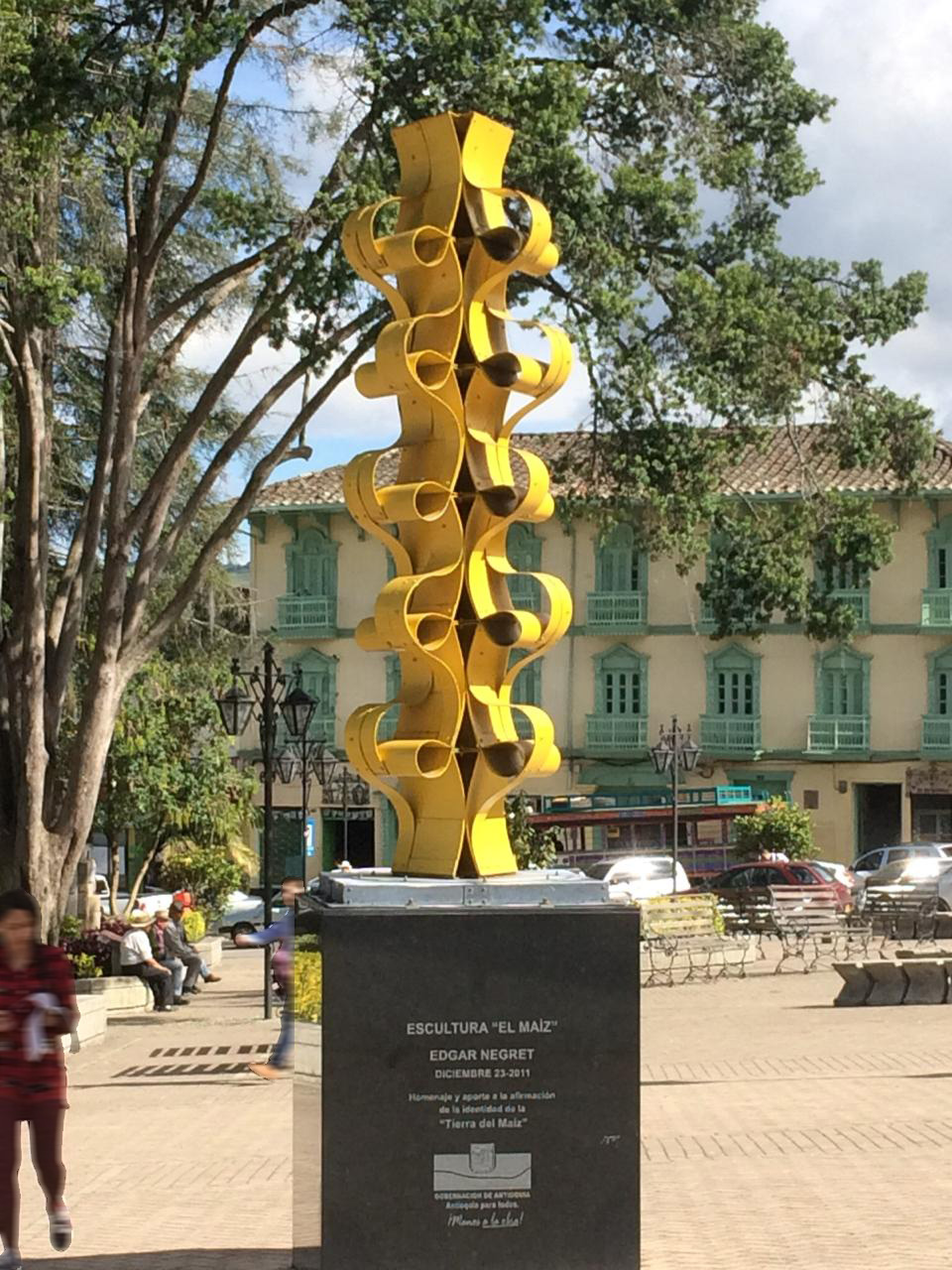
El maíz (1996), painted aluminium, Sonsón

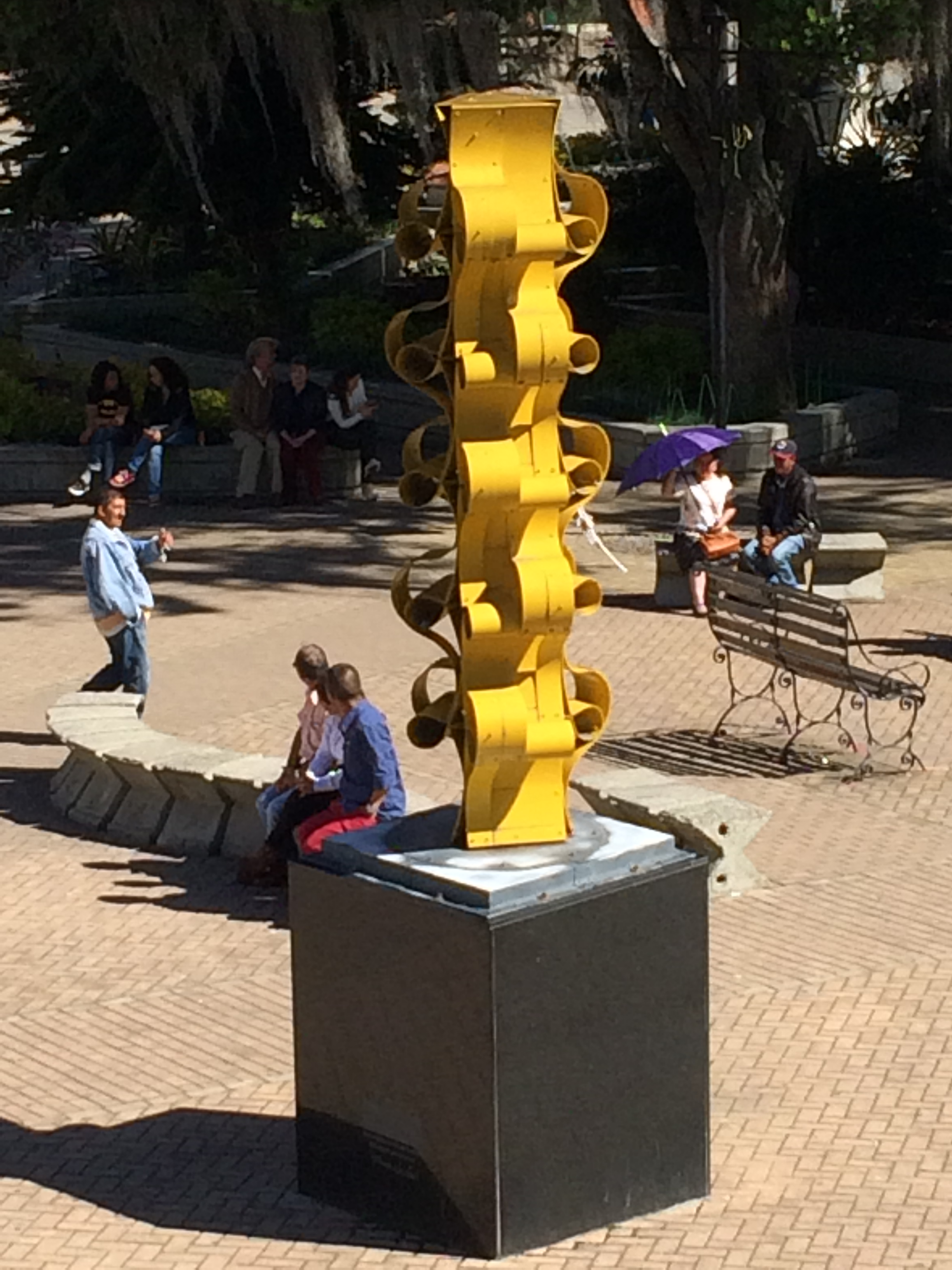
El maíz (1996), painted aluminium, Sonsón

== See also ==
- Environmental art
- Food art
