= Jesús María Espinosa =

Jesus Maria Espinosa
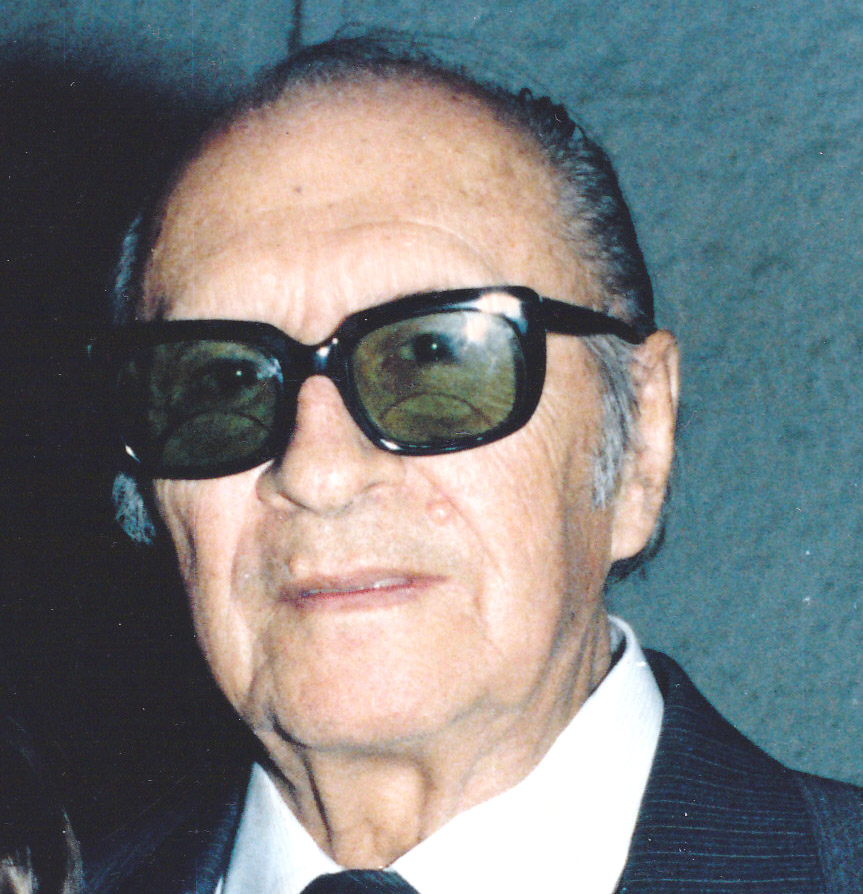
- Picture of J.M. Espinosa 1980's
- Born: August 10, 1908; Belalcazar, Cauca, Colombia
- Died: July 14, 1995 (aged 86); Santiago de Cali
- Website: www.facebook.com/JesusMariaEspinosa

Jesús María Espinosa Fernández (1908–1995) was a Colombian painter. He was born in the town of Belalcázar, in the Department of Cauca, Colombia on August 10, 1908.

He painted in several genres and techniques but mostly an impressionism style was seen in his works. Among his most important achievements was the creation of the first Visual Arts School of Painting in the city of Cali, Colombia. This school is currently part of the 'Instituto Departamental de Bellas Artes'.

== Biography ==
Jesús María was a descendant of José María Espinosa (1796–1883), a painter and miniaturist known for his portraits of Antonio Nariño and of Simón Bolivar. As a youngster, Espinosa's paternal grandfather taught him how to paint; supported by him, Espinosa figured out a way to extract pigments from vegetables in order to give color to his first paintings.

He was educated in the city of Popayán, Colombia and then began his formal study of painting at the Escuela de Bellas Artes, in the capital Bogotá. He took lessons from art teacher Roberto Pizano (1896–1929). In 1929, he was awarded a scholarship by the Colombian government and traveled to Paris to continue his studies in painting at the prestigious Académie Julian, under the direction of Paul Albert Laurens (1870–1934). During his years in Paris he had a very good friendship with Kees van Dongen (1877-1968) one the best portraitists in Paris at the time and with Russian artist Andre Petroff.

When he returned to Colombia in 1933, he set up a small academy in the city of Cali. He knew composer Antonio Maria Valencia (1902–1952) who suggested that Espinosa move his small academy of painting to the newly founded Cali's School of Fine Arts; then Espinosa founded the Visual Arts School in 1934, created by Resolution No 32 of the City Council, in the opposite street of the Municipal Theater of Cali, now occupied by Pro-Arts.

He started painting classes and later brought Gerardo Navia a sculptor from Palmira. Shortly after, Matjasic Roko a Yugoslav artist moves from Chile to our school to teach the classes of mural and color theory.

In the year 1939 the Fine Arts School of Music and Painting moved to the current location at the Centennial neighborhood.

He died in the city of Cali, Colombia in 1995 at the age of 86.

Espinosa is recognized nationally and internationally as an artist that mastered the technique of oil painting, and watercolor mural. Several of his disciples have emerged as important artists, including: Edgar Negret, Hernando Tejada, Otilia Hernandez, Labrada Bernardino, Hernando Polo, Daniel Romero, Luis Aragon, Gustavo Rojas, Marino Tenorio among others.

== Gallery ==
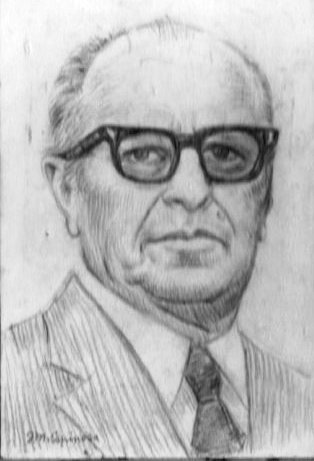
Self-portrait. Pencil

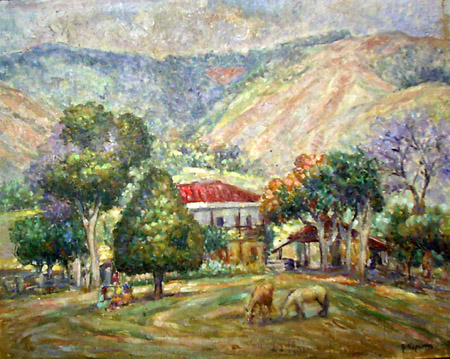
The Guabito. Oil

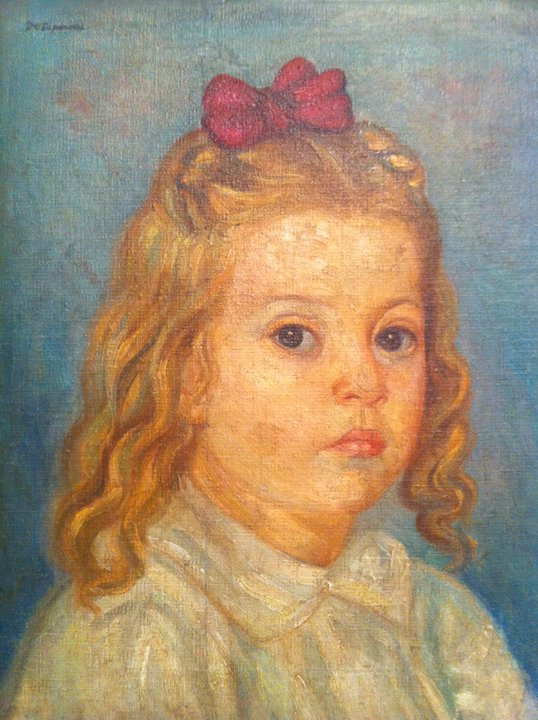
Luz Elvira Espinosa, daughter of the artist. Oil

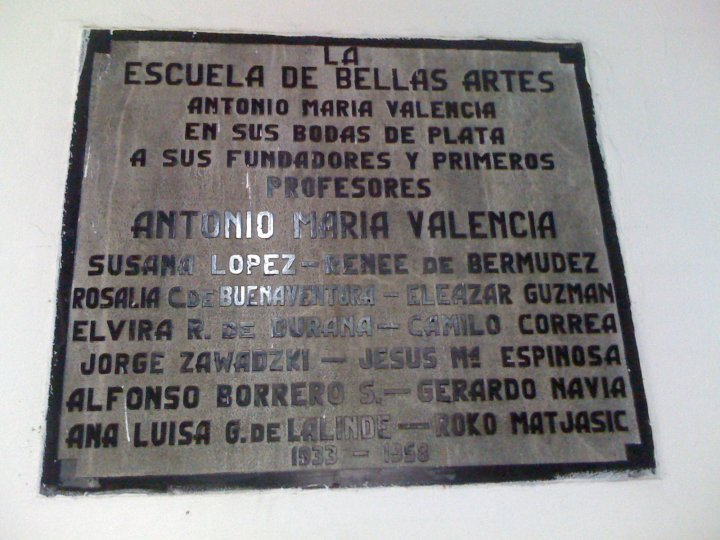
25 years, Commemorative Plaque with founders
