= Cali River =

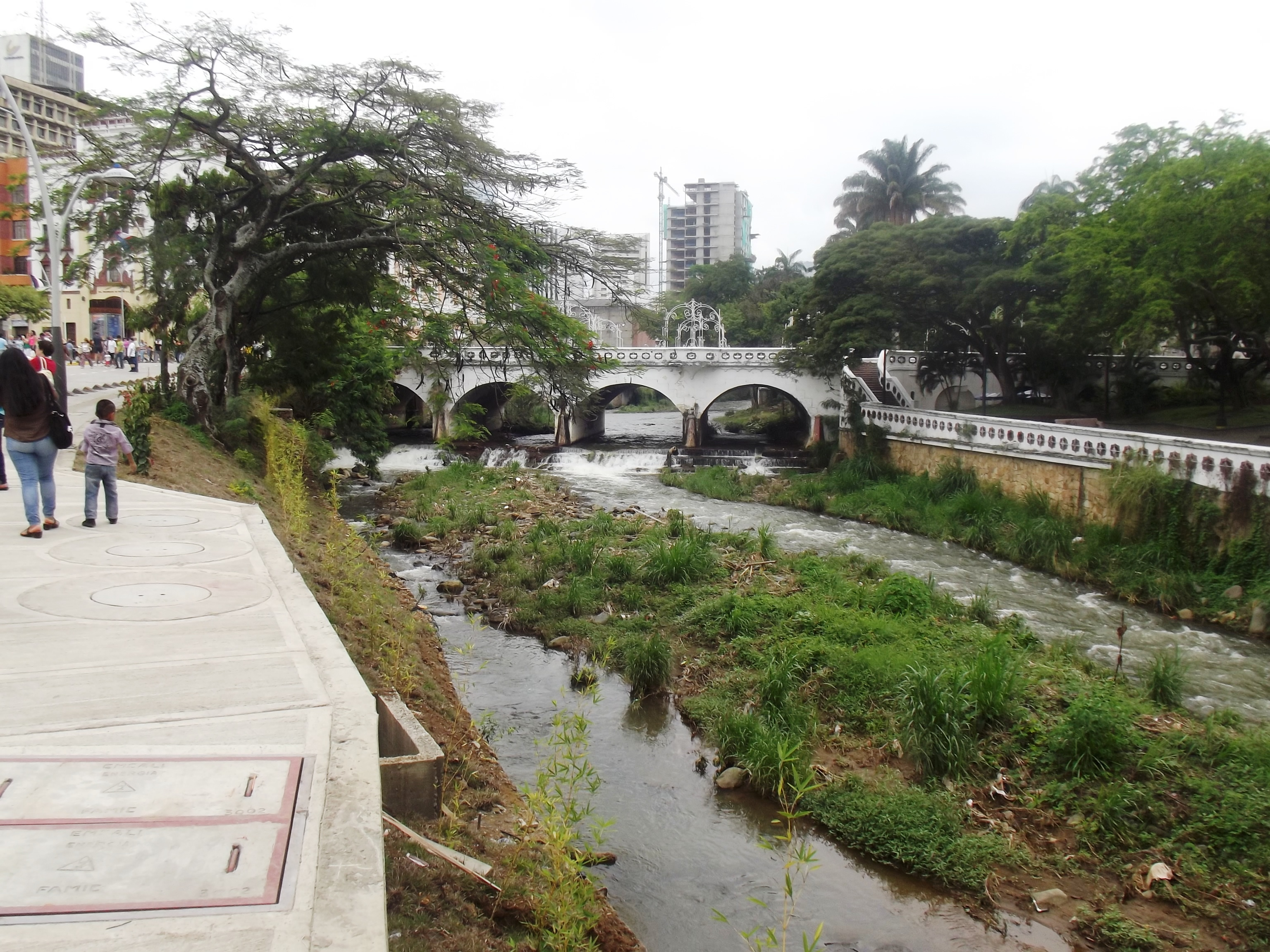
- Cali river flowing through Cali

Location
- Country: Colombia

Physical characteristics
- Source
  - location: Farallones de Cali
- Mouth: Cauca River
  - coordinates: 3°30′21″N 76°29′30″W
- Length: 50 km (31 mi)

The Cali River is a river of western Colombia. It flows through the city of Cali and drains into the Cauca River. Its headwaters are in the Farallones de Cali of the Cordillera Occidental.

== See also ==
- List of rivers of Colombia
