= La Tertulia Museum =

Art museum in Cali, Colombia

- Museo La Tertulia
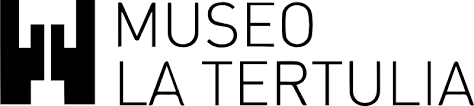

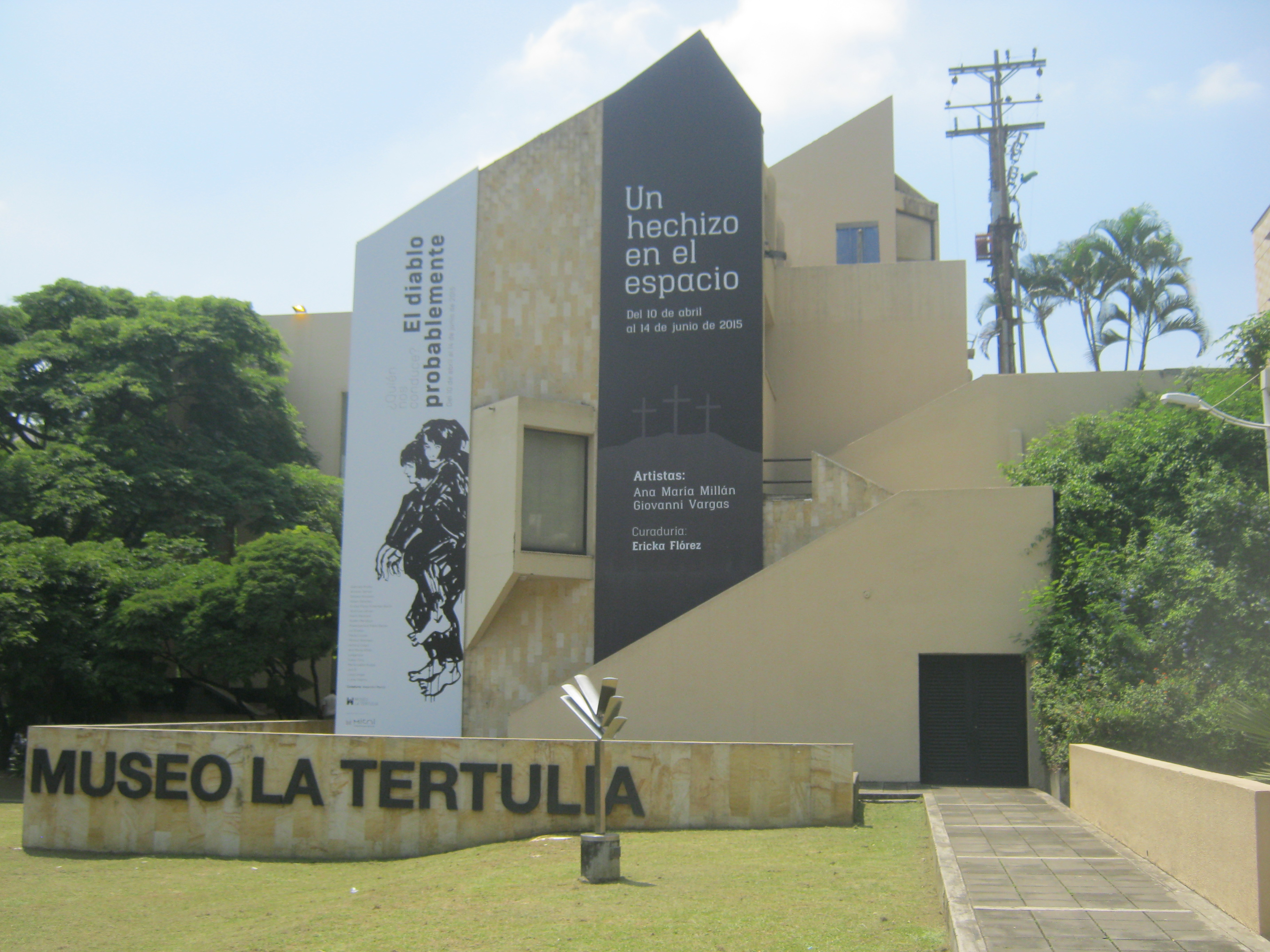
- Established: March 9, 1956; 70 years ago
- Location: Cali, Valle del Cauca, Colombia
- Coordinates: 3.4502°N 76.5453°W
- Type: Art museum
- Collection size: 2000
- Director: Ana Lucía Llano Domínguez
- Curator: Alejandro Martín Maldonado
- Architects: Manuel Lago Franco; Benjamín Barney Caldas
- Website: www.museolatertulia.com

La Tertulia Museum, formerly known as the Museum of Modern Art La Tertulia, is an art museum in Cali, Colombia. It has an important collection of American and especially Colombian art. The museum consists of three buildings: a main gallery with 300 works by national and international artists and an art workshop for children; an arthouse theater known as the Cinemateca; and a building for printing and restoration workshops.

The Cinemateca frequently hosts passing film festivals, such as EuroCine.

== Background ==
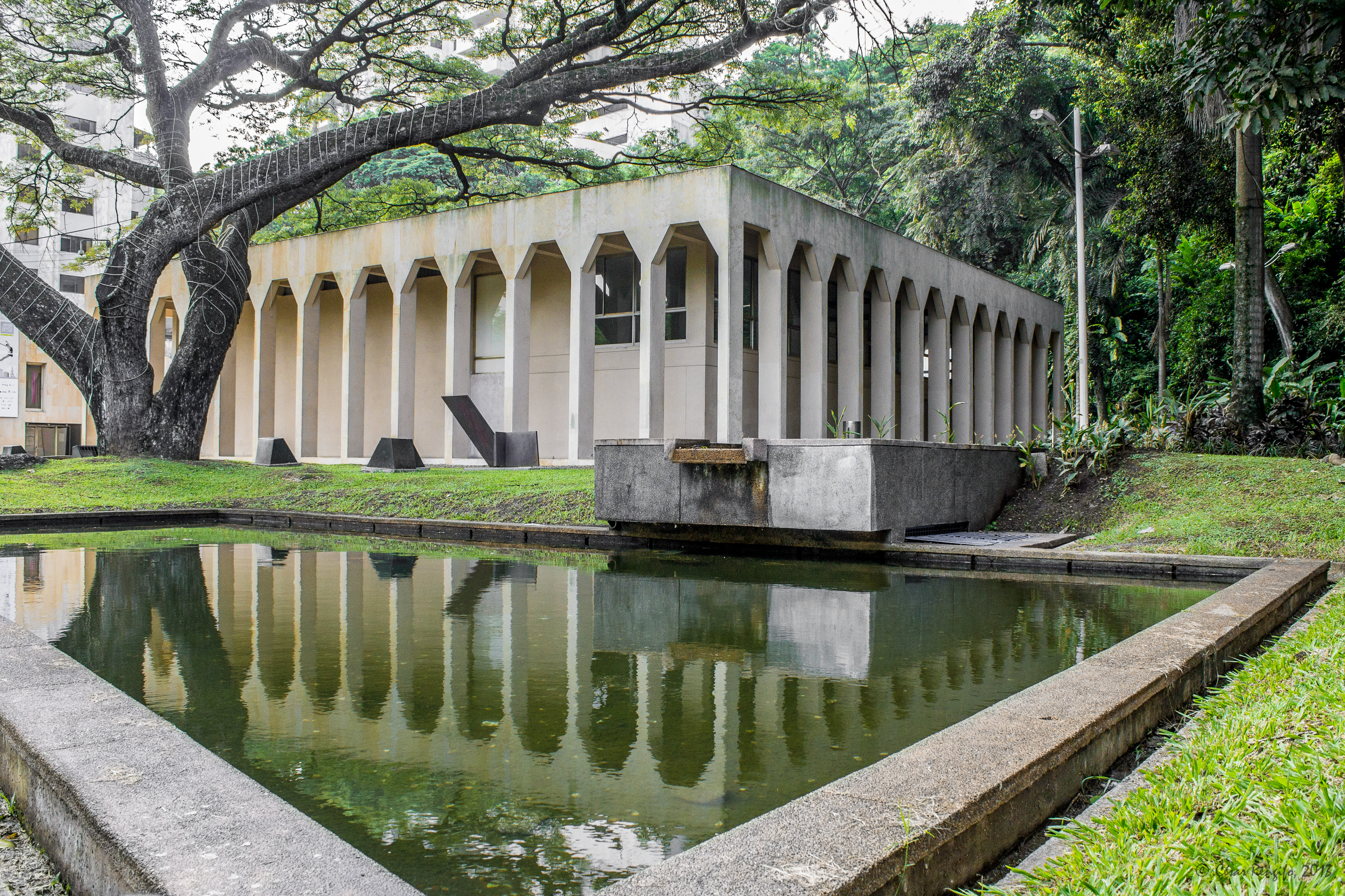
Main building housing the art gallery

A tertulia in Spanish refers to a social gathering, especially to talk about art or literature. The name of the museum comes from the history of its creation. During the dictatorship of General Gustavo Rojas Pinilla, the cultural activity in Cali fell markedly. The Municipal Theater of Cali was reduced to a movie theater, and the Institute of Fine Arts was used as a means of propaganda by the State. Due to this shortage of spaces, houses began to be improvised as cultural centers. Clara Inés Suárez, together with her husband, an ambassador in several countries, convinced several artists to visit the city. Clara Inés, together with Maritza Uribe from Urdinola, who managed another cultural center in her home, managed to establish a cultural group in the city.

On March 9, 1956, La Tertulia was founded in a house rented by the renowned journalist Alfonso Bonilla Aragón in Cra. 5 # 4-10 of the San Antonio neighborhood. The group went unnoticed by the state security bodies such as the DAS, who forbade this type of meetings. During the twelve years that the institution had as headquarters the house in the traditional neighborhood, in the mornings a private school operated, supported by the partners of the museum, and in the afternoons diverse works of local and foreign artists were presented, with which gradually increased the collection of the institution.

=== New building ===
The expansion and need for an exhibition hall led to the construction in 1968 of the Foundational Building on the banks of the Cali River, in the place known as El Charco del Burro.

== Collection ==
The museum collection includes a representative sample of different arts in the continent, from the mid-20th century to contemporary times, with more than 1,500 works acquired or donated.

== Gallery ==
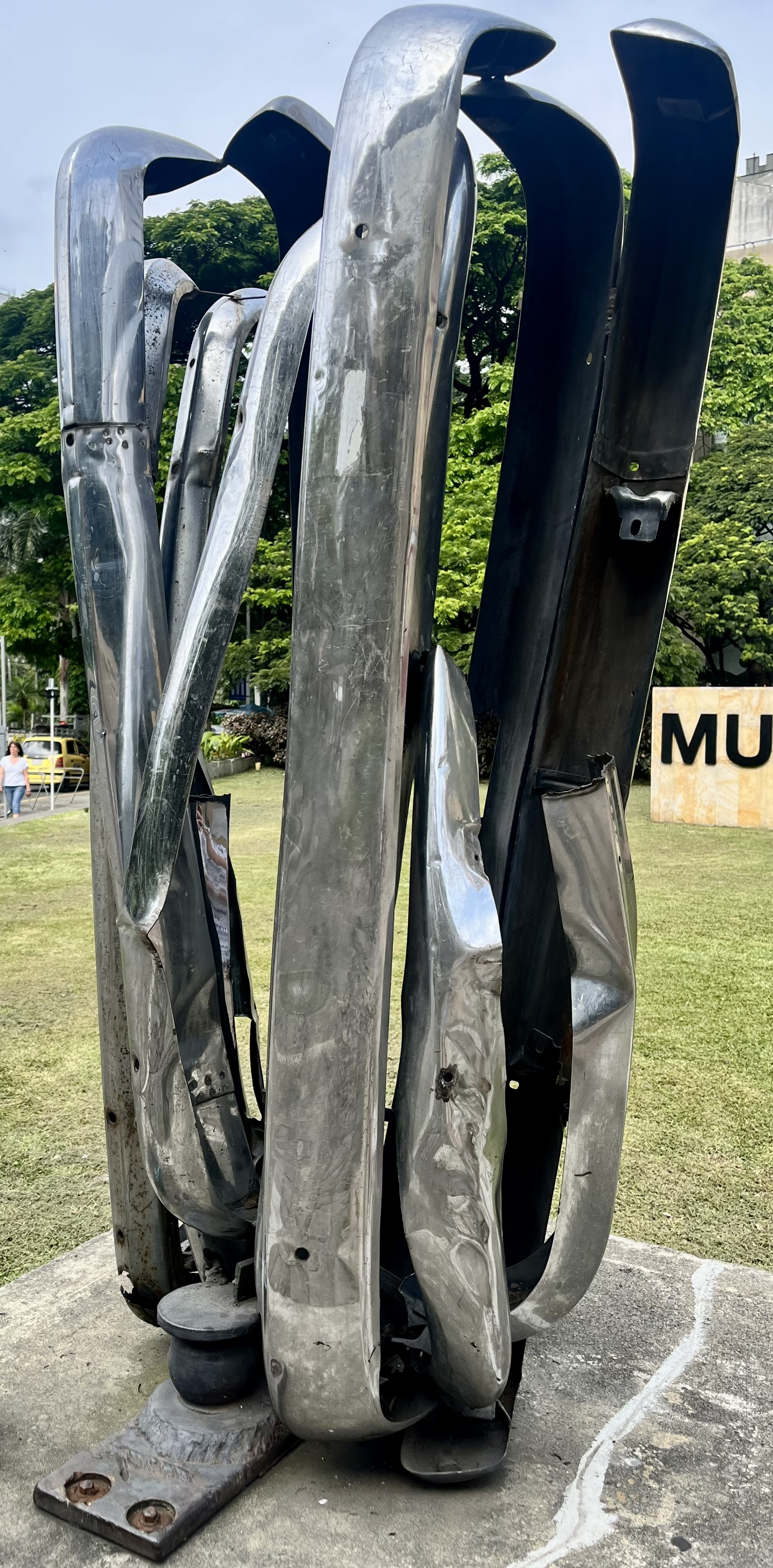
Flor (1975) by Feliza Bursztyn

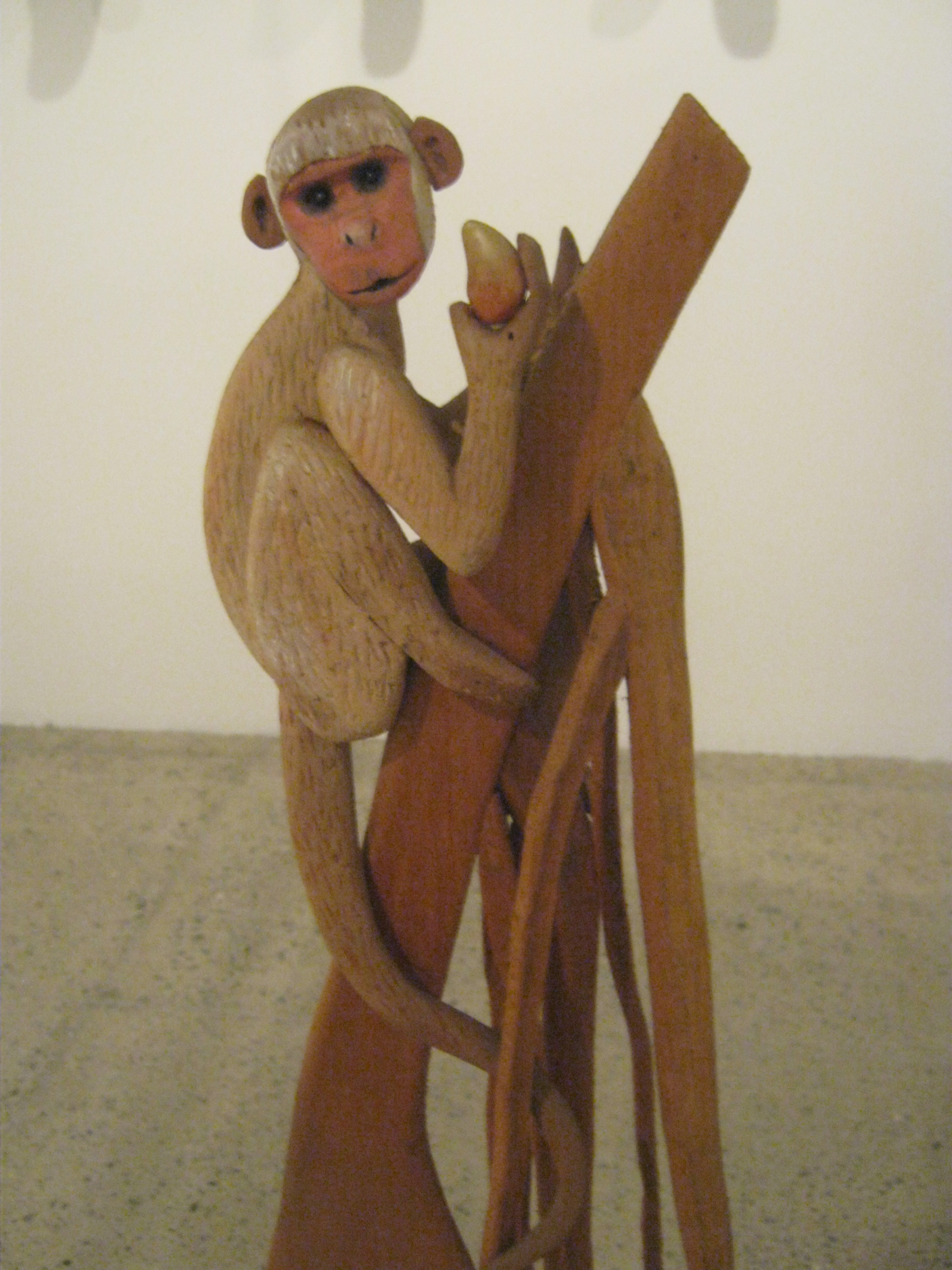
Manglar del mico by Hernando Tejada

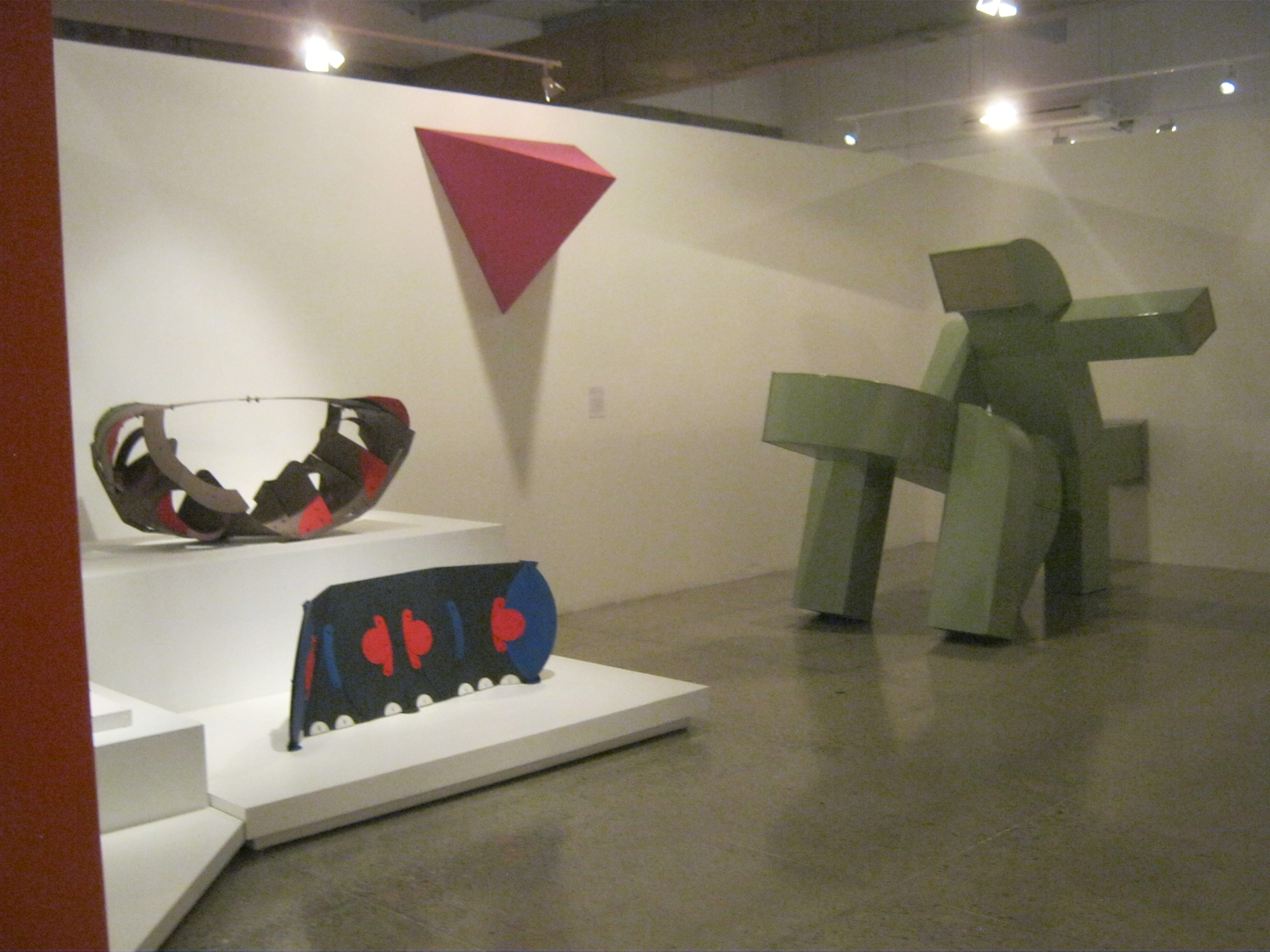
Serpiente emplumada by Edgard Negret (left) and Dotación para museo en vías de extensión by Elías Heim (right)

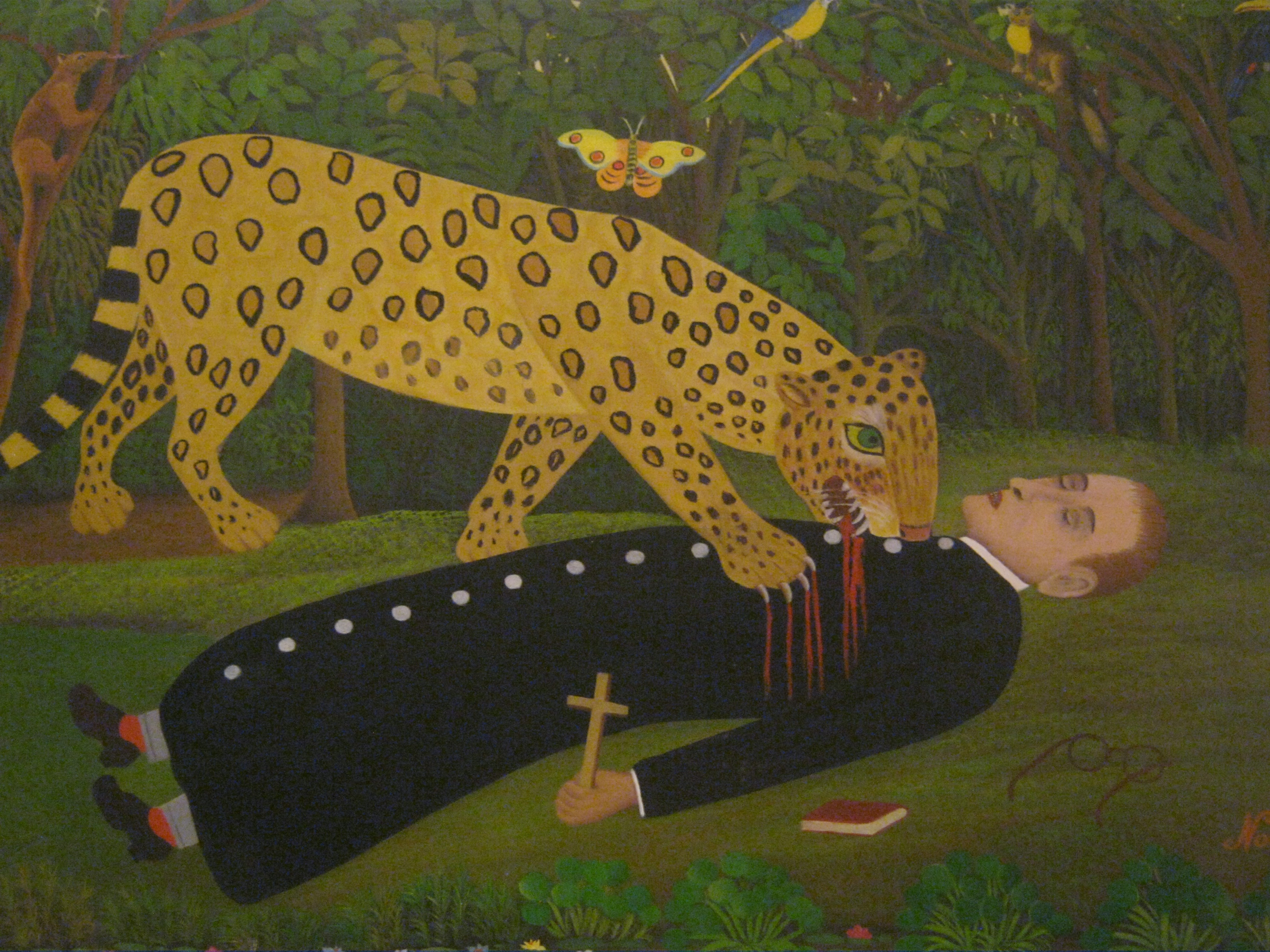
Misionero Comido por Tigre by Noé León
