= Alonso Turrillo de Yebra =

Spanish 17th-century military engineer

Captain Alonso Turrillo de Yebra
- Occupations: Military, Architect, Superintendent Captaincy & Governor
- Era: 16th century
- Known for: Cartagena & Santa Fé Mint
- Title: 1° Treasurer of Santa Fe, New Kingdom of Granada
- Successor: Antonio Vergara Azcárate y Dávila
- Spouse: Maria de Vergara Azcárate

Alonso Turrillo de Yebra was a Spanish military engineer and architect, at the service of the kings Felipe II, Felipe III and Felipe IV. Turrillo became the first royal treasurer of Madrid in 1607 and later arrived to the new Kingdom of Granada in 1621 with a royal order that accredited him to create the first Mint of Casa de la Moneda or Casa de Moneda is Spanish for mint (coin) (literally, house of money) in the New Kingdom of Granada. Turrillo became the first royal treasurer of Santafe de Bogotá.

Turillo was an official in Cartagena de Indias and, Superintendent Captain of the Spanish Empire.

== Biography ==
de Yerba studied mathematics and, in 1596 became an assistant to the engineer Cristóbal de Rojas, with whom he drew up plans in Gibraltar and carried out various works until 1598, the year in which he went to Portugal by order of the Council of War. He was under the orders of Leonardo Turriano, senior engineer of that kingdom, Turrillo carried out the plans and works for the construction of the San Antonio fort, as well as repairs of its port.

In 1607 he was at court, where he was entrusted with the plans for the construction of the Casa de la Moneda del Pósito in Madrid. In 1611 he was proposed to go to Milan. As a consequence of his well-earned fame as an architect, in 1613 the Duke of Uceda asked him to build a palace for him at Court, a palace that ended in 1619 and was highly criticized at the time for its 'strange novelty'. In 1618 he carried out the project of stakes to close the bar of La Mamora (current Moroccan city of Mehdía).

His experience in the construction of buildings for the crown or the nobility would motivate him to be sent to Santa Fe de Bogotá, in the New Kingdom of Granada, in 1620 to build a Mint there. In this regard, according to the Royal Decree issued in Madrid on June 10, 1620.

Turrillo set out for Santa Fe with various officials, personal belongings, tools, and instruments for the work of the currency. It is known that there are coins of 8 reales minted in Cartagena of the year 1621, which had to be made sometime between August and no later than December of that year.

By Royal Decree of 24 August 1626 addressed to Diego de Escobar, Governor of Cartagena, the authorisation for the minting of vellón coins was rescinded, authorising the minting of silver coins, but restricted to the values of 1/4, 1/2, 1 and 2 reales. Minting began that year in Cartagena, and despite not having authorization, gold was also chipped. Due to this, by order of the Santa Fe audience it was closed in 1629. Later, the Spanish monarch ordered its reopening in 1630, lifting the restriction. The mint minted gold and silver coins of the macuquina type with very rough workmanship until 1635, when it was closed by Royal Decree.

Given the endemic problem of lack of drinking water in Havana, one of the various systems used consisted of transporting water from the Almendares or Chorrera rivers through ditches or pipes that avoided the cumbersome and slow system used until then. However, it was not easy to carry it out, since, as was the case in many cases, jurisdictional and administrative problems delayed it until 1566, when the fortification master, Francisco de Colona, began the work called La Zanja. Alonso Turrillo intervened in the work in 1623, needing to repair the Chorrera dam, because with 'the strong storms and floods it has broken a lot of ground and is exposed to dangerous floods'.

In 1625 went to Cádiz, where he received the order to go to the port of La Mamora in order to study the possible closure of his bar, a commission from which Turrillo excused himself, citing his many obligations. Finally, in 1629 he was ordered to go to Cartagena de Indias, for everything appropriate to its fortification, for which he had to embark on the navy of D. Fadrique de Toledo. Between 1631 and 1634 he held the position of governor of the province of Antioquia and it seems that he was the first to introduce a carriage in Bogotá.

His relative, Antonio de Vergara Azcárate inherited the title of Treasurer and took over the royal job for 50 years.

== Military Museum of Colombia ==
The museum was founded by the military engineer Turrillo Yebra Alonso in the seventeenth century.

It houses the art collection of coins and Bank of the Republic. In 1975 it was declared a national monument. The property of Calle de la Esperanza No. 4-92 passed to Antonio Ricaurte, courageous and brave captain who enlisted in the Patriot Army in 1813 by the request of The Liberator Simón Bolívar, in the fight for freedom.

Colonial Treasurers Casa de la Moneda - Mint House of Coin of Santafe
| Founded (1620-1683)Alonso Turrillo de Yebra | (1637–1683) Antonio de Vergara Azcárate |
