= The Misanthrope (Bruegel) =

Painting by Pieter Bruegel the Elder

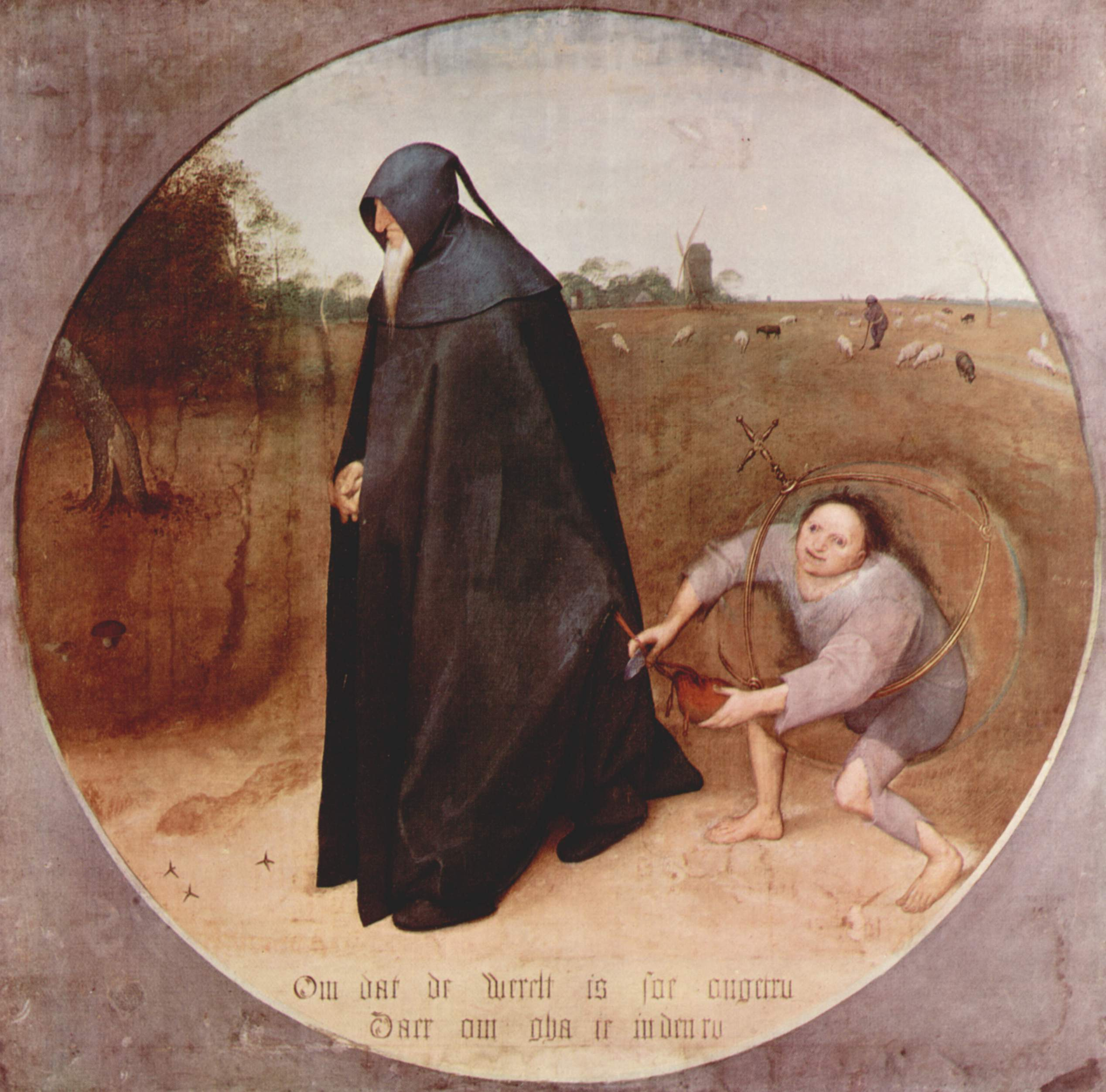
- Artist: Pieter Bruegel the Elder
- Year: 1568, signed and dated on the painted frame
- Medium: Tempera on canvas
- Dimensions: 86 cm × 85 cm (34 in × 33 in)
- Location: National Museum of Capodimonte, Naples

The Misanthrope is a tempera painting on canvas by the Flemish Renaissance artist Pieter Bruegel the Elder, created in 1568. It is now in the National Museum of Capodimonte, in Naples.

== Description ==
The circular painting is encased in a square frame and depicts a black-robed, white-bearded elderly man clasping his hands before him. A smaller barefooted man behind him uses a knife to cut the strings to the elderly man's moneypouch. The elderly man appears so lost in thought that he notices neither the theft nor the caltrops that lie in his path. A globus cruciger encloses the thief. A Flemish inscription at the bottom reads:

Om dat de werelt is soe ongetru / Daer om gha ic in den ru
("Because the world is perfidious, I am going into mourning").

== Interpretation ==
The hooded misanthrope is being robbed by the small figure in the glass globe who is holding his purse. That figure may be a symbol of vanity, although the religious symbolism inherent in the globe lends itself to other interpretations. Other symbolism in the painting portrays how impossible it is for his actions to lead to giving up the world. The misanthrope also is walking unaware toward caltrops set for him by the world (cast in his path). He cannot renounce the world as he would wish and he is contrasted with the shepherd in the background, who guards his sheep and who is more virtuous than the misanthrope because of his simple, honourable performance of his duties and his sense of responsibility toward his charges.

=== The Misanthrope by Pieter Bruegel the Younger ===
The Misanthrope
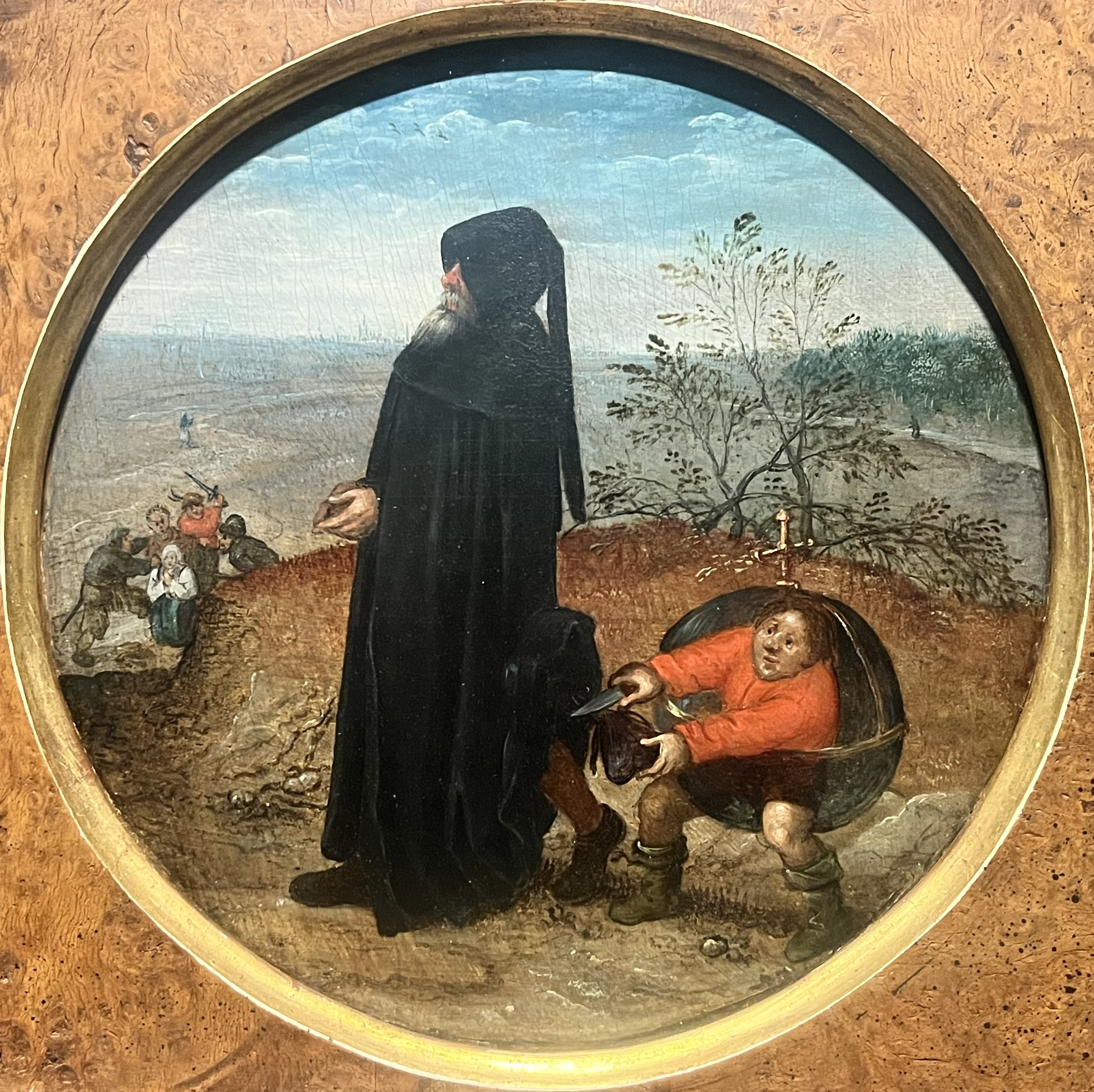
- Artist: Pieter Bruegel the Younger
- Year: c. 1600
- Medium: Tempera on canvas
- Dimensions: 30.2 cm × 30.2 cm (11.9 in × 11.9 in)
- Location: Museo Casa de Moneda, Bogotá

The Misanthrope also refers to a tempera painting on canvas by the Flemish Renaissance artist Pieter Bruegel the Younger who is known for creating multiple copies of his father's work. This is a slightly different composition. It is part of the Bank of the Republic of Colombia's permanent art collection, having been accessioned in 1999, and since August 2023 it is exhibited at the Museo Casa de Moneda in Bogotá, Colombia.

== See also ==
- List of paintings by Pieter Bruegel the Elder
