= Mesuno Treasure =

Gold coin hoard found in Colombia

Coordinates: 5.262971°N 74.726854°W

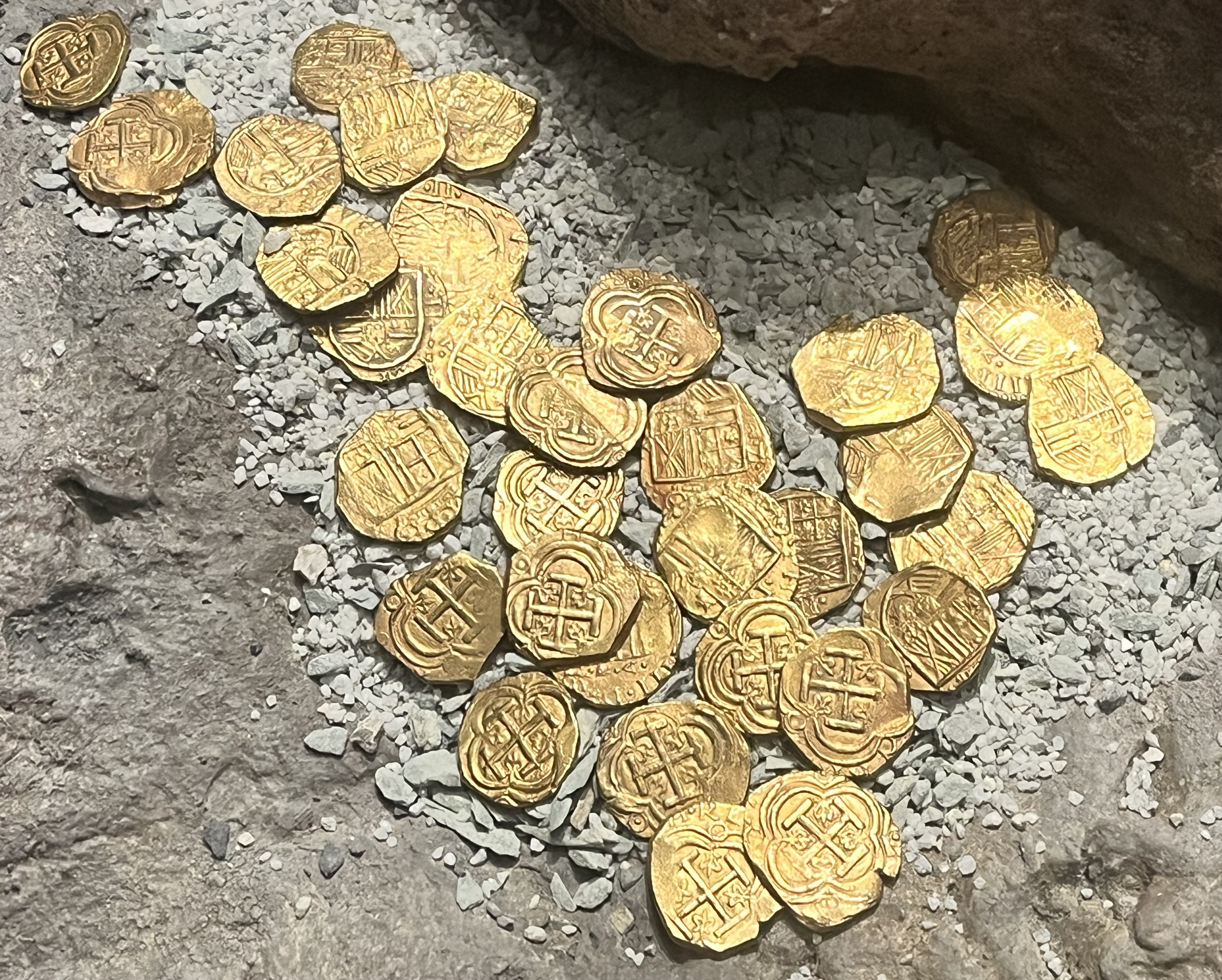
- A sample of the treasure on public display
- Type: Coin hoard
- Material: Gold
- Size: ~1,600 coins
- Created: 1627 to 1636
- Period/culture: New Kingdom of Granada, Spanish Empire
- Discovered: 22 August 1936; 89 years ago El Mesuno Islet, Honda, Tolima, Colombia
- Discovered by: Domingo Guzmán
- Present location: Room 1, Museo Casa de Moneda, Bogotá D.C. (~500 coins)

The Mesuno Treasure, or Mesuno Hoard, is the name given to a gold hoard of around 1,600 macuquina pistole coins that were discovered on El Mesuno Islet near Honda, Colombia. The hoard was discovered by Domingo Guzmán, a local fisherman, on 22 August 1936.

Around 500 pieces of the Mesuno Treasure are preserved by the Bank of the Republic, the central bank of Colombia, and exhibited at the Museo Casa de Moneda as part of the bank's numismatics collection.

== Discovery ==
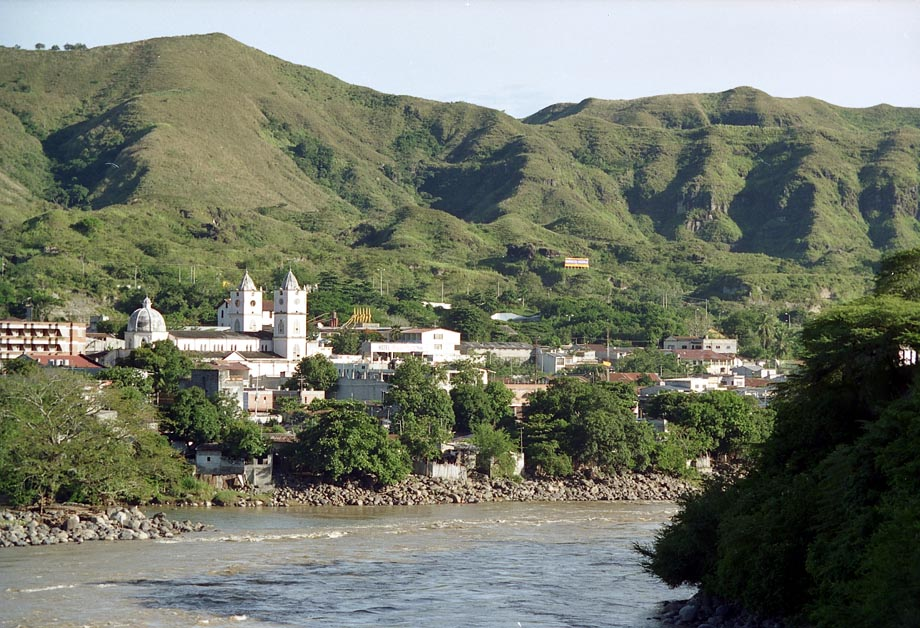
The town of Honda with the Magdalena River in the foreground

The hoard was discovered on El Mesuno, an islet on the Magdalena River, about six kilometers (3.7 mi) from the town of Honda in Colombia on 22 August 1936. Artisianal fisherman Domingo Gúzman was checking on his fishing lines when he noticed a glistening object partially buried on the edge of the river island and entered to retrieve the item. Gúzman proceeded to pull a small iron box which contained approximately 1,600 gold pistole coins. Gúzman pocketed some of the coins to show his brothers, Aristóbulo and Jorge Gúzman, who were also fishing in the area and re-buried the box.

Domingo Gúzman, having returned with Aristóbulo and Jorge, where he had reburied the box on El Mesuno islet proceeded to divide the treasure amongst the three of them.

== Historical background ==
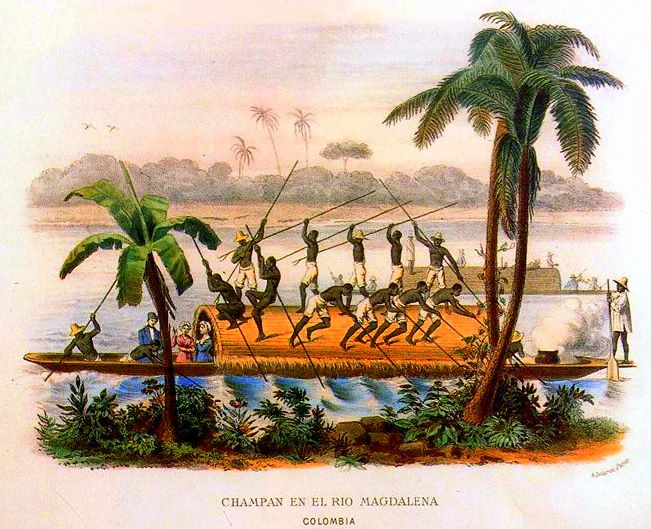
Champán on the Magdalena, c. 1860, by Ramón Torres Méndez

During the Spanish colonization of the Americas, the Magdalena River was the main transport link between Bogotá and the Caribbean Sea port of Cartagena de Indias; the town of Honda was an important stop between both cities and was the main embarkation and disembarkation point for champáns on the river.

In Bogotá, by orders of Philip III of Spain, the Santa Fé Mint hammered the first gold coins in the Americas and provided the currency needed to conduct trade and commerce in the New Kingdom of Granada.

It is widely accepted that the coins came from a champán which shipwrecked shortly after embarking in Honda carrying the hoard to either help finance the Castillo San Felipe de Barajas or transport it to Spain proper on a galleon ship from Cartagena.

=== Coins ===
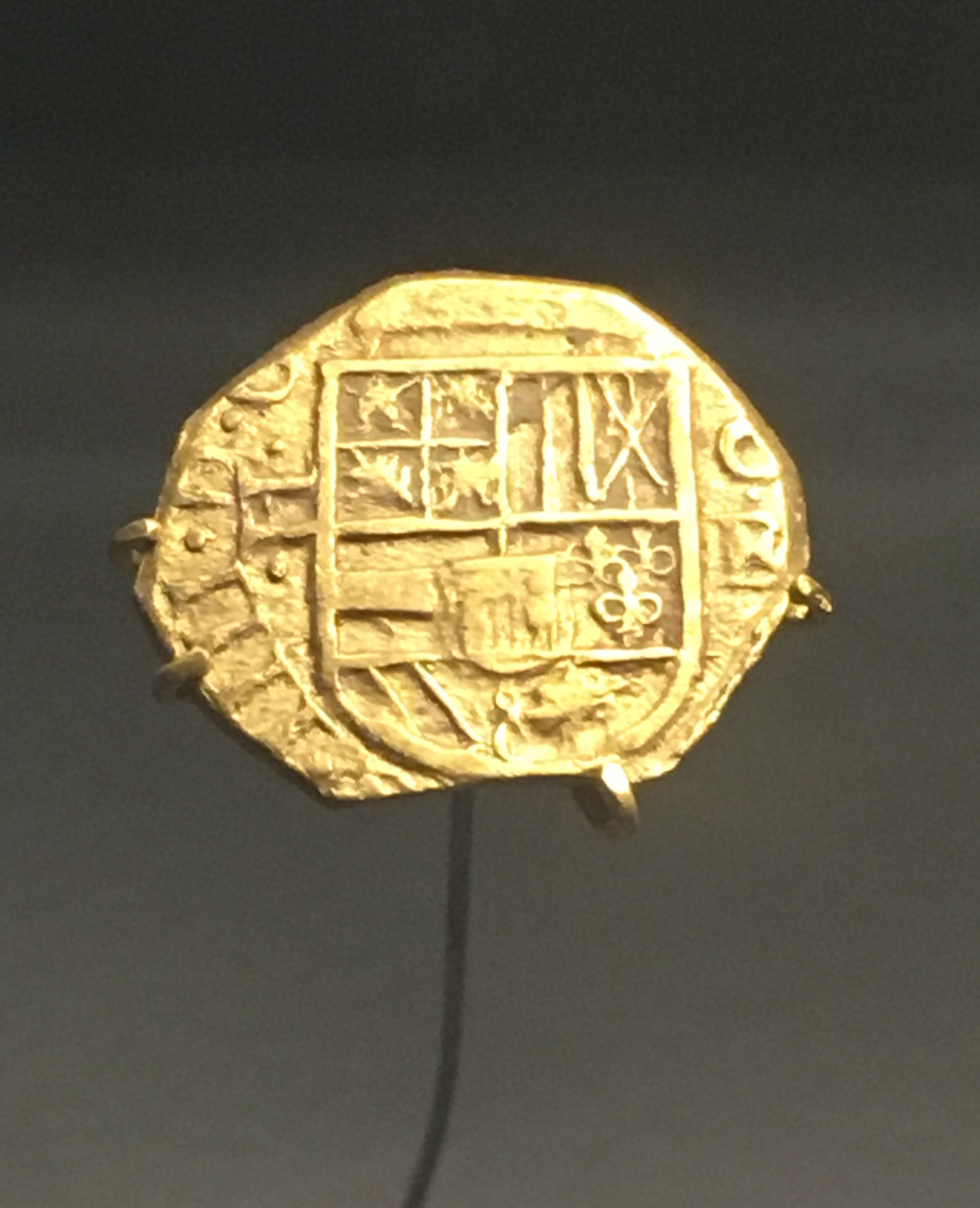
A 1630 Felipe IV doubloon on its reverse

The entirety of the hoard was composed by about 1,600 gold escudo coins with a denomination of 2. The 2 gold escudo coins, also known as doubloons or pistoles, were minted with a weight of about 6.77 grams (0.239 oz) and had a diameter of about 27 millimeters (1.1 in). The coins were minted with 22 karat gold.

The coins, on the obverse, depict the Jerusalem cross within a quatrefoil tressure which itself is decorated with four fleur-de-lis flowers. The legend of the coins read in Latin HISPANIARIVM. REX, for The King of Spain, followed by the year in which the coin was minted.

On the reverse, the coins depict the Hapsburg Shield which served as the coat of arms of Felipe IV of Spain during his reign of the Spanish Empire between 1621 and 1665. The mint marks on the reverse contain three letters which are N, R, and A. The N and R stood for Nuevo Reino, or New Kingdom, and the A being the mintmaster mark of Alonso de Anuncibay who served as mintmaster, at the Santa Fé Mint, between 1632 and 1642. On the reverse-side, the coins' face value is marked by Roman numerals II that denotes the weights' value. The legend, which is partially cut-off due to the planchet being smaller than the die, reads in Latin PHILIPPVS. IIII. D. G for Philip IV by the Grace of God.

== Acquisition, display, and impact ==
In 1936, the same year in which the hoard was discovered, the Bank of the Republic acquired around 500 pieces of the hoard either directly from the Gúzman brothers or from individuals who had been paid by the brothers using the coins. The remaining coins, which were evenly distributed between the three brothers, were eventually sold or spent.

The coins that were acquired by the Banco de la República have been on public display at the Casa de Moneda since it was established as a museum in the 1990s.

In its prior display, which ran from 1994 to 2020, researchers from the National University of Colombia found, using eye tracking technology, that approximately 40% of the museum's visitors overlooked the treasure. They attributed this to an outdated and stagnant display that failed to engage visitors.

On 23 July 2023, and in commemoration of the Bank of the Republic centennial, the Museo Casa de Moneda re-opened to the public with a new permanent exhibition that included a new display for the Mesuno Treasure. The display simulates the rocky stream bed of the Magdalena River where the treasure was initially discovered by the Gúzmans in 1936.

== Gallery ==
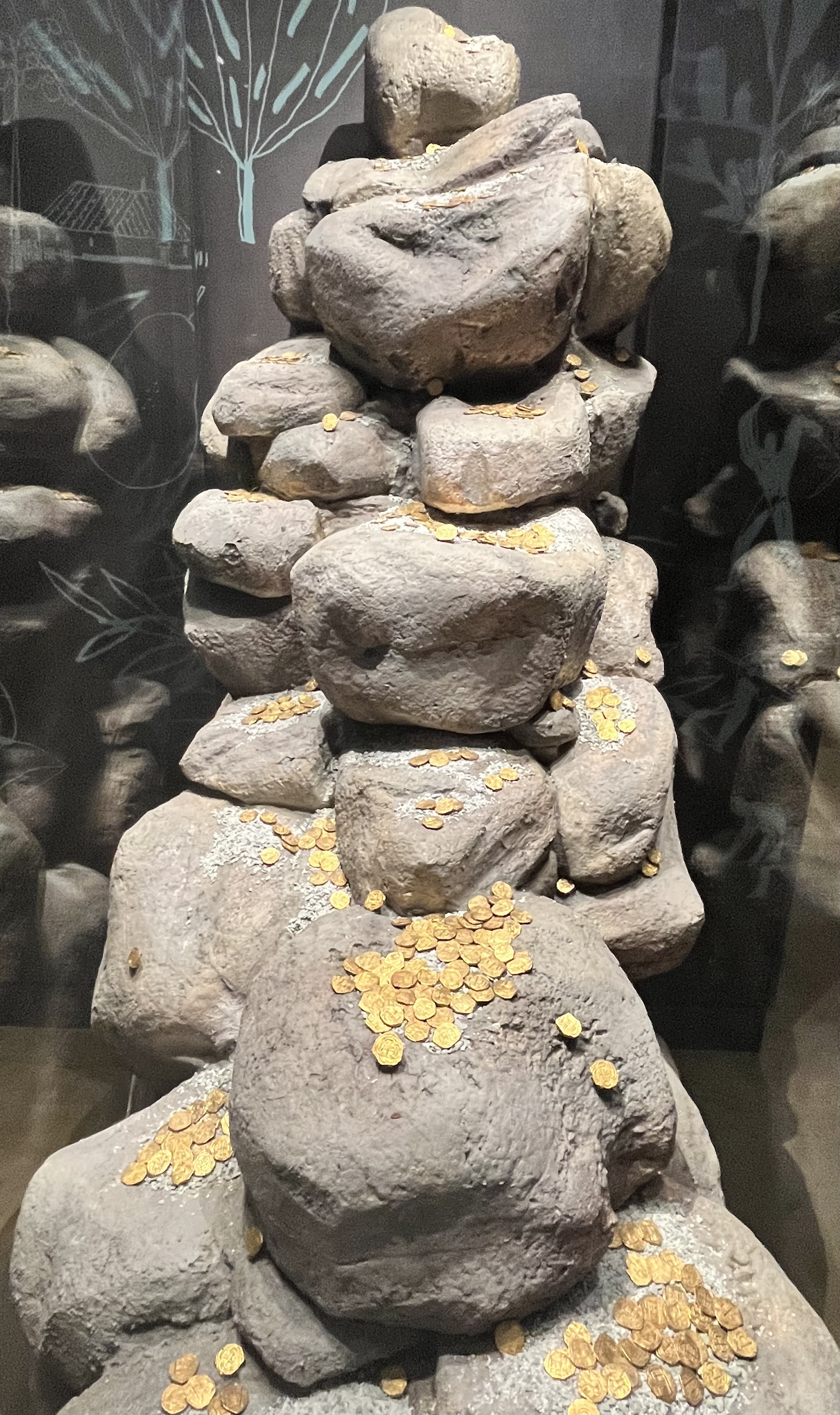

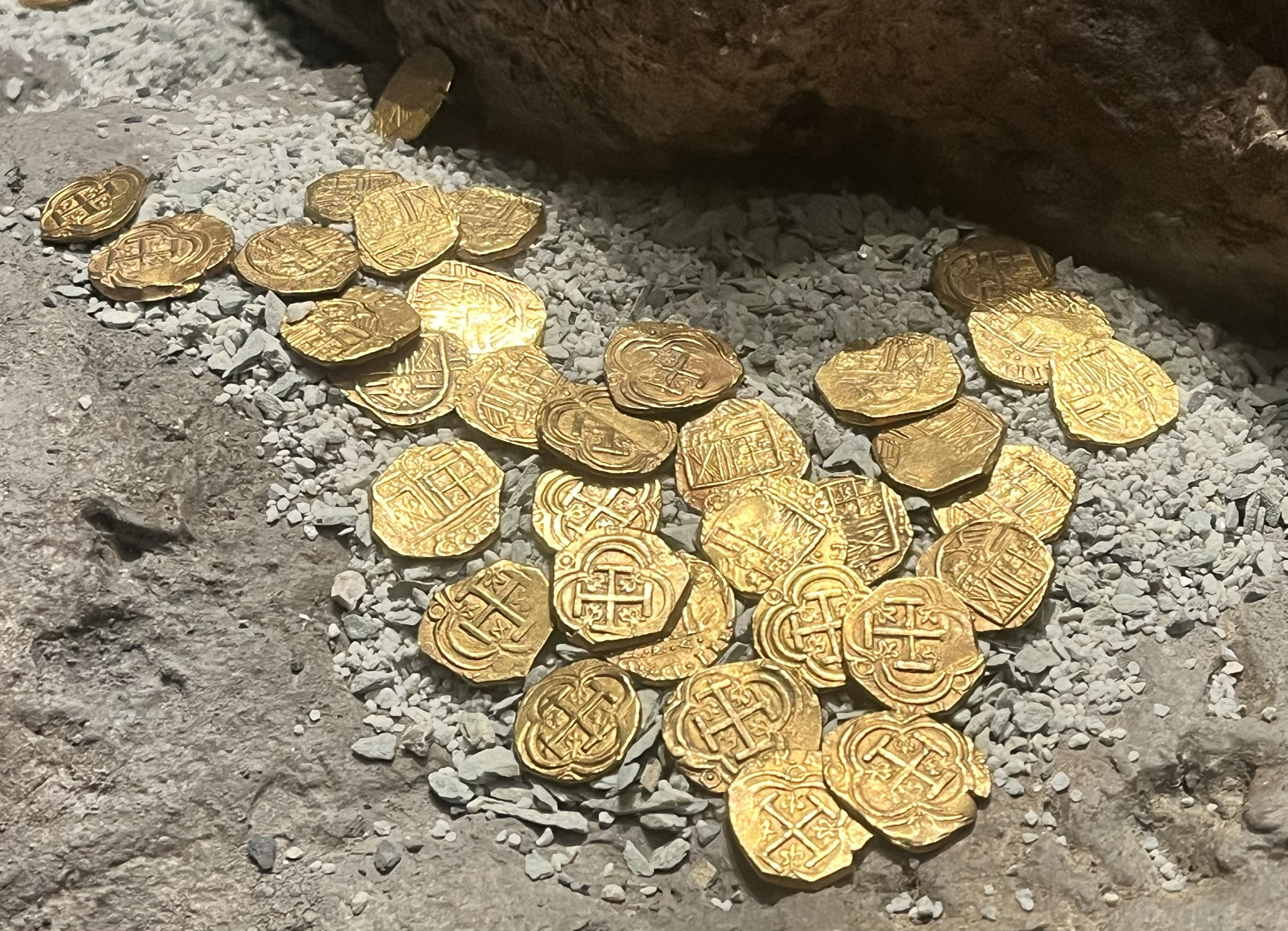

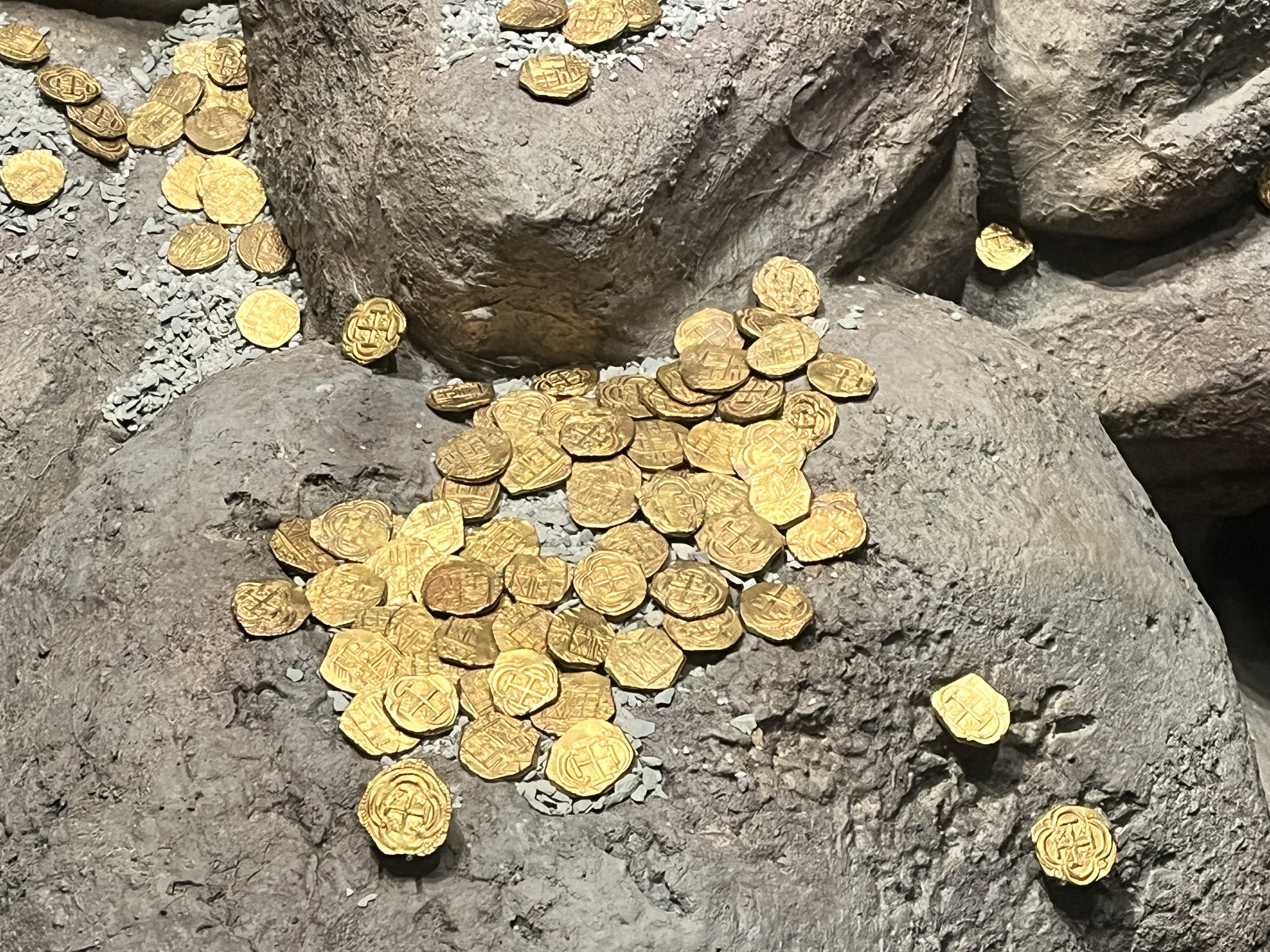

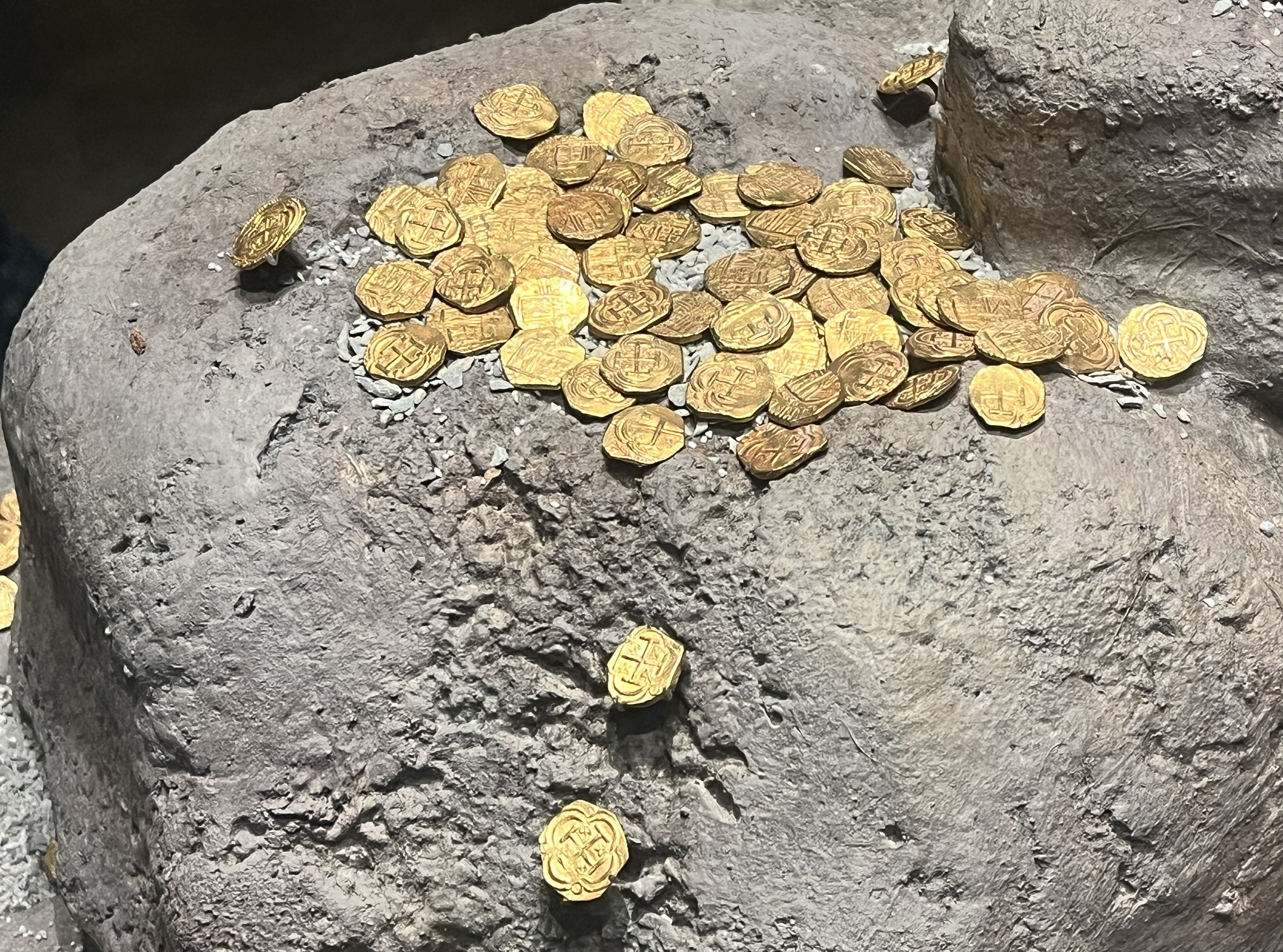

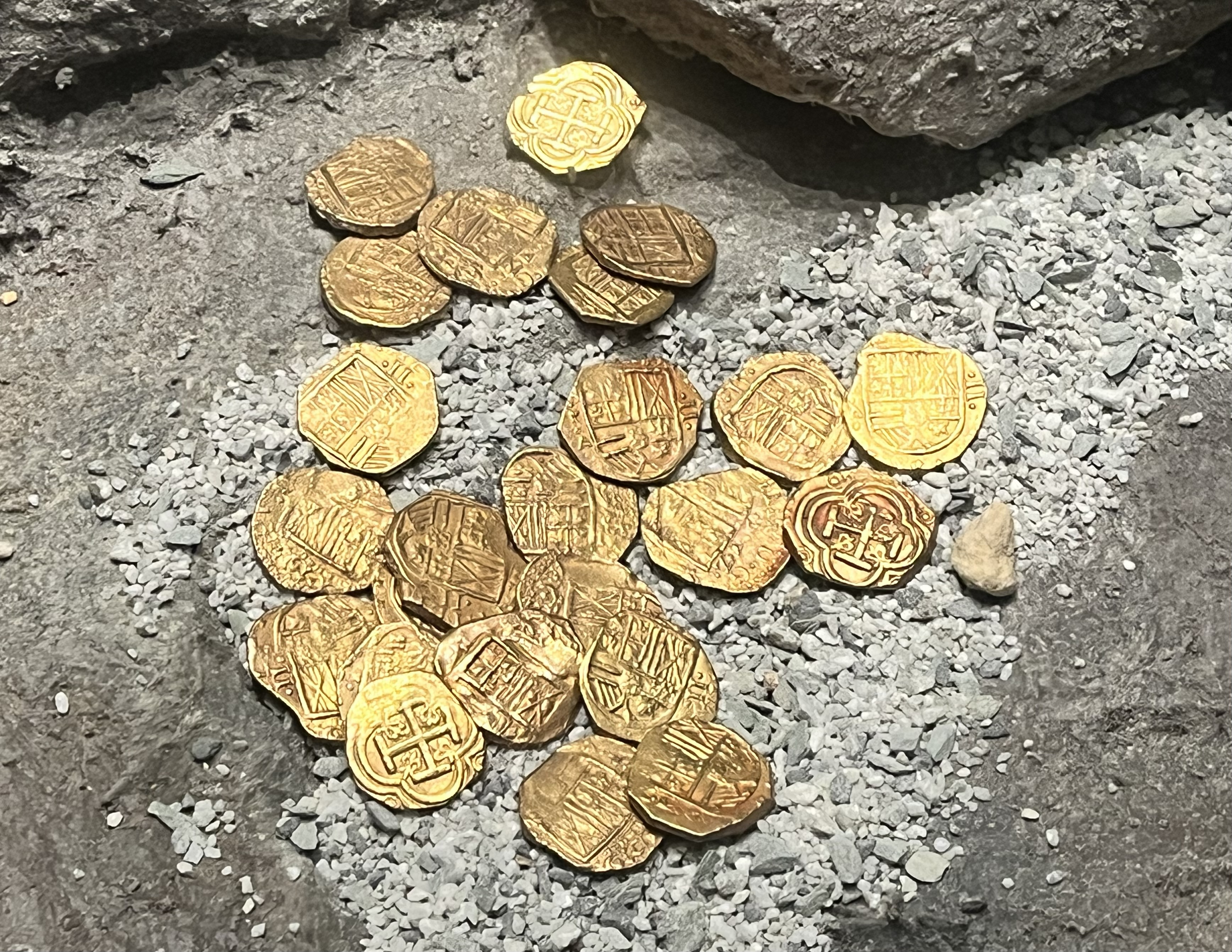

== See also ==
- Spanish galleon San José, a shipwreck found in Colombia also containing colonial treasure

== Literature ==
- El Tesoro De El Mesuno, Revista Del Banco De La República, 1936.
- Jaime Buitrago, Pescadores del Magdalena, Editorial Minerva, 1938.
- C.S. Wilcox, The Spanish Gold Treasure of El Mesuno, The Numismatic Review, 1943.
- Ignacio Henao, Así se despilfarró el tesoro de El Mesuno, El Nuevo Dia, 2007.
- Carlos Enrique Lozano, El Tesoro del Mesuno o la Guaca del 36, Gaceta, 2010.
