= Antonio de Vergara Azcárate =

17th-century Spanish royal colonial treasurer (1612–1690)

Knight Order of Santiago Antonio de Vergara Azcárate
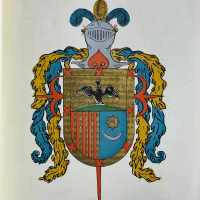

52nd Captain General Governor of Province of Cartagena
- In office 1668
- Monarch: Philip IV of Spain
- Lieutenant Governor: Captaincy of Cartagena; Mérida; Grita; Maracaibo
- Preceded by: Alonso Turrillo de Yebra
- Succeeded by: Joseph Ricaurte

2nd Treasurer of Santafe
- In office 1647–1680
- Monarch: Philip IV of Spain

202nd Mayor of Bogotá
- In office 1638–1639; 1674–1675

Personal details
- Born: Antonio de Vergara Azcárate y Dávila; January 11, 1612 Port of Cádiz, Spain
- Died: August 16, 1690 (aged 78) Maracaibo, Venezuela
- Citizenship: Spaniard
- Spouse: Alfonsa de López de Mayorga Fonseca y Olmos
- Education: San Bartolomé
- Occupation: Military, Politician, Accountant
- Awards: Encomienda of Tabio & Serrezuela (1650)

Military service
- Allegiance: Spanish Empire
- Branch/service: Spanish Army
- Rank: Maestre de campo, Captain General Spanish Captaincies
- Unit: Galleon Battalion
- Commands: Military defense of Cartagena de Indias, Zapasa Fort
- Vergara participated in the defense and fortification of Cartagena de Indias while acting as its governor.

Antonio de Vergara Azcárate y Dávila (1612–1690) was a Spanish royal colonial treasurer and knight, accountant of the Tribunal de Cuentas, colonial governor of Cartagena de Indias, Mérida and Maracaibo, mayor of Santa Fe Bogotá in the New Kingdom of Granada, and chief bailiff of the Holy Office of the Inquisition. Vergara was one of the Spaniards of position and wealth who began to settle in the American colonies at the beginning of the 17th century.

== Biography ==
Antonio Vergara Azcárate y Dávila was born in 1612 in Cádiz, Spain. His parents were Francisco de Vergara y Azcárate, lieutenant general and captain of artillery, and Inés de los Angeles y de Ávila. In 1621, with royal authorization, Alonso Turrillo de Yebra founded the first mint, known as the Casa de la Moneda, in Cartagena de Indias, in the New Kingdom of Granada. He was accompanied by his wife, Maria de Vergara Azcárate, and his 10-year-old nephew, Antonio, from Cádiz, Andalusia, Spain.

Antonio became governor and lieutenant captain general of the province of Cartagena, a position he held until 1637. He also served in Mérida and Maracaibo. Vergara was responsible for the defense of Cartagena de Indias on several occasions. The general of artillery, Diego de Villalba, who ruled in colonial America, appointed him to the position of fieldmaster (also known as Maestro de Campo), for the defense of Cartagena. He had previously worked as an accountant in Zaragoza, in the province of Antioquia. In particular, he was treasurer from 1637 to 1683. During the same time in which he was the treasurer of the Casa de la Moneda, he was also special commissioner of justice.

Antonio held several posts. He was in charge of collecting taxes for the Armada de Barlovento. He was also knighted in the Order of Santiago. He became the chief bailiff for the Inquisition and captain and sergeant major in Santafé; he was also the mayor of Santafé during 1673 and 1674.

In the colonies, individuals held their administrative positions for long periods of time, a practice inherited from the American kingdoms. This practice had an impact on both the individuals who held these administrative positions and their families. The Bourbon reforms of the 1700s led to the emergence of a bureaucratic aristocracy that played a role in stabilizing the newly established kingdoms.

In the 18th and 19th centuries, the Vergara family, descendants of Antonio, were recognized as a bureaucratic dynasty whose influence lasted from 1740 to 1810. This lasting influence was due to Antonio's 50-year tenure as treasurer in the 17th century.

In 1650, while serving as governor, Antonio received a royal decree granting him authority over the "encomienda de indios del pueblo de Serrezuela". This included the regions of Serrezuela and Tabio, inhabited by indigenous groups such as the Guancatas and Tenjos. In this area, Antonio founded an estate called Casablanca, which was passed down through generations of the Vergara family from 1651 to 1866. Finally, in 1866, one of his descendants, Jose Maria Vergara y Vergara, sold it to José María "Pepe" Sierra. The colonial house built by Antonio still stands in Madrid, Cundinamarca, Colombia, having remained in the Vergara family for 215 years.

During his tenure as treasurer, Vergara faced allegations of corruption in his administration. The allegations included the usage of royal prerogatives such as quintos and signiorage at times considered to be improper for his position. The Supreme Court and the Council of the Indies visited the Santafé Mint to investigate these allegations. The results favored Vergara Azcárate, so he remained treasurer until his death in 1690.

Colonial Treasurers Casa de la Moneda - Mint House of Coin of Santafe
Predecessor(1620–1637)	(1637–1683)	Successor(1683–1694)
Alonso Turrillo de Yebra	Antonio de Vergara Azcárate	Joseph Ricaurte
