= Robbery on the Bank of the Republic =

1994 bank robbery in Colombia

The Robbery on the Bank of the Republic (in Spanish: Asalto al Banco de la República), also known as The robbery of the century in Colombia (In Spanish: El robo del siglo en Colombia), was a robbery perpetrated on October 16 to 17, 1994 against a branch of the Bank of the Republic (the central bank of Colombia), located in Valledupar (a city in Northern Colombia) and in which the thieves took the sum of just over 24 billion Colombian pesos (US$33 million). The robbery was the largest amount stolen in paper currency in the history of Colombia.

After the robbery, the Banco de la República identified the stolen banknotes by their serial number and denomination, which had not entered into circulation to the public prior to the robbery, so they immediately lost their value. The bank published a list of the series ranges of the stolen bills and they came to be jokingly called los billetes vallenatos (The vallenato bills).

== Preparations ==
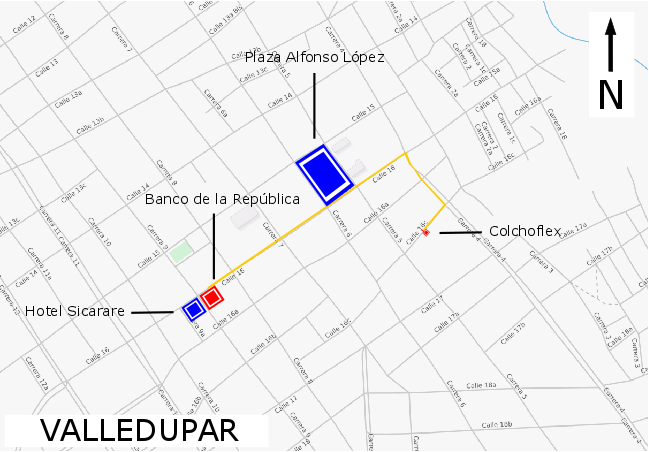
Map of downtown Valledupar showing the route to the mattress store from the branch of the Bank of the Republic

The plan to rob the Banco de la República in Valledupar was devised 8 months earlier, but started in June 1994, three months before committing the robbery, by Benigno Suárez Rincón and commanded by Alexánder Flórez Salcedo. Then Lt. Juan Carlos Carrillo Peña and Jaime Bonilla Esquivel were recruited for the robbery operation. They collected information from the bank's surveillance. Bonilla and National Police lieutenants Juan Carlos Carrillo Peña and César Augusto Barrera Caicedo met in Alfonso López Square to specify details of the robbery plan.

Bonilla asked Lt. Juan Carlos Carrillo Peña the details of the bank building in Valledupar and the security scheme that protected the place. 20 days later, Carrillo delivered the information about the security scheme to Bonilla.

The main financier of the robbery, Elkin Susa, bought the welding equipment in Canada for US$22,000 and paid for the training of 3 of the robbers in Bogotá to operate the equipment and destroy the vault. Days before starting the robbery, on October 13, 1994, the assailants sent two sophisticated welding equipment, tools, and several oxygen tanks from Cali to Valledupar to destroy the security systems of the bank vaults.

Bonilla met again in Valledupar with Lt. Carrillo at noon on Saturday, October 15. Then they held another meeting in which Bonilla, Carrillo, and Second Lieutenant Barón were present at 6:00 PM, where Bonilla explained that the robbery would take place the following day, Sunday, October 16. It is not clear if the robbery was already in progress and Bonilla wanted to mislead the two policemen. Bonilla assigned Lieutenants Carrillo and Barrera and Second Lieutenant Varón to patrol the vicinity of the bank on Sunday and early Monday morning. Bonilla specified that if the bank's alarm was activated, the other policemen appeared to attend to it, they would have to mislead saying that routine maintenance was being carried out inside the bank. Bonilla handed out some radios to the officers. Second Lieutenant Varón was ordered to move his patrol 10 meters away to facilitate the entry of the truck into the bank, without alerting other police officers.

Bonilla ordered the gang of 14 assailants, led by 'Camilo', 'El Chema' and 'El Pana', to spend the night inside the Colchoflex mattress store, owned by Ociel Echeverry López, to whom they offered $50 million pesos.

== The robbery ==
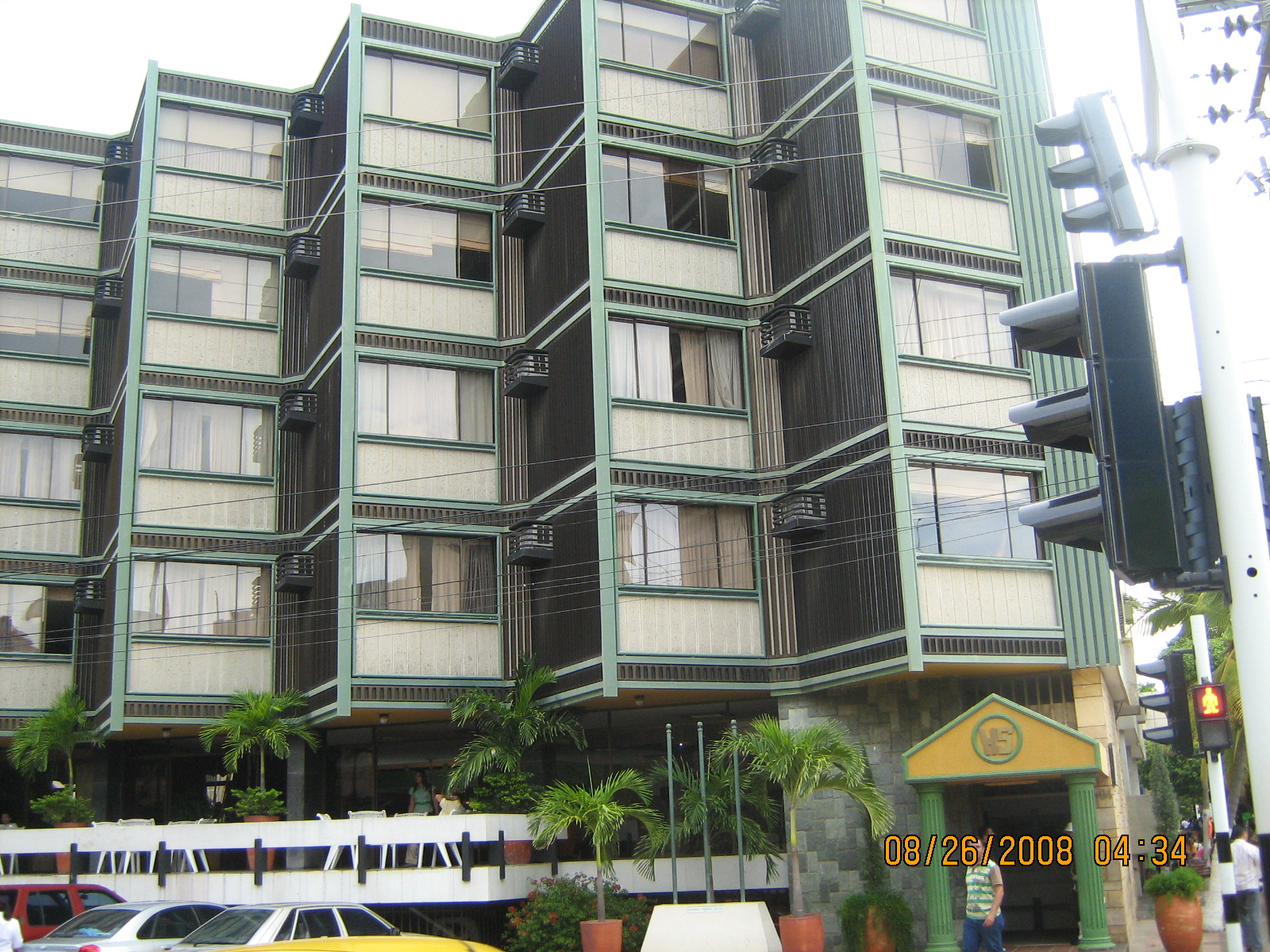
The Sicarare Hotel in Valledupar, where some of the assailants stayed

The robbery began on Sunday, October 16, 1994, at 6:00 AM, during the beginning of a holiday weekend. The assailants arrived in a red Dodge 600 truck that they parked outside of the bank. The assailants had the excuse that they had to repair the air conditioners in the bank building. An hour later, the assailants opened the garage door and drove the truck into the building. Suárez Rincón and Bonilla Esquivel, settled in rooms 202 and 306 of the Sicarare Hotel, which overlooked the bank, from where they coordinated the robbery operation using radios.

Shortly before 6:15 AM, the truck was turned off before entering the building, recording the entry on the security videos. The group of 14 thieves were hidden in the back of the truck covered by the tent. The driver of the truck, who was wearing a white coat with bank logos, identified as Luis Ernesto Vásquez Agudelo, asked several passers-by for help to push. The truck started and they put it into the bank's garage, which is a ramp to the basement. Lieutenants Carrillo, Barrera, and Varón saw the truck enter the Bank and began surveillance rounds around the bank. The bank door would have been opened by the security guard Winston Tarifa, who managed the bank's security systems inside and communicated directly with Bonilla Esquivel. Inside the bank were the other guards Dinael Ramírez, Pedro Arias and Mario de la Hoz, who were threatened and tied up by the assailants.

It took the assailants about an hour to deactivate the alarms and set up the welding equipment, which included 23 oxygen cylinders (17 60-pound and 6 40-pound), one acetylene cylinder, more than 35 meters three-phase cable, two air compressors, an exhaust fan, a mallet, a pair of surgical gloves, a crowbar, screwdrivers, pliers, socket wrenches, pliers, and black plastic liners.

In the middle of the robbery, there was a power outage in the area, which delayed the robbery. The raiders decided to use the oxygen and acetylene tanks. The delay forced the assailants to remain inside the building for 18 hours. With the teams they broke a pipe in a bathroom next to the vault, connected a hose to refrigerate while they pierced the armored door with a torch, then accessed the auxiliary door and then penetrated the main vault where the money was; a total of 24 billion pesos.

Finally, after almost 21 hours, security videos managed to record the departure of the assailants at 2:51 AM on October 17. The money in the vault was divided into denominations of $2,000, $5,000 and $10,000 pesos, which weighed about 3.8 tons and which they loaded onto the truck and took away from the bank. $6 billion pesos in low-denomination bills were abandoned at the bank because the truck was full of money. Meanwhile, inside the bank, in the control room for the closed circuit television (CCTV) and bank security alarms, the guard Winston Tarifa was tied up with false explosives attached to his body, some "broomsticks covered with plasticine pretending it was dynamite" and handcuffed to the stair railing.

== The escape ==
Bonilla was seen at dawn on Monday, October 17, leaving the Hotel Sicarare. Once outside the bank, the robbers went to the Colchoflex mattress store where they transferred the money to 2 trucks to transport beer. Of the $24 billion pesos, $4 billion would have been lost while being transported from Valledupar to other areas of the country, which they distributed among many people. Elkin Susa's group left for a farm in Fundación, where they packed the money in industrial cigarette boxes, then the money was taken to Ciénaga where they left the truck loaded with money in a parking lot.

At 2:00 PM on Monday, October 17, one of the guards who had been tied up and locked in the basement, Pedro Arias, managed to free himself and left the bank where he notified the police officers who were outside the bank.

The then sectional manager of the Banco de la República in Valledupar, Marco Emilio Zabala Jaimes, who was disabled at home due to an ear infection, was informed of what had happened by the assistant manager of the bank, Héctor Fabio Grajales.

== Involved ==
More than 100 people were captured and investigated for the events related to the robbery. The authorities determined that 26 people participated in the robbery, including members of the National Police.

Among the Involved people in the robbery, are:

Name	Role
Benigno Suárez Rincón, alias 'Don Pacho'	Mastermind of the robbery. Arrested on November 9, 1996, he was a former lieutenant of the drug trafficker Gonzalo Rodríguez Gacha, aka 'El mexicano'. For the bank robbery in Valledupar, he was sentenced on February 1, 1999, to a sentence of 17 years and 10 months in prison.
Alexander Florez Salcedo.	Lieutenant of Benigno Suárez Rincón, aka 'Don Pacho'
Lieutenant Juan Carlos Carrillo Peña	Chief of the Judicial Police in Cesar Department. Considered a partner of Alexander Flórez Salcedo. He was sentenced to 10 years in prison.
Jaime Bonilla Esquivel, aka 'Bolinillo' or 'Botella'	Lawyer and former investigator of the Technical Corps of the now defunct National Directorate of Criminal Investigation at the service of Lieutenant Juan Carlos Carrillo Peña. He would later become the leader of the raiding party. He turned himself in to the Attorney General's Office on November 1, 1994, admitting that he had participated in the robbery, but that he had not been the mastermind.
Elkin Susa, aka 'Camilo'	One of those who devised the plan to steal the money from the vault and financed the robbery with $120 million pesos. He was the person in charge of acquiring the equipment in Canada to access the vaults.
Major Fabio Guillermo Guzmán Cuervo	He made the link between the policemen who carried out the robbery. On August 19, 1998, Guzmán Cuervo was sentenced at first instance to 15 years and 9 months in prison.
Lieutenant Cesar Augusto Barrera Caicedo	He was assigned to El Dorado International Airport, in Bogotá, when he was recruited for the robbery operation with the promise of juicy loot. He was sentenced to 10 years in prison for his participation in the robbery. He said that After we divided up some money at Colchoflex Mattress Store, as they knew that the operations and raids were going to be very hard, they decided to take the money to the governor's farm, because we knew that the Police would not enter there.
Second Lieutenant Jairo Alberto Varón Montero	Police who were in charge of assigning and monitoring surveillance patrols in Valledupar.
Hector Ociel Echeverry Lopez	Owner of the Colchoflex mattress store, he provided vehicles for the robbery and lent his business premises and his house to members of the gang, for which he received a payment of $50 million pesos.
Gabriel Herrera, aka 'The Mole'	Robber inside the bank. He installed the equipment and disabled the alarms. He lent the key to open the vault and was in charge of operating the torch to break the lock, for which he would have received $300 million pesos. he turned himself in to the authorities on March 29, 1995, in Bogotá.
Luis Ernesto Vasquez Agudelo	Driver of the truck in which the $24 billion pesos were taken from the bank.
Winston Tariffa	Surveillance coordinator of the bank, he managed the bank's security systems inside and he was in charge of opening the garage door for the truck with the assailants to enter.
Gonzálo, aka 'Gonzalito'	A native of Bucaramanga, once the hole in the vault was opened, he was in charge, due to his thinness, of entering and stealing the money.

The gang led by Bonilla was made up of 21 people divided into four groups of assailants who came from the cities of Bogotá, Valledupar, Barranquilla and Bucaramanga to commit the assault.

== Consequences ==
After the massive robbery, on October 26, 1994, the board of directors of the Banco de la República authorized the banks to reimburse small amounts of bills to people who, acting in good faith, received the stolen bills. The stolen banknotes generated chaos in the Colombian commerce and financial system. The measure was adopted after a meeting between the Issuer and the Attorney General's Office, the Attorney General's Office, the Comptroller's Office, the Banking Superintendence, the Association of Banks and Financial Institutions (Asobancaria) and the National Association of Financial Institutions (ANIF).

To launder the money, the gang of robbers exchanged the bills with the stolen denominations for others legally circulating. They also sold 10,000-peso bills at 7,000 or less, in order to receive legal money, at half their real value. In other cases, the robbers, their accomplices or common criminals erased one or two numbers of the serial to keep the money in circulation.

Colombia's leading jurists began a debate to determine whether the stolen bills, which had not yet been issued by the republic's bank to the public, were legal or not and should be covered by insurers. As of September 8, 1997, the insurance companies covered the entire amount stolen from the bank, so the bank did not lose any money. The money recovered was reimbursed to the insurers.

Due to the massive theft of money, the following banknotes were discontinued in Colombia and replaced by new ones, with different designs:

Denomination	Edition date	Serial numbers
$10,000 - Ten Thousand Pesos	1993	68,200,001 to 68,600,000; 75,000,001 to 75,600,000
$5,000 - Five Thousand Pesos	January 3, 1994	28,100,001 to 28,200,000; 48,300,001to 48,900,000; 63,200,001 to 64,100,000; 79,200,001 to 79,800,000
$2,000 - Two Thousand Pesos.	July 1, 1993	43,150,001 to 43,500,000; 53,450,001 to 54,200,000; 61,000,001 to 61,600,000

== Investigation ==
The investigations into the robbery against the bank were carried out jointly by the Office of the Attorney General of the Nation, the National Subdirectorate of Judicial Police and Investigation (Dijin), the Administrative Department of Security (DAS) and the National Police from Colombia.

After the robbery, the authorities discovered the identity of Jaime Bonilla Esquivel and published his photo in the media. The group of assailants, seeing that Bonilla Esquivel had been identified, offered him money and asked him to turn himself in to try to prevent them from continuing to persecute the other members of the group.

Some time after the robbery, investigators found bales of banknotes, with the serials reported as stolen, in a farm at the Hacienda 'El Paraíso', owned by the governor of the department of Cesar, Lucas Gnecco.

The assailants and their accomplices bought luxurious estates, cattle, jewelry, vehicles and weapons with the money in order to hide the origin of the money.

On October 17, 1995, the authorities reported that they had carried out 280 searches, detained some 90 people, 45 of them implicated, and had recovered close to $2 billion pesos. The bank had exchanged some $7 billion pesos in bills with denominations that had been stolen. Some $8 billion pesos of the $24 billion stolen in Valledupar were still missing.

== In other media ==
More than 25 years after the robbery occurred, the production company Dynamo, together with Netflix and a select group of renowned Colombian actors, recreated from fiction the events that occurred in the robbery in the miniseries called "The Great Heist", broadcast in full by the streaming platform Netflix, on August 14, 2020.

There was an adaptation for television that was known as El Gran Robo (2007), starring Jairo Camargo and Diego Cadavid.

The details of the robbery have been reflected in books such as "Así robé el banco", written by the journalist Alfredo Serrano.
