= Fábrica de Moneda =

National mint of the Republic of Colombia

Coordinates: 4.40076°N 75.14651°W

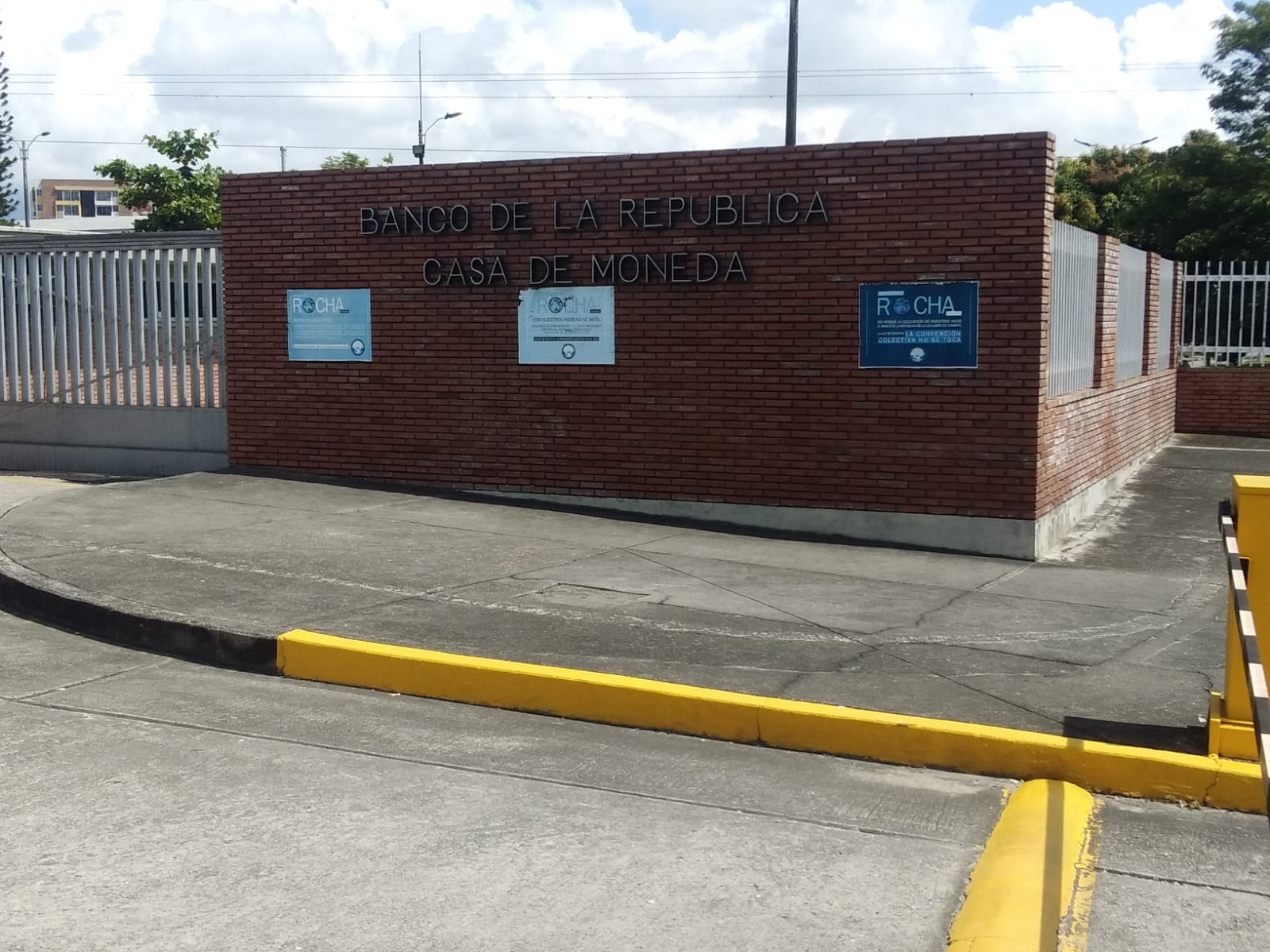
- Gate entrance at Kilómetro 9 viá a Picaleña, Ibagué
- Industry: Mint
- Predecessor: Casa de Moneda
- Founded: 1982; 44 years ago
- Headquarters: Ibagué, Tolima
- Key people: Fabian Humberto Muñoz Garcia (Director)
- Products: Coins & planchets
- Owner: Bank of the Republic
- Number of employees: 200
- Website: www.banrep.gov.co/es/billetes-monedas/fabrica-moneda

The Fábrica de Moneda (Spanish for Coin Factory) is the national mint of Colombia responsible for producing coinage to conduct commerce and trade. The mint is located in the city of Ibagué and it's wholly owned and managed by the Bank of the Republic, the nation's central bank.

== History ==
By 1980, the Casa de Moneda de Bogotá imported planchets, or blanks, into the country at an annual cost of over USD 11 million. For that reason, Luis Guillermo Correa, the then director of the mint in Bogotá proposed for the central bank to acquire the necessary technology for the planchets to be produced in Colombia. The bank determined that it was a good financial decision, and in 1982 the Fábrica de Moneda de Ibagué was established. With the bank's decentralization policy to move away production from the nation's capital, and its proximity to other urban centers, the city of Ibagué was chosen as the location of the mint.

From its establishment, the mint provided planchets to the Casa de Moneda de Bogotá where they were eventually struck into Colombian peso coins. In 1987, the Bank of the Republic began coining coins in the Fábrica de Moneda and, since then, the mint has been the only authorized producer of Colombian peso coins in the country.

== Operations ==
In addition to minting Colombian peso coins, the Fábrica de Moneda has minted legal tender coins for the governments of Costa Rica and Ecuador, and has provided planchets for the Central Bank of Chile and the Government of Spain.

== See also ==
- Museo Casa de Moneda
- List of Mints
