= Museo Casa de Moneda =

Numismatics museum in La Candelaria, Bogota, Colombia

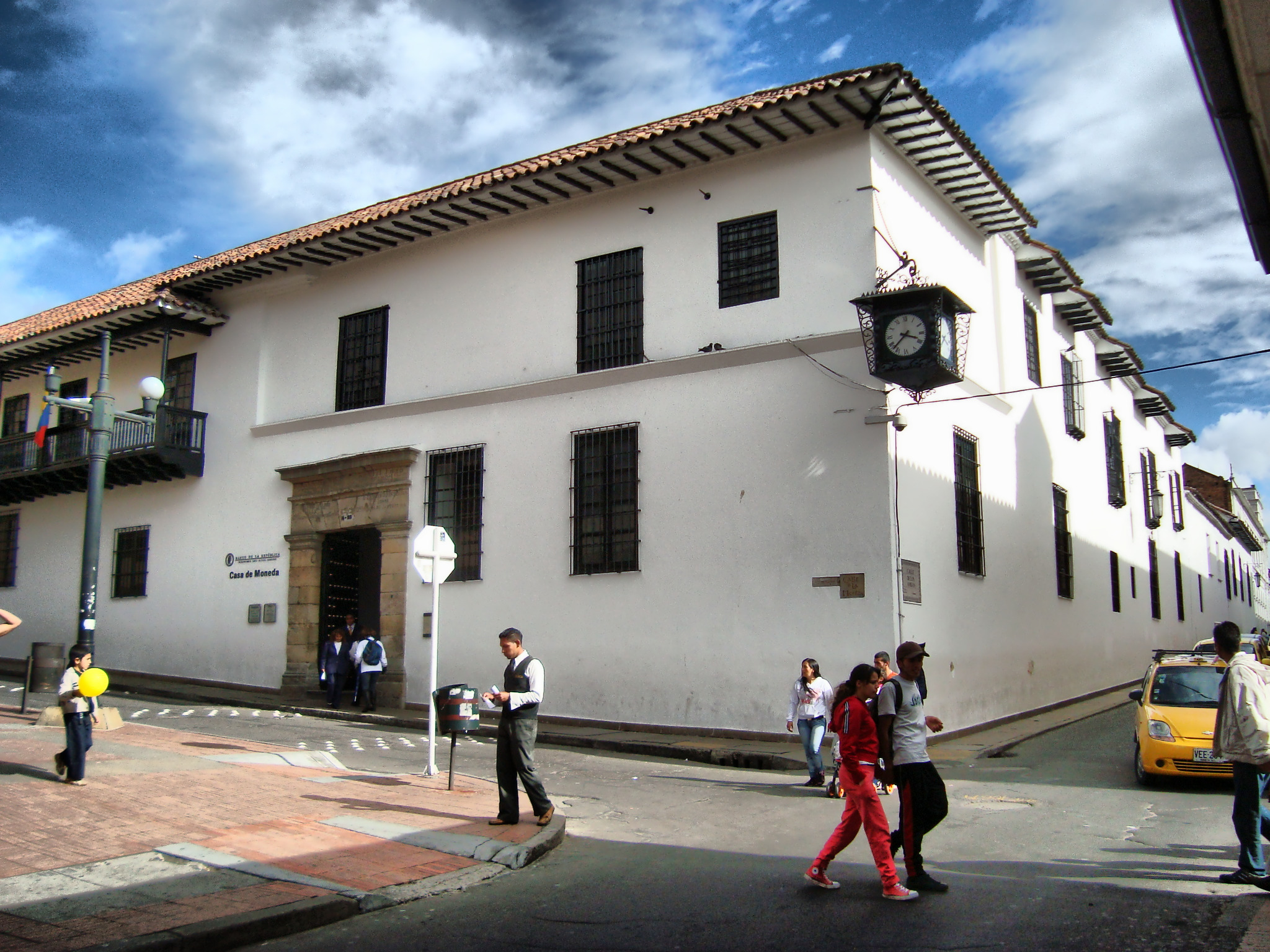
- Street view of the museum
- Interactive fullscreen map
- Established: July 20, 1961; 64 years ago
- Location: Calle 11 # 4-93; Bogotá
- Coordinates: 4°35′49″N 74°04′25″W
- Type: Numismatics
- Public transit access: Museo del Oro station
- Website: www.banrepcultural.org/bogota/casa-de-moneda

The Museo Casa de Moneda (Spanish for Mint Museum) is a numismatics museum located in La Candelaria neighborhood of Bogotá, Colombia. It is managed by the Bank of the Republic of Colombia and used to display its numismatic collection that is composed by around 18,600 objects that include artwork, banknotes, bonds, coins, derivatives, medals, negotiable instruments, and printing instruments from various periods and regions of the world.

The museum is located in the same building that served as the main mint for the New Kingdom of Granada, New Granada and modern-day Colombia between 1621 and 1987. Coin minting was moved to the Fábrica de Moneda in Ibagué in 1987.

The Museo Casa de Moneda is part of the Banrepcultural Network along with the Botero Museum, the Gold Museum, the Luis Ángel Arango Library, and the Miguel Urrutia Art Museum in Bogotá.

== History ==
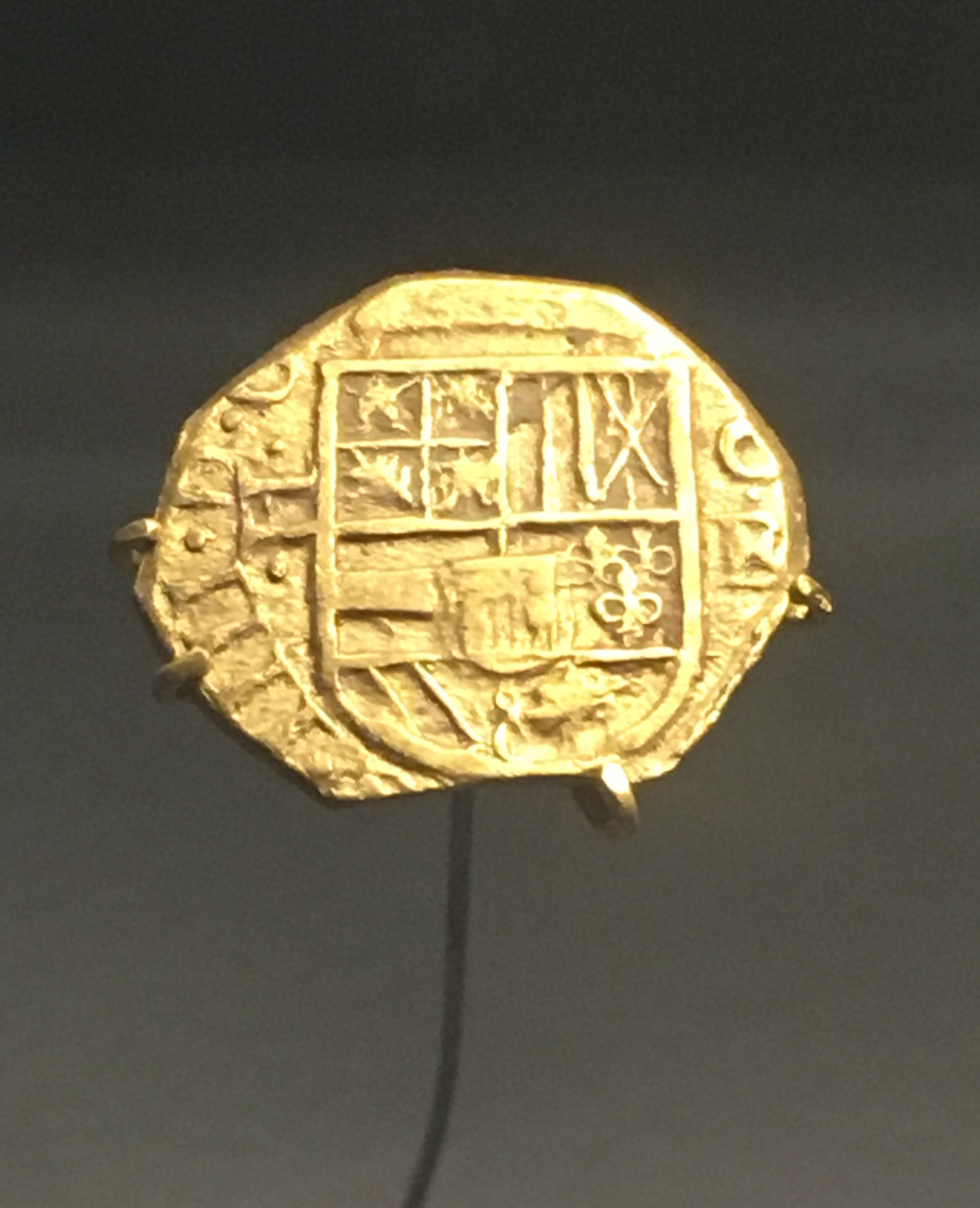
1630 Double escudo ("pistole") of Felipe IV part of the collection

The museum stands where the New Kingdom of Granada established its first mint by orders of Philip III of Spain. It was the original location of the national mint having been founded in 1621 as the mint ("casa de moneda" translates as "mint") by spanish military engineer Alonso Turrillo de Yebra.

With the purpose of presenting the history of Colombian currency, from the Colony to the Republican period, on July 20, 1961, the Bank of the Republic opened the doors of the Numismatic Museum on where it exhibited for the first time its extensive collection of coins and tickets. At that time the museum had 1,032 pieces, including 400 two-escudo gold Santa Fereña macuquinas, minted between 1628 and 1636, found in the Magdalena River and known as the Tesoro del mesuno.

On 11 July 1975, the Colombian Institute of Culture, now known as the Ministry of Culture by order of decree established that the edifice where the museum now stands was declared a National Treasure due to its historical value. With the establishment of the Fábrica de Moneda in Ibagué in 1982, and the eventual move in the production of Colombian peso coins to the new mint, the Casa de Moneda closed production in 1987.

On 23 July 2023, and in commemoration of the Bank of the Republic centennial, the Museo Casa de Moneda re-opened to the public with a new permanent exhibition.

== Collection ==
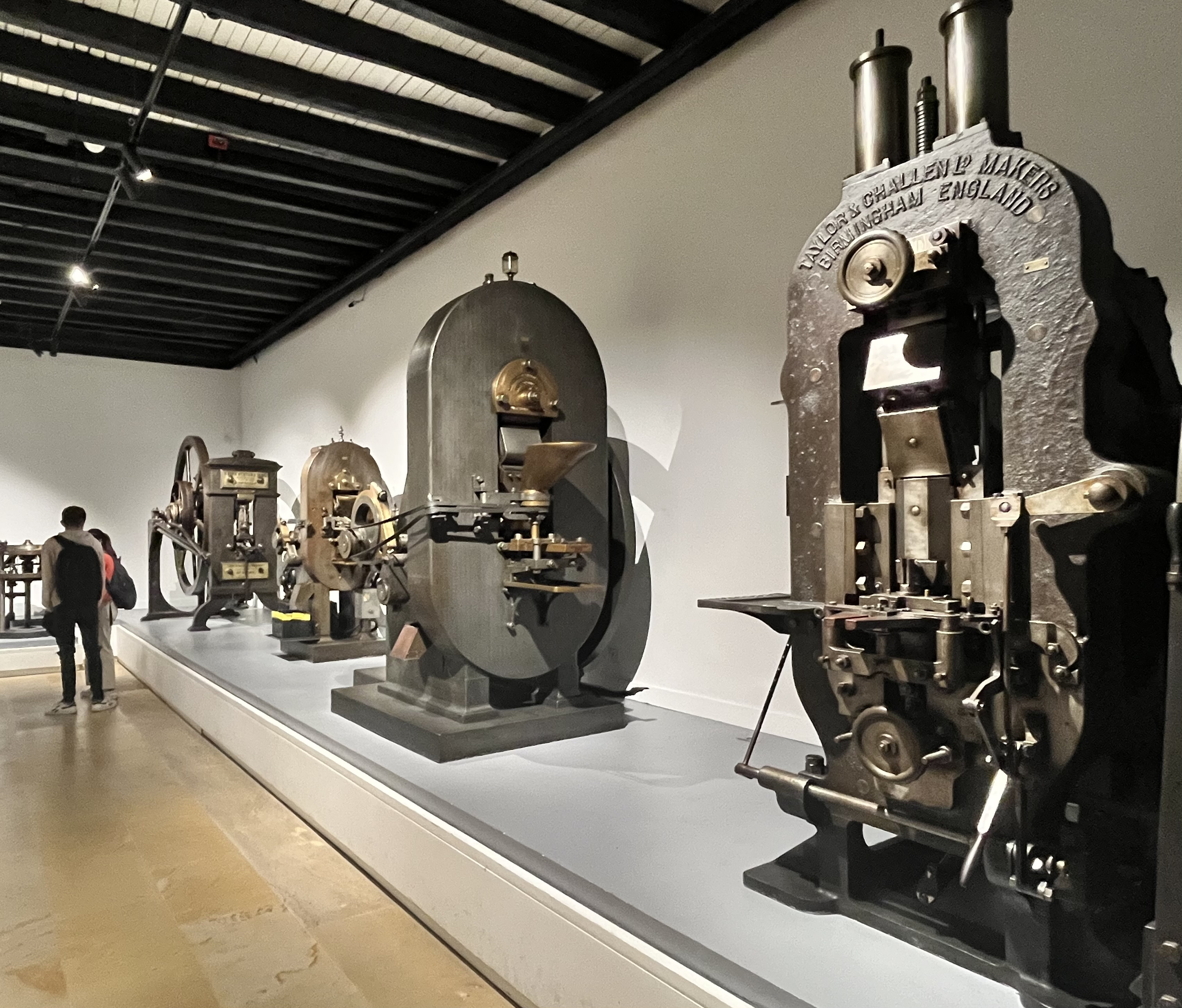
Antique machinery used for the production of banknotes and coins

The Museo Casa de Moneda in itself does not have a permanent collection, however it is adapted by the Banco de la República to display its numismatic collection as well as part of its art and pre-columbian archeology collections, borrowed from the Gold Museum, that include themes pertaining to currency and its history.

As of the latest renovation that concluded in August 2023, Museo Casa de Moneda is divided into 11 different exhibitions. The first exhibition, Casa de Moneda Santafé, covers the history of the first mints of the Spanish Empire in the New World. The museum itself is located within the Santafé de Bogotá Mint building, which was established by Philip III of Spain in 1620 to coin gold and silver that circulated in the New Kingdom of Granada. The second exhibition, the History of Currency, includes a range of pre-Columbian currency items like cacao seeds and shell money, as well as barley from the Akitu people, and examples of commodity money like cigarettes in prisons.

The third and fourth exhibitions, the History of currency in the New Kingdom of Granada: the Habsburgs and the History of currency in the New Kingdom of Granada: the Bourbons, cover the history of currency in Spanish America, particularly that pertaining to the New Kingdom of Granada. Items in this exhibits include Spanish Empire coins minted with silver from Cerro Rico, in Potosí, and Spanish Empire gold coins minted with gold extracted from colonial Antioquia and Chocó. The fifth exhibit, Independence, covers the history of currency during the Spanish American wars of independence and the First Republic of New Granada.

The sixth exhibition, How are Coins Made?, cover three eras of processes and techniques used for the manufacturing of coins. The first cover the artisanal manufacturing process of the macuquinas, the second the mechanical production process of the coins of cord, and lastly the industrial manufacturing process of current coins. Similarly, the eight exhibition How are Banknotes Made? cover the history of banknote making process in three important moments of Republican-era Colombia.

Exhibitions seven, nine, ten and eleven, cover the history of currency in the XIX, XX and XXI centuries, as well as an exhibition dedicated to numismatics in art.

== Gallery ==
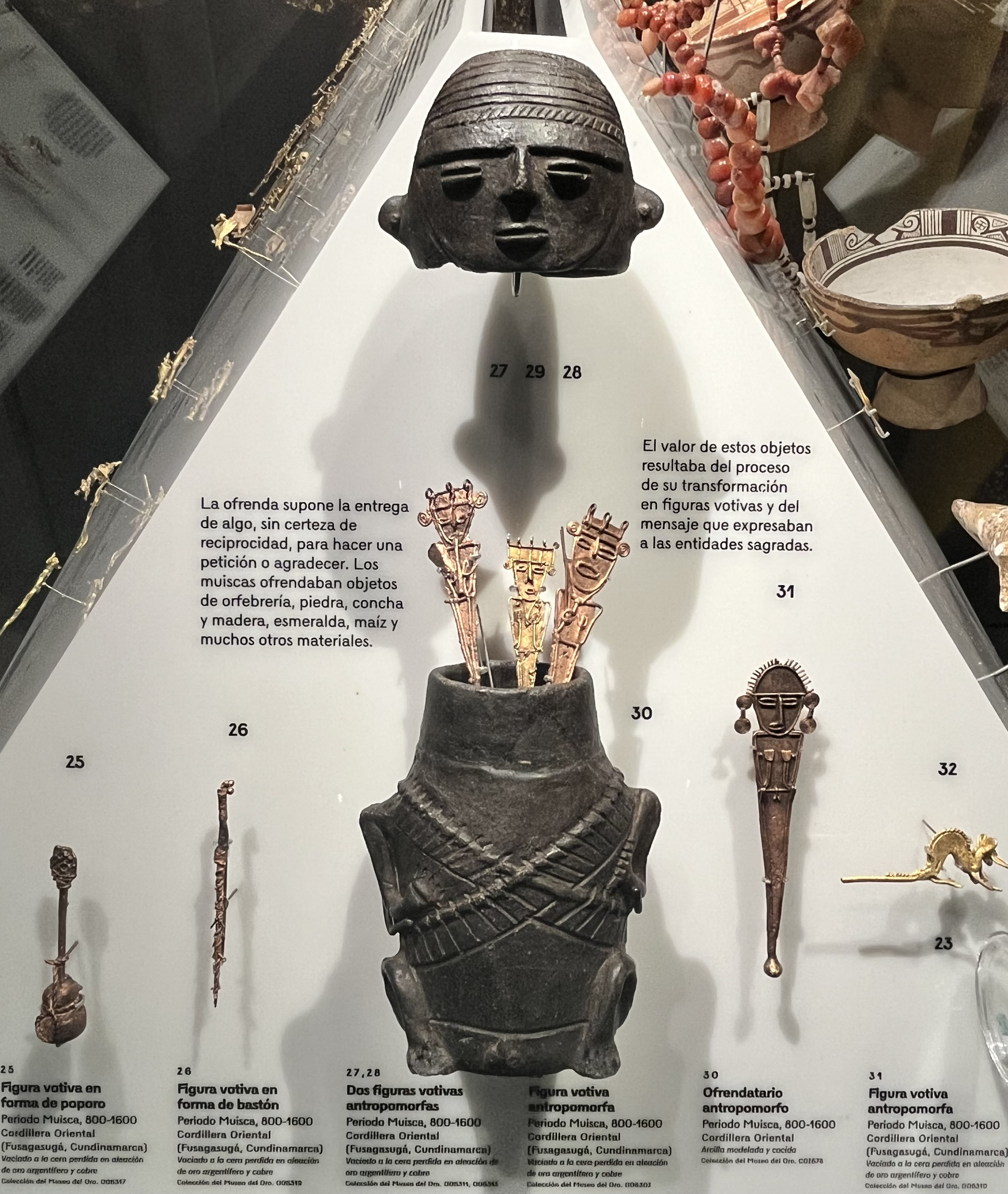
Pre-columbian Muisca ofrenda with tunjos

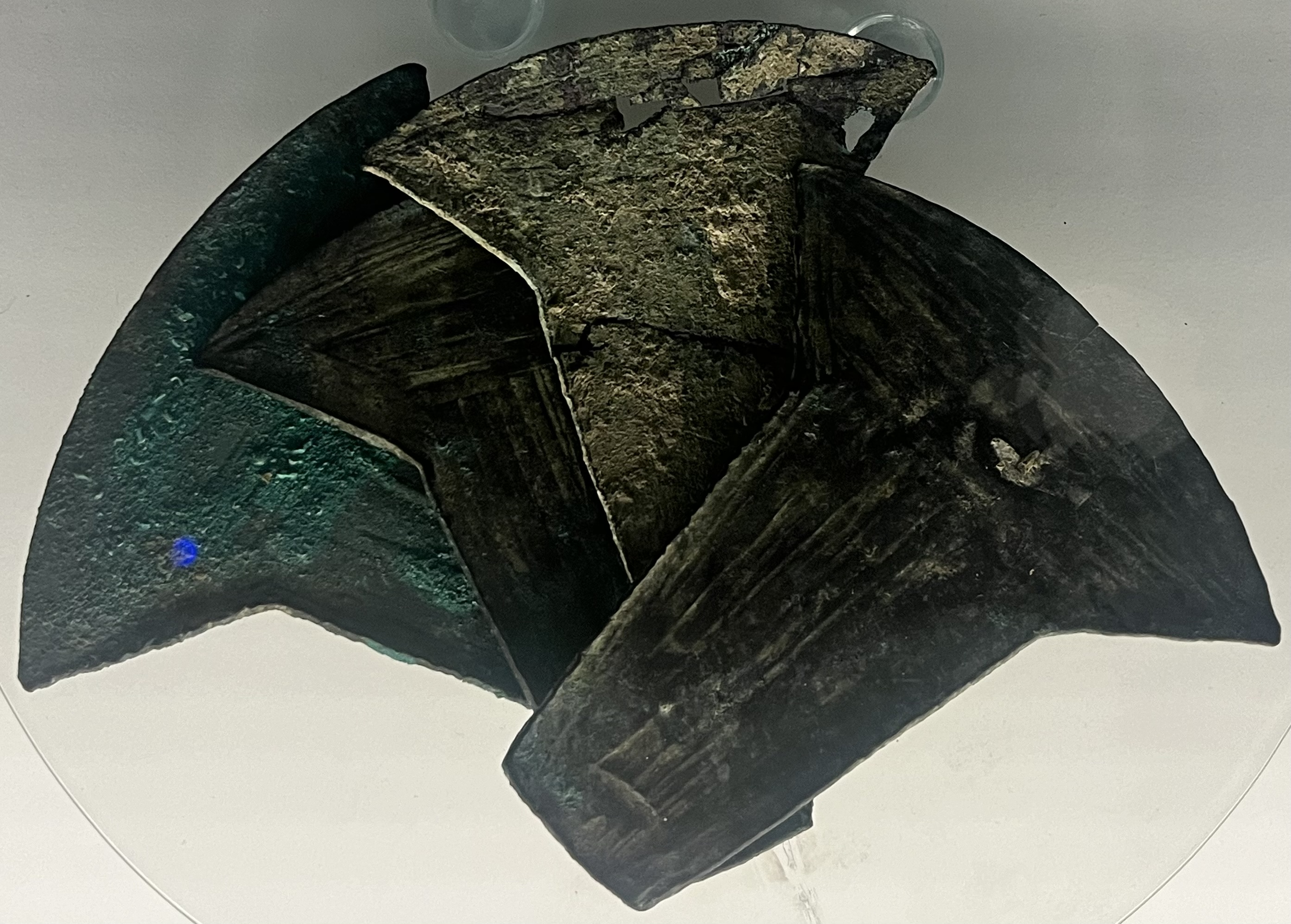
Axe-monies from the Manteño-Huancavilca culture in pre-Columbian Ecuador

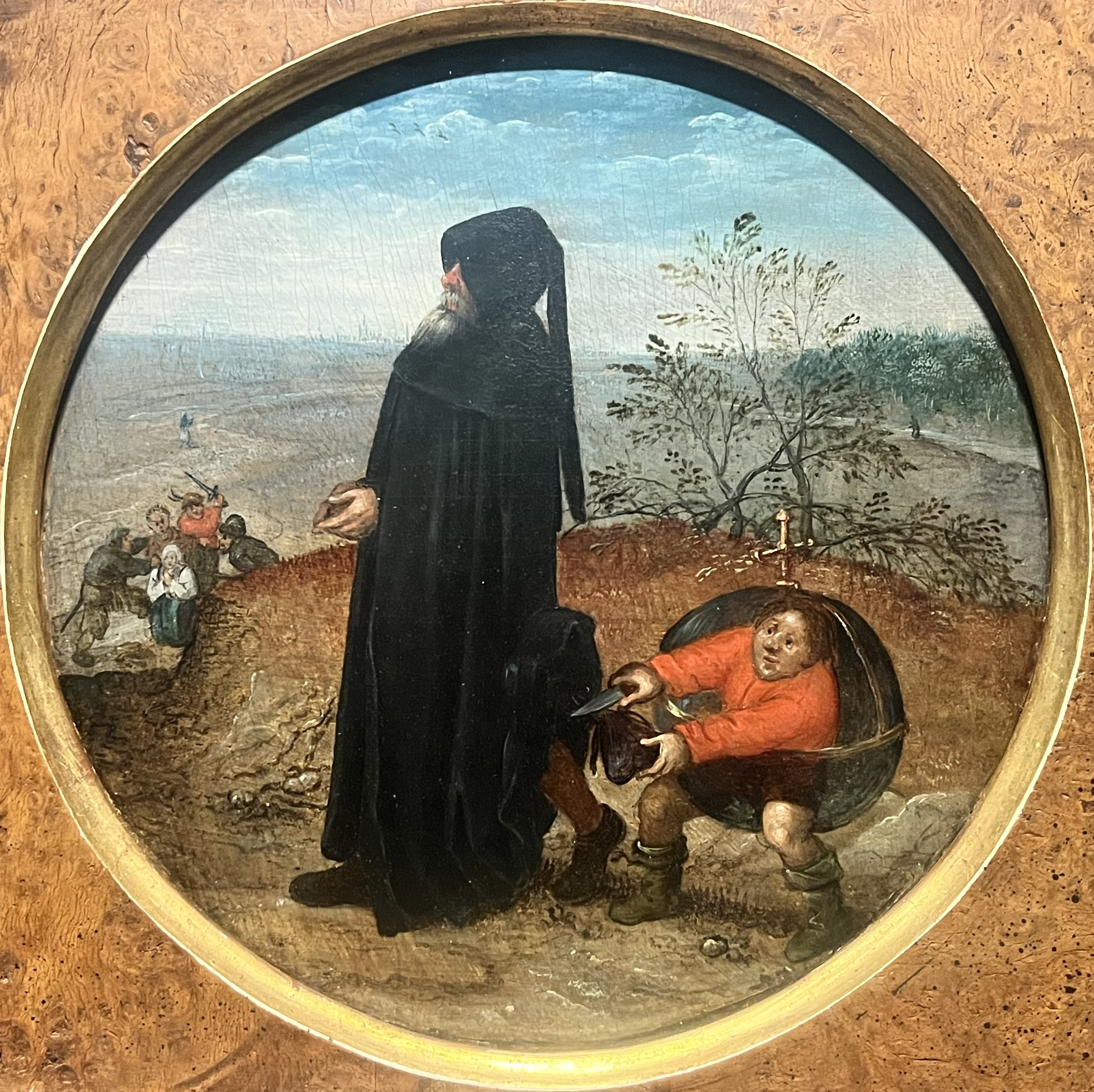
The Misanthrope (1600) by Pieter Brueghel the Younger

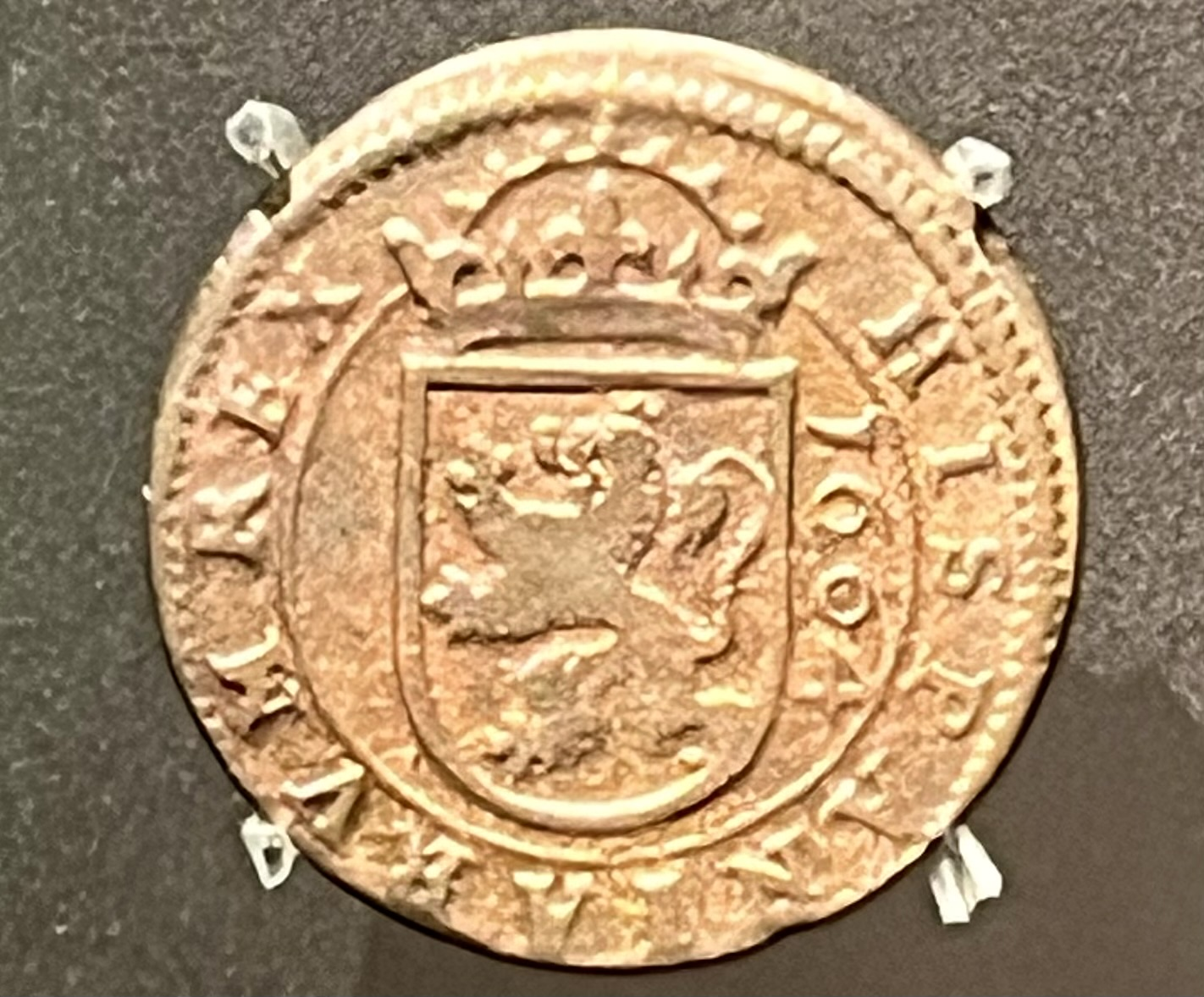
8 Maravedís from the Crown of Castile, 1604

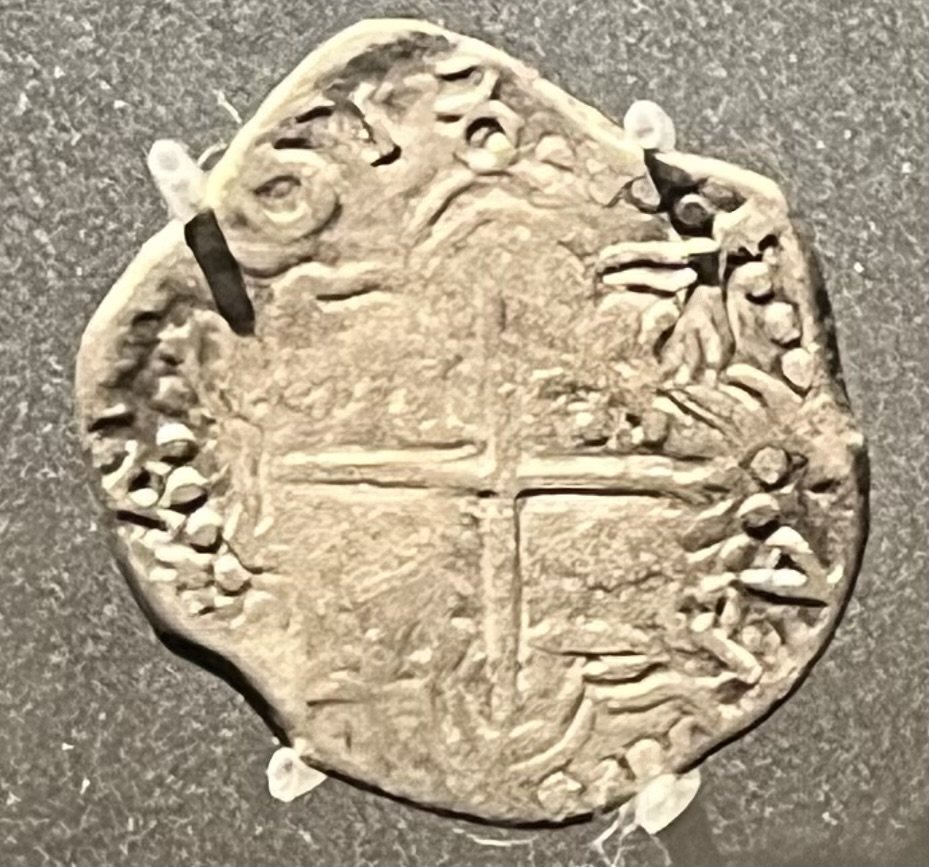
2 Reales silver coin minted in Potosí, Bolivia, 1618

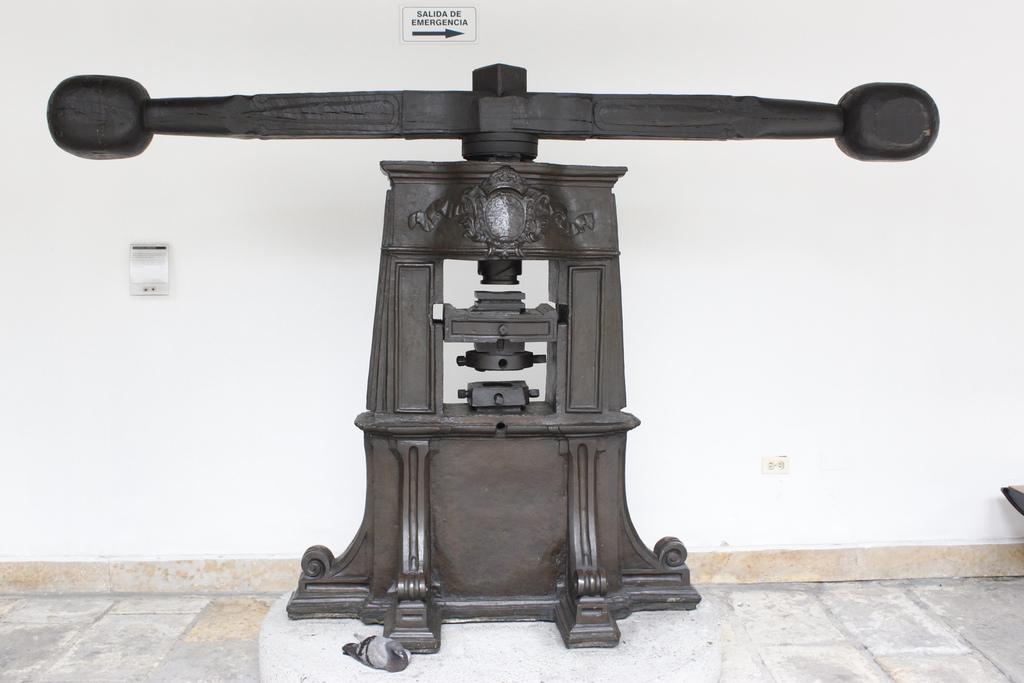
An early coinpress, or mint, 1700s

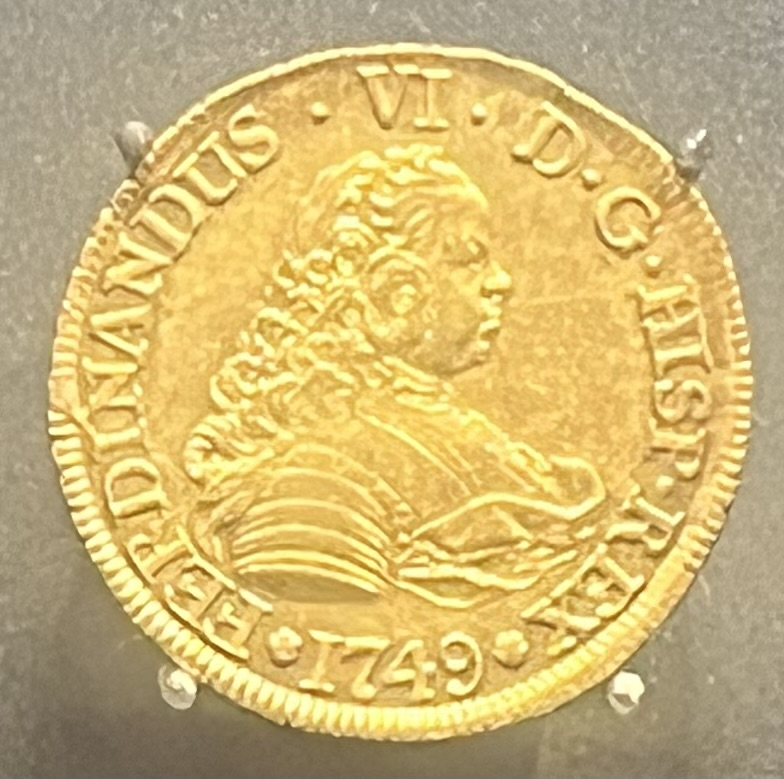
4 Spanish escudo gold coin minted in the Captaincy General of Chile, 1749

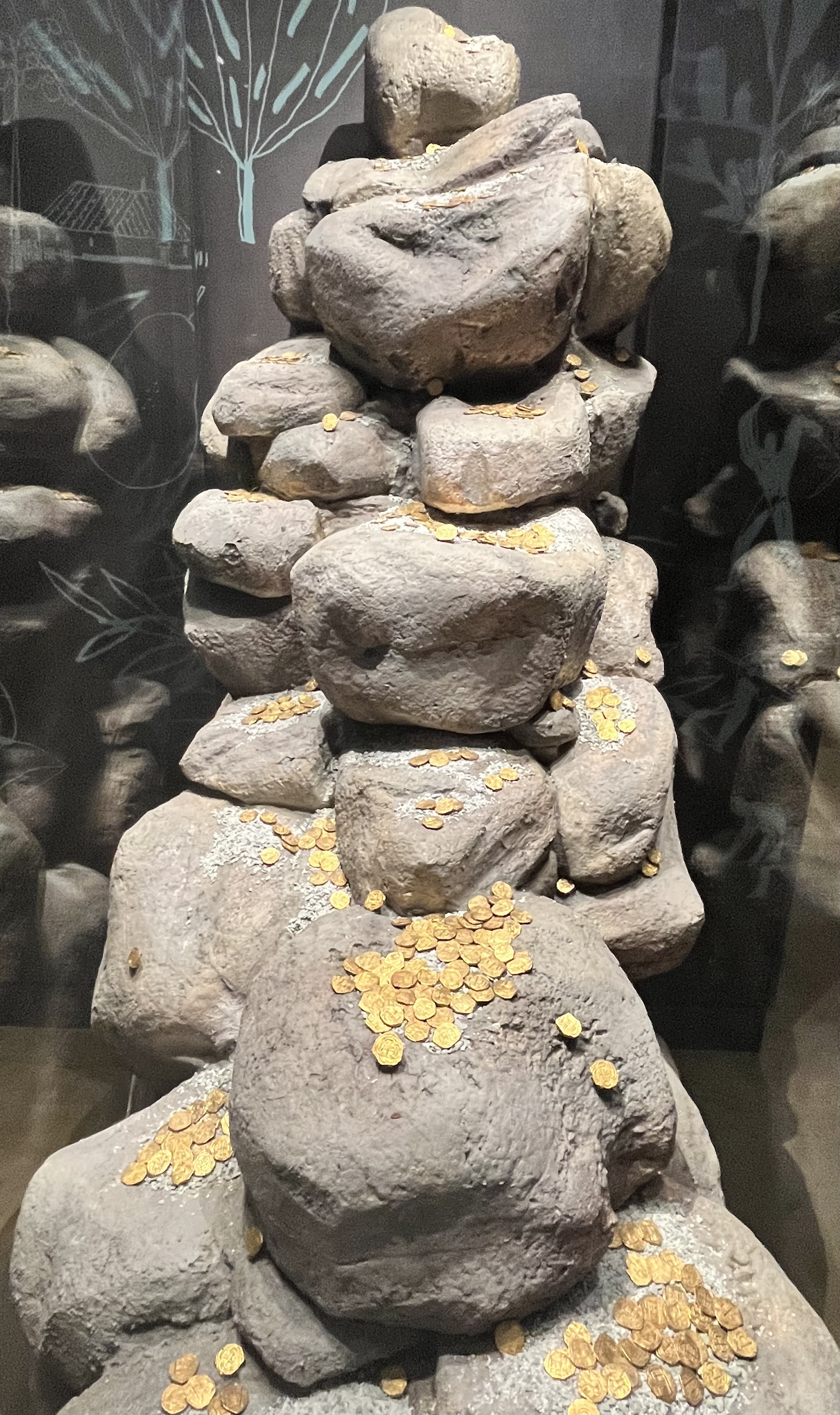
Mesuno Treasure coins from Honda, Tolima

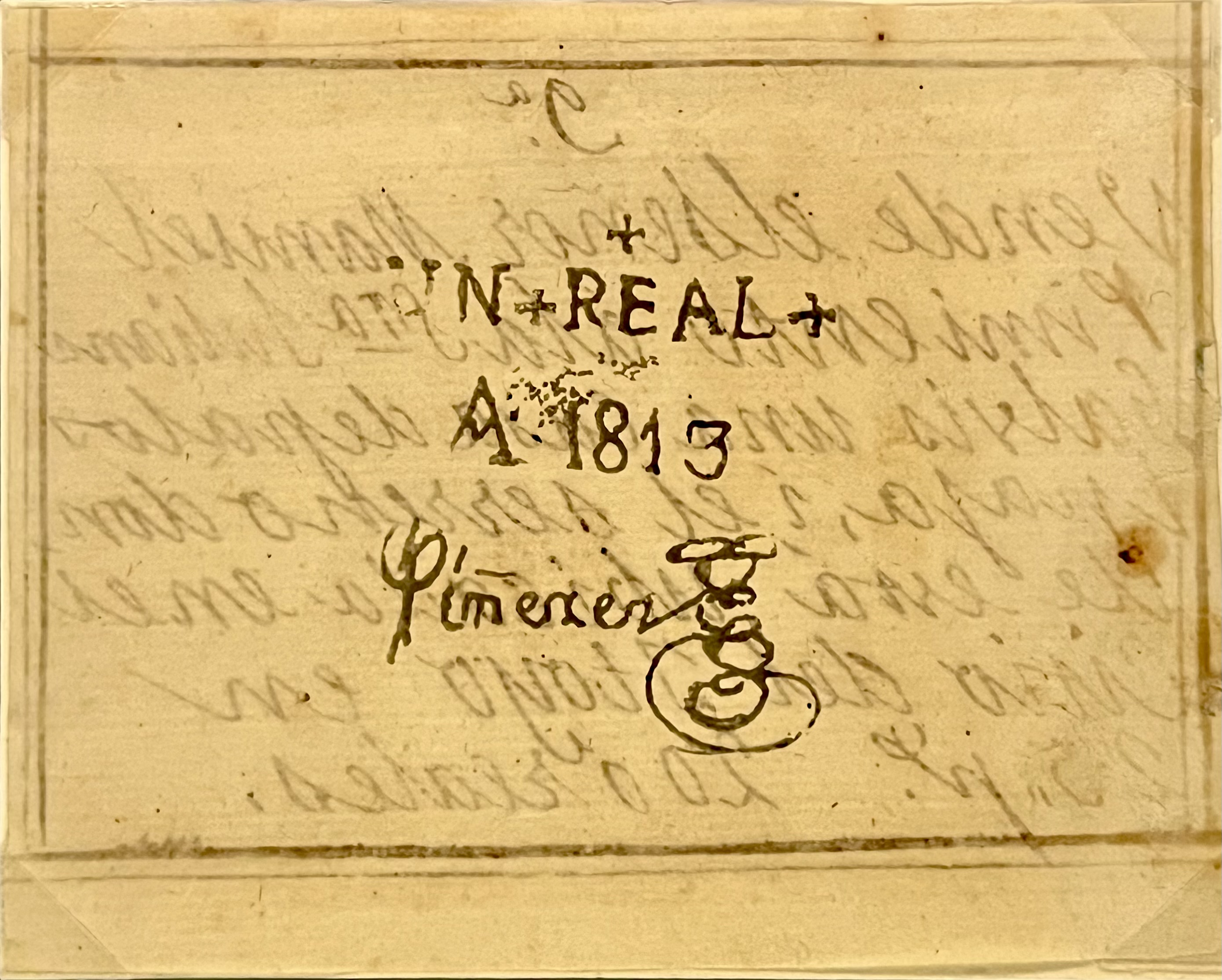
Un real banknote from Mompox, 1813

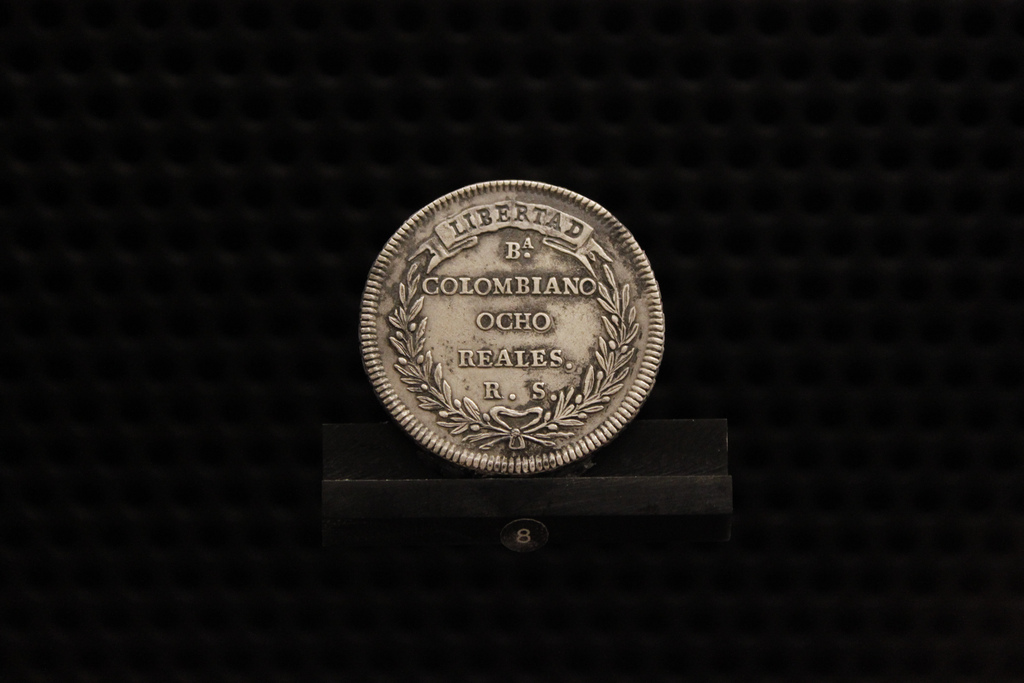
8 Colombian reales

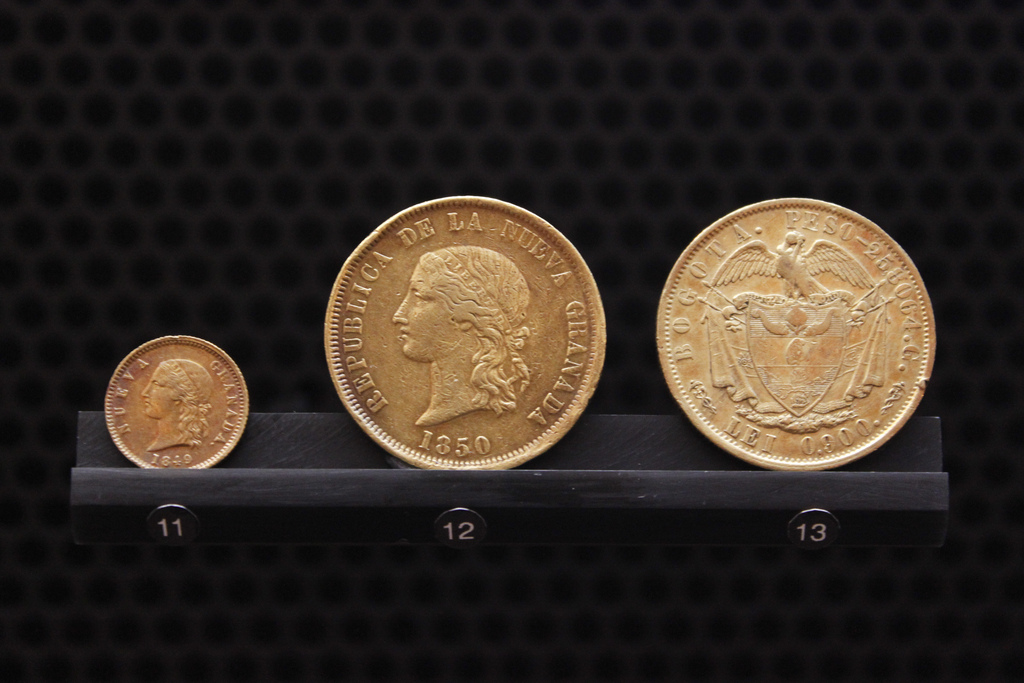
Early Colombian peso coins, 1850s

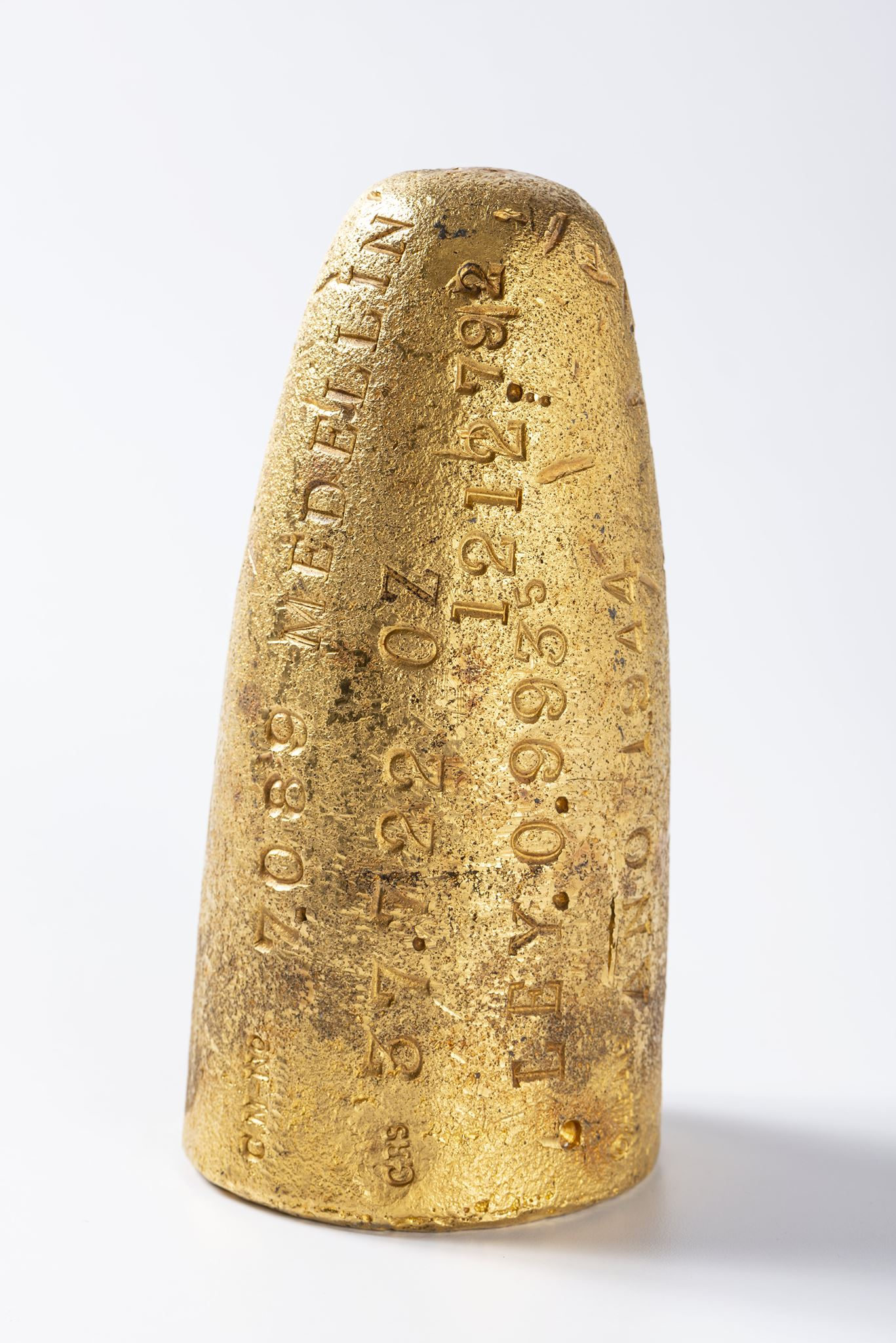
Gold bar from the Medellín Mint in shape of a projectile, 1944

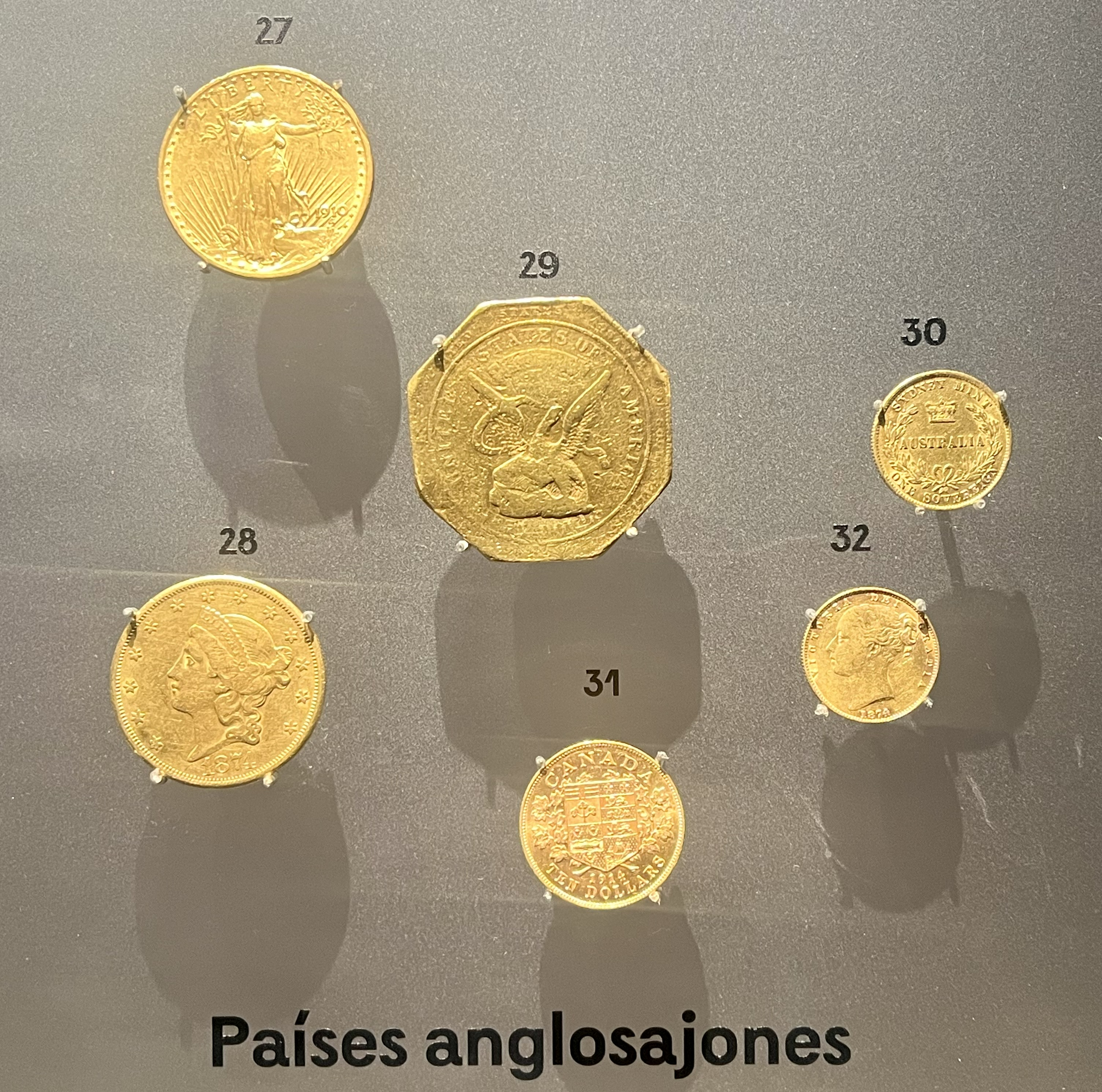
Gold bullion coins from various Anglosphere nations

== See also ==
- List of numismatic collections
- List of Mints
