= Bank of the Republic (Colombia) =

Central bank of Colombia

Coordinates: 4°36′05″N 74°04′22″W

Bank of the Republic Banco de la República
- Official Seal of the Banco de la República

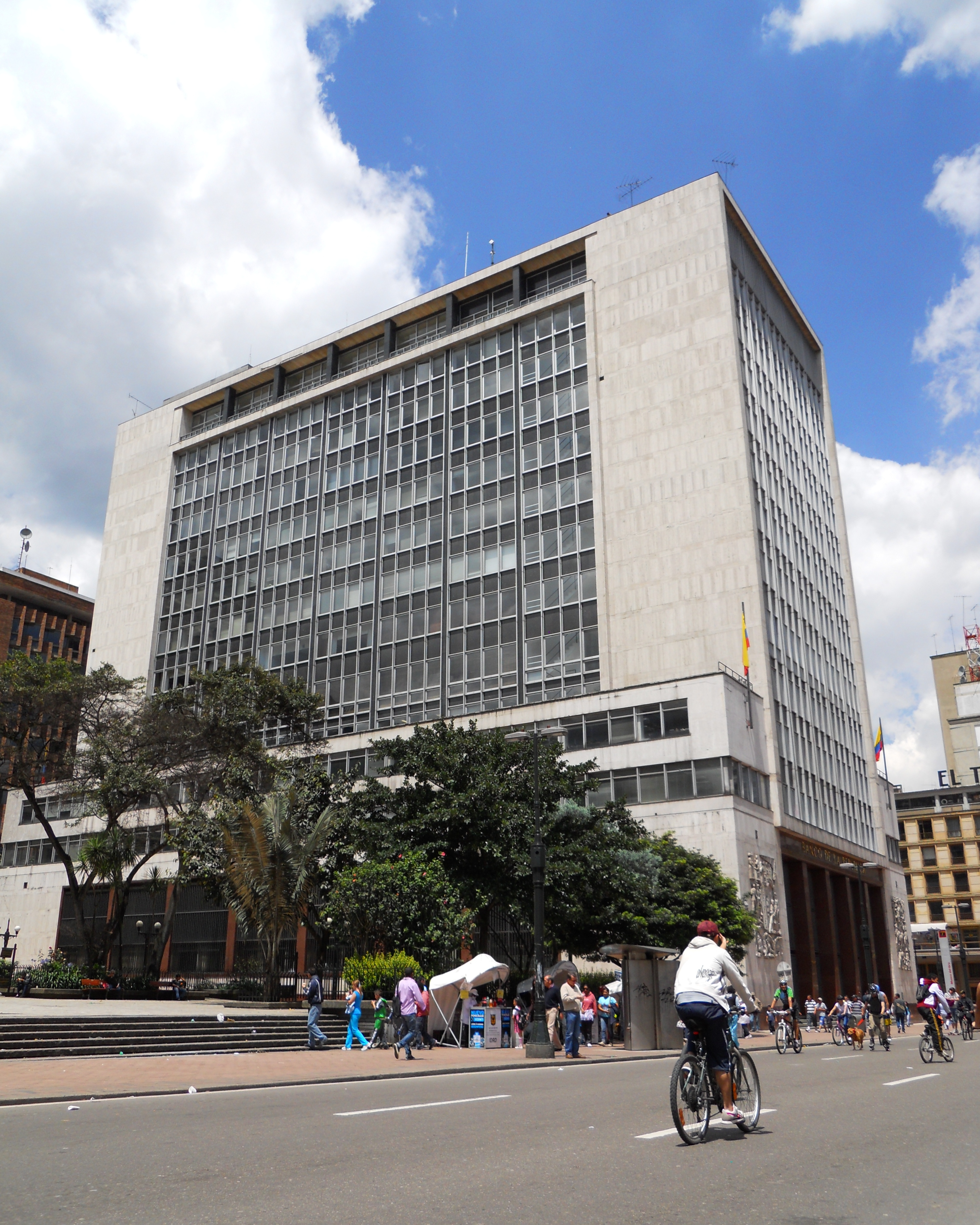
- Headquarters of the Banco de la República, in Bogotá, Colombia
- Central bank of: Colombia
- Headquarters: Bogotá, Colombia
- Ownership: 100% state ownership
- Governor: Leonardo Villar
- Currency: Colombian peso COP (ISO 4217)
- Reserves: 44 780 million USD
- Bank rate: 9.25%
- Website: www.banrep.gov.co/en/

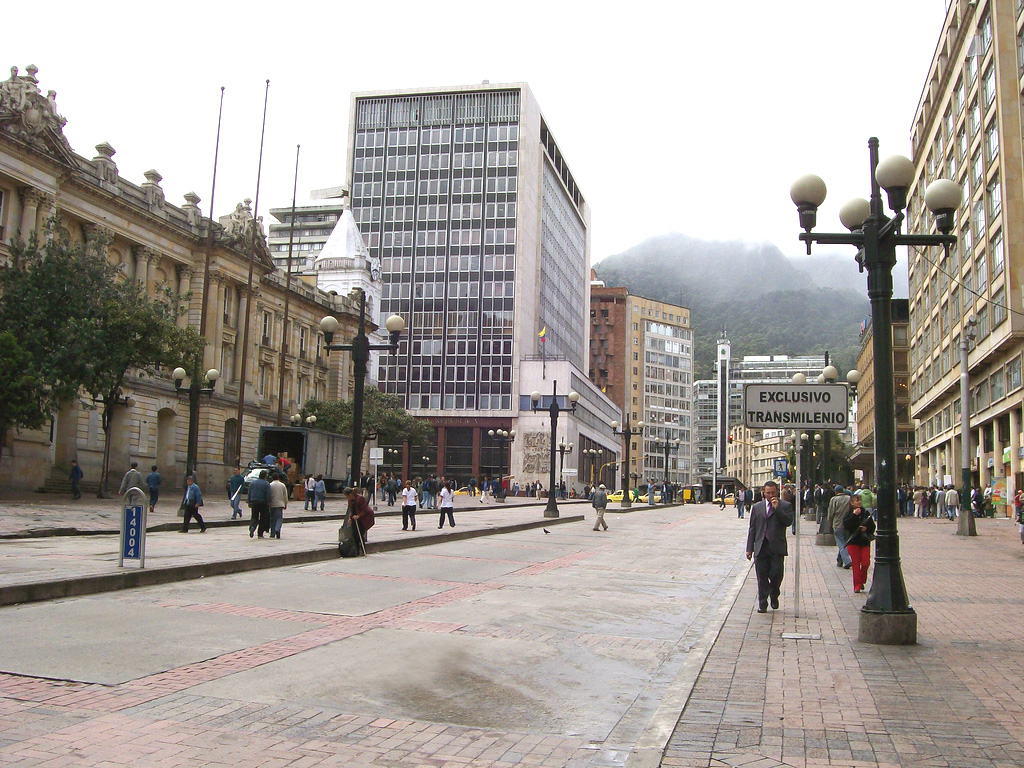
Banco de la República in Bogota at Jimenez Avenue

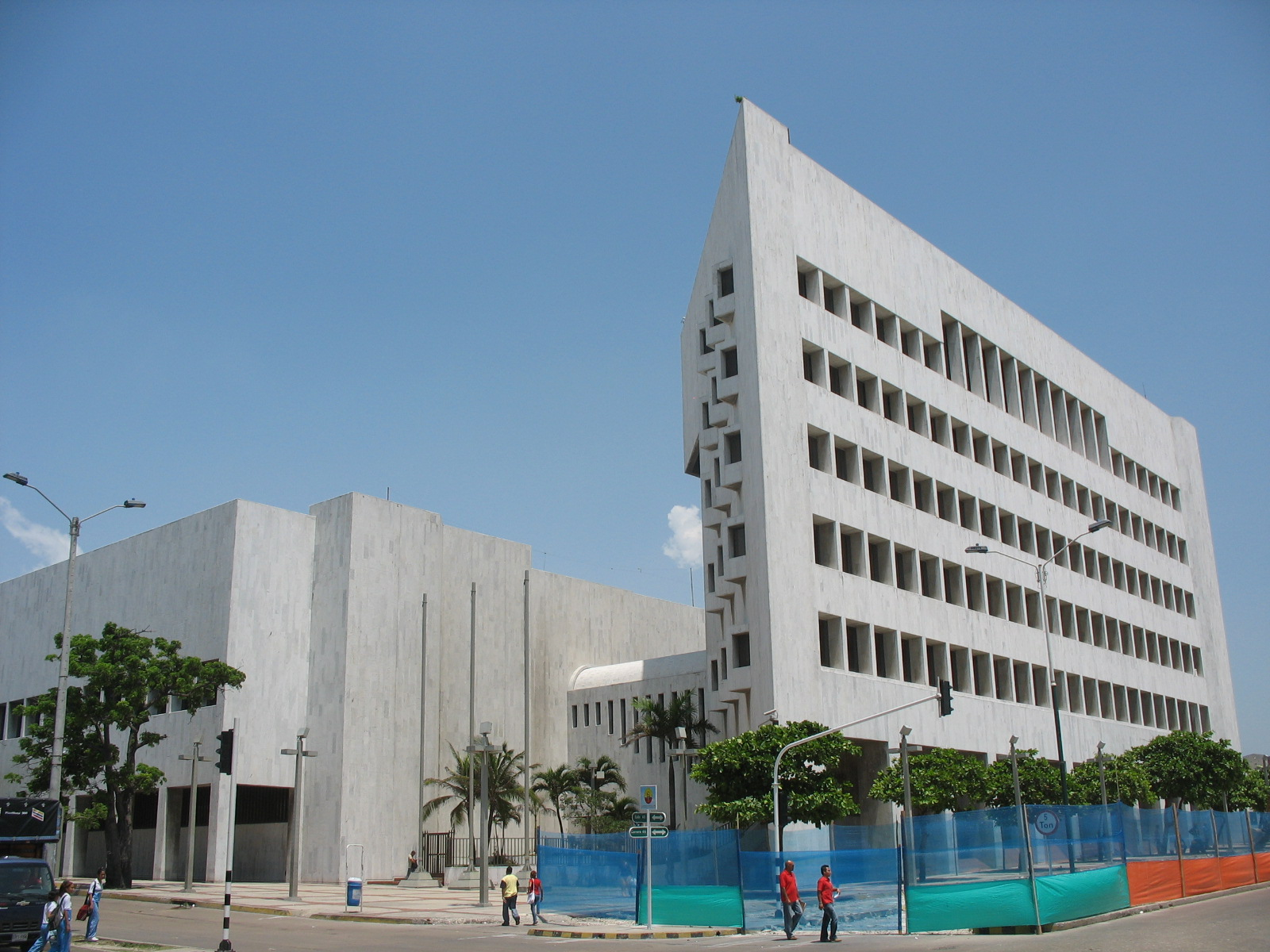
Banco de la República at Barranquilla.

The Bank of the Republic (Spanish: Banco de la República) is the central bank of Colombia. It was initially established under the regeneration era in 1880. Its main modern functions, under the new Colombian constitution were detailed by Congress in 1992. One of them is the issuance of the Colombian currency, the peso. The bank is also active in promoting financial inclusion policy and is a leading member of the Alliance for Financial Inclusion.

== History ==
There are at least three predecessors to the current bank. The first one was created in 1880, named the Banco Nacional, and its functions included handling the state funds, issuing currency and making loans to the state. In 1894 the Congress closed the bank due to registered excesses in the issuance of currency and bonds. In 1905 the president Rafael Reyes created the Banco Central de Colombia but it was closed in 1910 by Reyes opponents.

In 1923, after several years of financial crisis, President Pedro Nel Ospina requested an expert committee to study Colombian economic conditions. This committee, led by American economist Edwin Walter Kemmerer (referred to in an expression of the time as a money doctor) was called the Mission Kemmerer. Kemmerer had already worked with Latin American governments: that of Mexico in 1917 and of Guatemala in 1919. He helped the Colombian government create the Banco de la República and the Office of the Comptroller General of the Republic, and to structure the laws for this function using those already existing. After his work in Colombia, Kemmerer did the same for other Latin American governments, like Chile in 1925, Ecuador in 1926 and Peru in 1931.

The bank was officially chartered by the Law 25 of July 25, 1923, 5 days after the 113 anniversary of the Independence of Colombia. With an initial capital of 10 million dollars in gold, half provided by the government and the rest by foreign and national commercial banks. Its role as a banker for banks includes:

- Acting as a State Bank
- Controlling the issue of the currency, the Colombian peso
- Receiving foreign credits and make loans to the Government and private banks
- Managing the financial policy of the country
- Regulating the exchange rate between the peso and other currencies

The Board of Directors was created by the same law, with ten members from private and public sectors of the economy with the power to enforce regulatory and monetary controls. The Board was also given the responsibility of establishing the discount rate and intervening to control interest rates.

== Buildings ==
The headquarters of the Banco de la República are located in Bogotá, in the historical center of the city (Calle 11 No. 4-21) and a few blocks away from the Gold Museum and the Luis Ángel Arango Library. Along with the Fiscalía General de la Nación de Colombia bunker, it is one of the most secure buildings in the country, with several security levels required to access different areas. The security is handled by private companies and the Colombian National Police, armed with Colombian-made MAC-10 sub-machine guns, among others. Most of the administrative areas of the bank are located above ground, in a twelve-story building. Below the street there is a heavily guarded area where money in different currencies is stored, and in a special vault the country's reserve of gold.

Per Law 31 of 1992, the Bank of the Republic owns and manages both the Central de Efectivo in Bogotá and the Fábrica de Moneda in Ibagué which are respectively used to print banknotes and mint coins.

== Governors ==
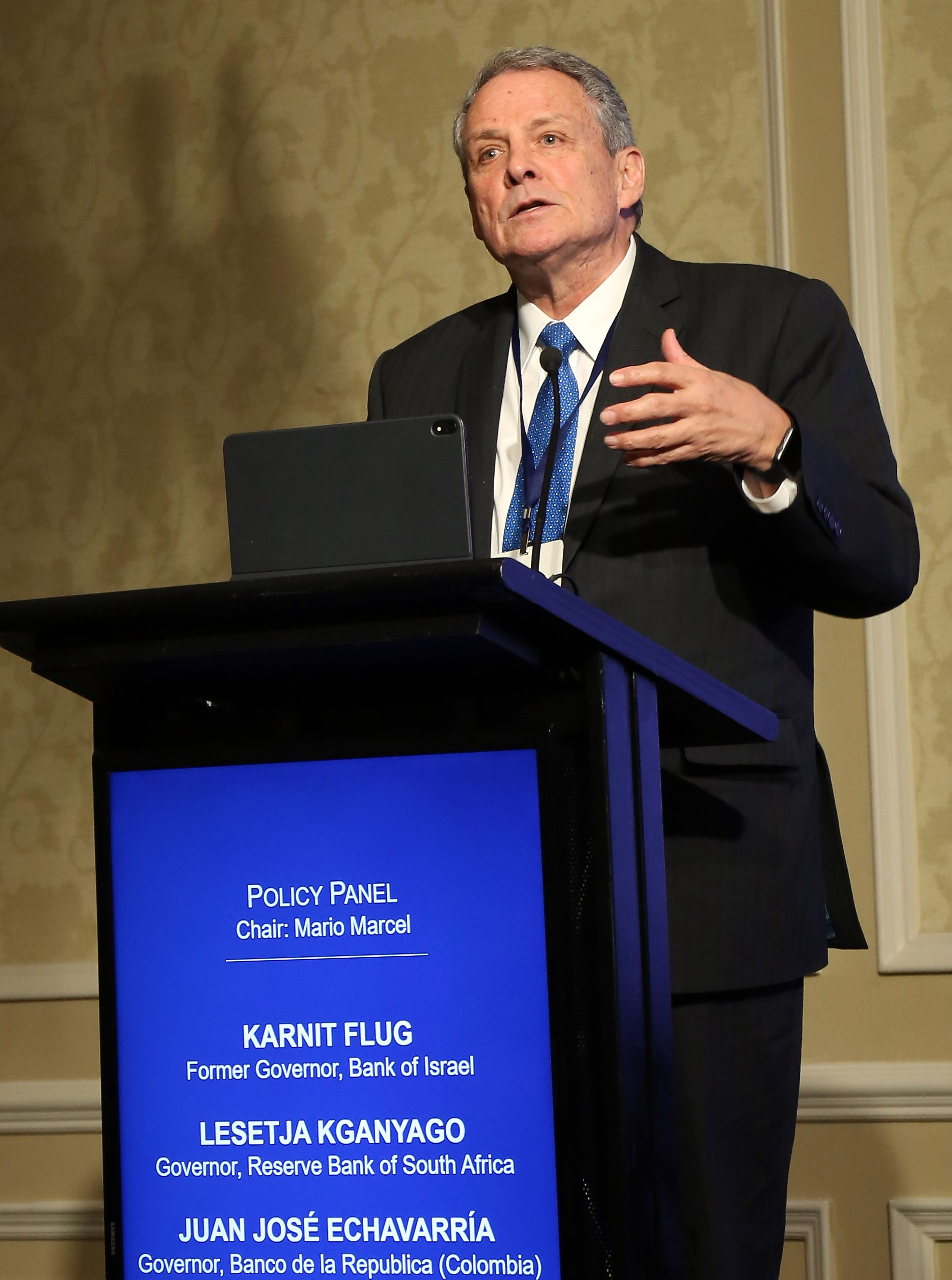
Juan José Echavarría

Governors of the Bank of the Republic
Name	Term
José Joaquín Pérez	1923 - 1924
Félix Salazar Jaramillo	1924 - 1927
Julio Caro	1927 - 1947
Luis Ángel Arango	1947 - 1957
Carlos Mario Londoño	1957
Ignacio Copete Lizarralde	September 1957 - February 1960
Jorge Cortés Boshell (interim)	February 1960 - December 1960
Eduardo Arias Robledo	January 1961 - October 1969
Germán Botero de los Ríos	October 1969 - August 1978
Rafael Gamma Quijano	August 1978 - August 1982
Hugo Palacios Mejía	September 1982 - September 1985
Francisco J. Ortega	October 1985 - February 1993
Miguel Urrutia Montoya	February 1993 - January 2005
José Darío Uribe	January 2005 - January 2017
Juan José Echavarría	January 2017 - December 2020
Leonardo Villar	January 2021 -

== Cultural administration ==
Beside their primary roles in the Colombian economy, the Banco de la República runs an extensive culture-preservation and dissemination program. It runs two important institutions in Colombian culture: the Gold Museum in Bogotá and the Luis Ángel Arango Library, but in addition, it runs other five Gold Museums (Armenia, Cali, Cartagena, Pasto, and Santa Marta); the Leticia Ethnographic Museum; the Gómez Campuzano House in Bogotá; a 28-city Library Network; a Concert Hall in the Arango Library; and three museums in Bogotá, namely, the Museo Casa de Moneda, the Botero Museum, and the Miguel Urrutia Art Museum (MAMU).

Also, the Bank has two scholarship programs for the best researchers in Economics (Lauchlin Currie Scholarship) and in Economic Law (Enrique Low Murtra Scholarship).

=== Banrepcultural ===
The online presence of all the museum sites, plus an encyclopaedia, plus an online library, is called "Banrepcultural", a portmanteau for Red Cultural del Banco de la República en Colombia. It calls itself "the oldest virtual library in Latin America", and uses the domain banrepcultural.org.

== See also ==
- Robbery on the Bank of the Republic, a robbery happened in 1994 in the Valledupar branch
- List of central banks
