= Gypsy with Tambourine =

Painting by Jean-Baptiste-Camille Corot

- Gitane au tambourin (French)
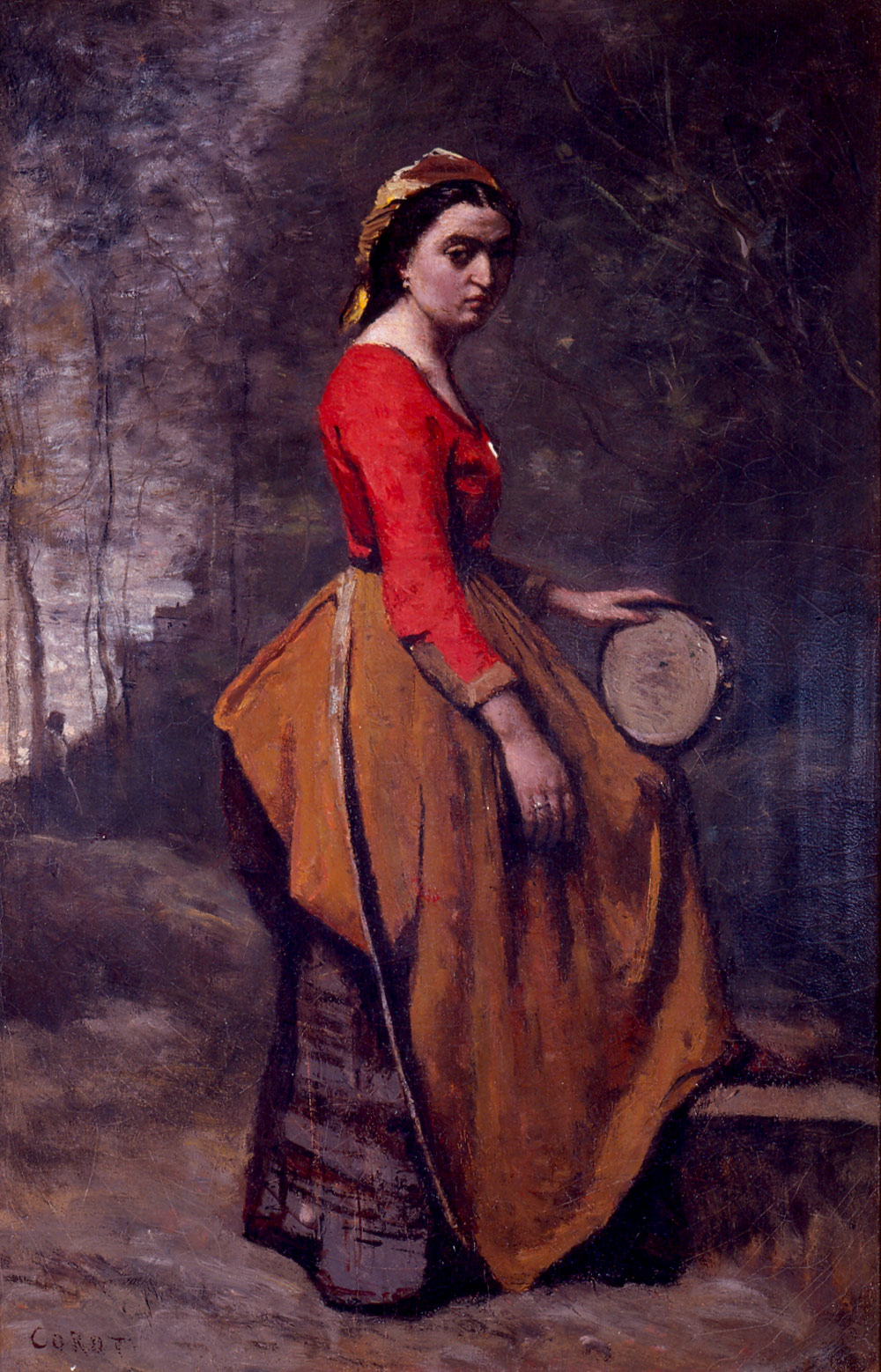
- Artist: Jean-Baptiste-Camille Corot
- Year: c. 1862
- Catalogue: AP3259
- Medium: Oil on canvas
- Dimensions: 59 cm × 38 cm (23 in × 15 in)
- Location: Museo Botero, Bogotá D.C.
- Owner: Banco de la República
- Accession: 2000

Gypsy with Tambourine (French: Gitane au tambourin) is an oil-on-canvas painting by French painter Jean-Baptiste-Camille Corot. Executed c. 1862, it is now held in the collection of the Bank of the Republic and exhibited at the Museo Botero, in Bogotá.

== Description ==
The painting, which is described as a portrait, was painted by Corot circa 1862. It depicts a woman dressed in bright red and yellow colors posing with a tambourine, elements typical of Romani culture. In the background, an unknown individual can be observed walking towards the main subject along an unpaved path surrounded by woodlands.

== Historical information ==
Towards the end of Camille Corot's life, the artist was knowned to have invited Italian models to his studio, dressed them in traditional Modern Greek or Italian costumes, and painted them. Corot would then later add an imaginary landscape in the background. In Gitane au tambourin, the artist highlights the vivid red and yellow colors of the dress, as well as the social reality of the Romani people, wandering individuals strongly linked to music. Corot highlights this situation in the painting, placing the dressed woman on a path that leads to the entrance of an unknown city, alluding to the movement and dynamism of the Rom.

== Provenance ==
Fernando Botero, an avid art collector, acquired the painting from a Christie's auction. In 2000, Botero donated the painting to the Bank of the Republic to form the Museo Botero along with 207 other paintings and sculptures.

Per Resolution 565, of 16 April 2012, of the Ministry of Culture of Colombia, the entirety of the Fernando Botero collection, including Gitane au tambourin, was voted on by the National Council of Cultural Heritage as an asset of cultural interest for the nation.

The painting had previously been part of Gerald Reitlinger's private art collection.

== Bibliography ==
- Robaut, Alfred. (1905). L'oeuvre de Corot. Paris. Lagare Street Press. ISBN 9781017208900
- Caballero, Antonio. (2002). Colección Botero: en primera persona del singular. Bogotá: Banco de la República de Colombia. ISBN 958-664-102-3
- Bonet, Juan Manuel. (2021). Museo Botero. Bogotá: Banco de la República de Colombia. ISBN 978-958-664-419-8
