= The Hangover (Suzanne Valadon) =

1889 painting by Henri de Toulouse-Lautrec

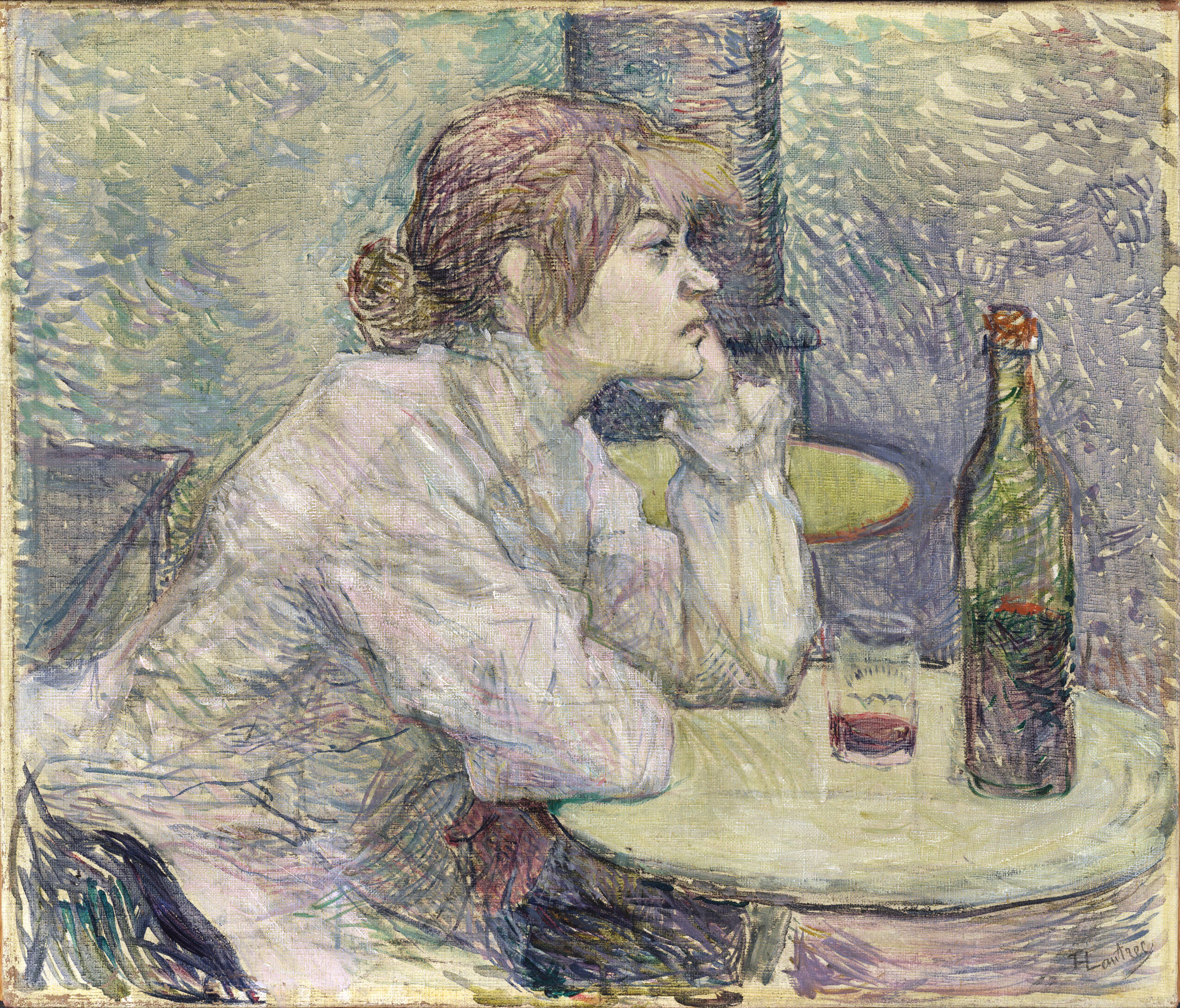
- Artist: Henri de Toulouse-Lautrec
- Year: 1887–1889
- Medium: oil on canvas
- Movement: Post-Impressionism
- Dimensions: 47 cm × 55 cm (19 in × 22 in)
- Location: Fogg Museum; Cambridge, Massachusetts, U.S.

The Hangover (Suzanne Valadon) (French: Gueule de Bois), also known as The Drinker (French: La Buveuse), is a late 1880s, oil-on-canvas painting by French artist Henri de Toulouse-Lautrec. The painting was created just before he became successful as an artist. It depicts a drunken woman drinking alone in a club, reflecting the counterculture of Montmartre and the spectre of alcoholism among French women during the Belle Époque. The model in The Hangover is artist Suzanne Valadon, Lautrec's lover. (Note: At the time, such a lover was referred to as a "mistress" instead of "girlfriend". In the 21st century, the word "mistress" is used primarily to refer to the female companion of a man who is married to another woman. See mistress (lover) for details.) In the early 1880s, after falling from a circus trapeze at the age of 15 and suffering a back injury, Valadon began working as an art model in Montmartre. She had been drawing all her life, but now she pursued a career as an artist, becoming the first woman painter admitted to the Société Nationale des Beaux-Arts.

French cabaret singer and nightclub owner Aristide Bruant is thought to have influenced the development of the painting and possibly even its title. Lautrec's technique is loosely reminiscent of both the color theory of Neo-Impressionism and the technique of Lautrec's art school friend Vincent van Gogh. The work was preceded by several preparatory studies followed by a drawing in ink and chalk that was later published in Le Courrier français in 1889. Lautrec drank copious amounts of alcohol to deal with pain from his assumed underlying genetic disorder which left him disabled. Alcoholism and the syphilis he later acquired due to his habit of frequenting brothels would later contribute to his death at the young age of 36.

The work was on permanent exhibition at Le Mirliton in the late 1880s and early 1890s. It was first exhibited in the United States at the Armory Show in 1913. It is now held by the Fogg Museum, while the study and drawing are both held by the Musée Toulouse-Lautrec. The Hangover is one of several different works by Lautrec featuring Suzanne Valadon, including Maria Big with Child (1884) in the Von der Heydt Museum, Portrait of Suzanne Valadon (1885) in the Museo Nacional de Bellas Artes, Portrait of the Painter Suzanne Valadon (1885) in the Ny Carlsberg Glyptotek, and Rice Powder (1887) in the Van Gogh Museum.

== Background ==
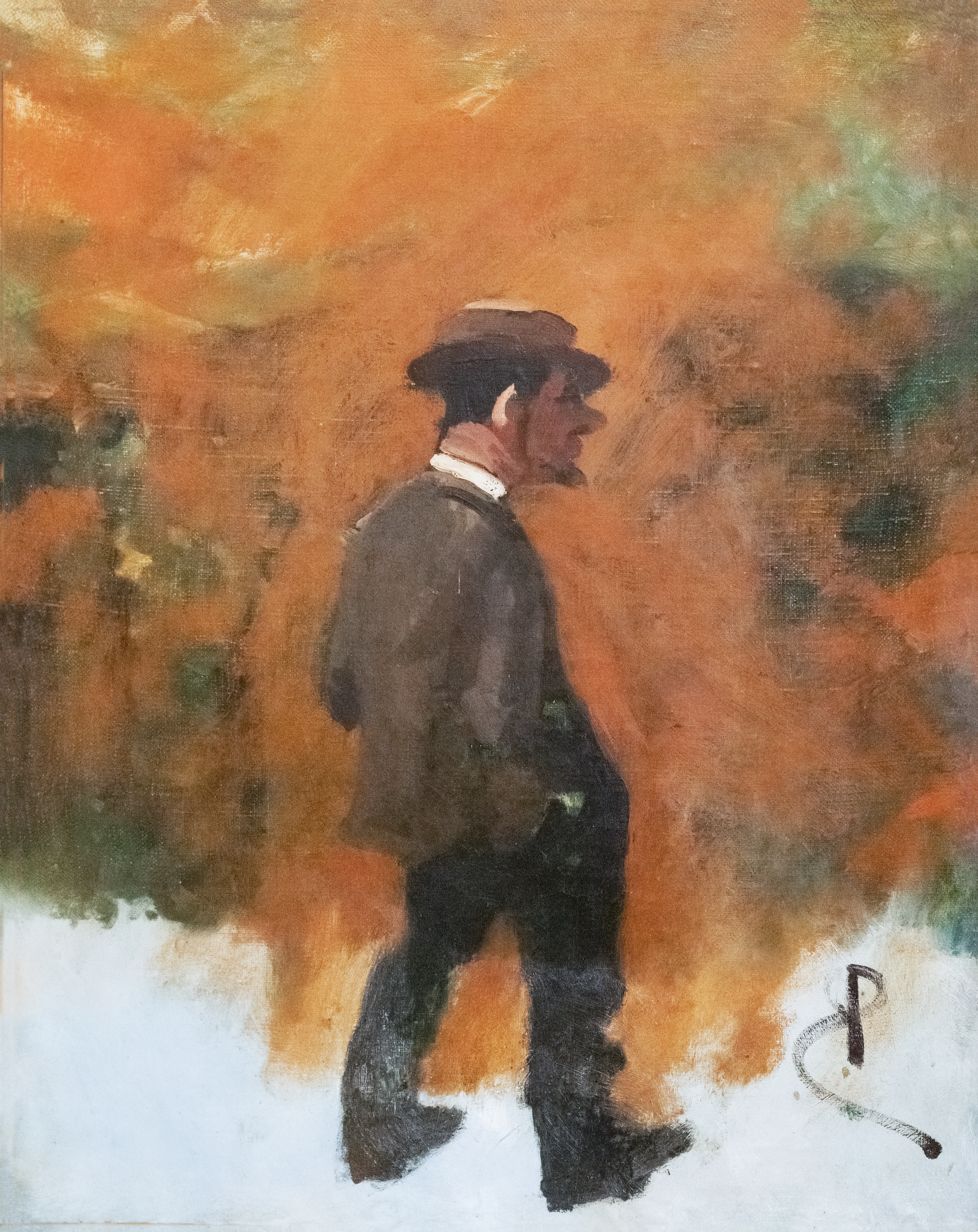
Henri de Toulouse-Lautrec at 19 (1883) by René Princeteau

Henri de Toulouse-Lautrec (1864–1901) came from an aristocratic family related to the counts of Toulouse. Originally from Albi in southern France, his parents separated when he was young and he later moved to Paris with his mother. Lautrec was disabled, possibly due to a genetic disorder known as pycnodysostosis. His birth parents were cousins, so there is speculation that his health problems came about due to their intermarriage. Lautrec's legs remained child-sized, but his torso continued to grow as an adult. He required a cane to walk, and he did so hunched over, which invited derogatory comments about his appearance. Lautrec's father hired deaf and mute artist René Princeteau as his art tutor in his teenage years; the young Lautrec learned by copying Princeteau's work, much of which was focused on sports, hunting, and horses. Princeteau helped Lautrec get accepted into the Paris studio of Léon Bonnat at the age of 17, where he trained as a painter under Bonnat and Fernand Cormon. In the early to mid-1880s, Lautrec took up residence in Montmartre, first moving to 19 bis rue Pierre-Fontaine around 1884, then later back to a different unit in the same building in 1887. Montmartre was well known for its connection to the arts since the 12th-century reign of Louis VI, who was a notable patron. The attraction of jobs and low rents brought many people to the district. In the late 19th century, Montmartre was inhabited by "small tradesmen, entertainers, petty criminals, prostitutes, artists ... those of Spanish, Flemish – even northern French – descent ... poor workers, mattress menders and circus performers ... factory workers, seamstresses, laundresses and artisans".

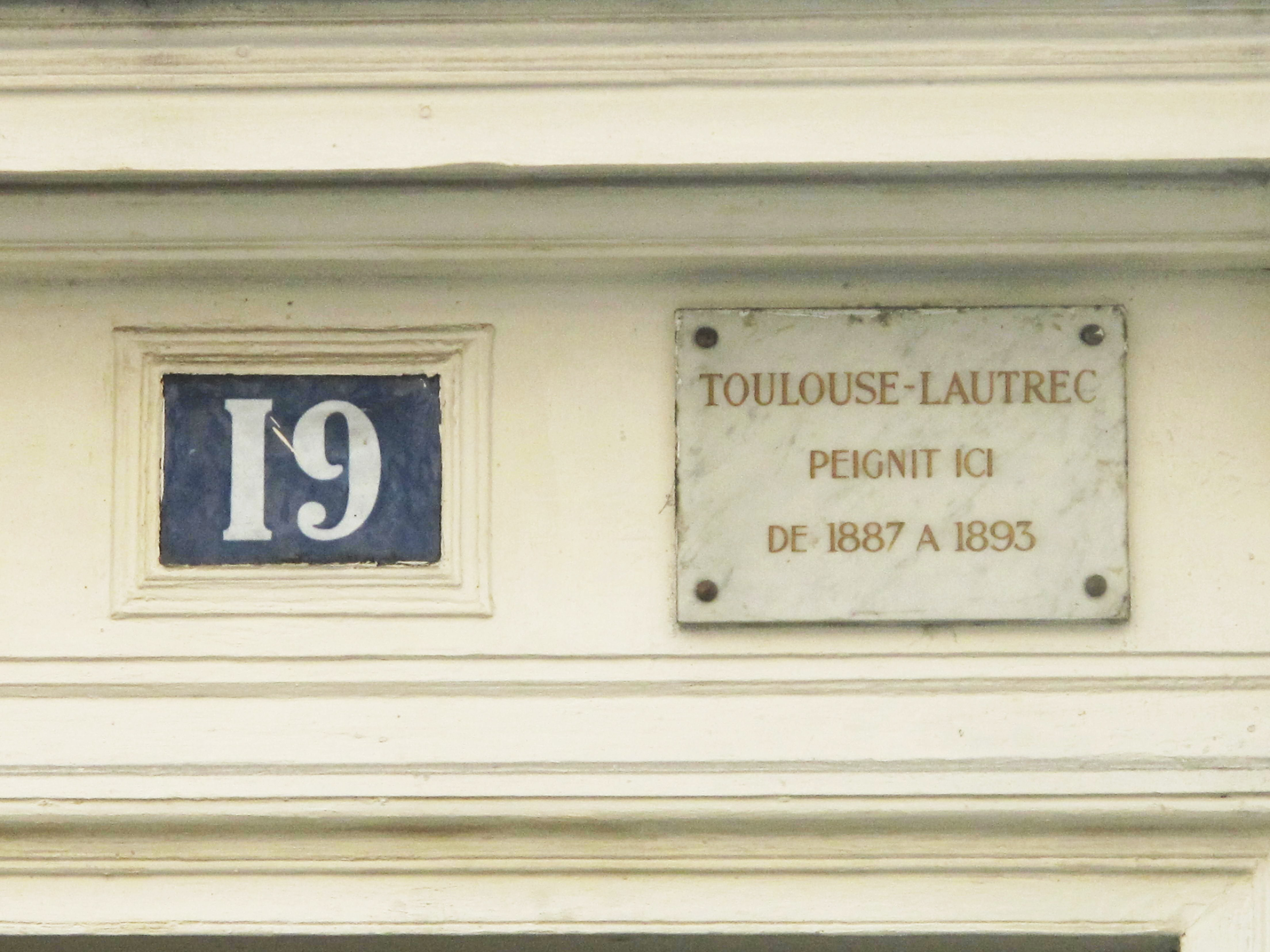
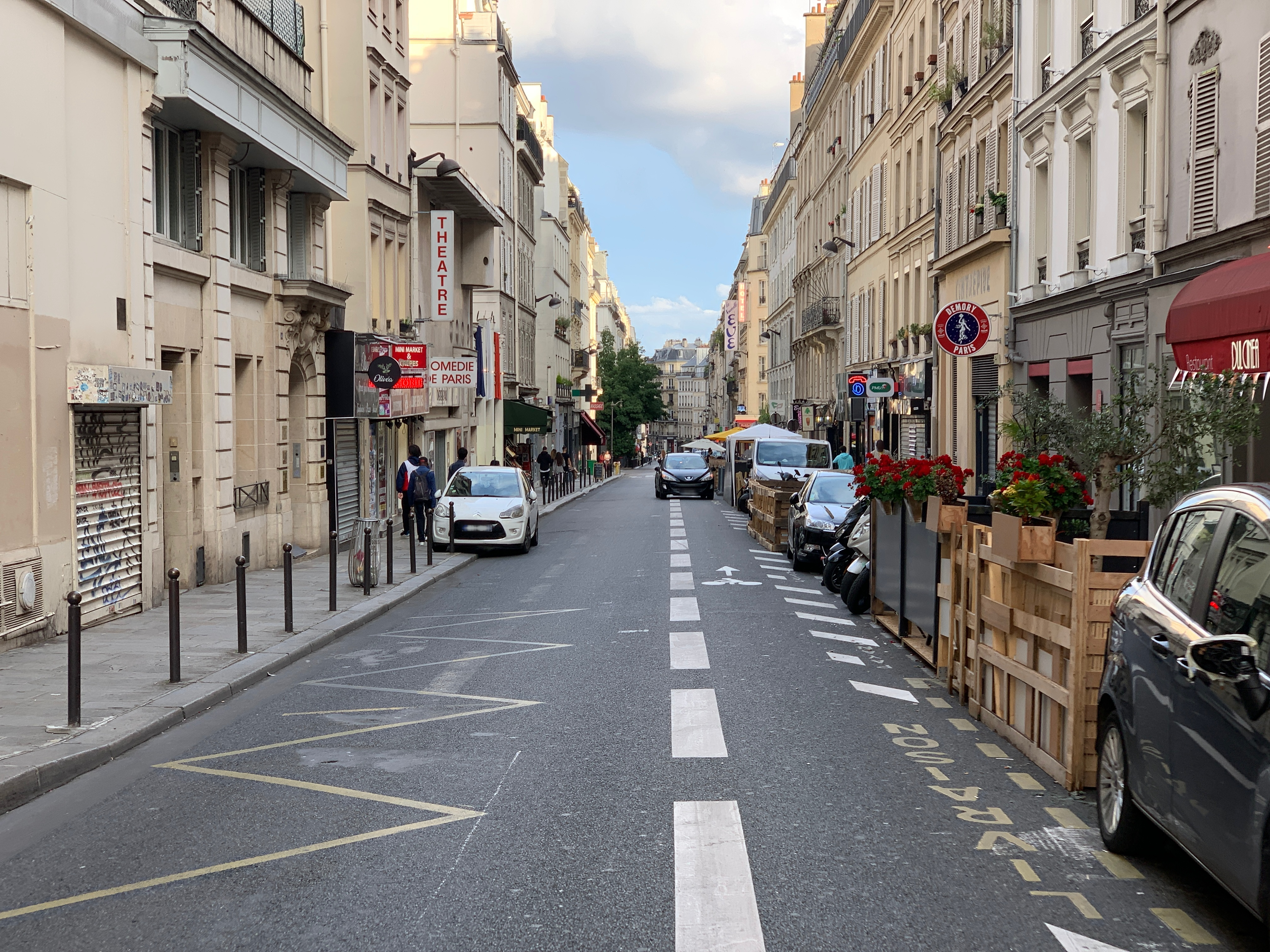
Top: 19 bis rue Pierre-Fontaine; Bottom: Street view

Between 1884 and 1889, French laundress Carmen Gaudin modeled for Lautrec for some 15 paintings. In the late 1880s, Lautrec began working on a series of large paintings based on the Cirque Fernando, a popular French circus in Montmartre. His friend and colleague, Italian Impressionist painter Federico Zandomeneghi (1841–1917), recommended his own model, Marie-Clémentine Valadon, who had begun working as an art model after injuring herself as a circus trapeze artist at the age of 15. At the same time, nightclub owner Aristide Bruant opened Le Mirliton in 1885, a popular cabaret where both Valadon and Lautrec mingled. Taking Zandomeneghi up on his offer, Lautrec hired Valadon to pose for one of his circus scenes which he then expanded into a larger series. Lautrec's circus works show Valadon riding side-saddle on a horse as she is about to dive through a hoop held by a clown. They were later prominently featured at the Moulin Rouge, and were said to be so influential that it led Georges Seurat (1859–1891), Pierre Bonnard (1867–1947), and Pablo Picasso (1881–1973) to try their hand at similar circus scenes in homage to Lautrec. By that time, Valadon had already modeled for Pierre Puvis de Chavannes and Pierre-Auguste Renoir. Lautrec famously parodied Puvis' painting of The Sacred Grove, Beloved of the Arts and Muses. Valadon, as it turns out, was the original model for most of the figures in that painting. Sociologist Janet M.C. Burns of the University of New Brunswick notes that "it was Toulouse-Lautrec who first encouraged [Valadon's] intellectual and artistic development". He was the first person to buy her artwork and he also gave her the idea to change her name from Marie to "Suzanne".

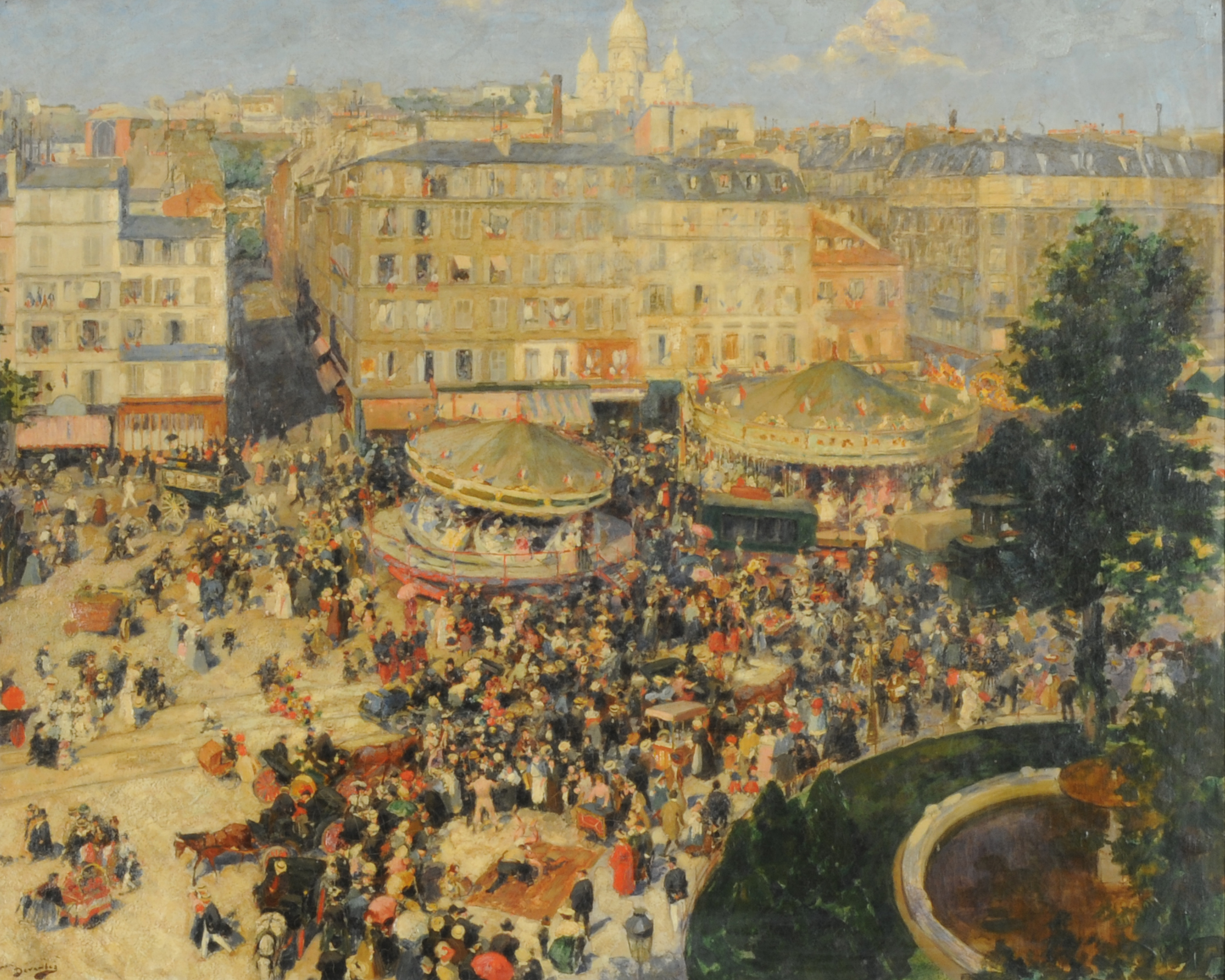
Place Pigalle, lower Montmartre

Historian Patrick Bade argues that Lautrec was an outsider as a disabled man in 19th-century, aristocratic French society, where he could "no longer follow the traditional outdoor pastimes of his class—notably hunting". Lautrec's father was said to have spurned his son over his disability, making it clear that he valued the skills of horsemanship, hunting, and soldiering in the family, things Lautrec could not do. "[H]is own sense of 'otherness' resulting from his physical appearance and infirmities gave him a strong empathy with those who would have been regarded by many of his contemporaries as deviants", writes Bade. The outsider French subculture of sex work held a special appeal for Lautrec. Biographer Julia Frey believes that Lautrec was partly attracted to prostitutes as a form of rebellion against his deeply religious and controlling mother. Lautrec became obsessed with brothels (maisons closes) and his commercial work for venues like the Moulin Rouge, where prostitutes worked in secret behind closed doors, gave him easy access. He completed around 50 works featuring prostitution (including the Elles series, 1896), most of which were not widely known until after his death. Art historian Hollis Clayson maintains that Lautrec was responsible for forging the connection between prostitution and fin-de-siècle French art.

By the 1890s, the successful cabaret scene began to experience a downturn due to its eventual exploitation. Le Mirliton closed in 1897, bringing the Montmartre countercultural era to an end. Lautrec moved to Place Pigalle, lower Montmartre, in 1897, residing in an apartment at 15 Av. He sank deeper into the depths of alcohol abuse in his final years, using a hollowed-out walking cane surreptitiously filled with alcohol, complete with a hidden glass, to hide his drinking from his family. In March 1899, Lautrec's family had him "kidnapped" while he was drunk to try and treat his alcohol problem. When he awoke, he found himself in a locked room in the Chateau Saint-James asylum. Several months later, he was released, but his health continued to get worse. In 1901, he died at his family home from complications presumably related to alcoholism and tertiary syphilis at the age of 36.

== Development ==
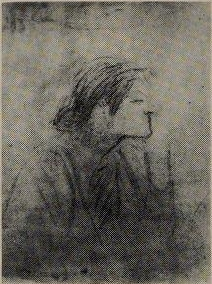
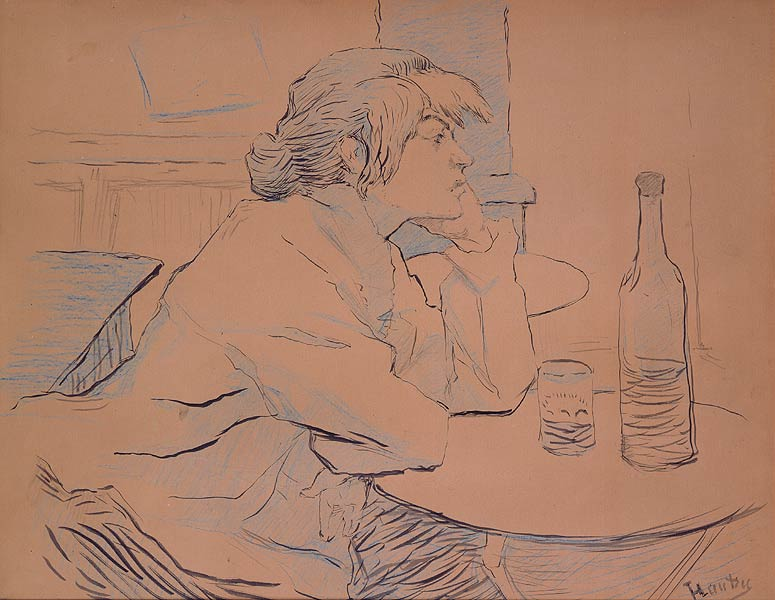
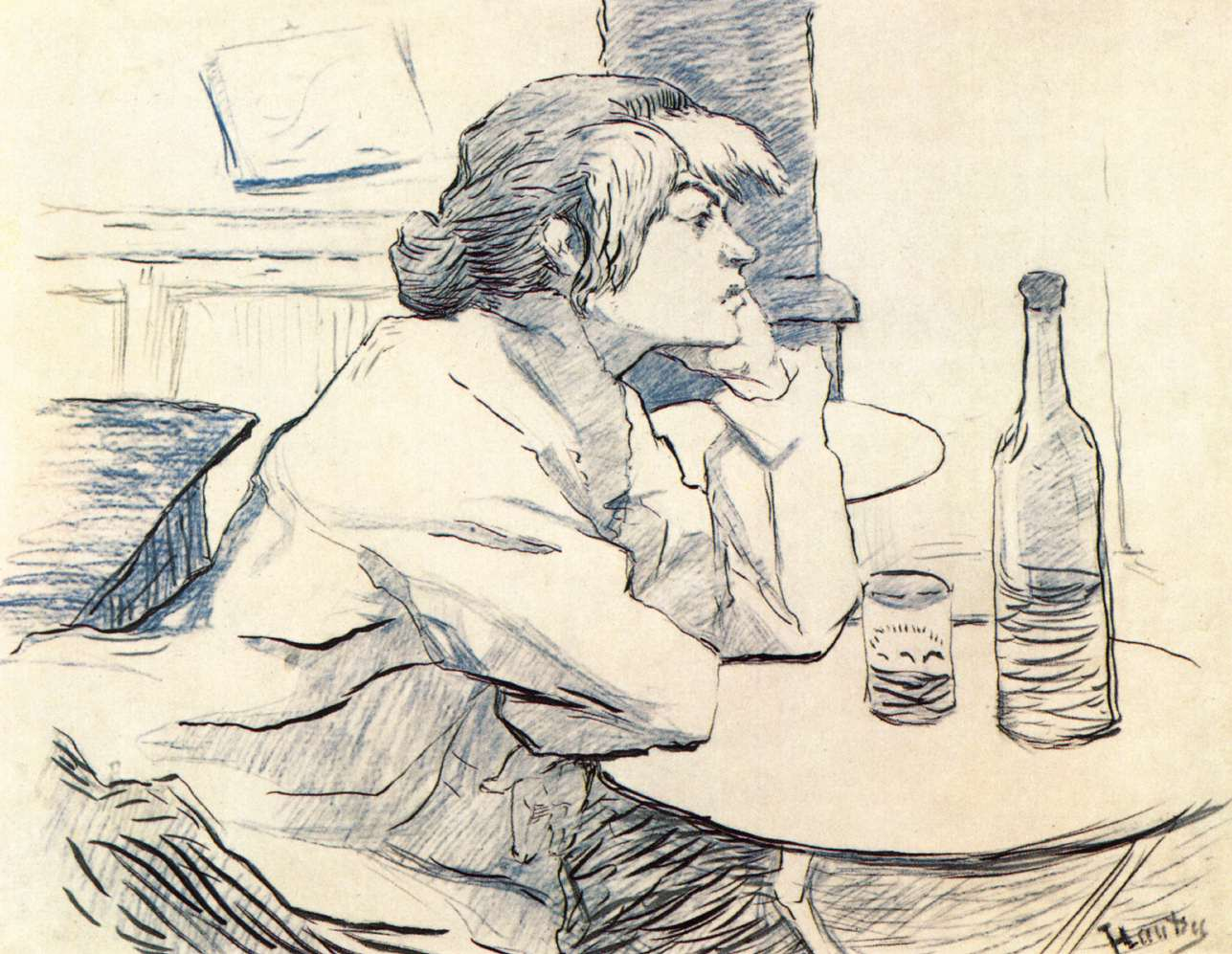
Top: Preparatory study; Middle: Preparatory study; Bottom: Drawing

Toulouse-Lautrec's friendship with singer and nightclub owner Aristide Bruant is thought to have influenced his development of The Hangover. Lautrec explored the then popular theme of women drinking alone in cafes in several works directly related to the lyrics of Bruant's chanson réaliste, songs that touched on the lives of poor working class women, often waitresses or prostitutes, and very often both. Waiting (c. 1887) and A la Bastille (Jeanne Wenz) (1888) are two portraits Lautrec completed based on songs by Bruant featuring the theme of women drinking alone. While The Hangover addresses the same themes found in Lautrec's earlier paintings based on Bruant's songs, and was one of ten works that were permanently exhibited at Bruant's nightclub, many of which were based on Bruant's lyrics, it is debated if The Hangover was based on a specific song or if it was given its title by Bruant. Art historian Gale B. Murray takes a skeptical position, writing "although it had no direct relationship to any of Bruant's lyrics, its picture of alcoholic dissipation and despondency corresponded to the song-writer's vocabulary". On the other hand, Frey asserts that Bruant was likely responsible for giving the painting its title.

Lautrec may have begun working on the painting sometime before February 1888. According to John Storm, Valadon modeled for The Hangover for fun and amusement, not as a paid modeling job. It was, Storm writes, "an experience they shared in high spirits, a little private joke that came as an aftermath of one of Lautrec's less inhibited parties". It is also believed that the relationship between Lautrec and Valadon was over sometime around or after February.

Van Gogh was present in Lautrec's studio when he began painting The Hangover, and he continued to show interest in its development. Art critic Henri Perruchot implies this was because Lautrec had borrowed elements from Van Gogh's technique of crosshatching. Previously, Lautrec had used Van Gogh's technique in his Portrait of Vincent van Gogh (1887), which depicts the artist with a glass of absinthe in a nightclub. Van Gogh was living in Arles in the summer of 1888. He wrote a letter to his brother asking about the painting, indicating he was still curious about what Lautrec was trying to do: "Has de Lautrec finished his picture of the woman leaning on her elbows on a little table in a café?" Perruchot argues that in its execution, The Hangover combines "the aesthetic influence of Van Gogh and the moral influence of Bruant". Art historian Jacques Lassaigne writes that "the influence of [Van Gogh's] technique is manifest".

== Description ==
A woman sits alone inside a cafe at one of two round tables near a pillar, leaning on the table with her elbows. Appearing in profile, her ear and forehead are hidden by her hair, tied back in a bun on her neck. A glass of wine, almost empty, sits in front of her, with a half-empty bottle next to it. She appears sickly or tired and is treating her hangover with more wine. Her white shirt identifies her as a working-class woman, likely a prostitute.

Throughout its history, the painting has been known by several titles. When the painting was first sold as part of the Maurice Masson collection in 1911, it appeared with the name La Buveuse (Gueule de Bois). At the Armory Show in 1913, the first large exhibition of modern art in the United States, it was shown with the title Woman Sitting at Table. In his 1969 catalogue raisonné, writer Gabriele Mandel referred to the title of the work as The Morning After or Woman Drinking.

== Themes ==
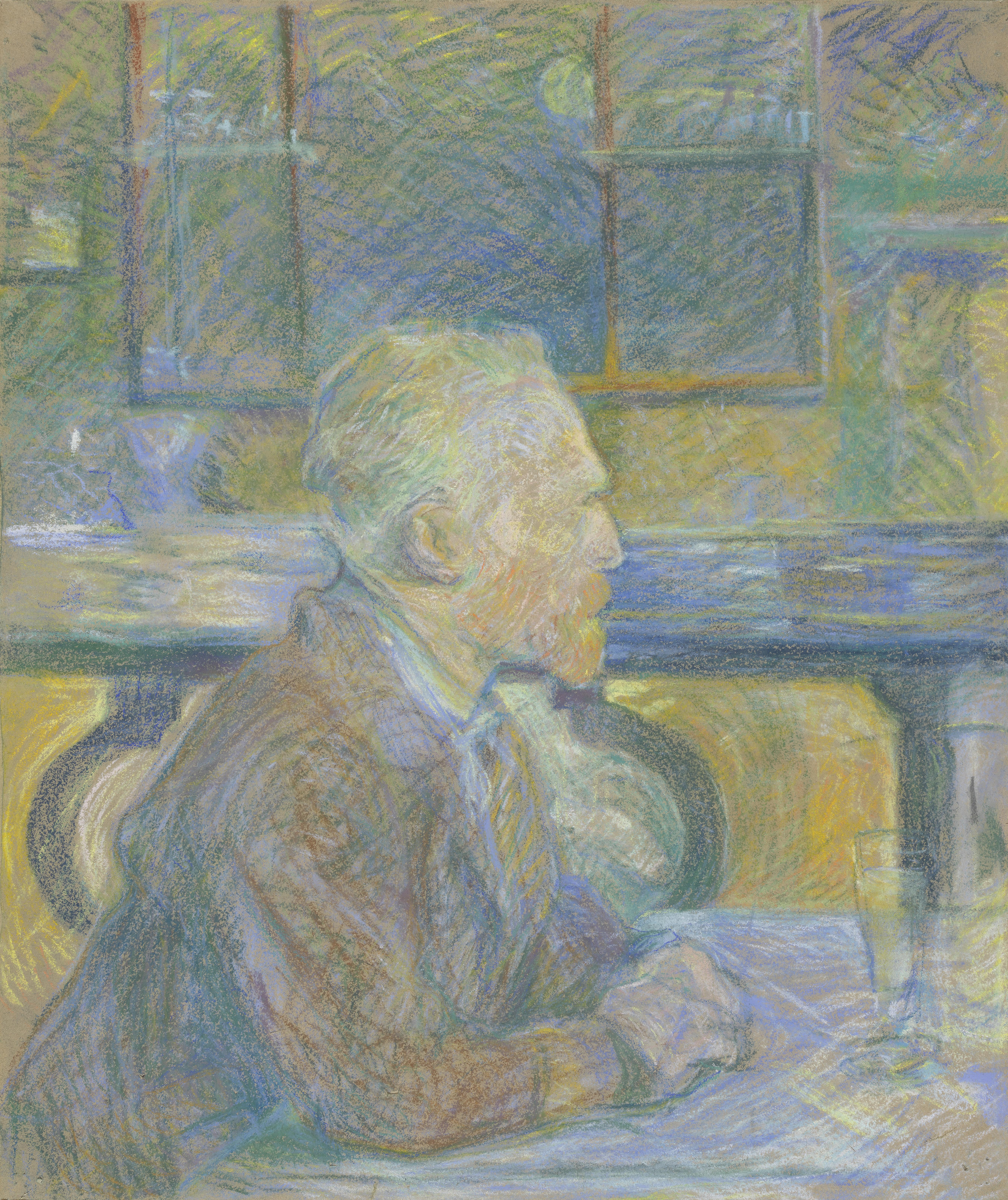
Portrait of Vincent van Gogh (1887)

The Hangover depicts a drunken woman drinking alone in a club, reflecting the counterculture of Montmartre and the specter of alcoholism among French women during the Belle Époque in the 1880s. The theme was well known to the French public at the time, having been popularized by Emile Zola in his book L'Assommoir (1877). Even before Zola published his novel, Toulouse-Lautrec was likely familiar with the theme in art, which Edgar Degas notably painted earlier in L'Absinthe (1875–76), followed by Édouard Manet covering the same ground with Plum Brandy (1877) the next year.

Art historian John Varriano highlights the rise of alcohol consumption during the emergence of modernism, and how its depiction changed in 19th-century French art. Haussmannization contributed to the rise of café and music culture, which brought foreigners and residents displaced by construction together to mingle, socialize, and drink. The French legislature deregulated the liquor industry in 1880, leading to what historian Matthew Ramsey describes as a "rapid growth in bars and other outlets". Champagne production almost doubled from 1850 to 1883, while wine consumption by Parisians tripled. "Increased consumption", writes Varriano, "led to increased dysfunction". Culinary historian Alexandra Leaf notes that by the end of the 19th century, Paris had 27,000 cafés, the highest number of retail business establishments serving alcoholic beverages in the world.

In terms of the artistic milieu, Jim Drobnick of OCAD University hypothesizes a kind of "inebriationism" to describe the use of alcohol for creative purposes that was popularized in the wake of Romanticism. Drobnick cites Arthur Rimbaud and Charles Baudelaire as major exponents of intoxication, which both Van Gogh (Note: A 2020 study in the International Journal of Bipolar Disorders argues that Vincent van Gogh "suffered from delirium associated with alcohol withdrawal in the years leading up to his suicide in 1890." See Selvin, Claire (November 3, 2020). "New Study Suggests van Gogh Suffered from 'Several Comorbid Disorders'". ARTNews. Retrieved July 20, 2024; Nolen, W.A., van Meekeren, E., Voskuil, P. et al. (2020). "New vision on the mental problems of Vincent van Gogh; results from a bottom-up approach using (semi-)structured diagnostic interviews." Int J Bipolar Disord. 8 (30): 1–9.) and Lautrec took advantage of when it came to using absinthe in the cabarets. Aside from this artistic "methodology", there were other reasons for drinking. The general public came to the cafés "to wash away their unfulfilled hopes and dreams with alcohol". Varriano notes that Lautrec may have been drawn to drinking and café culture in this way as well to help cope with his disability. John Storm writes that "Lautrec drank constantly to anesthetize the pain in his legs and in prodigious quantities." Valadon may have been attracted to drinking when she had to give up her dream as a trapeze artist for the Cirque Molier after she fell and injured her back at the age of 15. In The Hangover, writes Varriano, Valadon "stares vacantly into space ... Her lack of affect is hardly unique for its time, and likenesses like this are common in the café scenes of Manet, Degas and others. This is the face of urban modernity, detached from a world which on the surface appeared so vibrant and fresh."

== Reception ==
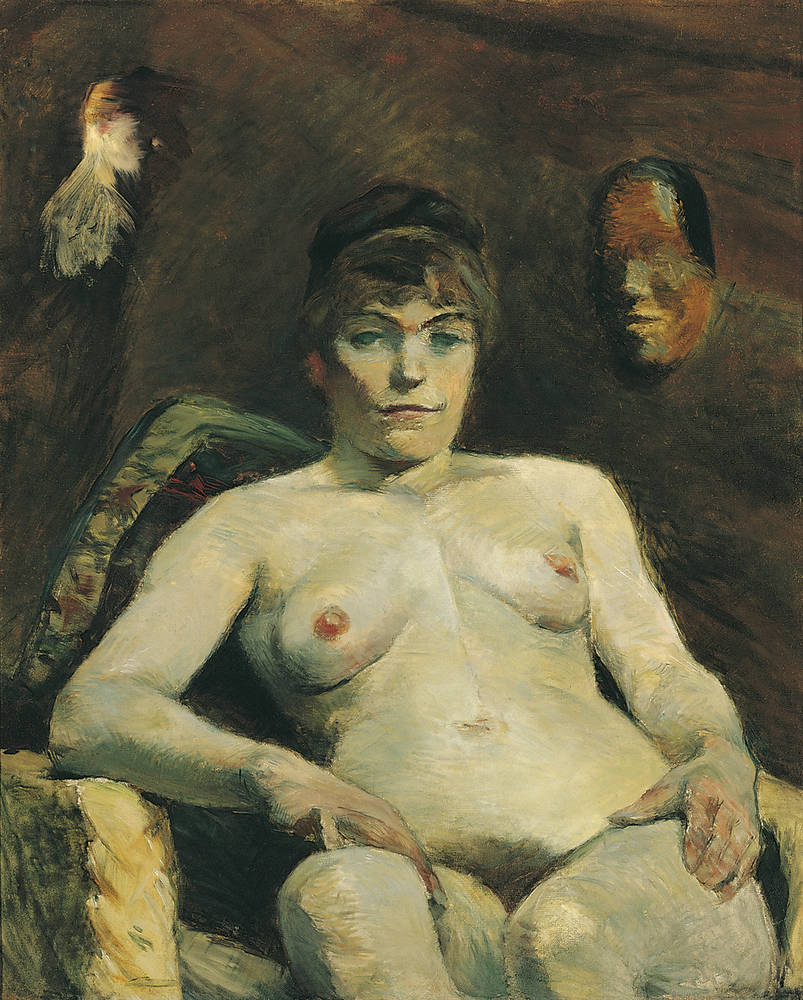
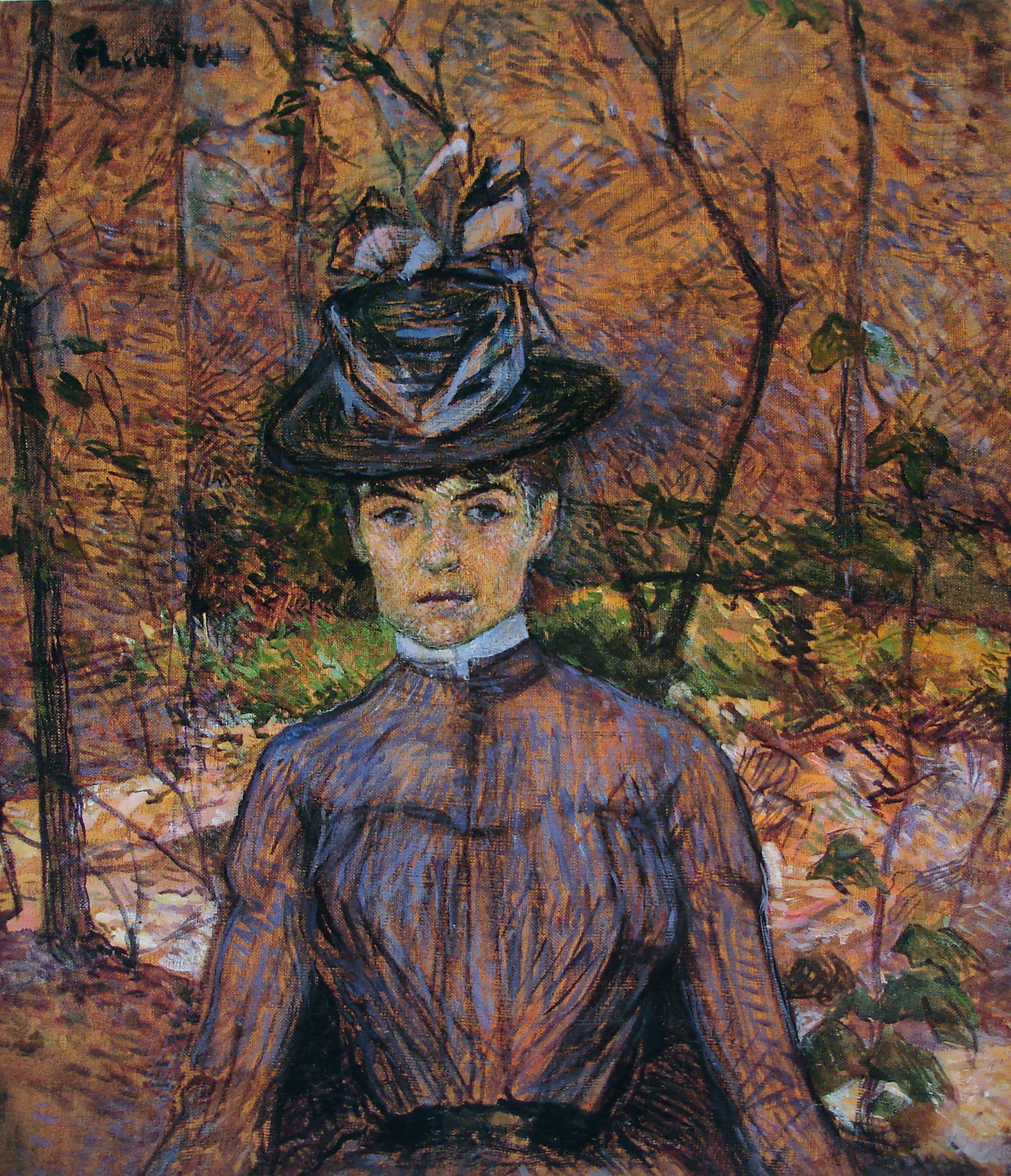
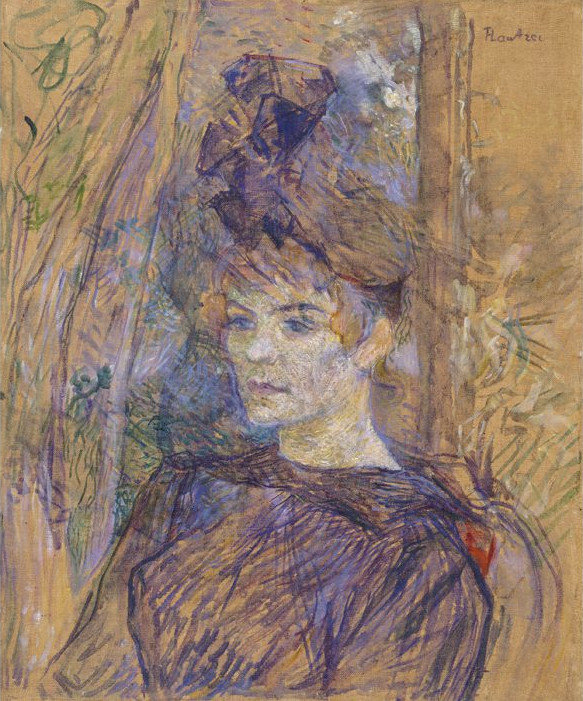
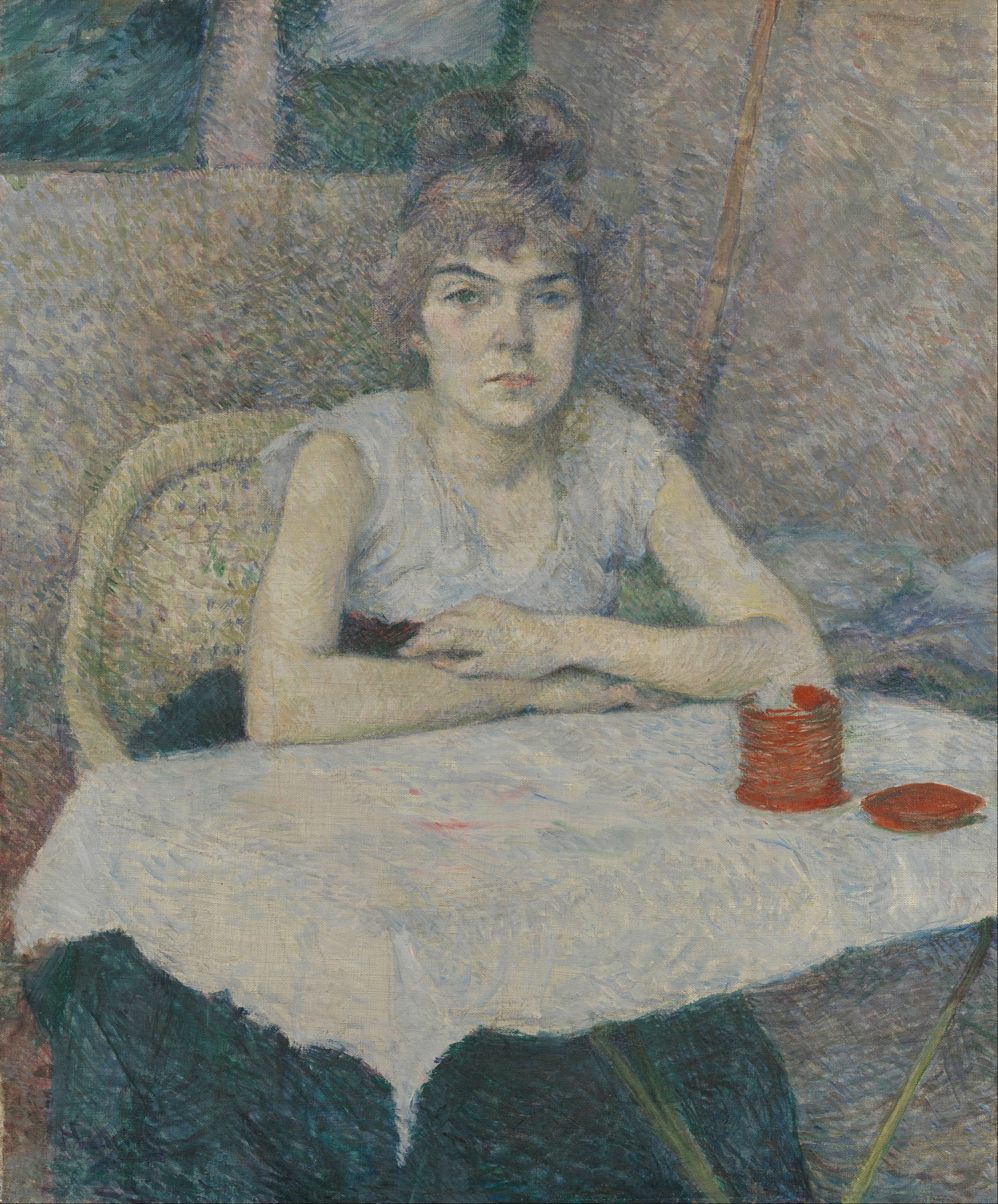
Top: Maria Big with Child (1884); Top-Middle: Madame Suzanne Valadon, artiste peintre (1885); Bottom-Middle: Portrait of Suzanne Valadon (1885); Bottom: Rice Powder (1887)

Toulouse-Lautrec was often criticized for the way he presented his art models. Biographer June Rose accused Lautrec of portraying Valadon as a "slattern" in his work, which contributed to the "tone of disparagement of Valadon the slut" for a century, often obscuring her later achievements as a woman artist. As late as 1996, writes Rose, experts were still unfairly referring to Valadon as a prostitute, in spite of her many achievements in the world of art since her time as a model. Working-class women like Valadon were viewed as sexually available and promiscuous. Along these same lines, Kathryn Schneider of the New Orleans Museum of Art notes how Lautrec's depiction of Suzanne Valadon changed in The Hangover compared to previous paintings after their relationship soured. "Lautrec's weakening friendship presents itself in Lautrec's painting of her", writes Schneider, "where he depicted her chastened and displeased, seated alone bent over a glass of wine. This portrayal differs greatly from Lautrec's 1885 portrait of Valadon entitled Madame Suzanne Valadon, artiste-peintre, where the artist represented Valadon as a confident and chic woman."

Other artists who supported Lautrec were aligned with his aesthetics and sensibilities. The Hangover would serendipitously bring French Impressionist Edgar Degas (1834–1917) into Lautrec's orbit when it caught his attention and vocal admiration. The illustrated magazine Le Courrier français published a drawing of The Hangover in 1889. (Note: Various sources report the date as 1890, but this appears incorrect. The drawing appeared in issue number 16 of Le Courrier français on April 21, 1889. See Mack 1938, p. 293; Dortu, M. G. (1971). Toulouse-Lautrec et Son Oeuvre: Les Artistes et Leurs Oeuvres, Êtudes et Documents. Vol. V. New-York: Collectors Editions. p. 506. ISBN 0876810458. OCLC 1342427219.) Subsequently, Lautrec gifted the drawing to the Dihau family of musicians. The family collected paintings and maintained their own gallery at home and were friends with Degas, although Lautrec had never made his acquaintance up to this point. One day, Degas was visiting the Dihau home and noticed the drawing of The Hangover, featuring Valadon as the model, hanging on the wall. "To think," Degas remarked, "a young man has done this, when we have worked so hard all our lives!" Later, Lautrec recommended Valadon to Degas as a potential mentee. Contrary to rumors, she never posed for Degas. They became friends, and Degas is said to have helped her exhibit her work in 1894 at the Société Nationale des Beaux-Arts, the first woman painter to do so.

== Provenance ==
The painting is thought to have been originally held by Aristide Bruant, but the provenance is unclear. It was later acquired by Maurice Masson in Paris and sold in 1911 to New York art dealer Stephan Bourgeois, thought to be representing Illinois native and Canadian railway tycoon William Cornelius Van Horne. In 1914, a duplicate, counterfeit art forgery was discovered at a retrospective exhibition. The authentic work was held by Van Horne's descendants until 1946, when it was sold to art collector Maurice Wertheim for $30,000 at an auction of the family collection. At the time, Art News reported that Wertheim's purchase of the painting was the "outstanding item" of the entire Van Horne collection, as it was the most expensive painting sold at the auction. Wertheim was said to prefer The Hangover to Lautrec's Redhead in Mr. Forest's Garden (1887), Lautrec's portrait of Carmen Gaudin (now in the collection of the Norton Simon Museum). Upon his death, Wertheim bequested the work to the Fogg Museum in 1951. The painting underwent a full technical examination in 1985, including pigment analysis and an X-radiograph. The study and drawing are held by the Musée Toulouse-Lautrec.

== Exhibitions ==
Between 1886 and 1892, Aristide Bruant maintained a permanent exhibition of selected works by Toulouse-Lautrec in his nightclub, Le Mirliton. By 1892, there were at least ten known works by Lautrec in the collection:

Le Mirliton exhibition

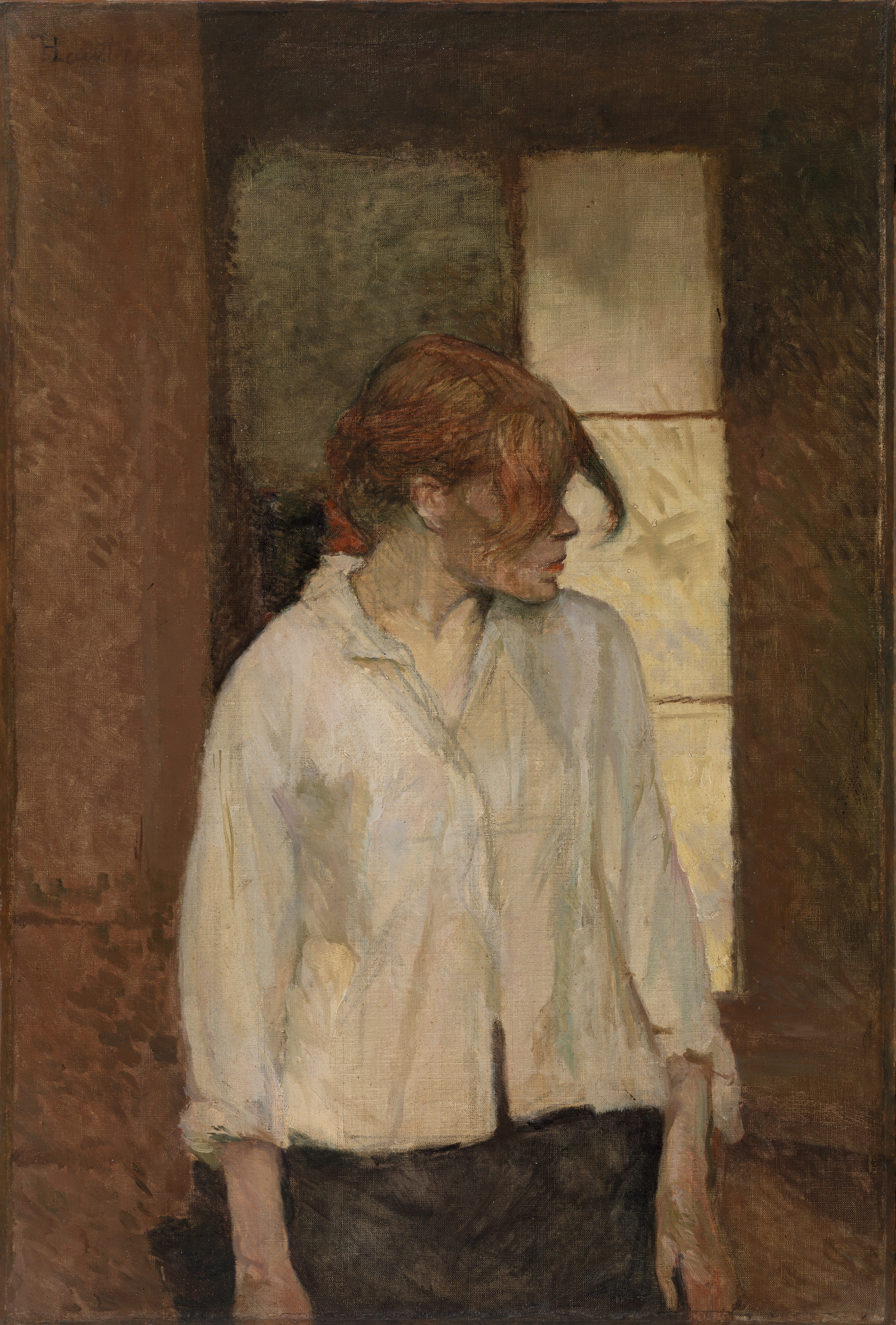
"A Montrouge"–Rosa La Rouge (1886–87)

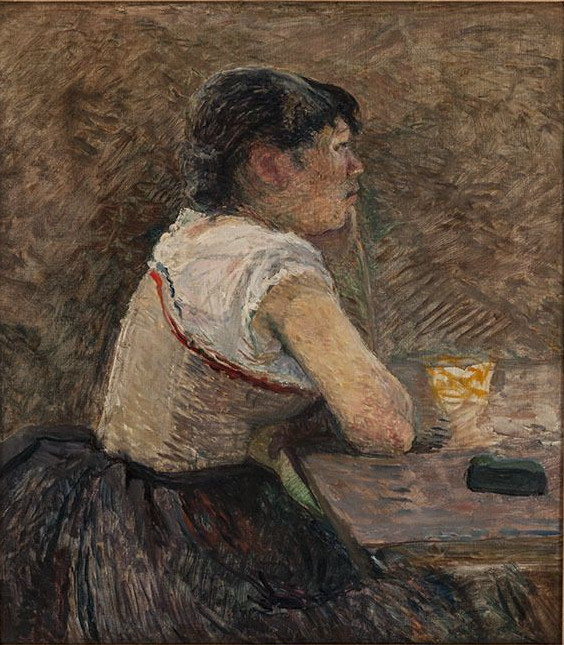
At Grenelle, Absinthe Drinker (1886)

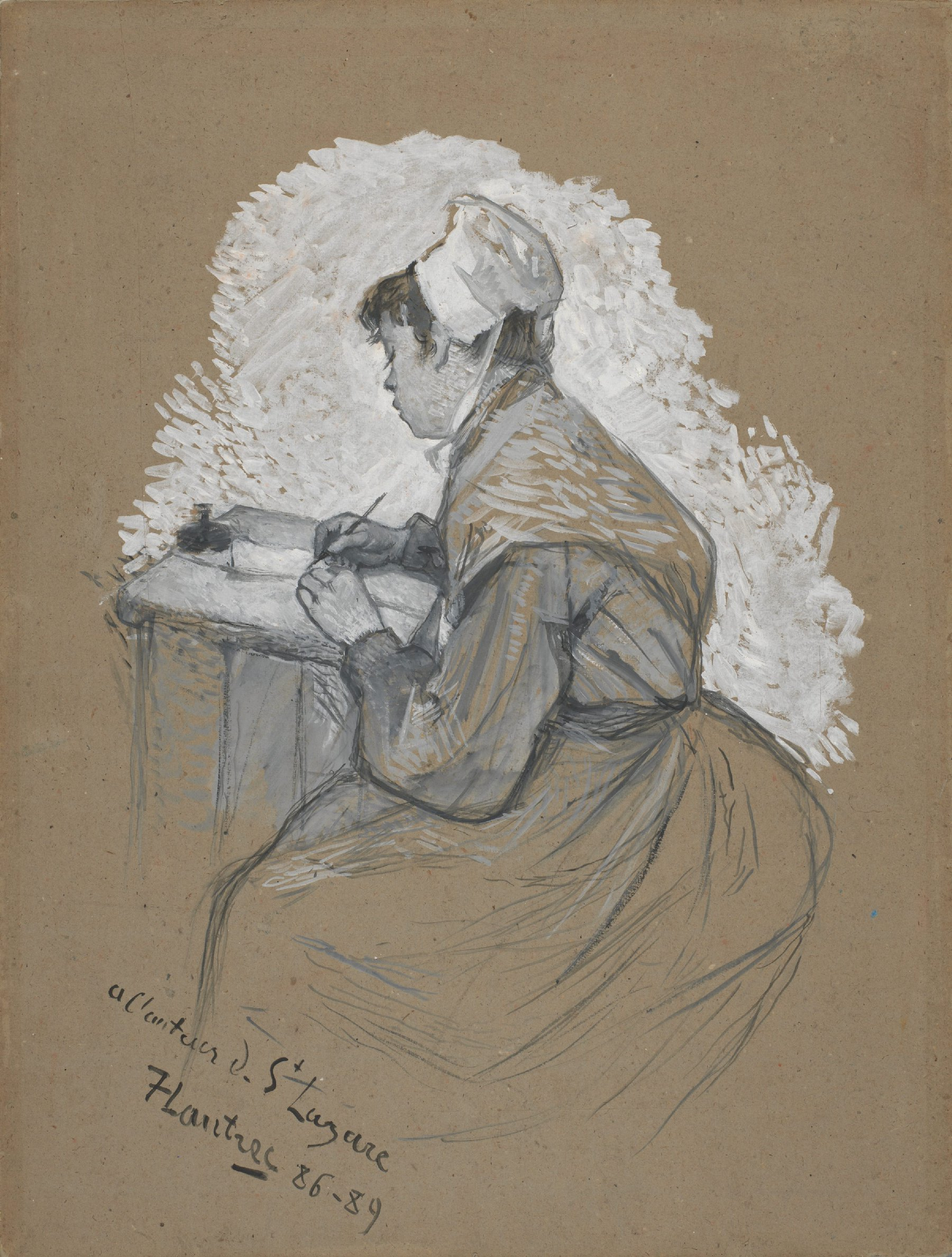
At Saint-Lazare (1886)

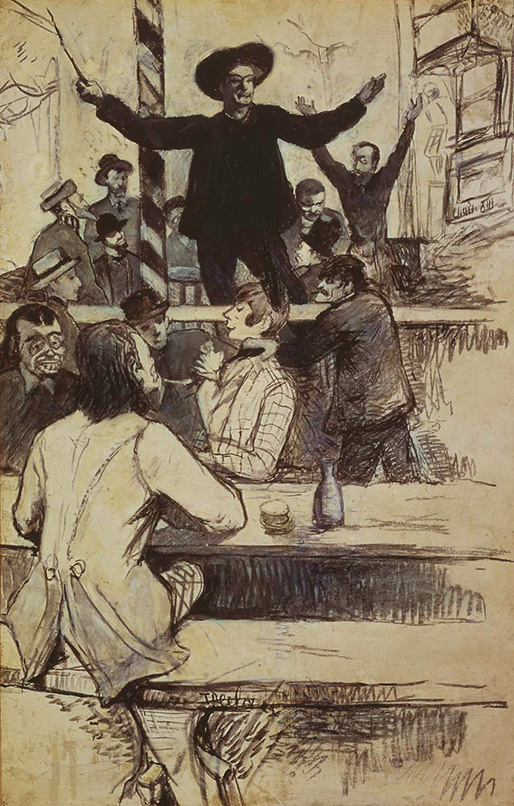
Le Refrain de la chaise Louis XIII au cabaret d'Aristide Bruant (1886)

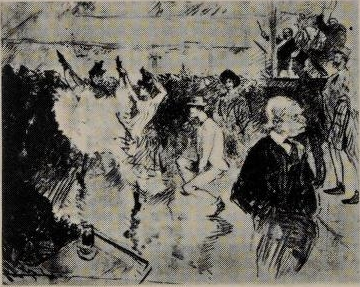
Le Quadrille de la chaise Louis XIII, a l'Elysee Montmartre (1886)

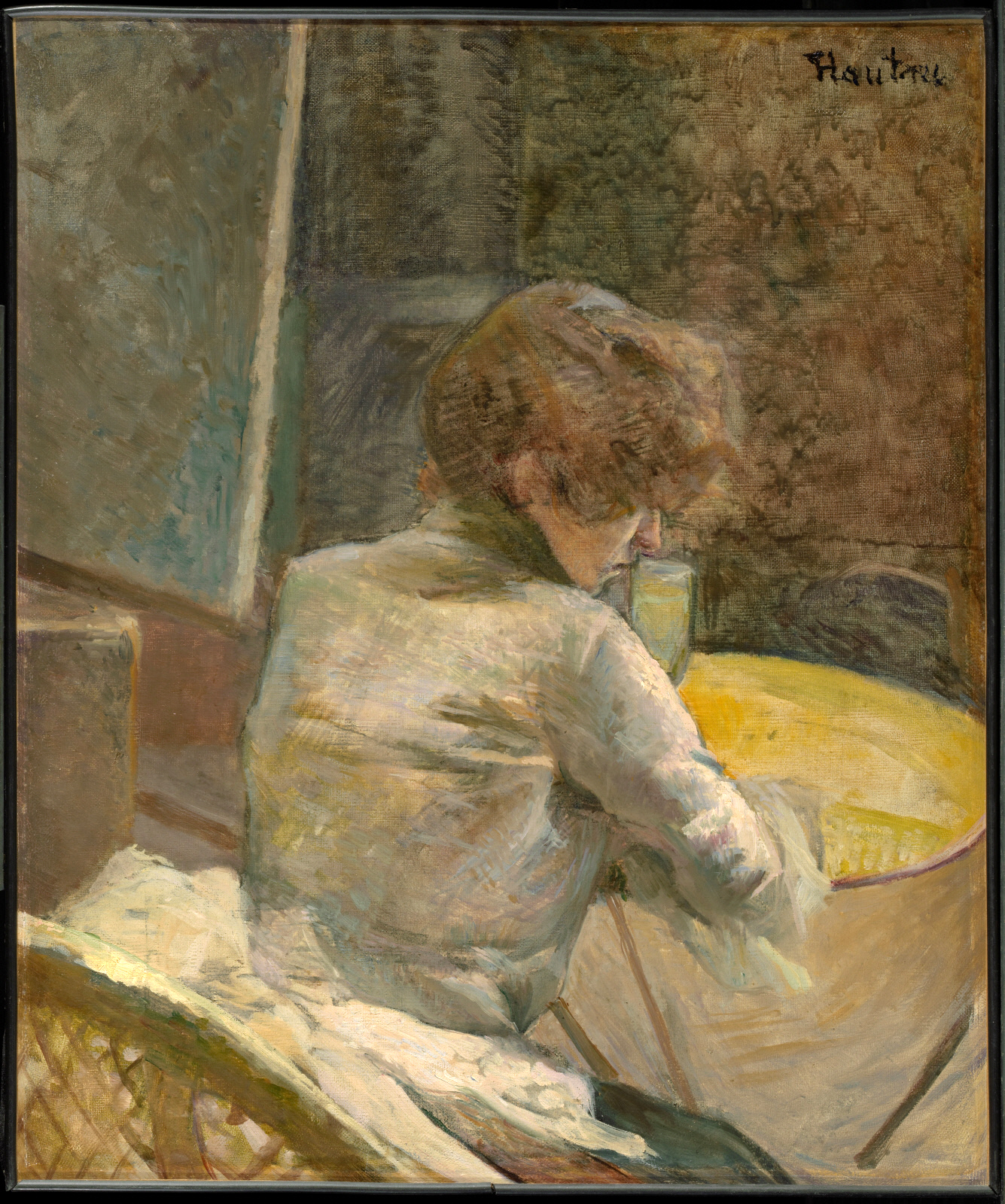
Waiting (c. 1887)

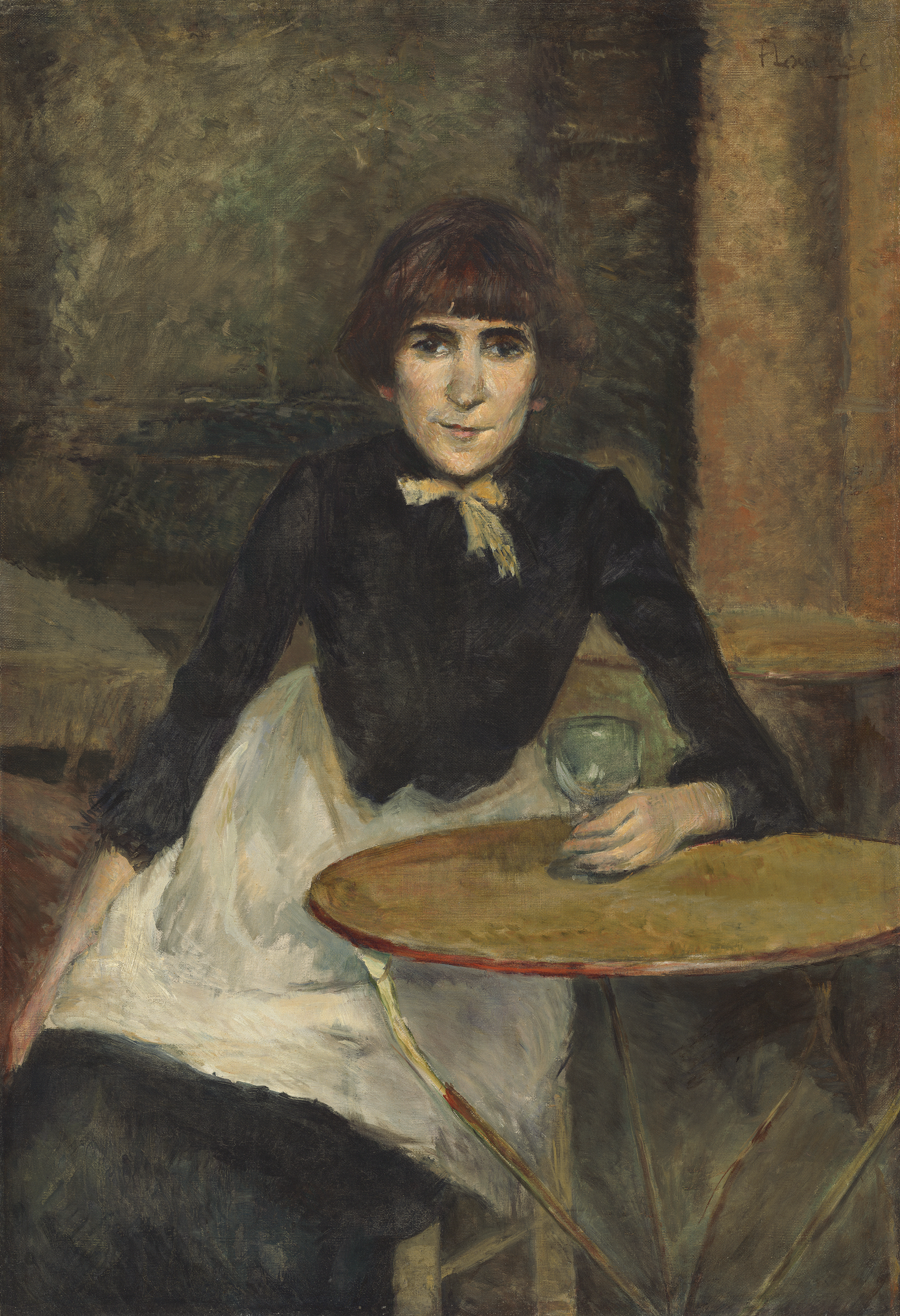
A la Bastille (Jeanne Wenz) (1888)

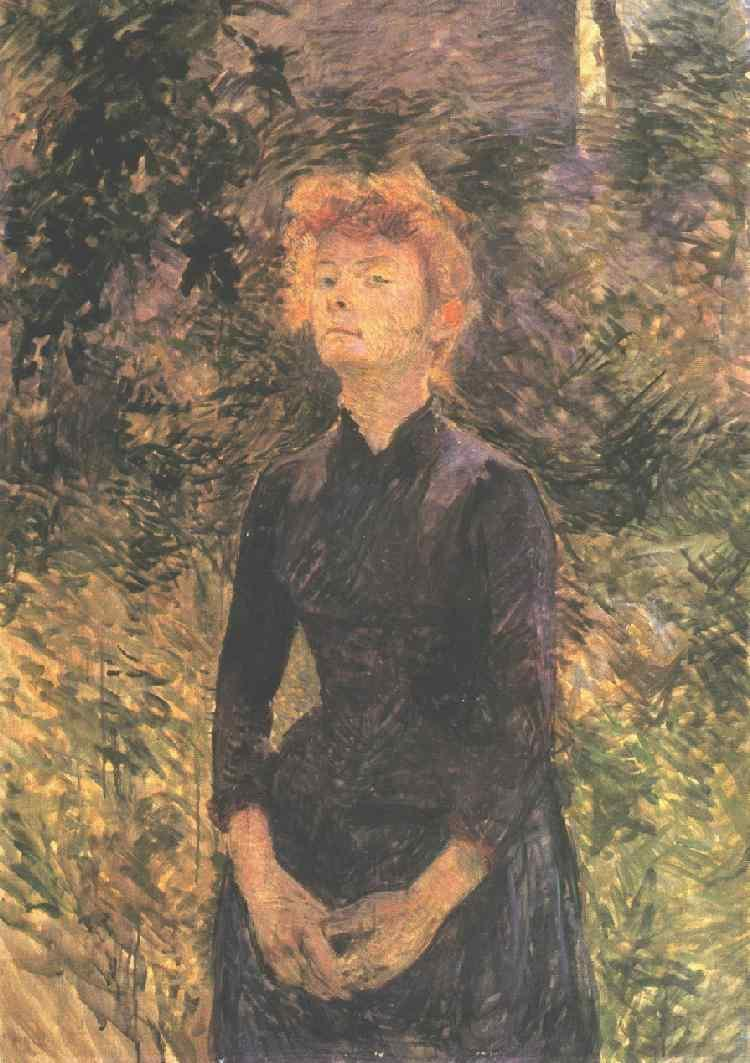
In Batignolles (1888)

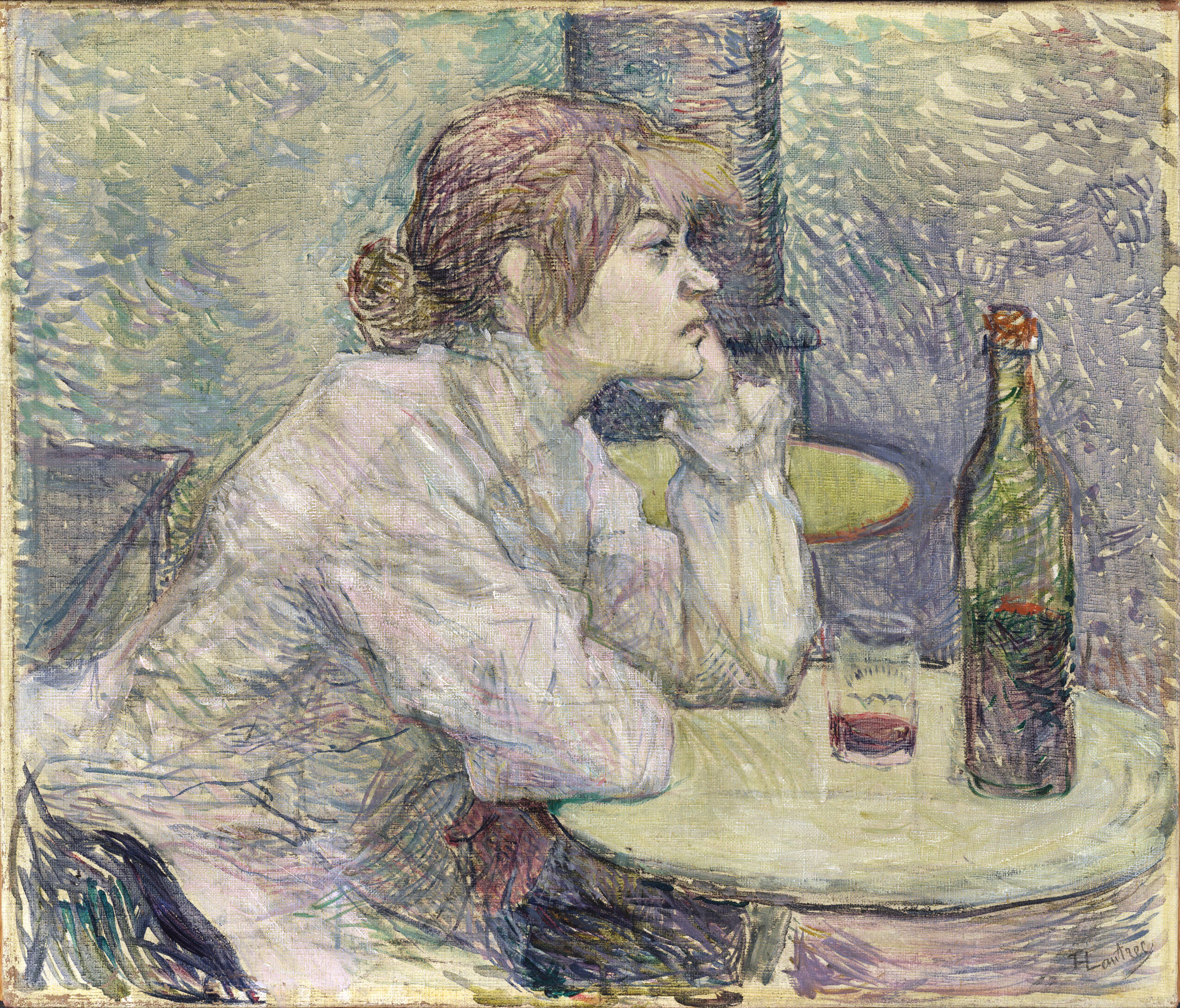
The Hangover (1887–1889)

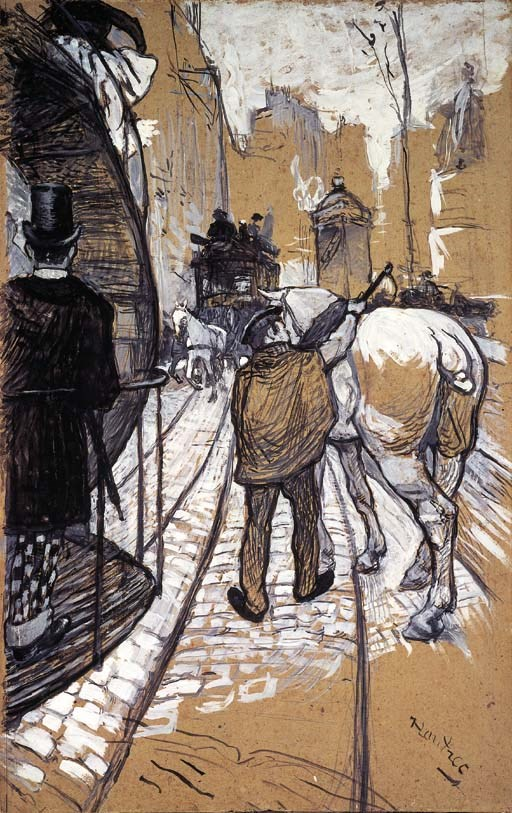
(1887–1889)

At least three notable exhibitions of The Hangover took place in the 20th century, and one in the 21st. These include its appearance at the International Exhibition of Modern Art, 69th Regiment Armory, New York City, from February 17 to March 15, 1913; its exhibition at the Art Association of Montreal, Montreal, Quebec, in 1933; its appearance at the Art Gallery of Ontario, Toronto, Ontario, in 1944; and its showing in the Three Women: Early Portraits by Henri Toulouse-Lautrec exhibition at the Fogg Art Museum, Cambridge, Massachusetts, from April 6 to July 21, 2002.

== Notes and references ==
Notes
