= At Grenelle, Absinthe Drinker =

Painting by Henri de Toulouse-Lautrec

À Grenelle, buveuse d'absinthe
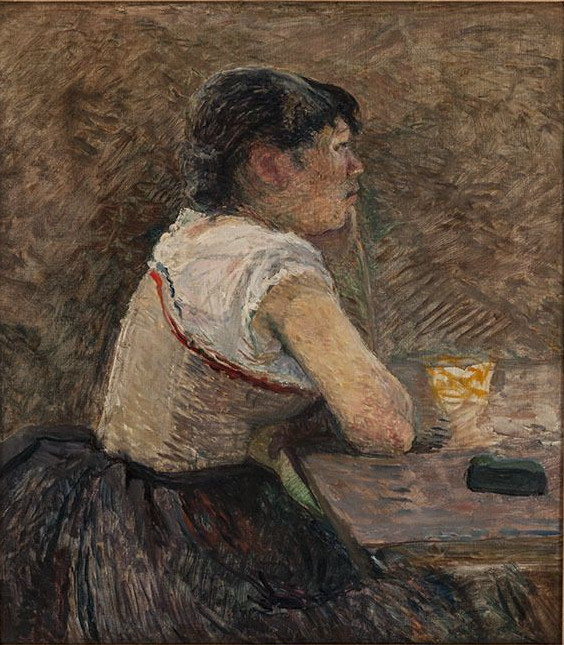
- Artist: Henri de Toulouse-Lautrec
- Year: 1886
- Catalogue: AP3268
- Medium: Oil on canvas
- Dimensions: 55.6 cm × 49.2 cm (21.9 in × 19.4 in)
- Location: Museo Botero; Bogotá

At Grenelle, Absinthe Drinker or Absinthe Drinker in Grenelle (French: À Grenelle, buveuse d'absinthe) is an oil-on-canvas painting by the French Post-Impressionist painter Henri de Toulouse-Lautrec. Painted in 1886, it is held in the collection of Colombia's Bank of the Republic and exhibited at the Museo Botero, in Bogotá.

== Description ==
The work depicts an anonymous woman drinking absinthe at Le Mirliton, a cabaret. Under low light, she is staring into the distance, most likely watching the theatrical entertainment of the venue.

Painted towards the opening of Bruant's cabaret, the Absinthe Drinker in Grenelle was one of the first paintings that Toulouse-Lautrec dedicated to the theme of solitary drinkers, a very common theme in this period of French painting, with examples by Edgar Degas, Édouard Manet, Pierre-Auguste Renoir, and Pablo Picasso in his blue period.

Toulouse-Lautrec, as a heavy drinker himself, found many of the subjects for his paintings in cabaret and brothel scenes.

== Provenance and ownership ==
The first recorded owner of the painting was Aristide Bruant, the owner of the cabaret where Toulouse-Lautrec painted many of his subjects. Bruant purchased the painting in 1905 and it remained in his collection until his death in 1925.

Fernando Botero, as an avid art collector, acquired the painting and, in 2000, donated it to the Bank of the Republic to form the Museo Botero along with 207 other paintings and sculptures.

Per Resolution 565, of 16 April 2012, of the Ministry of Culture of Colombia, the entirety of the Fernando Botero collection, including the Absinthe Drinker in Grenelle, was voted on by the National Council of Cultural Heritage as an asset of cultural interest for the nation.
