= The Louvre, Foggy Morning =

Painting by Camille Pissarro

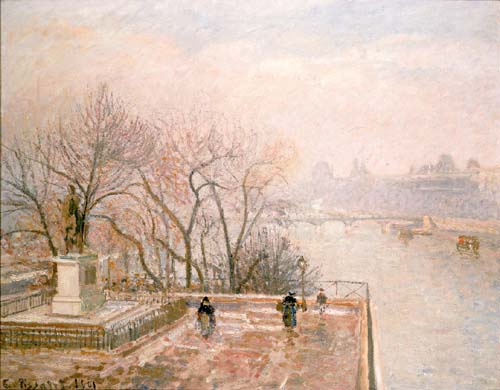
- Artist: Camille Pissarro
- Year: 1901
- Catalogue: JP 1402 and CD-RS 1170
- Medium: Oil on canvas
- Dimensions: 73 cm × 92 cm (29 in × 36 in)
- Location: Museo Botero, Bogotá

The Louvre, Foggy Morning (French: Le Louvre, matin brumeux) is an oil-on-canvas painting by the Danish-French Impressionist painter Camille Pissarro. Painted in February 1901, the work is in the collection of the Bank of the Republic, the central bank of Colombia, and currently displayed at the Museo Botero in Bogotá.

== Description ==
Pissarro, having suffered from an ocular illness that forced him to abandon outdoor activities, focused on painting urban scenes from the window of his home in Place Dauphine. In February 1901, from the window of his rented flat in 28 Place Dauphine, Pissarro painted several scenes of the Louvre. In this painting, Pissarro captures the light of a winter morning across the composition, clarifying the areas around the Seine and the roof sections of the Louvre Palace. In the foreground, towards the bottom-left, Pissarro depicts the Square du Vert-Galant with the equestrian statue of Henry IV in the centre.

The painting is signed and dated by Pissarro at the bottom left of the picture.

== Historical information ==
One of Pissarro's favorite subjects towards the end of his life was the spectacle of the streets of Paris. From 1897 until his death, the artist painted several series of landscapes of Paris seen at different times of the day. Recurring scenes included Avenue de l'Opéra, Quai Malaquais, Tuileries Garden, Place du Carrousel, the Louvre Palace, the Equestrian statue of Henry IV, and the Square du Vert-Galant.

== Ownership and provenance ==
Fernando Botero, an avid art collector, acquired the painting from Galerie Manzi-Joyant in Paris. In 2000, Botero donated the painting to the Bank of the Republic to form the Museo Botero along with 207 other paintings and sculptures.

Per Resolution 565, of 16 April 2012, of the Ministry of Culture of Colombia, the entirety of the Fernando Botero collection, including The Louvre, Foggy Morning, was voted on by the National Council of Cultural Heritage as an asset of cultural interest for the nation.

The painting had previously been part of Christina Onassis' private art collection and, at one point, exhibited at Hammer Galleries in New York City.

== See also ==
- List of paintings by Camille Pissarro

== Bibliography ==
- Caballero, Antonio. (2002). Colección Botero:en primera persona del singular. Bogotá: Banco de la República de Colombia. ISBN 958-664-102-3
- Bonet, Juan Manuel. (2021). Museo Botero. Bogotá: Banco de la República de Colombia. ISBN 978-958-664-419-8
