= Mother and Child (Beckmann) =

Painting by Max Beckmann

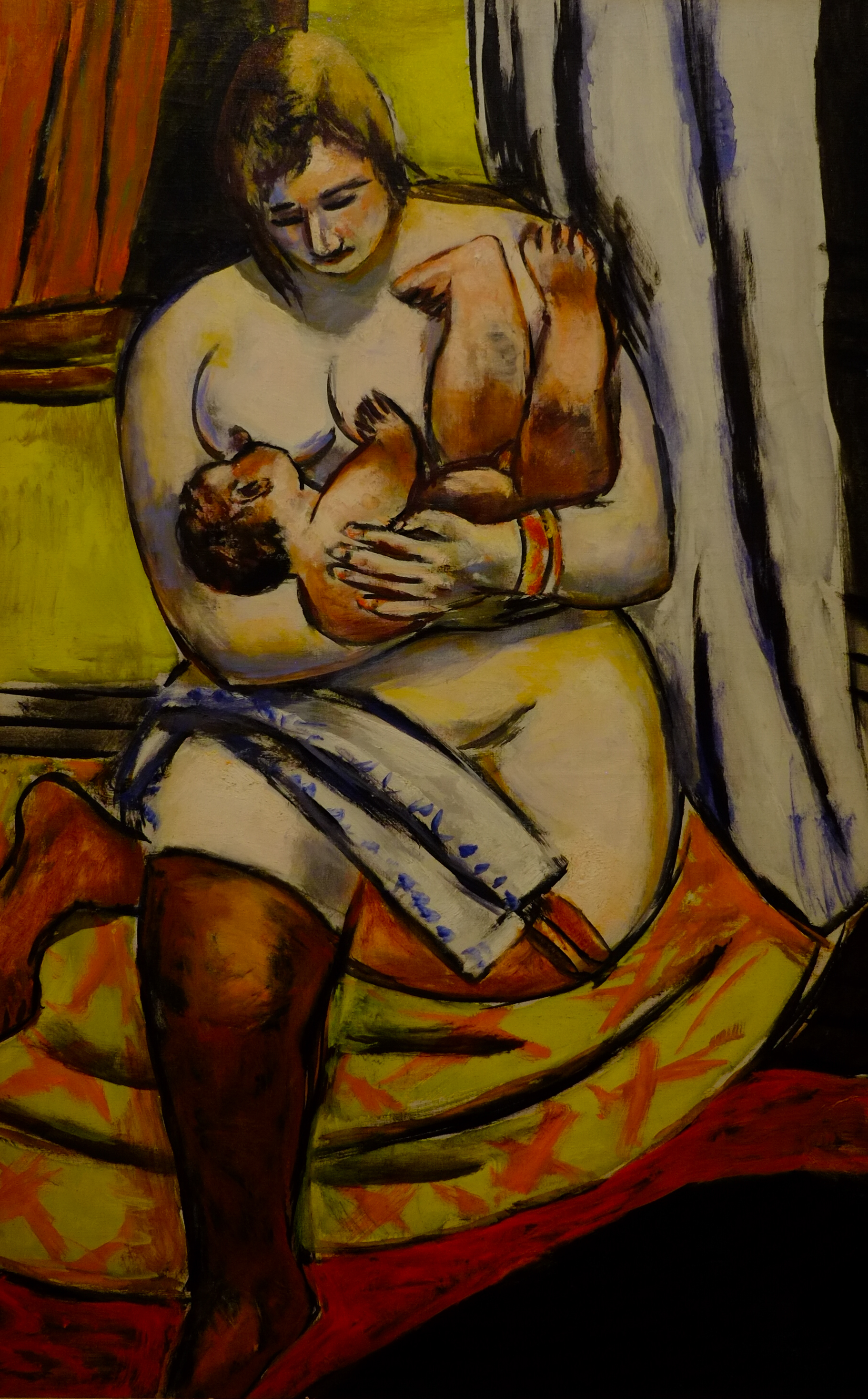
- Artist: Max Beckmann
- Year: 1936
- Medium: Oil on canvas
- Dimensions: 138.5 cm × 89 cm (54.5 in × 35 in)
- Location: Museo Botero; Bogotá

Mother and Child is an oil-on-canvas painting executed in 1936 by the German artist Max Beckmann. It is held in the collection of the Bank of the Republic and exhibited at the Museo Botero, in Bogotá.

== Description ==
The painting depicts a nearly naked voluptuous woman comfortably breastfeeding a male child in her arms. With a sober look, the woman faces the child. Despite the use of vivid colors, the picture looks rather dark.

The style of this work is a reflection of the radical transformation that Beckmann experienced since 1914, disturbed by the horrors of war, which led him to radical expressionism. The black strokes, inspired by Georges Rouault, for whom Beckmann had great admiration, are perceived as violent, very pasted, and executed at great speed.

Fernando Botero, who has described this painting to be among his favorite pieces in his collection, has quoted:

Max Beckmann is a great painter and I feel fortunate to have Woman and Child in my collection. It is a painting of great violence, of great quality, and very unexpected.

== Provenance ==
The painting was acquired by Fernando Botero directly from Beckmann's wife, Mathilde “Quappi“ von Kaulbach. Quappi was renowned for assisting Beckmann by keeping track of his catalogue raisonné. The painting was accessioned in 2000 by the Bank of the Republic and, since then, has been exhibited at the Museo Botero in Bogotá.

Per Resolution 565, of 16 April 2012, of the Ministry of Culture of Colombia, the entirety of the Fernando Botero collection, including Mother and Child, was voted on by the National Council of Cultural Heritage as an asset of cultural interest for the nation.

== Bibliography ==
- Caballero, Antonio. (2002). Colección Botero:en primera persona del singular. Bogotá: Banco de la República de Colombia. ISBN 958-664-102-3
- Bonet, Juan Manuel. (2021). Museo Botero. Bogotá: Banco de la República de Colombia. ISBN 978-958-664-419-8
