= Nude on the Chair =

Painting by Pierre Bonnard

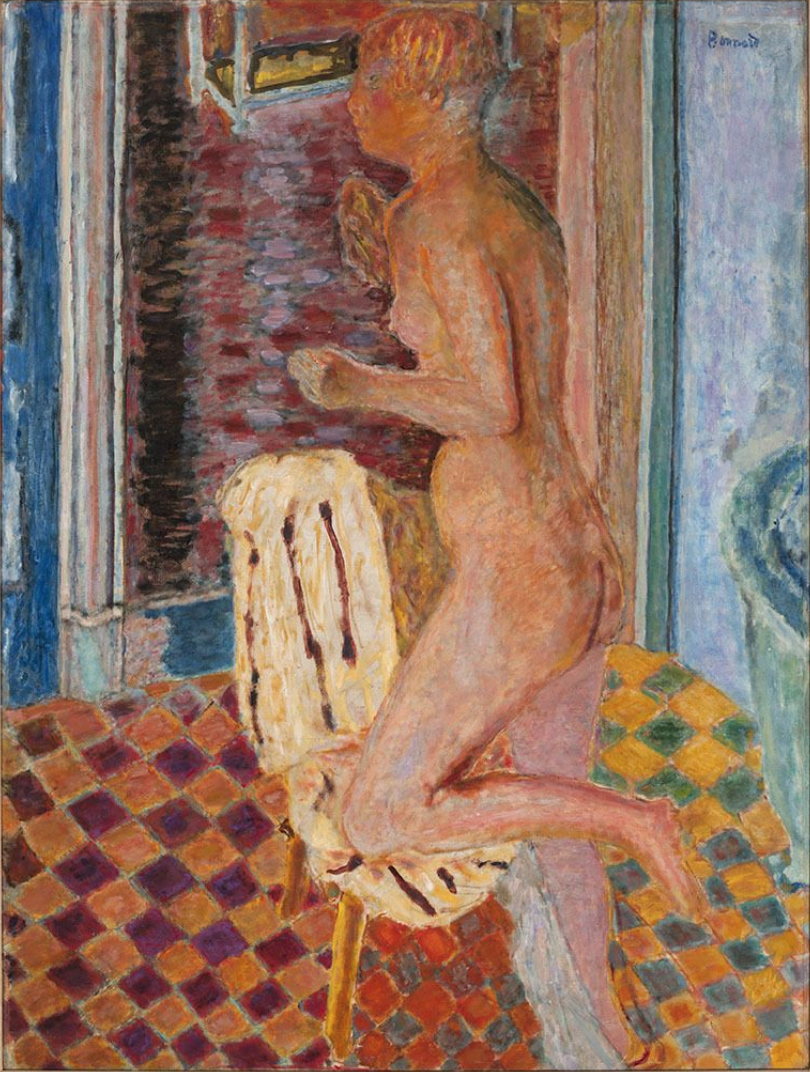
- Artist: Pierre Bonnard
- Year: 1935–1938
- Medium: Oil on canvas
- Dimensions: 127 cm × 97 cm (50 in × 38 in)
- Location: Museo Botero, Bogotá

Nude on the Chair or Nude with Chair (French: Nu à la chaise) is an oil-on-canvas painting by the French Post-Impressionist painter Pierre Bonnard. Created between 1935 and 1938, it is now held in the collection of the Bank of the Republic and exhibited at the Museo Botero, in Bogotá.

== Description ==
The work depicts the artist's partner and frequent model Marthe de Mėrigny after a bath in a tub, most probably at the artist's home in Arcachon. Marthe appears nude and standing on a white chair in the middle of the bathroom which appears as warm, shadowless, and light in color.

Fernando Botero, in hommage to Bonnard, interpreted Nude with Chair as an oil-on-canvas painting titled El baño (1999) which is also exhibited at the Museo Botero in Bogotá.

== Ownership and provenance ==
Nude with Chair remained part of Bonnard's estate, and later his inheritance, until his passing in 1947. The painting was acquired by Fernando Botero from an anonymous art collector in Europe months before donating it to the Bank of the Republic to form the Museo Botero along with 207 other paintings and sculptures.

Per Resolution 565, of 16 April 2012, of the Ministry of Culture of Colombia, the entirety of the Fernando Botero collection, including Nude on the Chair, was voted on by the National Council of Cultural Heritage as an asset of cultural interest for the nation.

== Bibliography ==
- Caballero, Antonio. (2002). Colección Botero:en primera persona del singular. Bogotá: Banco de la República de Colombia. ISBN 958-664-102-3
- Bonet, Juan Manuel. (2021). Museo Botero. Bogotá: Banco de la República de Colombia. ISBN 978-958-664-419-8
