= Dihau =

Dihau is a surname. Notable people with this surname include:

- Désiré Dihau (1833–1909), French bassoonist and composer, brother of Marie and Henri
- Marie Dihau (1843–1935), French singer, pianist, and music teacher, sister of Désiré and Henri
- Henri Dihau, the subject of artist Henri de Toulouse-Lautrec, brother of Marie and Désiré
