= Museo Botero =

Art museum in Bogotá, Colombia

Botero Museum
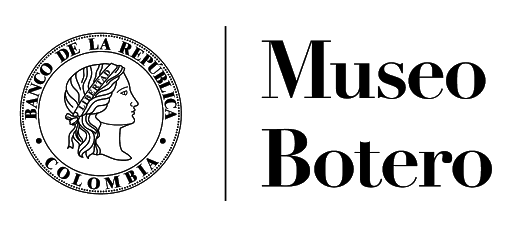

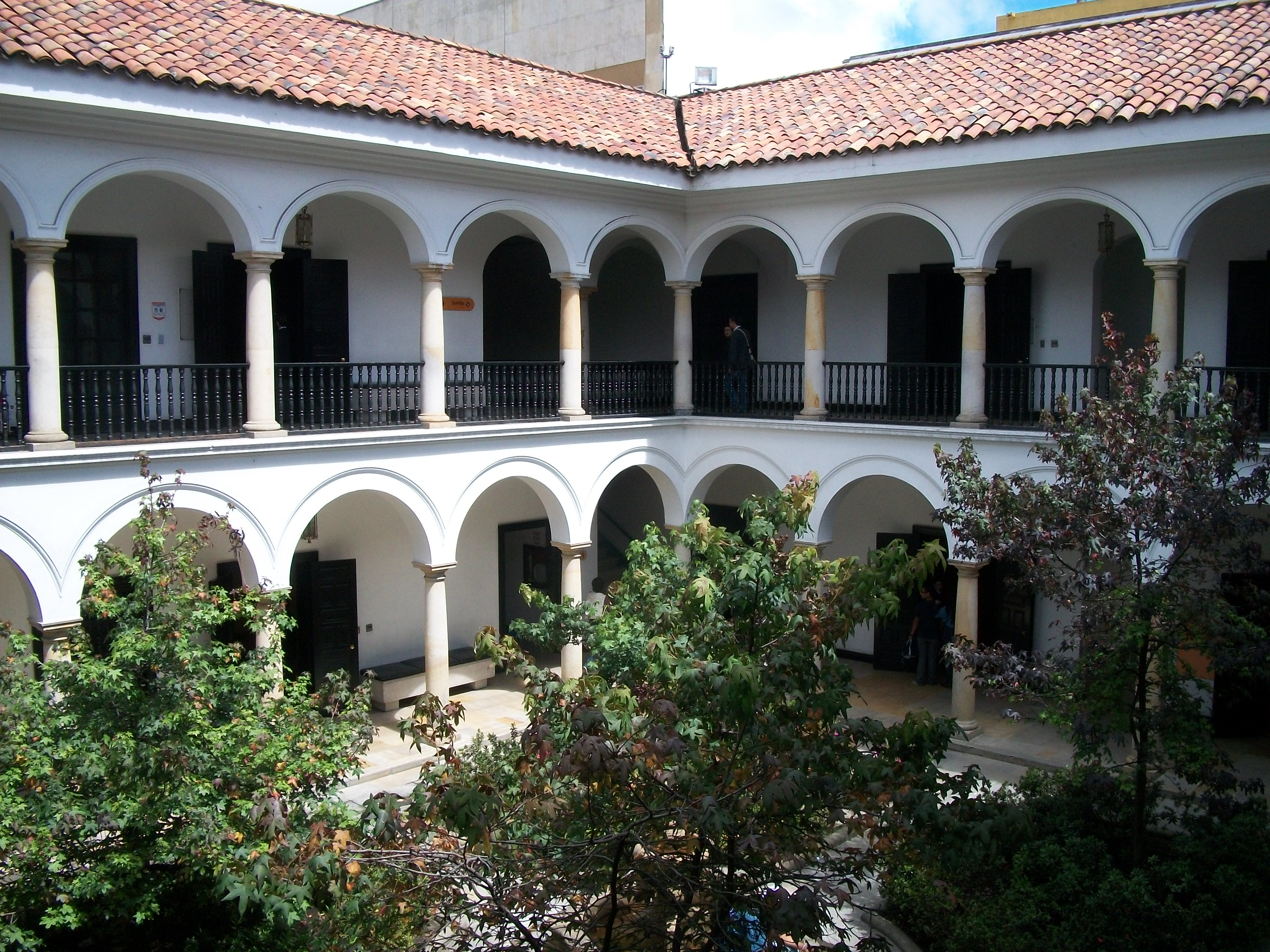
- Main patio of the museum
- Interactive fullscreen map
- Established: 2000
- Location: Calle 11 # 4-41; Bogotá
- Coordinates: 4.59665°N 74.07323°W
- Type: Art museum
- Public transit access: Museo del Oro station
- Website: www.banrepcultural.org/museo-botero

The Museo Botero, also known as the Botero Museum, is an art museum located in La Candelaria neighborhood of Bogotá, Colombia. It houses mostly works by Colombian artist Fernando Botero, however it also includes artworks from others international artists that were part of Botero's private art collection.

The museum sees over 500,000 visitors annually, including 2,000 students per month. The museum is managed by the cultural branch of the Bank of the Republic and is part of La Candelaria cultural complex along with the Gold Museum, the Luis Ángel Arango Library, the Miguel Urrutia Art Museum, and the Museo Casa de Moneda.

== History ==
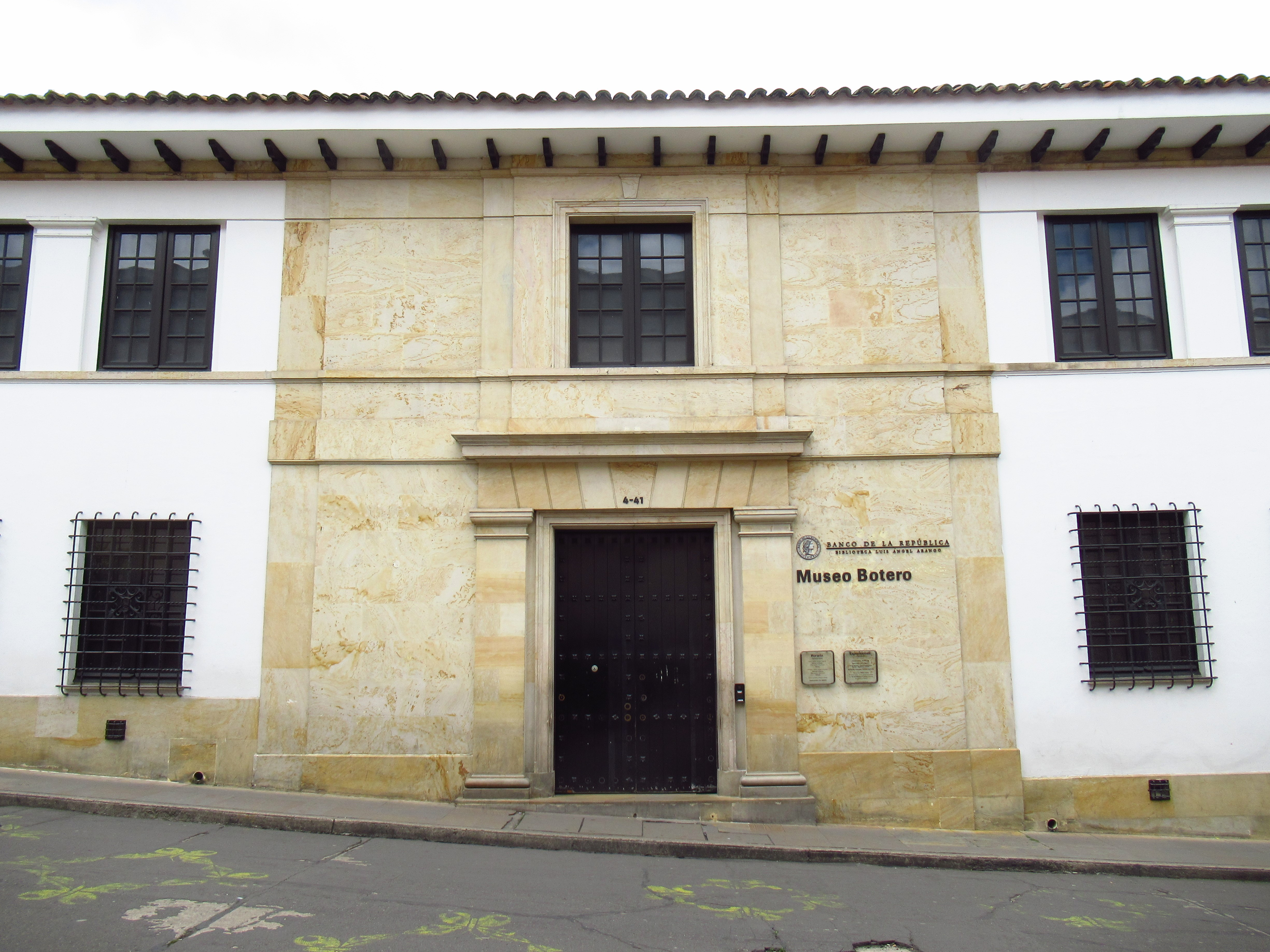
Main entrance to the museum

Since the late 1960s, Colombian artist Fernando Botero had been a noted art collector, initially of pre-Columbian pieces, later of colonial art and more recently of drawing, painting and universal modern sculpture. Until 1999, all of his collections were scattered throughout his properties in New York, Paris, Monte Carlo and Pietrasanta, as well as in a Swiss bank deposit in Bogotá.

From the mid-1990s, Botero had raised the possibility of donating his entire art collection to the Museum of Antioquia in Medellín. However, the slowness in making decisions by the Antioquia authorities led him to accept the proposal of the then mayor of Bogotá, Enrique Peñalosa, to donate his collection to the nation via its central bank.

In 2000, Botero donated 208 art pieces, 123 of his own making and 85 of other international artists, to the Bank of the Republic. The museum is administered by Banrepcultural. With this collection, the Botero Museum was founded in the neighborhood of La Candelaria, the historic center of Bogotá, in a colonial mansion that was acquired by the Bank of the Republic and made suitable to house the art collection by Fernando Botero himself. Since November 1, 2000, the museum has been open to the public free of charge.

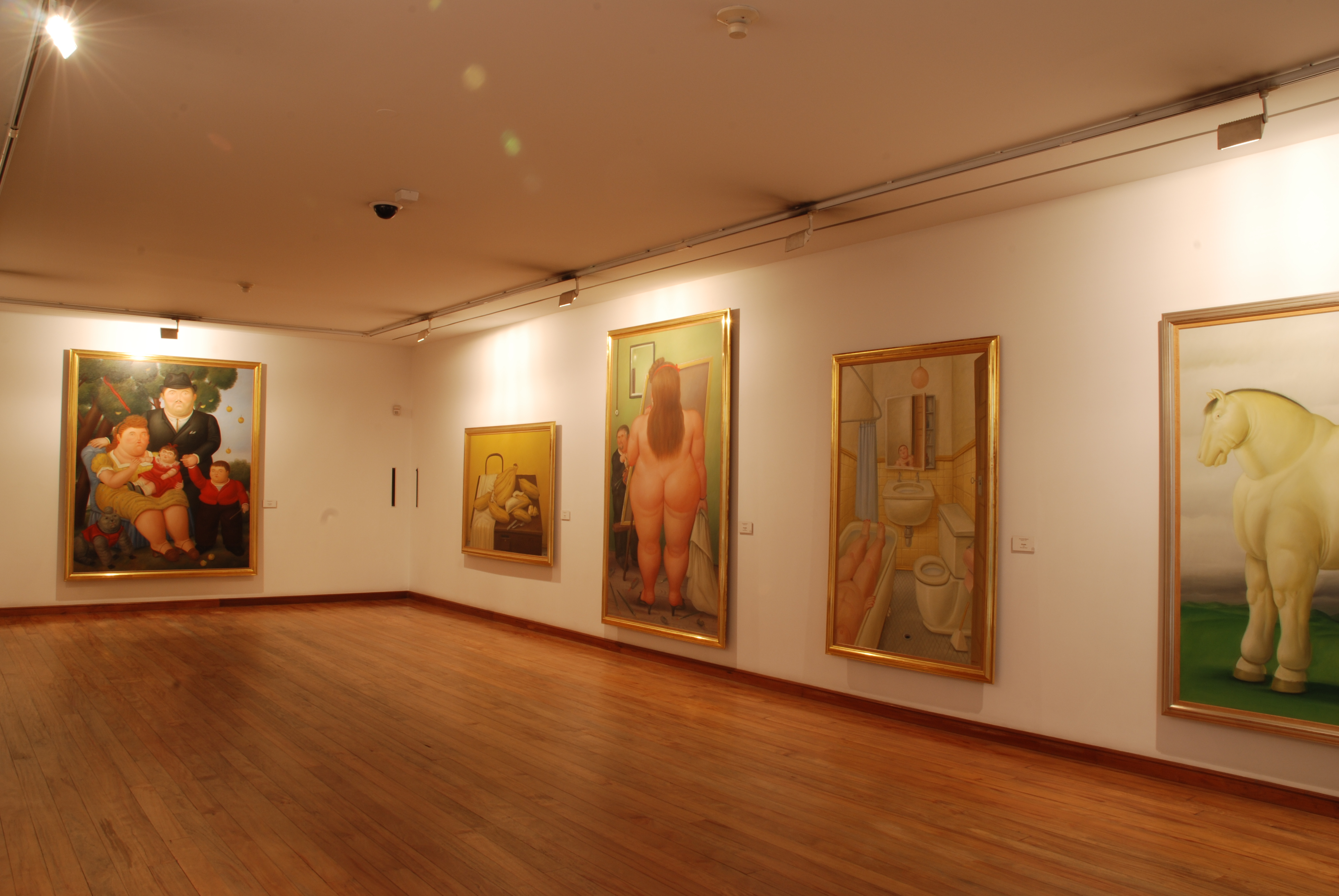
Rooms from the Museo Botero

In the same year, Botero's collection arrived in Colombia after an exhibition at the Fundación Santander Central Hispano in Madrid (Spain). After donating these works to Bogotá, at the request of the Antioquia authorities, the artist also decided to donate a significant set of pieces of his authorship to the Museum of Antioquia, in addition to a set of sculptures for the Botero Plaza (in front of said Museum), in Medellin. Although most of the collection of international artists had been donated by Botero to Bogotá, he decided to put together a new set of about 21 pieces (Matta, Lam, Stella, Rodin, among others), to donate to the Museum of Antioquia.

Per the Ministry of Culture Resolution 565, of 16 April 2012, the entirety of the collection donated by Fernando Botero was voted on by the National Council of Cultural Heritage of Colombia as an asset of cultural interest for the nation.

When Botero died in 2023, his coffin was laid in state in the courtyard of the museum.

== Collection ==
The museum consists of 123 works of Fernando Botero and 85 of other artists for a total of 208 works of art. Highlights of the permanent collection include works by Balthus, Georges Braque, Marc Chagall, Salvador Dalí, Joan Miró, Pablo Picasso, Sonia Delaunay, Claude Monet, and Henri Matisse.

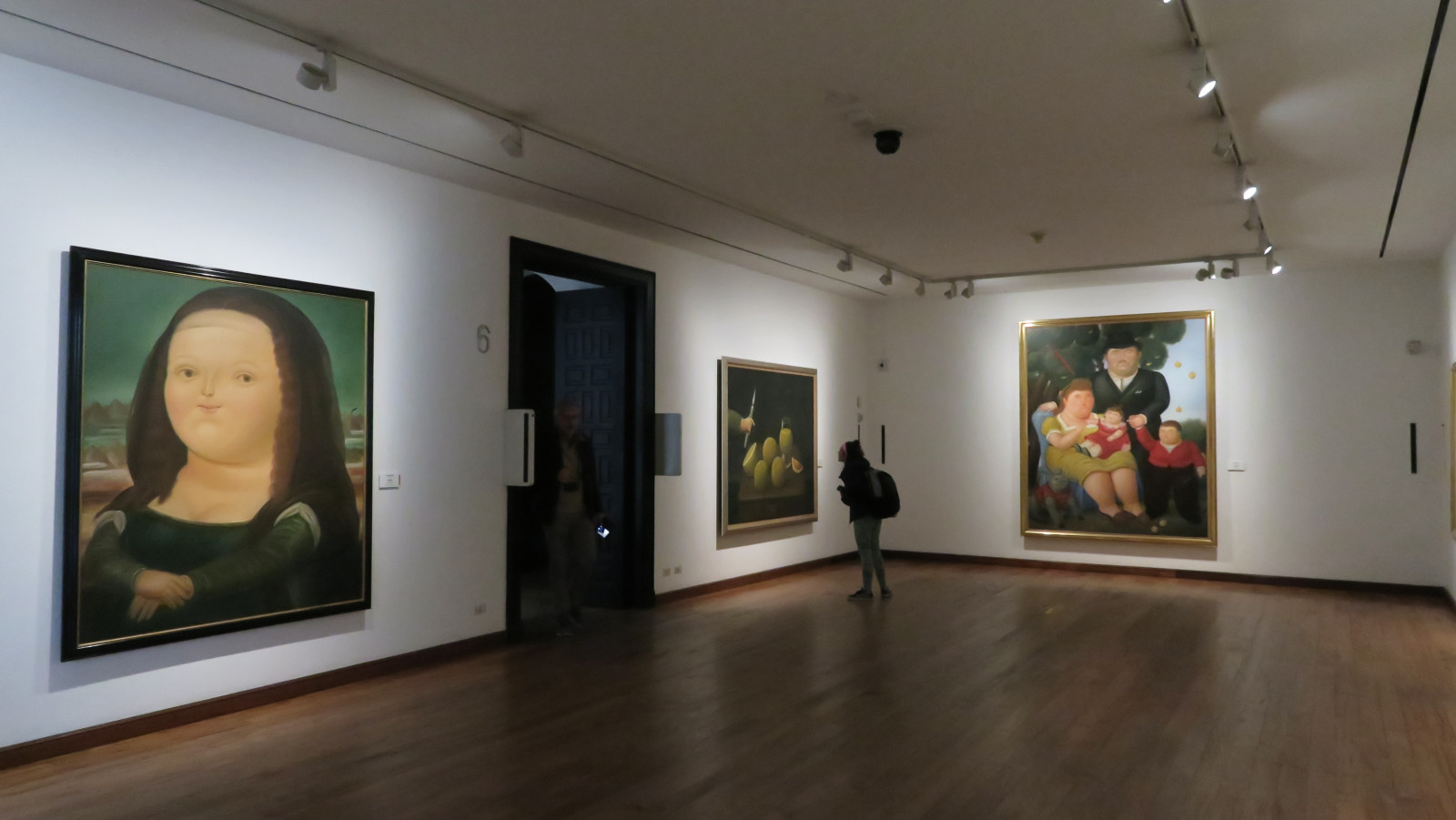
Some paintings by Botero in the museum.

=== The collection of works made by Fernando Botero ===
The collection of works by Fernando Botero includes numerous oil paintings, drawings, pastels, sanguines and sculptures made by him, especially during the most recent decades. His earliest production (in the 1940s, 1950s and 1960s) is not represented in this museum. Works from his initial artistic periods can be found in the permanent exhibition of the Colombian National Museum, also in Bogotá.

The collection includes a Boterian version of Leonardo da Vinci's Mona Lisa, identified by the Ministry of Culture of Colombia as one of the most important Botero paintings. The collection also includes a part of the first series on violence in Colombia (Pablo Escobar, Tirofijo, Carrobomba, La massacre de Mejor Esquina, etc.), among others. The latest series on violence in Colombia is part of the collection of the National Museum of Colombia.

=== Fernando Botero's Private Collection ===
In addition to the donation of his own work, Botero donated the entirety of his private art collection that included works by 85 different artists that include:

- Frank Auerbach – 1 painting
- Francis Bacon – 1 painting
- Balthus – 2 drawings
- Miquel Barceló – 1 painting
- Max Beckmann – 1 painting, 1 lithograph
- Pierre Bonnard – 1 painting
- Eugène Boudin – 1 painting
- Georges Braque – 2 paintings
- Gustave Caillebotte – 1 painting
- Alexander Calder – 1 mobile, 1 painting
- Anthony Caro – 1 sculpture
- Marc Chagall – 1 painting
- Jean-Baptiste-Camille Corot – 2 paintings
- Salvador Dalí – 1 sculpture
- Yves Dana – 1 sculpture
- Giorgio de Chirico – 1 painting
- Willem de Kooning – 1 painting
- Edgar Degas – 1 drawing, 1 sculpture
- Sonia Delaunay – 1 painting
- Paul Delvaux – 1 painting
- Jean Dubuffet – 1 painting
- Max Ernst – 2 sculptures, 1 painting
- Richard Estes – 1 painting
- Lucian Freud – 2 drawings
- Alberto Giacometti – 1 painting
- Julio González – 1 sculpture
- Emilio Greco – 1 sculpture
- George Grosz – 1 drawing
- Armand Guillaumin – 1 painting
- Asger Jorn – 1 painting
- Alex Katz – 1 painting
- R. B. Kitaj – 1 painting
- Gustav Klimt – 1 drawing
- Oskar Kokoshka – 1 drawing
- Wifredo Lam – 1 painting
- Henri Laurens – 2 sculptures
- Fernand Léger – 2 drawings, 1 painting
- Jacques Lipchitz – 1 painting
- Aristide Maillol – 1 sculpture
- Giacomo Manzù – 1 sculpture
- Marino Marini – 1 sculpture
- Albert Marquet – 1 painting
- Raymond Mason – 1 sculpture
- Henri Matisse – 1 drawing
- Roberto Matta – 1 painting
- Joan Miró – 1 painting
- Claude Monet – 1 painting
- Henry Moore – 1 sculpture
- Robert Motherwell – 1 painting
- Emil Nolde – 1 drawing
- Pablo Picasso – 2 paintings, 2 drawings, 1 lithograph
- Camille Pissarro – 1 painting
- Serge Poliakoff – 1 painting
- Robert Rauschenberg – 1 painting
- Pierre-Auguste Renoir – 2 paintings
- Georges Rouault – 1 painting
- Alfred Sisley – 1 painting
- Chaïm Soutine – 1 painting
- Rufino Tamayo – 1 painting
- Antoni Tàpies – 1 painting
- Joaquín Torres Garcia – 1 painting
- Henri de Toulouse-Lautrec – 1 painting
- Manolo Valdés – 1 painting
- Kees van Dongen – 1 painting
- Sophia Vari – 1 sculpture
- Édouard Vuillard – 1 painting
- Neil Welliver – 1 painting

== Gallery ==
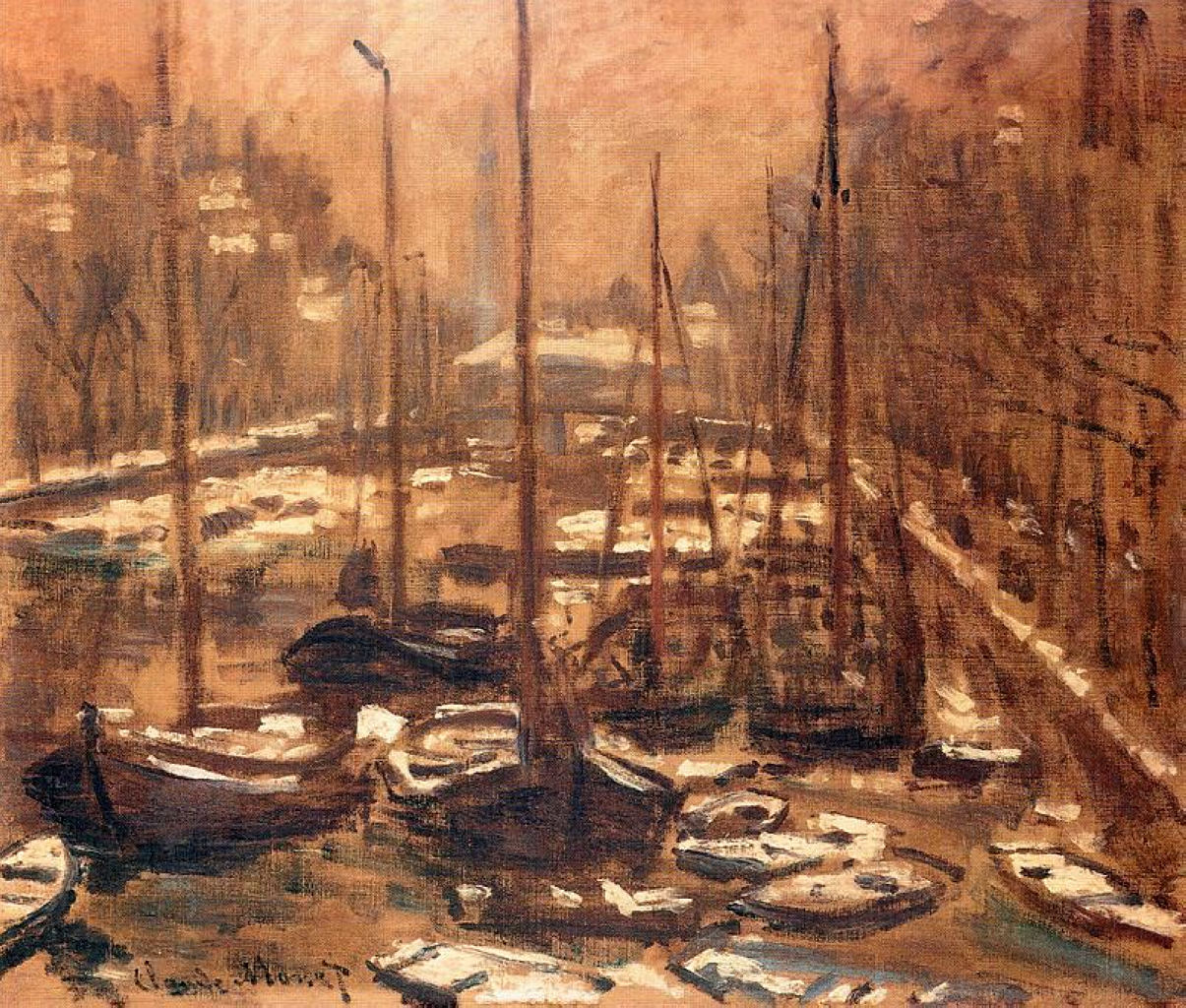
Claude Monet. The Geldersekade in Amsterdam, in winter, 1871–1874.

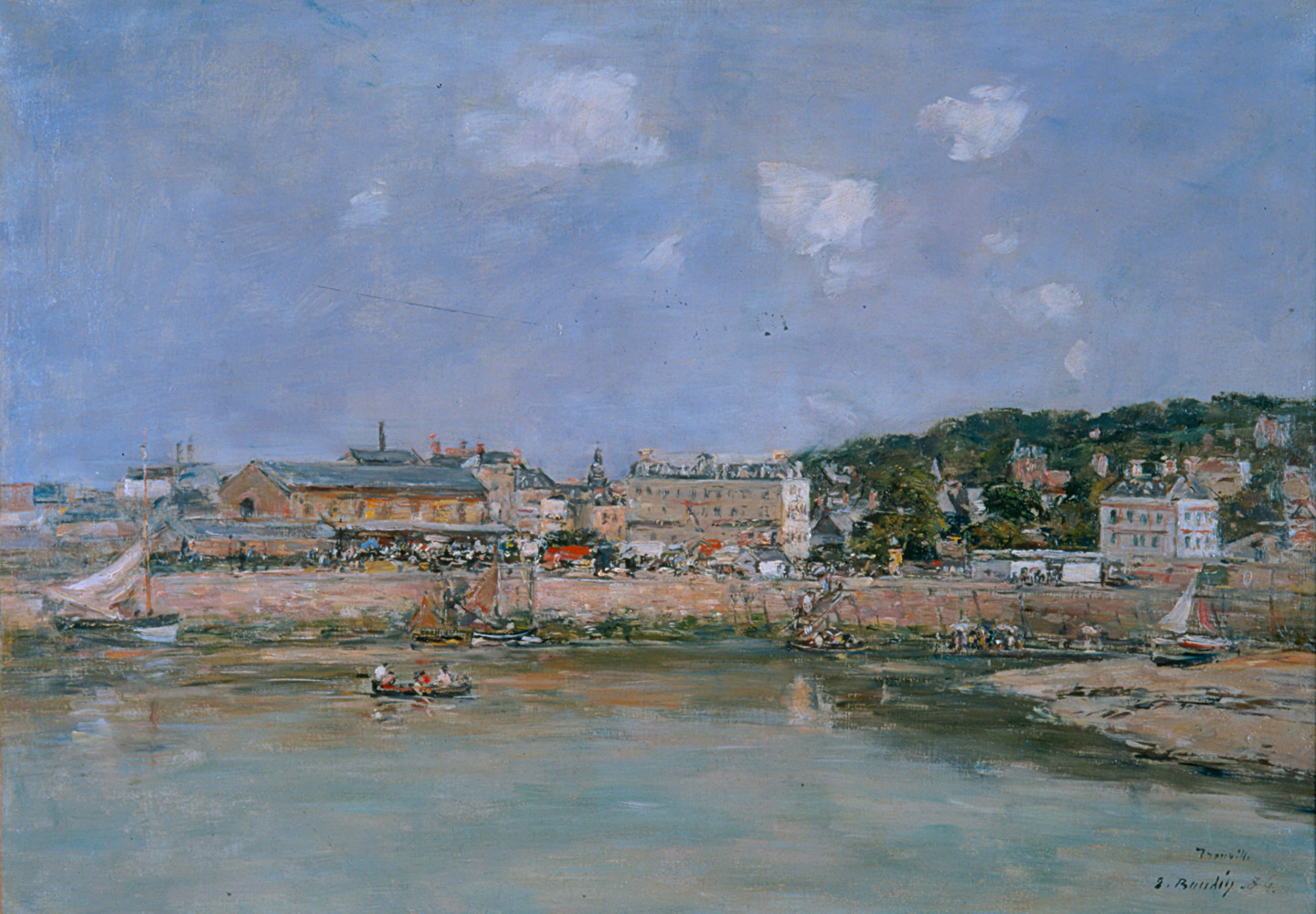
Eugène Boudin. The port of Trouville, 1884.

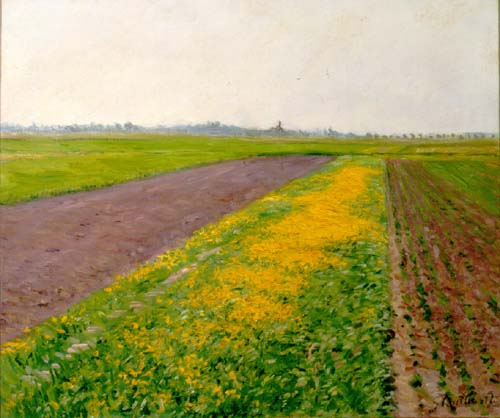
Gustave Caillebotte. The plain of Gennevilliers, 1884.

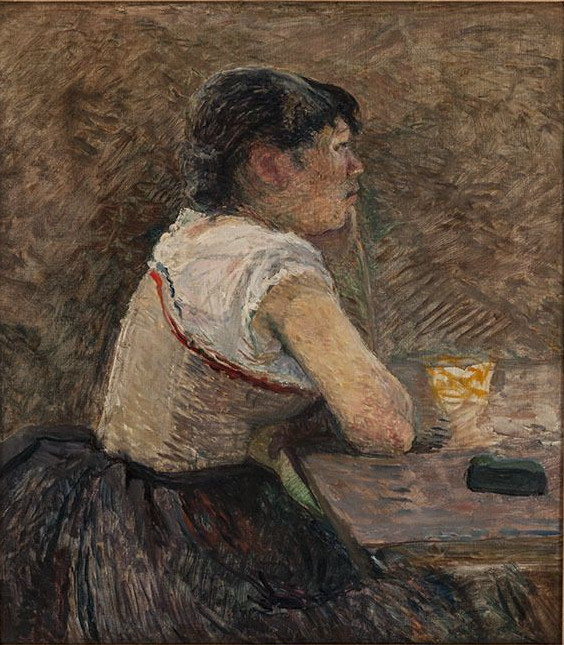
Henri de Toulouse-Lautrec. The absinthe drinker in Grenelle, 1886.

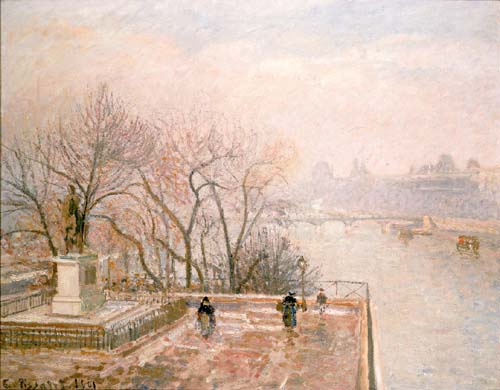
Camille Pissarro. The Louvre, Foggy Morning, 1901.

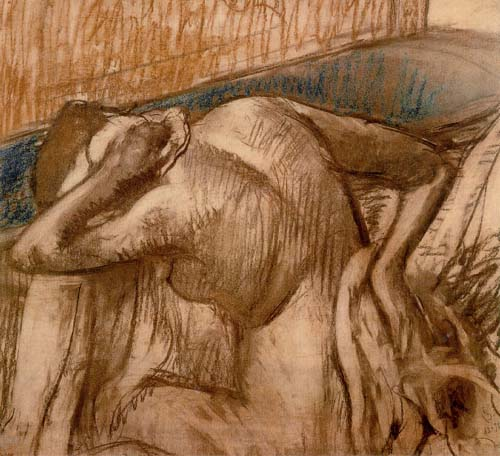
Edgar Degas. Woman in the bathroom, 1902.

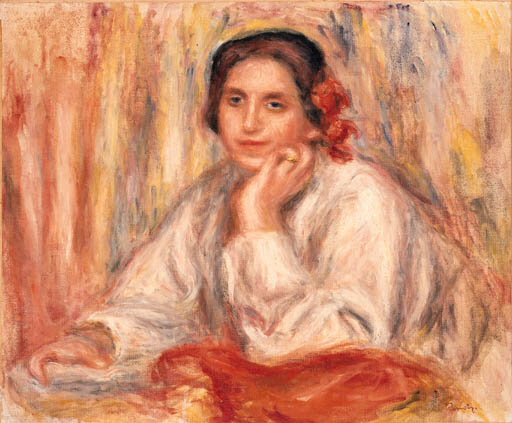
Pierre-Auguste Renoir. Portrait of Véra Sergine, 1914.

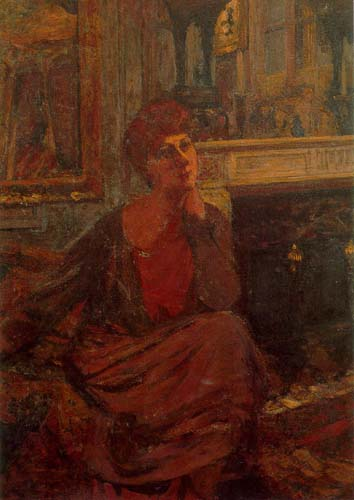
Édouard Vuillard. Madame La Fontaine, 1923.

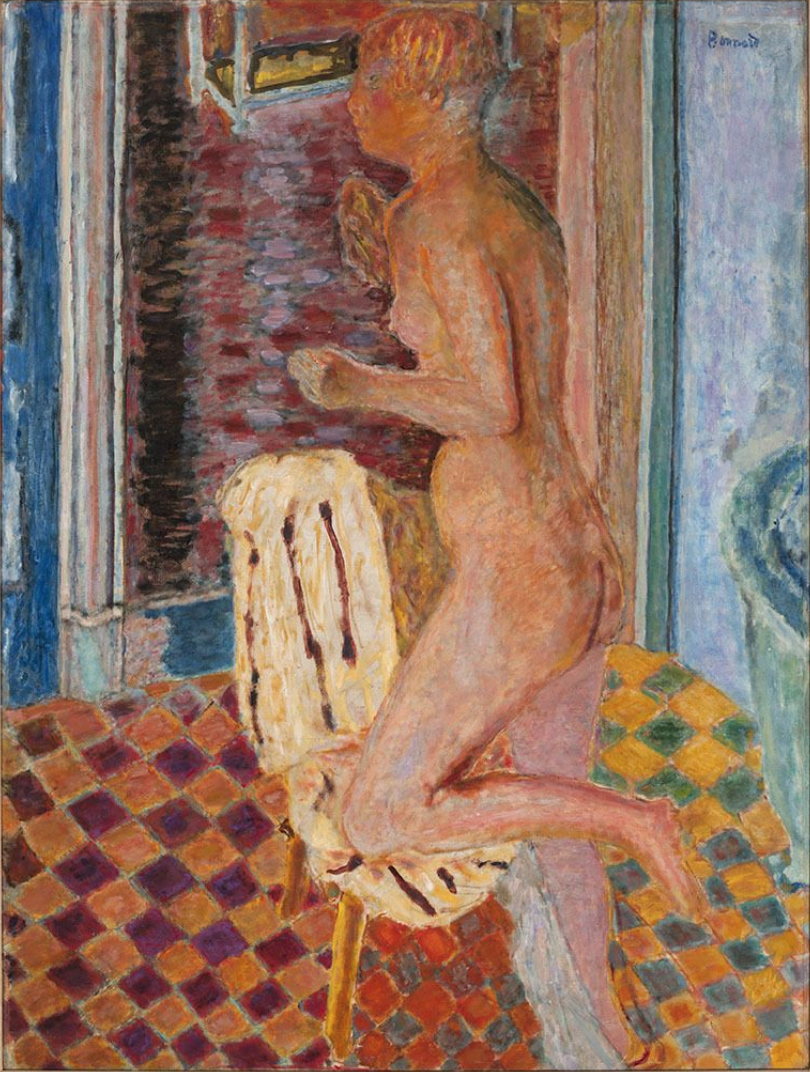
Pierre Bonnard. Nude with chair, 1935 - 1938.

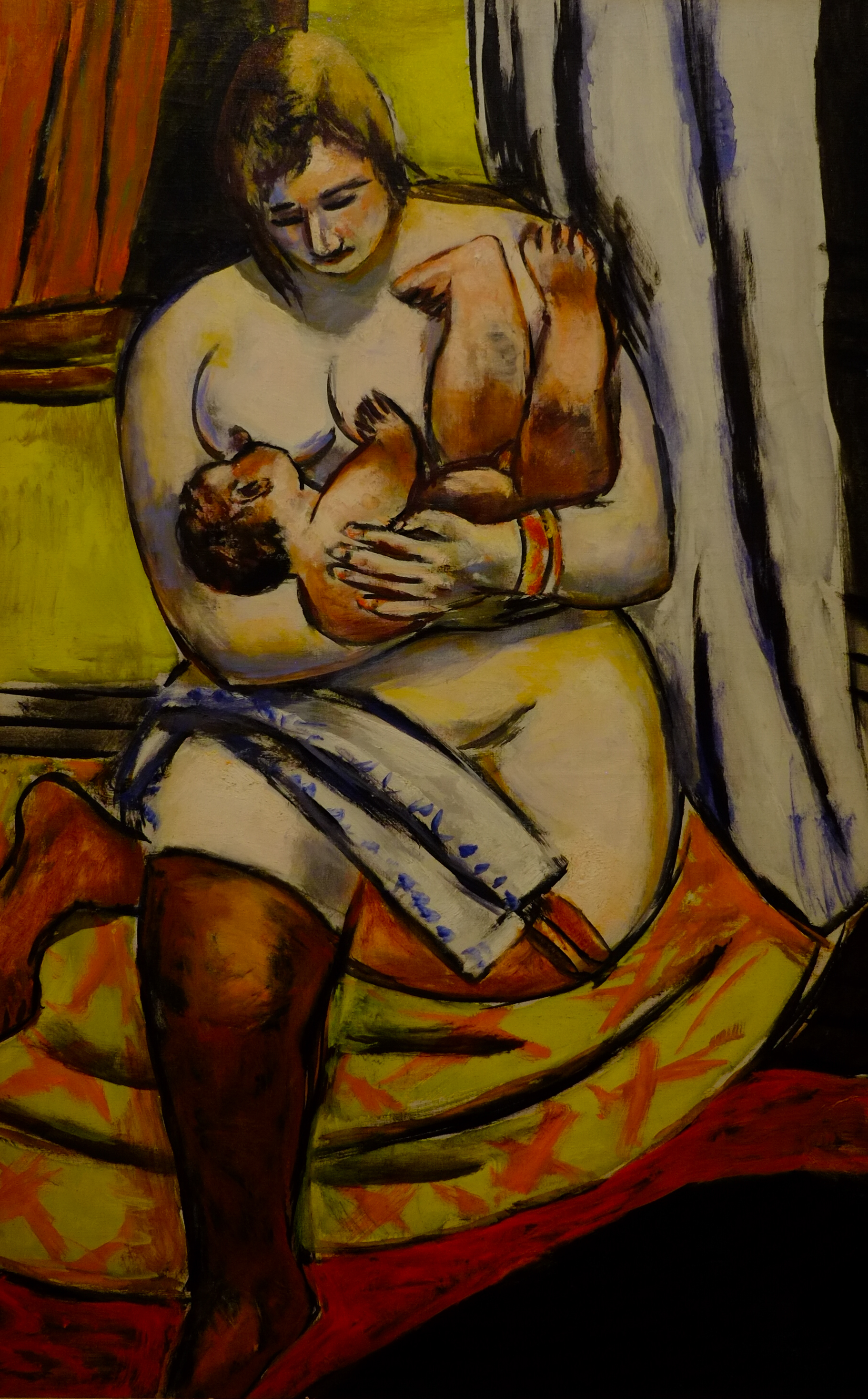
Max Beckmann. Mother and child, 1936.

== See also ==
- National Museum of Colombia
- Gold Museum
