= List of 2023 films based on actual events =

This is a list of films and miniseries released in 2023 that are based on actual events. All films on this list are from American production unless indicated otherwise.

== 2023 ==
- 12.12: The Day (Korean: 서울의 봄) (2023) – South Korean historical action drama film set against the backdrop of the 12 December 1979, military coup from the late 1970s to early 1980s
- 12th Fail (2023) – Indian Hindi-language biographical drama film about Manoj Kumar Sharma, who overcame extreme poverty to become an Indian Police Service officer
- 80 for Brady (2023) – sports comedy film following four lifelong friends who travel to watch Tom Brady and his New England Patriots play in Super Bowl LI in 2017; inspired by a real-life group of Patriots fans known as the "Over 80 for Brady" club
- 800 (2023) – Indian Tamil-language biographical sports drama film based on the life and career of Sri Lankan international cricketer Muttiah Muralitharan, the highest wicket-taker in the history of cricket
- 2018 (2023) – Indian Malayalam-language survival drama film based on the severe 2018 Kerala floods that devastated Kerala
- A Million Miles Away (2023) – biographical drama film detailing the life of José M. Hernández, the first Mexican-American astronaut
- A Small Light (2023) – biographical war drama miniseries telling the story of Miep Gies and how she helped her Jewish employer Otto Frank, his family, and other Jewish refugees go into hiding during World War II after the German invasion of the Netherlands
- Abbé Pierre – A Century of Devotion (French: L'Abbé Pierre – Une vie de combats) (2023) – French biographical drama film based on the life of Abbé Pierre, a Catholic priest and national hero in France who devoted his life to helping the poor, homeless people and refugees
- About My Father (2023) – comedy film loosely based on Sebastian Maniscalco's life and his relationship with his father
- Air (2023) – biographical drama film based on true events about the origin of Air Jordan, a basketball shoeline, of which a Nike employee seeks to strike a business deal with rookie player Michael Jordan
- All the World Is Sleeping (2023) – drama film inspired by the true stories of Carly Hicks, Patricia Marez, Jade Sanchez, Myra Salazar, Kayleigh Smith, Malissa Trujillo, and Doralee Urban, a collective of New Mexico women with their own separate histories of substance abuse
- Angela (2023) – Brazilian crime drama film inspired by the life and murder of Minas Gerais mining socialite Ângela Diniz
- Archie (2023) – British drama miniseries about the life of Cary Grant
- Atatürk 1881 – 1919 (2023) – Turkish epic historical drama film following the life of the founding father of the Republic of Turkey, Mustafa Kemal Atatürk
- Baltimore (2023) – British-Irish biographical thriller film based on the life of Rose Dugdale, a British heiress-turned-IRA member
- Bank of Dave (2023) – British biographical comedy film based on the story of a Burnley working class and self-made millionaire, Dave Fishwick, who struggles to set up a community bank to help the town's local businesses not only survive, but thrive
- Bardot (2023) – French biographical drama miniseries following the career of the actress and model Brigitte Bardot, from her first casting at the age of 15 until the filming of Henri-Georges Clouzot's film La Vérité ten years later
- The Beanie Bubble (2023) – comedy drama film telling the story behind the 1990s Beanie Babies craze
- Bernadette (2023) – French biographical comedy film about Bernadette Chirac, the French politician and the widow of the former president Jacques Chirac
- Big George Foreman (2023) – biographical sports drama film based on the life of world heavyweight boxing champion George Foreman
- BlackBerry (2023) – Canadian biographical comedy drama film about the history of the BlackBerry line of mobile phones
- The Blue Star (Spanish: La estrella azul) (2023) – Spanish-Argentine drama film about 1990s rock star Mauricio Aznar and his life-changing travel to Argentina
- Bonnard, Pierre and Marthe (French: Bonnard, Pierre et Marthe) (2023) – French biographical drama film depicting the love story and romance between the painter Pierre Bonnard and his wife, model, and muse Marthe
- Boston Strangler (2023) – historical crime drama film based on the true story of the Boston Strangler, who in the 1960s killed 13 women in Boston, Massachusetts
- The Boys in the Boat (2023) – biographical sports drama film following the University of Washington rowing team, and their quest to compete in the 1936 Summer Olympics
- Buying Back My Daughter (2023) – drama television film based on a true story of a mother trying to get her daughter back when she goes missing and is placed into sex trafficking
- Cassandro (2023) – biographical drama film following the true story of Cassandro, the exotico character created by Saúl Armendáriz, gay amateur wrestler from El Paso who rose to international stardom
- The Clearing (2023) – Australian psychological thriller miniseries inspired by a fictionalised account of the Australian cult group The Family
- Cocaine Bear (2023) – comedy horror thriller film inspired by the true story of the "Cocaine Bear", an American black bear that ingested nearly 75 lb (34 kg) of lost cocaine
- Comandante (2023) – Italian war drama film telling an episode of the Battle of the Atlantic, when the Italian submarine Comandante Cappellini sunk the Belgian ship Kabalo
- The Crowded Room (2023) – psychological thriller miniseries following Danny Sullivan (a character based on Billy Milligan) after he was arrested for his involvement in a New York City shooting in 1979
- Dance First (2023) – British-Belgian-Hungarian biographical film about Irish playwright Samuel Beckett
- Dark October (2023) – Nigerian drama film centring on the lynching of four young students at University of Port Harcourt, popularly known as the Aluu Four lynching
- Dog Gone (2023) – biographical drama film based on the book Dog Gone: A Lost Pet's Extraordinary Journey and the Family Who Brought Him Home by Pauls Toutonghi
- Dumb Money (2023) – biographical comedy drama film chronicling the GameStop short squeeze of January 2021
- Fairyland (2023) – coming-of-age drama film based on Alysia Abbott's experiences of being raised by her father Steve Abbott, a poet and activist who came out as gay and fell victim to the AIDS crisis
- Ferrari (2023) – biographical sports thriller film following the personal and professional struggles of Enzo Ferrari, the Italian founder of the car manufacturer Ferrari S.p.A., during the summer of 1957
- Firebrand (2023) – British historical drama film focusing on Katherine Parr, Queen of England and the wife and widow of Henry VIII
- Flamin' Hot (2023) – biographical drama film depicting the story of Richard Montañez, the Frito-Lay janitor who claimed to have invented Flamin' Hot Cheetos
- The Gallows Pole (2023) – British-Irish historical miniseries depicting a fictionalized account of the Cragg Vale Coiners at the onset of the industrial revolution in 18th-century Yorkshire
- Girl in the Closet (2023) – crime drama film based on the true story of Lauren Kavanaugh who was locked in a closet for six years and endured physical and sexual abuse by her biological mother and stepfather
- Girl You Know It's True (2023) – biographical film about the controversial late-1980s/early-1990s music duo Milli Vanilli, who caused one of the most infamous scandals in international pop music
- Golda (2023) – American-British biographical drama film depicting the life of Golda Meir, Prime Minister of Israel, particularly during the Yom Kippur War
- The Gold (2023) – British biographical crime drama miniseries about the 1983 Brink's Mat robbery in which £26 million (equivalent to £93.3 million in 2021) worth of gold bullion, diamonds, and cash was stolen from a warehouse near Heathrow Airport
- GomBurZa (2023) – Philippine historical biographical film following the lives of the Gomburza, three native Filipino Roman Catholic priests executed during the latter years of the Spanish colonial era in the Philippines
- Gran Turismo (2023) – biographical coming-of-age sports drama film based on the true story of teenage Gran Turismo player Jann Mardenborough aspiring to be a race car driver
- The Great Escaper (2023) – British biographical comedy drama film based on the true story of a British World War II Royal Navy veteran who in June 2014 "broke out" of his nursing home to attend the 70th anniversary D-Day commemorations in France
- Guardians of the Formula (Serbian: Čuvari formule) (2023) – Serbian drama film following the aftermath of the 1958 reactor incident at Vinča Nuclear Institute and the subsequent treatment of irradiated Yugoslav physicists at the Curie Institute in Paris, which involved the first bone marrow grafts between unrelated donors and hosts ever made in the world
- Gunjal (Urdu: گنجل) (2023) – Pakistani action crime thriller film inspired by the true story of a Pakistani child labour activist Iqbal Masih, who led a movement against child labour in the 1990s before his tragic murder
- He Went That Way (2023) – crime drama film based on an account where the serial killer Larry Ranes encountered animal trainer Dave Pitts, who survived
- The Hill (2023) – biographical sports drama film about baseball player Rickey Hill overcoming a physical handicap in order to try out for a legendary major league scout
- Hit Man (2023) – romantic action comedy film based on the true story of a college professor who worked for the Houston police in the late 1980s and 1990s as a fake hitman, as described in a 2001 magazine article by Skip Hollandsworth
- I Am Ninoy (Filipino: Ako si Ninoy) (2023) – Philippine musical drama film focusing on the lives of 11 Filipinos which draw parallels to the life of Ninoy Aquino
- Ingeborg Bachmann – Journey into the Desert (2023) – biographical drama film depicting the life of Austrian poet and author Ingeborg Bachmann, who lived through 1926 to 1973
- The Iron Claw (2023) – biographical sports film based on the life of professional wrestler Kevin Von Erich and the Von Erich family
- Jeanne du Barry (2023) – biographical historical drama film centring on Madame du Barry, who uses her intelligence and allure to climb the social ladder
- Jesus Revolution (2023) – religious drama film following youth minister Greg Laurie, Christian hippie Lonnie Frisbee, and pastor Chuck Smith as they take part in the Jesus movement in California during the late 1960s
- Jokes & Cigarettes (Catalan: Saben aquell) (2023) – Spanish Catalan-language biographical drama film about comedian Eugenio
- Kandahar (2023) – spy action thriller film following a CIA operative and his translator who flee from Afghanistan after their covert mission is exposed, loosely based on actual events
- The Kerala Story (2023) – Indian Hindi-language drama film following the story of a group of women from Kerala who are converted to Islam and join the Islamic State of Iraq and Syria (ISIS)
- Killers of the Flower Moon (2023) – epic crime drama film centering on a series of Oklahoma murders in the Osage Nation during the 1920s, committed after oil was discovered on tribal land
- Lee (2023) – British biographical drama film about Lee Miller who goes from a career as a model to enlisting as a photographer to chronicle the events of World War II for Vogue magazine
- Little Girl Blue (2023) – French-Belgian biographical drama film based on the life of the writer and set photographer Carole Achache
- Love and Death (2023) – biographical crime drama miniseries based on the true story of Candy Montgomery, who was accused of the brutal axe murder of her friend Betty Gore in 1980
- The Machine (2023) – action comedy film inspired by the 2016 stand-up routine of the same name created by Bert Kreischer
- Maestro (2023) – biographical romantic drama film that centers on the relationship between American composer Leonard Bernstein and his wife Felicia Montealegre
- The Man Who Stood in the Way (Czech: Muž, který stál v cestě) (2023) – Czech historical drama film focusing on František Kriegel, the only political leader who, during the Warsaw Pact invasion of Czechoslovakia, declined to sign the Moscow Protocol
- Marinette (2023) – French biographical sports drama film depicting the life of footballer Marinette Pichon
- Miranda's Victim (2023) – historical crime drama film based on the life of Patricia "Trish" Weir, who was kidnapped and raped by Ernesto Miranda in 1963
- Mission Majnu (2023) – Indian Hindi-language spy thriller film based on true events from the 1970s where an undercover Indian spy takes on a deadly mission to expose a covert nuclear weapons program in the heart of Pakistan
- Mission Raniganj (2023) – Indian Hindi-language disaster thriller film based Raniganj Coalfields collapse of 1989 in West Bengal
- Mrs. Chatterjee vs Norway (2023) – Indian Hindi-language legal drama film based on the real-life story of an Indian couple whose children were taken away by Norwegian authorities in 2011
- Napoleon (2023) – British-American epic biographical war film depicting Napoleon's rise to power through the lens of his addictive and volatile relationship with Empress Joséphine
- Next Goal Wins (2023) – biographical sports comedy drama film about Dutch-American coach Thomas Rongen's efforts to lead the American Samoa national football team, considered the weakest football team in the world, to qualification for the 2014 FIFA World Cup
- Nolly (2023) – British biographical miniseries exploring the reign, and fall from grace of British soap opera star Noele Gordon
- No More Bets (2023) – Chinese crime thriller film based on human trafficking in Southeast Asia and KK Park, produced with the police providing recent online fraud cases
- Nyad (2023) – biographical sports drama film about swimmer Diana Nyad's 2013 attempt to swim the Straits of Florida
- Of Money and Blood (French: D'argent et de sang) (2023) – French crime thriller miniseries about the 2008–2009 carbon tax fraud scandal in France
- One Life (2023) – biographical drama film about British humanitarian Nicholas Winton as he looks back on his past efforts to help groups of Jewish children in German-occupied Czechoslovakia to hide and flee in 1938–39, just before the beginning of World War II
- On a Wing and a Prayer (2023) – biographical survival film based on the 2009 true story of Doug White, an airline passenger who was forced to land the King Air 200 plane he was traveling on with his wife and children after the pilot unexpectedly died mid-flight, with no co-pilot on board
- Oppenheimer (2023) – epic biographical drama film following the life of theoretical physicist J. Robert Oppenheimer, the director of the Los Alamos Laboratory during the Manhattan Project, and his contributions that led to the creation of the atomic bomb
- Origin (2023) – biographical drama film based on the life of Isabel Wilkerson, Wilkerson travels throughout Germany, India, and the United States to research the caste systems in each country's history
- Pain Hustlers (2023) – crime comedy film loosely based on the activities of the real world company Insys Therapeutics and their role in the US opioid crisis
- Painkiller (2023) – biographical drama miniseries focusing on the birth of the opioid crisis, with an emphasis on Purdue Pharma, a company owned by Richard Sackler and his family that was the manufacturer of OxyContin
- Partygate (2023) – British satirical political drama television film dramatising the political scandal dubbed "Partygate" in British politics during the prime ministerial government of Boris Johnson
- The Pope's Exorcist (2023) – supernatural horror film based on the 1990 book An Exorcist Tells His Story and the 1992 book An Exorcist: More Stories by Father Gabriele Amorth
- Priscilla (2023) – biographical drama film following the life of Priscilla Presley and her complicated romantic relationship with Elvis Presley
- The Promised Land (Danish: Bastarden) (2023) – Danish epic historical drama film depicting the story of Danish soldier and explorer Ludvig von Kahlen, who explored and cultivated Denmark's wild Jutland, which now comprises the vast majority of the country, in the mid-18th century
- Radical (2023) – Mexican comedy drama film based on the 2013 Wired article, "A Radical Way of Unleashing a Generation of Geniuses" by Joshua Davis
- Reality (2023) – biographical drama film depicting the interrogation of whistleblower Reality Winner, a former enlisted US Air Force member and NSA translator, leaked an intelligence report about Russian interference in the 2016 United States elections to the news website The Intercept
- Reba McEntire's The Hammer (2023) – biographical drama television film inspired by the life of Kim Wheeler, one of the last traveling circuit judges in the U.S.
- Road to Boston (Korean: 보스톤) (2023) – South Korean biographical sports film telling the story of Korean athletes who participated in the Boston International Marathon in 1947, the first international marathon held since World War II
- Rustin (2023) – biographical drama film based on the true story of gay civil rights activist Bayard Rustin, who helped Martin Luther King Jr. and others organize the 1963 March on Washington
- Seneca – On the Creation of Earthquakes (German: Seneca – Oder: Über die Geburt von Erdbeben) (2023) – German-Moroccan historical dark comedy drama film about the last days of the ancient philosopher Lucius Annaeus Seneca and the beginnings of Emperor Nero's despotic regime in Ancient Rome
- Shooting Stars (2023) – biographical sports drama film about the high school sports career of LeBron James
- Sight (2023) – biographical drama film about Ming Wang, a Chinese immigrant to the United States who became a renowned eye surgeon
- Sisi & I (German: Sisi & Ich) (2023) – German-Swiss-Austrian historical biographical film telling the story of Empress Elisabeth of Austria from the point of view of her lady-in-waiting, Irma Sztáray
- The Sixth Commandment (2023) – British crime drama miniseries exploring the deaths of Peter Farquhar and Ann Moore-Martin in Buckinghamshire in 2014 and 2017 and the subsequent events including the police investigation and 2019 criminal trial of Ben Field
- Society of the Snow (Spanish: La sociedad de la nieve) (2023) – survival thriller film about the Uruguayan 1972 Andes flight disaster
- Sound of Freedom (2023) – crime thriller film about Tim Ballard, a former U.S. government agent who embarks on a mission to rescue children from sex traffickers in Colombia
- Spinning Gold (2023) – biographical drama film based on the life and career of record producer and Casablanca Records founder Neil Bogart, who was credited with discovering many iconic musical acts such as Donna Summer, Kiss, Village People
- Steeltown Murders (2023) – British biographical drama miniseries based on the real-life murders committed by Joseph Kappen in Port Talbot in South Wales
- Stonehouse (2023) – British biographical comedy drama miniseries dramatising the life and times of disgraced British government minister John Stonehouse
- Sweetwater (2023) – biographical sports film about Nat Clifton, the first African-American to sign a contract with the National Basketball Association (NBA)
- Tarla (2023) – Indian Hindi-language biographical drama film about Indian chef and cookbook author Tarla Dalal
- The Teacher Who Promised the Sea (Spanish: El maestro que prometió el mar) (2023) – Spanish historical drama film about the Catalan teacher Antoni Benaiges
- Tetris (2023) – biographical thriller film based on true events around the race to license and patent the video game Tetris in the late 1980s during the Cold War
- Trial By Fire (2023) – Indian Hindi-language crime drama miniseries depicting two parents struggles with the Indian justice system following the Uphaar Cinema fire
- True Spirit (2023) – Australian biographical drama film based on the true story of Jessica Watson, an Australian sailor who was awarded the Order of Australia Medal after attempting a solo global circumnavigation at the age of 16
- Untameable (Spanish: Cristo y Rey) (2023) – Spanish biographical drama miniseries following the toxic relationship between circus tamer Ángel Cristo and actress Bárbara Rey
- The Vaccine War (2023) – Indian Hindi-language medical biographical drama film about the development of Covaxin during the COVID-19 pandemic in India, shedding light on the efforts of scientists involved in its creation
- Waco: The Aftermath (2023) – biographical drama miniseries dramatizing the 1993 standoff between the Federal Bureau of Investigation (FBI), the Bureau of Alcohol, Tobacco, Firearms and Explosives (ATF), and the Branch Davidians in Waco, Texas
- Warnie (2023) – Australian drama miniseries based on the life of cricketer Shane Warne
- White House Plumbers (2023) – satirical political drama miniseries based on the true story of Watergate masterminds and President Richard Nixon's political operatives E. Howard Hunt and G. Gordon Liddy, part of the “White House Plumbers” charged with plugging press leaks by any means necessary, accidentally overturn the Presidency they were trying to protect
- Wicked Little Letters (2023) – British black comedy mystery film based on a true scandal that stunned 1920s England, the story centres on neighbours Edith Swan and Rose Gooding in the seaside town of Littlehampton
- Wildcat (2023) – biographical drama film about American novelist Flannery O'Connor struggling to publish her first novel
- Woman of the Hour (2023) – crime thriller film based on the factual incident of Rodney Alcala appearing in 1978 on the television show The Dating Game before he was captured in 1979 and identified as a serial killer for murdering numerous women and girls
- The Zone of Interest (2023) – historical drama film centering on Auschwitz commandant Rudolf Höss and his wife as they strive to build a dream life next to the concentration camp
