= LIFT International =

Anti-human trafficking organisation in Southeast Asia

- Formation: 2009
- Founder: Daniel Walker
- Type: Non-profit organization
- Website: www.liftinternational.org

LIFT International, formerly known as Nvader, is a faith-based, non-governmental organisation (NGO), whose mission is "combatting sex trafficking." Nvader investigators go undercover in brothels in Southeast Asia to rescue victims of sex trafficking. Victims are identified, removed from the premises, and placed into aftercare facilities. Nvader investigators collect evidence to be used in prosecuting those guilty of trafficking and trafficking-related offences.

== Background ==
Nvader was founded in 2009 by Daniel Walker (a pseudonym), a former police detective from Christchurch, New Zealand. The organisation became operational in 2012 and its first deployment to Southeast Asia occurred in October 2012.

During those same years, while working for American organisations, he conducted undercover investigations inside 13 countries in total. He would pose as a potential client, or a sex tour operator, in order to find victims of sex trafficking. He would use cameras to record transactions and speak to victims to gather evidence that could be used to prosecute those guilty of trafficking and trafficking-related offences.

Walker noted that during this work best practices were often not applied. He often went on solo missions and was not properly debriefed. Walker applied the knowledge gained during these four years toward the creation and operation of Nvader. Some of the best practices the organisation uses include deployments of no longer than two weeks at a time and debriefing sessions for workers after every trip. Investigators work in a team, receive daily briefing and debriefing, clinical psychological supervision, and team members' spouses are included in planning and decision making.

In 2018, Nvader changed its name to LIFT International.

== Work ==
Nvader rescued women and children from sex work in Laos and Thailand, with victims coming from other places such as Myanmar and Vietnam. Thailand and Laos serve as source, destination and transit countries for all types of human trafficking. The 2015 United States Department of State Trafficking in Persons Report notes that "sex trafficking remains a significant problem in Thailand's extensive sex trade". The United Nations Office on Drugs and Crime 2014 Global Report on Trafficking in Persons reports that between 2010 and 2012, 26% of human trafficking victims in East Asia, South Asia and the Pacific were subjected to sexual exploitation.

Nvader's strategy included partnering with law enforcement agencies, building relationships with other NGOs, working with UN agencies and government departments.

== Successes ==
In 2014 New Zealand publication Stuff reported Nvader as having as successfully removing 40 women and children from sex trafficking in Southeast Asia and helping to prosecute 14 sex traffickers during 2013. By February 2014 Nvader had rescued 22 more women and children. Nvader's noted goal is to rescue 200,000 sex trafficking victims by 2024.

== See also ==
- Human trafficking
- Commercial sexual exploitation of children
- Forced prostitution
- Sex trafficking of women and children in Thailand
- Human trafficking in Southeast Asia
