= Fruit Bowl on a Table =

Painting by Pierre Bonnard

- French: Coupe de fruits sur une table
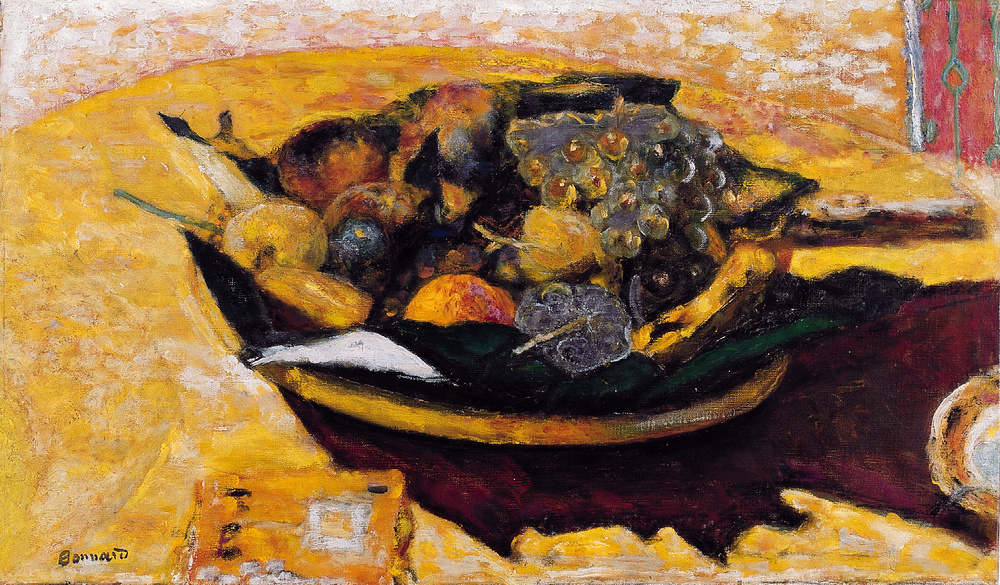
- Artist: Pierre Bonnard
- Year: c. 1934
- Medium: Oil on canvas
- Movement: Post-Impressionism; Nabis
- Subject: still life with fruit (apples, grapes) and a book
- Dimensions: 41 cm × 65.5 cm (16 in × 25.8 in)
- Location: Musée d'Art moderne et contemporain, Strasbourg
- Accession: 1995

Fruit Bowl on a Table is a c. 1934 still-life oil painting by the French artist Pierre Bonnard which was bought by the city of Strasbourg in 1995 from the heiresses of Claude Roger-Marx. Today this painting is in the Musée d'Art moderne et contemporain.

The painting, with its slightly distorted perspective and its contrast of warm colors with dark shadows displays the late Bonnard's characteristic search for new means to depict space. It is one of several still life paintings he created in that decade.
