= Marthe Bonnard =

French painter

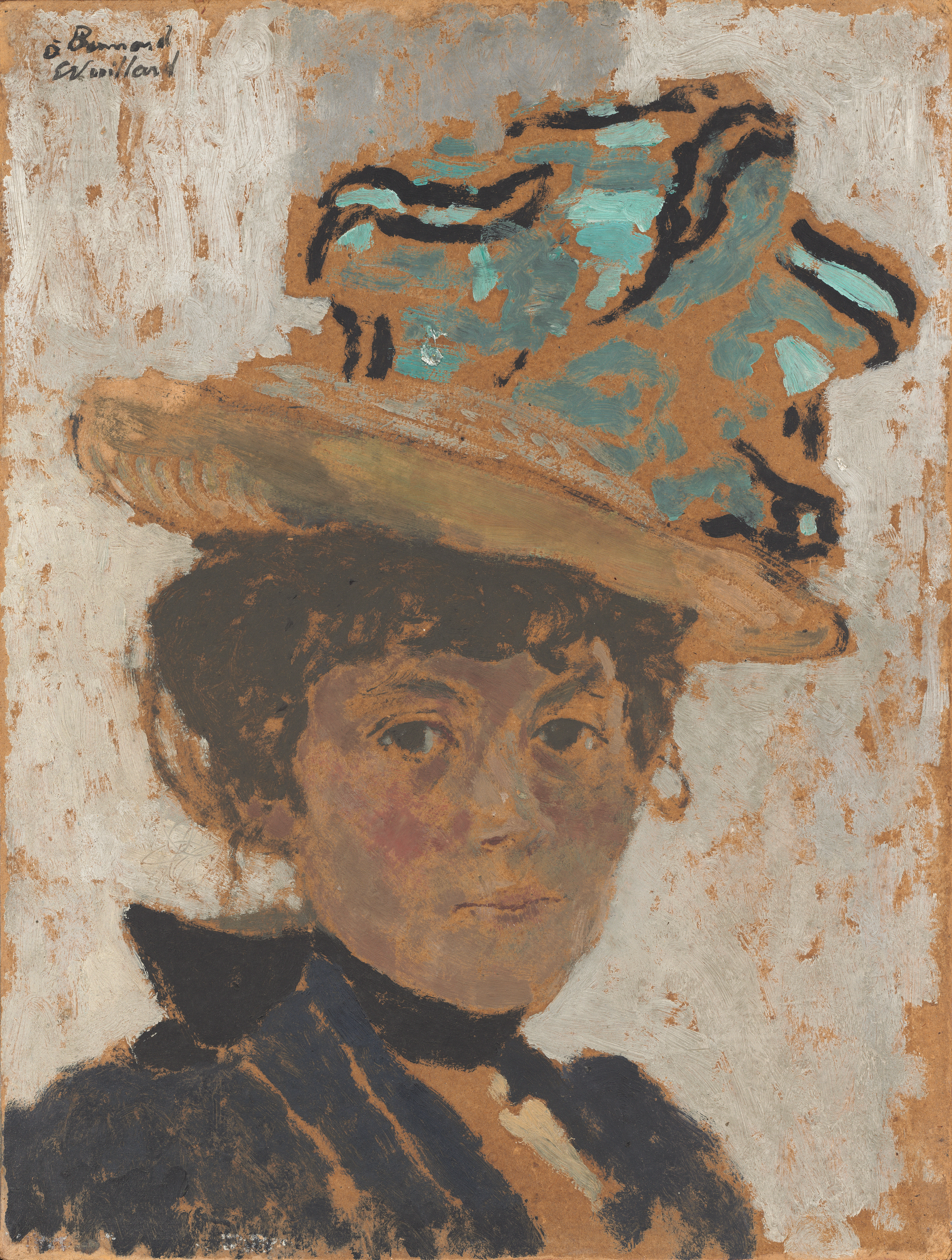
Marthe Bonnard, in a portrait by Édouard Vuillard

Marthe Bonnard (born 22 February 1869 in Saint-Amand-Montrond - died 26 January 1942 in Le Cannet) was a French painter best known as the muse, mistress and later wife of Pierre Bonnard.

Marthe Bonnard was born as Maria Boursin, and met Bonnard in 1893. After Pierre Bonnard's death, Marthe Bonnard was named as "Marthe de Méligny" in litigation at the French Court of Cassation.

== See also ==
- Bonnard, Pierre and Marthe, a 2023 French film that depicts the love story and romance between the painter Pierre Bonnard and his wife, model, and muse Marthe
