= Bonnard, Pierre and Marthe =

2023 film

- French: Bonnard, Pierre et Marthe
- Directed by: Martin Provost
- Written by: Martin Provost
- Produced by: François Kraus; Denis Pineau-Valencienne
- Starring: Vincent Macaigne; Cécile de France
- Cinematography: Guillaume Schiffman
- Edited by: Tina Baz
- Music by: Michael Galasso
- Production company: Les Films du Kiosque
- Distributed by: Memento Distribution
- Release dates: 21 May 2023 (Cannes); 10 January 2024 (France)
- Running time: 122 minutes
- Country: France
- Language: French
- Budget: €7,950,000
- Box office: $2.4 million

Bonnard, Pierre and Marthe (French: Bonnard, Pierre et Marthe) is a 2023 French film written and directed by Martin Provost. The film depicts the love story and romance between the painter Pierre Bonnard and his wife, model, and muse Marthe.

The film stars Cécile de France as Marthe and Vincent Macaigne as Pierre. It had its world premiere in the Cannes Premiere section at the 76th Cannes Film Festival on 21 May 2023.

Chronoglogically the film is divided into four parts of the couple's life together [the] "early days", 1914, 1918, and later during the war years in 1942.

== Plot ==
Before WWI starts, young artist Pierre Bonnard is taken with Marthe's good looks before he even knows her name. He invites her to pose for him in his studio and she agrees. During the modeling, Pierre asks her to pose nude for him and she protests. Their bickering upon the point of her nudity suddenly results in passionate love-making and Marthe spends the night with him. Over the next few days, they become an item spending more and more time together until Pierre suggests that the two of them move in together and start living as a couple. At first, she refuses his offer. Pierre continues to pursue her and eventually declares himself as not being able to live without her, which touches her deeply.

Marthe eventually relents and the two become a couple. When an exhibition for Pierre's works takes place his works are well received, however, Marthe is chagrined about appearing at the exhibit where many of Pierre's nudes of her are to be exhibited. She goes home without seeing the exhibit, though the two continue to live together in a large country home which they are renting by a scenic lake. Marthe starts to ask Pierre about having a child together, but Pierre only thinks of children as a distraction and declines her offer to start a family. In spite of it all, the two continue their amorous lovemaking both indoors and in secluded areas outdoors. At one point, Marthe seems to become ill and a doctor is consulted. On his way out of their home, the doctor confides in Pierre that Marthe has a weak heart and that, with his regrets, she appears to have not long to live.

By August 1914, Pierre is still concerned about Marthe's health. Claude Monet and his model comes for a visit to Pierre's home and the two take a stroll along the lake to a special spot Pierre has found for a waterscape of the local flora. Claude agrees and the two start to sketh and make plein air watercolors of the waterscape and flora. Marthe prepares dinner for a picnic later on and Édouard Vuillard joins them for the meal where they discuss possible plans to visit Egypt.

== Cast ==
- Vincent Macaigne as Pierre Bonnard
- Cécile de France as Marthe de Méligny
- Stacy Martin as Renée
- Anouk Grinberg as Misia Sert
- Grégoire Leprince-Ringuet as Édouard Vuillard
- André Marcon as Claude Monet
- Philippe Richardin as Maurice Denis

== Production ==
The film was produced by François Kraus and Denis Pineau-Valencienne at Les Films du Kiosque. It was co-produced by France 3 Cinema, Volapuk and Belgium's Umedia.

Filming did not take place in the artist's original house in Le Cannet, as Provost did not want the film to be too integrated into the city. He needed "more space and nature" for the film. Instead, he filmed the scenes at Domaine d'Orvès in La Valette-du-Var. The film was partially shot in the city of Toulon and its surrounding area, located in the south of France.

== Release ==
The film was selected to be screened in the Cannes Premiere section of the 76th Cannes Film Festival, where it had its world premiere on 21 May 2023. The film was distributed in France by Memento Distribution on 10 January 2024.

== Reception ==
Screen International's Lisa Nesselson calls the film ..."a touching, visually fetching and educational look at the intertwining of art and stubborn romance".
