= Claude Roger-Marx =

French art historian (1888–1977)

- Born: Jules Anne Claude Marx; 12 November 1888; 9th arrondissement of Paris, French Third Republic
- Died: 17 May 1977 (aged 88); 16th arrondissement of Paris, France
- Education: University of Paris, Faculty of Law
- Occupations: Writer; playwright; art critic; art collector; art history
- Spouse: Florestine "Mayotte" Caroline Marie Nathan (m. 1912)
- Children: 2, including Denis Roger-Marx
- Parents: Roger Marx (father); Elisa Cécile Nathan (mother)
- Relatives: Gabrielle Rosenthal (cousin)
- Writing career
- Pen name: Claudinet; Claude Roger Marx
- Notable awards: Légion d'honneur, chevalier, 1927; Légion d'honneur, commandeur, 1956

Claude Roger-Marx (1888–1977) was a French writer, playwright, art critic, art collector and art historian.

== Early life and education ==
Claude Roger-Marx was born Jules Anne Claude Marx on 12 November 1888 in Paris, to Roger Marx and Elisa Cécile Nathan (1859–1933).

In 1906, Roger-Marx graduated with his baccalauréat. Roger-Marx then studied at the University of Paris Faculty of Law.

== Career ==
Roger-Marx published two novels, before he wrote plays. In 1927 he became a chevalier of the Légion d'honneur. Roger Marx's art collection included Edouard Manet's La Sultan and Paul Signac's Voiles dans la brume. Canal de la Giudecca. He also used the pen name Claudine'.

=== Nazi persecution in France ===
When Nazi Germany invaded France in 1940 in World War II, Jews were persecuted. Roger-Marx, who was Jewish, was suspended from his duties in December 1940. He fled to Marseille in 1941, and in 1943 to Isère. His art collection was seized by the E.R.R., the Nazi looting organization operating in France. His son, Denis, was imprisoned by the Gestapo and executed on February 25, 1944.

=== Postwar ===
His real career as critic and art historian started after the war. He was a great admirer of art, and became inspector of the Écoles des Beaux-Arts (schools of fine arts). He also was chroniqueur attitré of the Figaro, especially the Figaro Littéraire, its literary supplement, as well as of the Revue de Paris. In 1956 he was made commander of the Légion d'honneur.

== Personal life ==
In 1912, Roger-Marx married Florestine "Mayotte" Caroline Marie Nathan. The couple had two children, Paulette (1913–1994) and the French Resistance fighter Denis Roger-Marx (1922–1944).

== Works ==
Novels

- Les Deux Amis, novel, Albin Michel, 1921
- La Tragédie légère, novel, Albin Michel, 1922

Comedies

- Simili, comedy in three acts, Stock, 1930
- Dimanche, comedy in one act, Andrieu frères, 1934
- Biens oisifs, comedy in one act, Stock, 1936
- Lecture, comedy in one act, Stock, 1936
- La Pensionnaire, comedy in three acts, Lejeune, 1936
- Réussite, comedy in one act, Librairie théâtrale, 1936
- 80 printemps, ou les Ardeurs de l'hiver, comedy in one act, Lejeune, 1936
- Nino, comedy in one act, Les Annales, 1937
- Marie ou la Manière douce, comedy in three acts, Denoël, 1938

Art historical works

- Graphic art [of] the 19th century
- Vuillard: His Life & Work, Paul Elek 1946
- Les Lithographies de Renoir, André Sauret, Monte-Carlo, 1952
- Degas: Dancers
- Delacroix (The Great Draughtsmen)
- Dufy: At the races (The petite library of art)
- Dunoyer De Segonzac, 1951
- Daumier: Paintings
- Les Lithographies de Toulouse-Lautrec
- La Gravure originale en France de Manet à nos jours (French Original Prints from Manet to the Present Time)
- Bonnard
- Vertès: Un et divers
