= Human trafficking in Southeast Asia =

Human trafficking in Southeast Asia has long been a problem for the area and is still prevalent today. It has been observed that as economies continue to grow, the demand for labor is at an all-time high in the industrial sector and the sex tourism sector. A mix of impoverished individuals and the desire for more wealth creates an environment for human traffickers to benefit in the Southeast Asia region. Many nations within the region have taken preventive measures to end human trafficking within their borders and punish traffickers operating there.

== Nature of the problem ==
Human trafficking, is defined by the United Nations Office on Drugs and Crime (UNODC) in their Protocol to Prevent, Suppress and Punish Trafficking in Persons document as “the recruitment, transportation, transfer, harboring or receipt of persons, by means of the threat or use of force or other forms of coercion, of abduction, of fraud, of deception, of the abuse of power or of a position of vulnerability or of the giving or receiving of payments or benefits to achieve the consent of a person having control over another person, for the purpose of exploitation.” This definition applies to harvesting of organs, slavery or forced labor, and sexual exploitation. According to an International Labour Organization (ILO) a report using a methodology based on national surveys reported, as recently as 2012, 20.9 million people were being held against their will in various forms of forced labor around the world. The majority of these laborers were women at 55% and males at 45%. According to Besler, annual profits from industries specializing in forced labor have averaged 44.3 billion dollars in 2005.

Beyond the scope Southeast Asia, the Asia-Pacific region contains the largest number of forced laborers anywhere in the world but only has a prevalence rate of 3.3 per 1000, which is one of the lower prevalence rates when compared by region. This is because the Asia-Pacific region has a much larger population when compared to the rest of the world's regions. In Southeast Asia human trafficking is widely regarded as interregional with laborers being collected from countries within the region and ultimately working within the region. Victims from Southeast Asia have also been found in many other countries around the globe. In Southeast Asia human trafficking consists of forced sexual labor and forced labor which, in many countries in Southeast Asia, can lead to mixed forms of human trafficking. In Thailand and Malaysia trafficking mainly takes the form of sexual exploitation, while in Indonesia forced labor is observed is more prevalent, but both forms of sexual and forced labor can be found. It is estimated that 10,000 laborers are deceived or captured into forced labor annually in the region.

== Causes ==
The main causes of human trafficking in Southeast Asia are universal factors such as poverty and globalization. According to Betz, poverty is not the root of human trafficking and that there are other factors such as the desire to have access to upward mobility and knowledge on the wealth that can be gained from working in urban cities, that ultimately attracts impoverished individuals to human traffickers. Betz claims the industrialization of the region in the mid 20th century led to a clear division between growing economies and stagnant ones. This industrialization of booming economies, like that of Thailand and Singapore created a draw for poor migrants seeking upward mobility and individuals wanting to leave war torn countries. These migrants were an untapped resource in growing economies that had already exhausted the cheap labor from within its borders. A high supply of migrant workers seeking employment and high demand from an economy seeking cheap labor creates a perfect combination for human traffickers to thrive. Still in the new millennium the market for forced labor is profitable; class-divisions and the economies' need for unskilled labor keep traffickers in the market.

The sex industry emerged in Southeast Asia in the mid 20th century as a way for women to generate more income for struggling migrants and locals trying to support families or themselves. Nicola Piper claims the industry's growth throughout the region can be attributed to growing tourism and military bases that dotted the region during times of major wars. Sex industries first catered to military personnel on leave from bases but as military installations began to recede the industry turned its attention to growing tourism. With little intervention from governments due to potential harm to the tourism market, the sex industry's growth was uninhibited. Even as the industry is looked down upon today there is still a large underground market that is demanding from traffickers.

Although many factors play into the human trafficking crisis in Southeast Asia, socioeconomic status is one of the main contributors to the issue. People who live in poverty and poor living conditions become huge targets to traffickers. The people in the villages of Southeast Asia who are desperate for work, are being promised jobs, and then being forced into slavery or sold for ransom (Yang 2–3). Many victims are kept in camps where they are often even killed. The largest form of human trafficking consists of prostitution, involving primarily women and children. In many of these remote villages in Southeast Asia, prostitution and trafficking are sadly unavoidable. This financial crisis has even led to some people selling themselves into prostitution or falling into false opportunities for work (Yang 3). It has even been believed that parents in Thailand have sold their children directly into the sex industry due to their need for money (Ecpat). This is proof of the great need in Southeast Asia for financial and economic help.

Another heartbreaking factor that has contributed to human trafficking in Southeast Asia is the rise in child pornography. Young children as young as twelve years old are taken to Thailand to engage in commercial sex work (Ecpat). It is a terrifying reality that the increased usage of the internet by children has led to a rise in incidents of violence and sexual exploitation. Many sexual offenders use technology to contact or deceive children. Within the past year, approximately 20% of children between the ages of twelve and seventeen who use the internet have been a victim of sexual exploitation or abuse (UNICEF). This can be prevented by spreading awareness about online predators and providing children with a safe place to tell someone if they experience or witness any of these things.

The lack of effective law enforcement is another issue that has been found to contribute to Southeast Asia's human trafficking crisis. Most countries have recognized human trafficking as a pressing issue but some countries, Indonesia being one, have taken little to no action to prevent the issue. There was no law in Indonesia specifically against sex trafficking until the year of 2003 (Betz 63). There have also been loopholes found in the laws of Southeast Asia regarding the age of consent and child pornography which have led to exploitation and the production and distribution of child pornography (Rahamathulla). The enforcement of laws pertaining to human trafficking and sexual exploitation could be a huge step towards justice for victims and survivors of trafficking.

== Source countries ==
Philippines is a source country and transit country when it comes to forced labor and sexual exploitation. Thailand is one of the biggest suppliers of forced labor in the Southeast Asia region and around the globe. Most of the forced laborers are brought in from nearby Southeast Asian countries like Myanmar, Malaysia, Indonesia, Laos, Vietnam and Cambodia. Migrants voluntarily migrate into Thailand where they can end up in forced labor or sold into its own sex industry.

Laos is labeled as a source country of men, women, and children for the sex slave industry and the forced labor industry. Many of the Lao migrants move to countries like Thailand or are sent to China from a transit country. Lao migrants are mainly flowed into sectors of intensive labor with little pay. 70 percent of migrants from Laos are female and many of them are sought for the use of domestic labor. In Thailand there are no labor protection for domestic workers, which can lead to risks for the migrant Lao females.

Cambodia is a source country for migrants due to high levels of unemployment and poverty. This leaves natives with little opportunity and high levels of risk for human trafficking. Many Cambodian women are trafficked into sexual or labor industries, while men are trafficked into the fishing, agricultural and construction sectors in many countries within the Southeast Asian region.

Myanmar's history of rule under a military regime is one of the reasons the country is considered a source country. The regime's poor management of the economy and human rights abuse put the countries citizens at risk for human trafficking. Men, women and children are subject to labor exploitation in Thailand, China, Pakistan, South Korea and Macau. Children are trafficked in Thailand to be forced into begging, while young girls are trafficked into China to work in the sex slave industry.

== Destination countries ==
Philippines is a destination country in addition to being source country. Migrants from several countries looking for work are attracted to Thailand's promising economy. Thailand's economy also heavily relies on migrant workers because it is strongly labor-intensive, with major sectors being construction, fishing and commercial agriculture.

Cambodia is a destination country for females being trafficked into the sex trade industry. Cambodia has one of the largest sources of demand for child prostitution and sex tourism in the region. Females are brought from rural regions of Cambodia and Vietnam to major cities where they are sold or sexually exploited.

Vietnam is a destination country for children who are subjected to forced sexual labor and labor trafficking. Children from rural areas of the country are brought into major cities where through threats and debt-bondage are forced into the sex trade, begging industry, and industrial sectors. With Vietnam being a destination for child sex tourism, the large demand gives traffickers incentives to recruit children into the trade.

== Victims ==
Most of the victims that are currently working under forced labor conditions are doing so because they were either mislead about job opportunities or were enslaved or forced to against their will. According to a policy brief on human trafficking in Southeast Asia, although victims include girls, women, boys, and men the majority are women. Women tend to be more highly targeted by traffickers because they are seeking opportunity in an area of the world where limited economic opportunities are available for them. Unskilled and poorly educated women are commonly led into human trafficking. According to the UNODC report, the numbers for women and men in forced labor may be skewed because only a few countries released the numbers for adult men. The forced labor market in this region also is dominated by male adults and females while the trade of children is evident it is considered small in comparison to the total. Most of these workers are undocumented and from different countries of origin than the country they work in. Countries like Thailand and Laos attract migrants of similar cultural backgrounds and language. Ethnic majority migrants from Laos are attracted to the similarities between the two countries and migrate to Thailand where they can assimilate easily. The combination of undocumented workers and similar cultures can cause problems for authorities to properly document and estimate the number of trafficked persons without confusing them for illegal immigrants and locals.

== Traffickers ==
Three countries provided data showing that in Southeast Asia, more women are prosecuted than men for crimes in human trafficking. The data also show that the participation rates among females in the trafficking business is trending equal to or higher than males. Traffickers in Southeast Asia are of both genders but, in this region, female proportions are higher than that of ones in the Americas or in Africa. Japan reported that traffickers of foreign nationalities have been increasing over the past several years. In 2006 up until 2009, 7 percent of persons convicted were foreign nationals while in 2009 that number had risen to 23 percent.

== Prevention policies ==
The United Nations (UN) has released guidelines on how human trafficking can be prevented on an international scale. According to the guidelines nations should identify demand as a major cause for trafficking to exist. It is also recommended that poverty, inequality and discrimination be examined as these factors, depending on prevalence, can lead to trafficking. According to a report on human trafficking prevention, it is recommended that it is the government's job to improve the options that are available to its citizens and migrants through various programs that will lead to an overall improved life. Education on various opportunities and the many dangers of migrating through the help of human traffickers. Governments can also help by increasing law enforcement against traffickers to meet legal obligations and by providing proper identification to all citizens.

The Protocol to Prevent, Suppress and Punish Trafficking in Persons, especially Women and Children (sometimes referred to as the Trafficking Protocol) was created by the UN in order to help nations with human trafficking issues. Its main purposes are to create a guideline to initiate measures to prevent and combat human trafficking within the countries borders. The protocol is also used for the assistance and protection of the victims associated with human trafficking, while also creating cooperation between the parties of the state. All nations within Southeast Asia have signed and ratified this protocol. The most recent country to ratify the protocol is Thailand, in 2013.

The United Nations International Convention on the Protection of the Rights of All Migrant Workers and Members of Their Families is an agreement that aims to make connections between human rights and migrant workers as well as their families. The agreement stresses the importance of migrant labor and the recognition that should be rewarded to the migrant worker, also arguing that the migrant worker is subject to equality and protection. This agreement has yet to be signed by many nations in Southeast Asia but there are a few that have signed and ratified the agreement like Indonesia and the Philippines and Cambodia which is yet to ratify.

Anti-Trafficking in Persons Act are laws passed by many countries in Southeast Asia to prevent traffickers from using abduction, fraud, deception, abuse of power and giving or receiving money to obtain consent from the individual for control over them as a means for the recruitment, transportation, harboring of individuals by means of force or threats, sale, lending and hiring of an individual with or without their consent. Countries such as Thailand, Myanmar, Malaysia, Philippines, Cambodia and Indonesia all have their own Anti-Trafficking in Person Acts that are used to prevent human trafficking and prosecute those who violate this act.
