= Luis Ángel Arango Library =

Public library in Bogotá, Colombia

Coordinates: 4°35′50″N 74°04′22″W

Luis Angel Arango Library

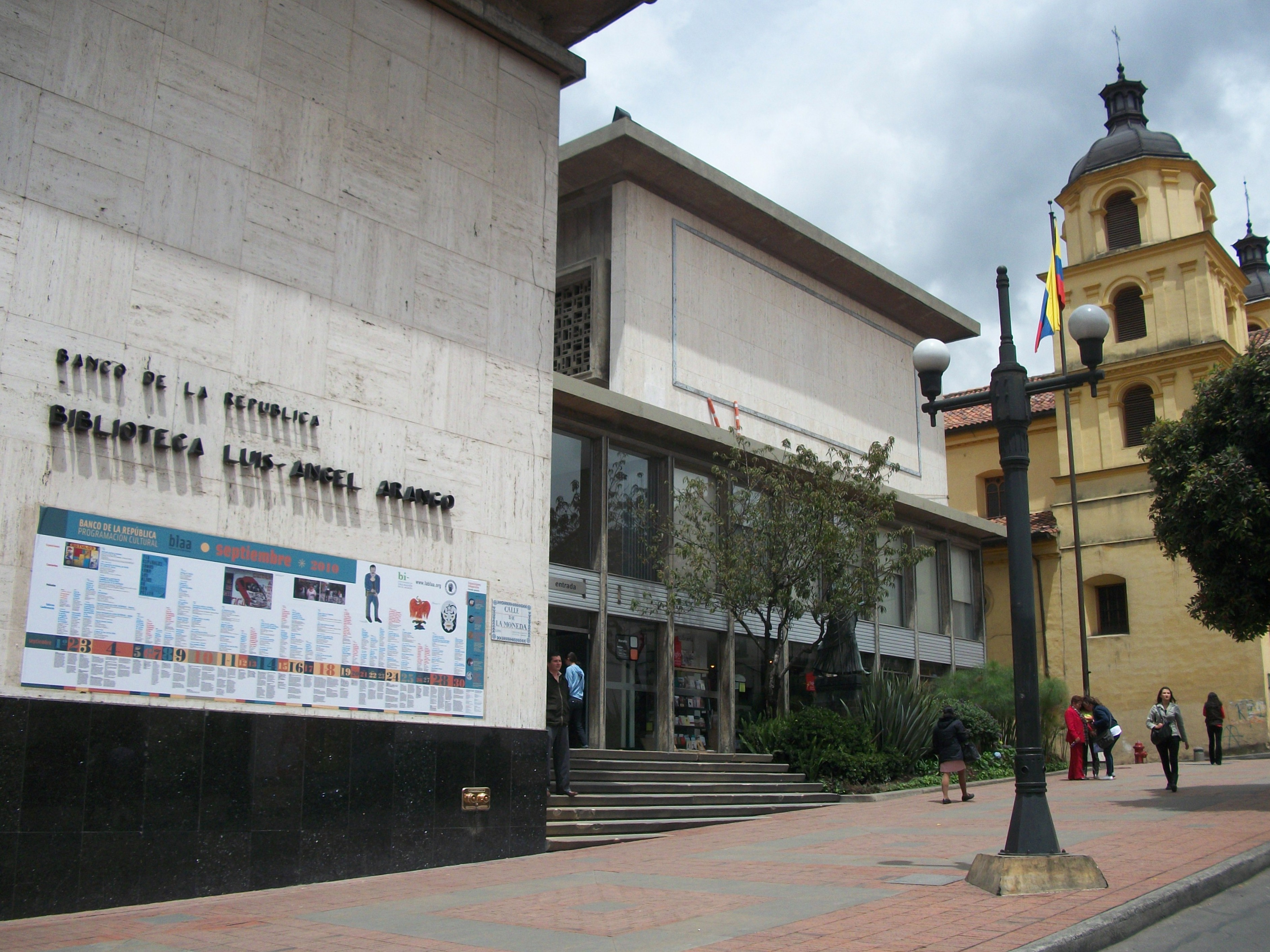
- Building on Bogotá's Cultural district
- Location: Bogotá
- Established: 1958

Collection
- Size: 1.5 million items (2,500,000 in the Network of Libraries of the "Banco de la República")

Access and use
- Circulation: This library circulates to the public with a subscription.

Other information
- Director: Alberto Abello Vives
- Employees: 500 approx.
- Website: www.banrepcultural.org/blaa

Luis Ángel Arango Library (Biblioteca Luis Ángel Arango or BLAA) is a public library located in Bogotá, Colombia. It is one of the largest and most important libraries in the world. It was founded in 1958 as a small library with a few books on economics, currently its collection has about 2.000.000 works. Today the library has been expanded and occupies two entire city blocks spanning about 45,000 m^{2} (nearly 54,000 sq. yards). Its collection has grown to become the country's premier library and has come to be considered the most important public library in Latin America, and one of the most visited in the world. It has over 1.1 million books and seating for 1900 readers; it received 6.7 million visitors in 2008. The library is named after the lawyer and businessman Luis Angel Arango, the general director (Governor) of the "Banco de la Republica" in Colombia from 1947 to 1957, and a champion of culture and literature for all. The library is part of the cultural affairs wing of Colombian Central Bank (Banco de la República), Banrepcultural network, which today runs 23 additional libraries, cultural centers and museums across Colombia.

Notable Books and documents of its collection include, multimedia documentary materials of the Colombian Constitution, rare books and manuscripts purchased from private collections from around the world, as well as the Luis López de Mesa periodicals archive (Hemeroteca) which is an extensive newspaper archive collection. The Library also offers a collection of audio-visual materials. Additionally, there is a Concert Hall, art exhibits, reprography service, a cafeteria and parking facilities. It centralizes the "digital collection" and the "Virtual Library" (Biblioteca Virtual del Banco de la República) a growing repository of digitized content from the network of libraries of the Banco de la República. The Botero Museum is housed in one of the contiguous buildings purchased for the expansion of the library. The main entrance features a bronze statue of Athena or Minerva, Greek goddess of wisdom, the arts, trade and defense.

There is also a bookstore in the first floor of the library. The bookstore specializes in books about Colombia, scientific magazines, and literature related to Colombia and its values.

== History ==
The first library of the bank, was established in 1932. It was located on the second floor of the Pedro A. López building in the bank headquarters in the Avenida Jiménez. Its collection comprised documents on economic, legal and fiscal issues and issues pertaining the activity of the central bank, with the archives from the currency council of the Banco de la República.

The bank acquired several private libraries, objects and documents of historic and patrimonial value to the Colombian nation as well as receiving donated private collections. Consequently, the bank conditioned a room then with only 25 people seating capacity and limited viewing time (open then from 2:00pm to 4:30pm Monday through Friday) to the general public. In 1945 the bank purchases the largest collection to date the Laureano García Otiz personal library.

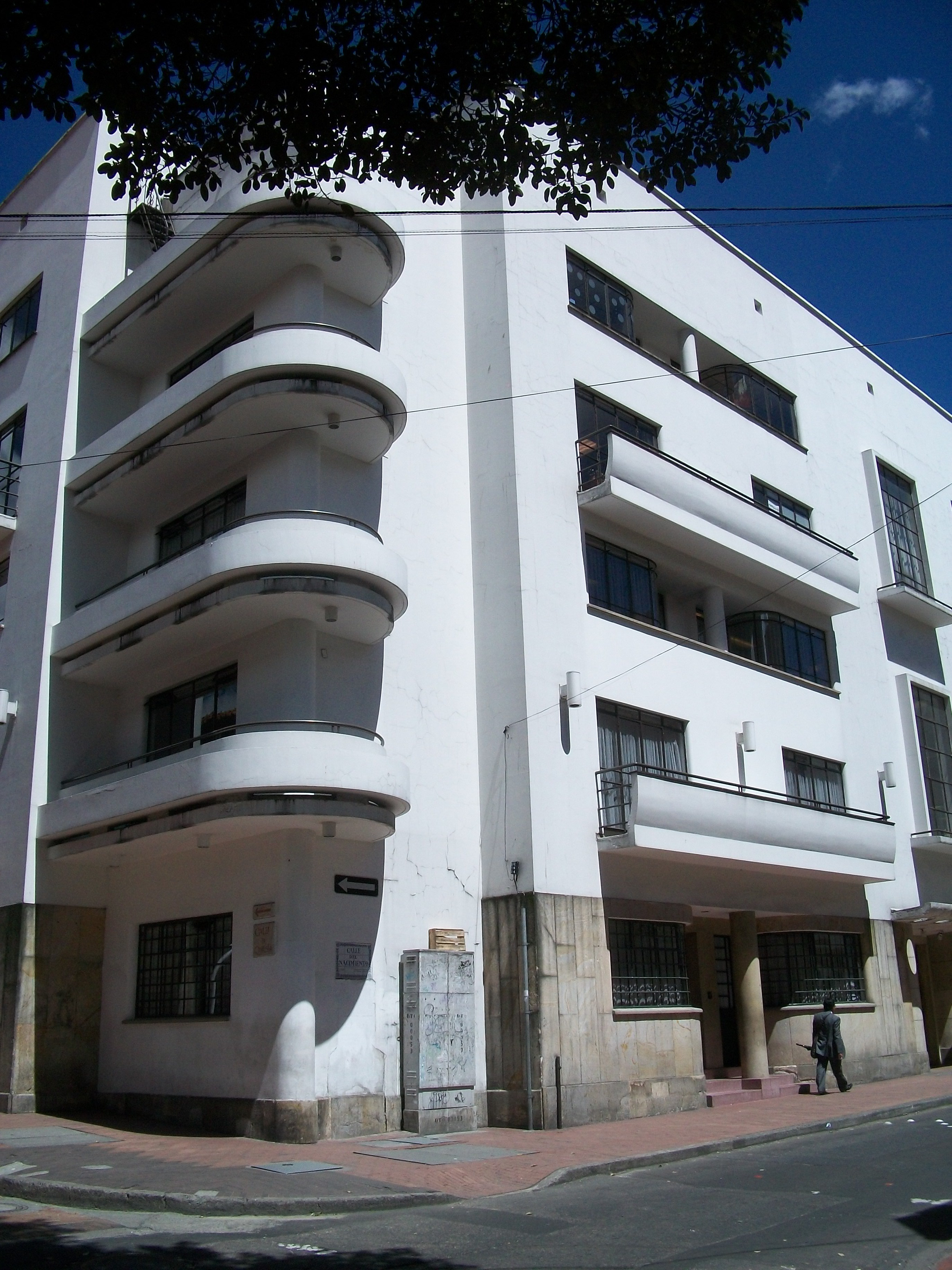
Facade of Vengoechea Building location of the administrative offices.

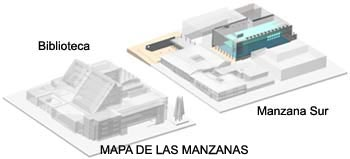
Two city blocks and several buildings comprise the cultural complex of which the Biblioteca Luis Ángel Arango Library is part. The graph shows the south and north block. Graph created by ElTiempo.com in April 2006.

After the bank moved its headquarters to a new building, General Director, Luis Ángel Arango, sought to relocate the library. The Old Mint House (Casa de la Moneda) was nearly destroyed in the Bogotazo riots and it was decided that the new expanded location of the library would be the remodeled and reconditioned building. The bank purchased the adjacent buildings to the Old Mint House and the block north from it. In all two entire city blocks (Manzana Sur y Manzana Norte), each were unified and communicated internally. For the new expanded building of the library the architect firm was Esguerra Saenz Urdaneta Samper in three separate expansions. Some of the buildings that make up the library are, The Vengoechea building, an art deco building (also described as "Arquitectura Racionalista") where administrative offices are located, the Republican House (Casa Republicana) which houses the Museum of Religious Art, the Colonial House (Old Mint House, Casa de la Moneda), the Old Bishop Palace (Palacio Arzobispal) now the Botero Museum of Pastiche architecture and the two modern sections. The first opened in 1958 when the new location opened, currently the main entrance and the Periodicals Archive (Hemeroteca) of "Modern Architecture" and the second of International architecture opening on May 5, 1990, in which the chamber music concert hall, the art gallery and the Musical Instruments Collection are located. Across the street, the Miguel Urrutia Museum of Art (MAMU).

=== Computerization ===
In 1983 Cultural Vice-director Jaime Duarte French, promoter of many of the cultural enterprises of the Bank retired while a major overhaul of the library was under study. He was succeeded by Lina Espitaleta de Villegas. After approval of the project and years of construction the new sections of the library opened on May 5, 1990.

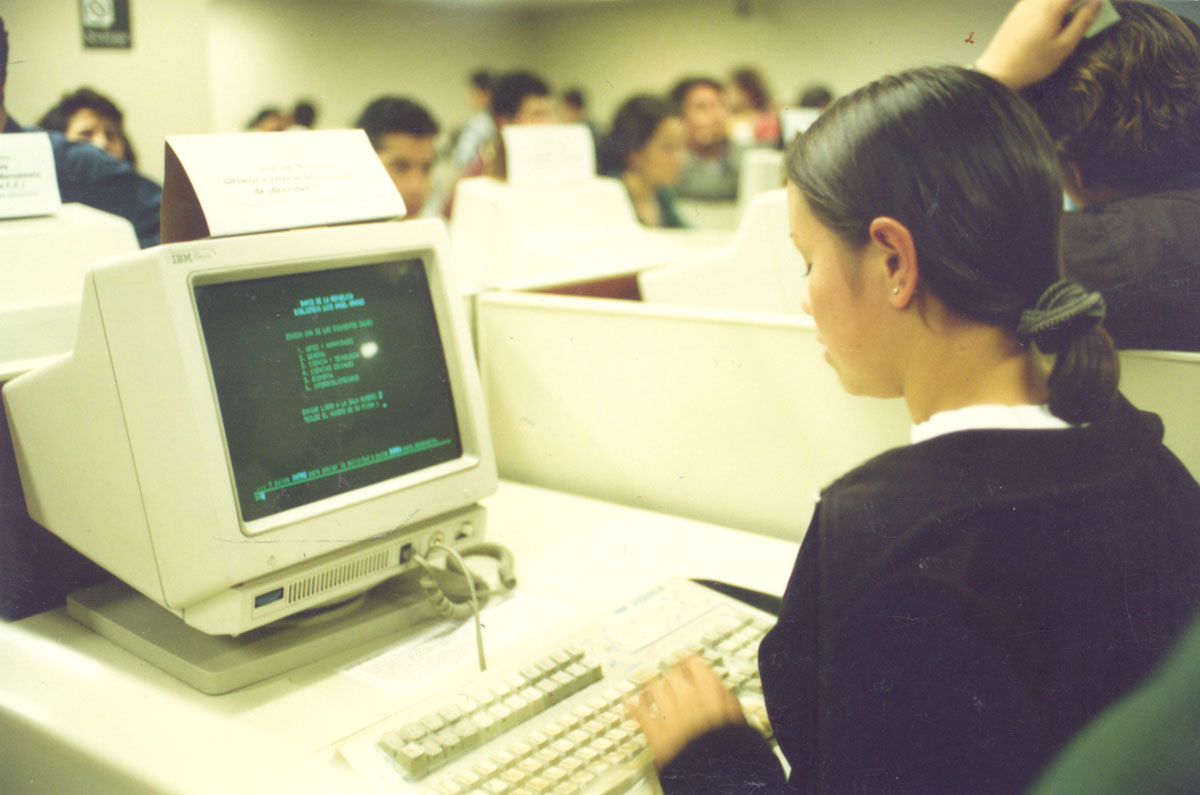
High school student using NOTIS Library Software in a Monochrome IBM workstation for reserves. Biblioteca Luis Ángel Arango, Bogota 1990s

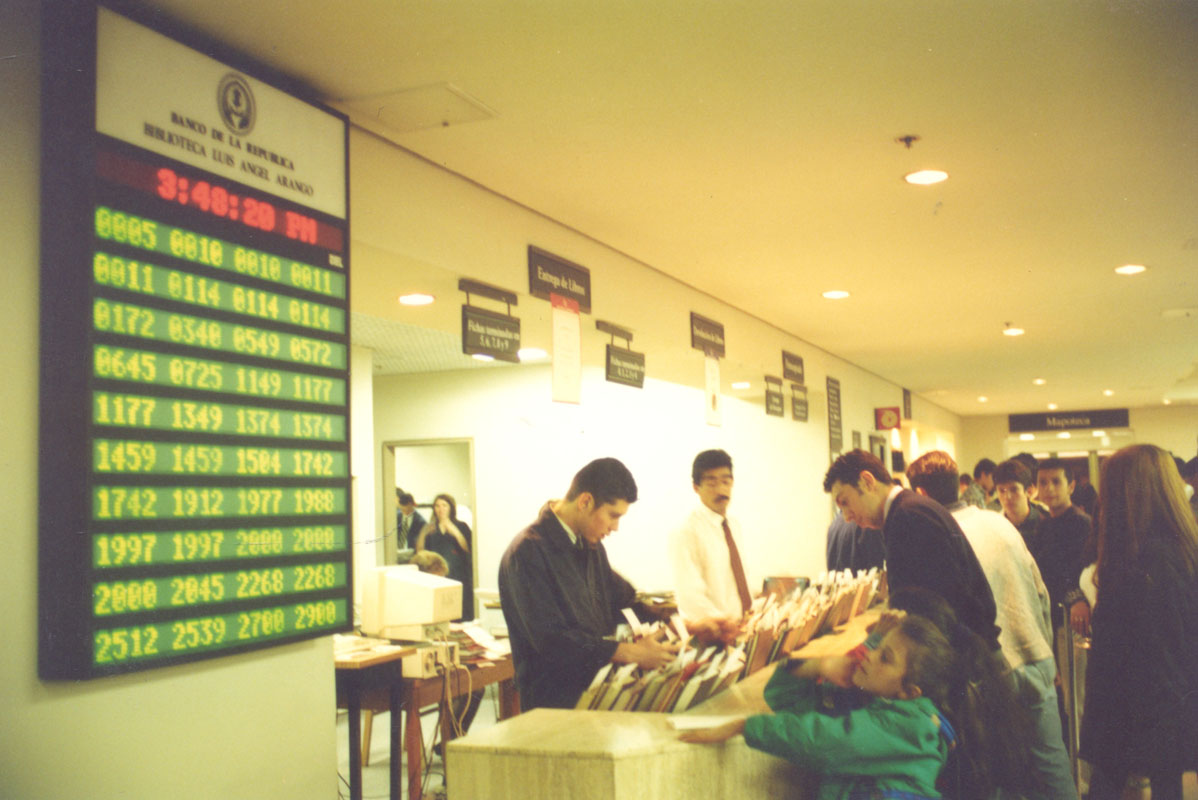
LED Electronic Board Displaying Reserves on Books from NOTIS Software in Biblioteca Luis Ángel Arango, Bogotá c. 1990s

Part of the overhaul included the systematization of requests and circulation. For that purpose, the then state-of-the-art system, NOTIS was purchased in 1986. In 1990 the NOTIS database handled 200,000 entries and by its retirement in 1998 had about 780,000 and included bibliographical inventory of several databases of other local and national institutions.

By the mid 90s, the library begun to offer access to remote databases like Juriscol (about Colombian jurisprudence) and other specialized databases, CD-ROM, and Internet. Since 1995 under the direction of Jorge Orlando Melo, there was an increased interest in the acquisition of new collections, the use of Internet for academic research and the creation of the Virtual Library with special interest in compiling and digitizing entire entries of the Colombian cultural heritage. By 2007 the system migrated to the system AbsysNet for easier and more effective national coverage of other nodes of the Banrepcultural network of libraries. Currently the Virtual Library has 80,000 texts, audio and video with 860 books, 4,700 magazine articles, 815 biographies and a considerable number of interactive pages for children and of art related topics.

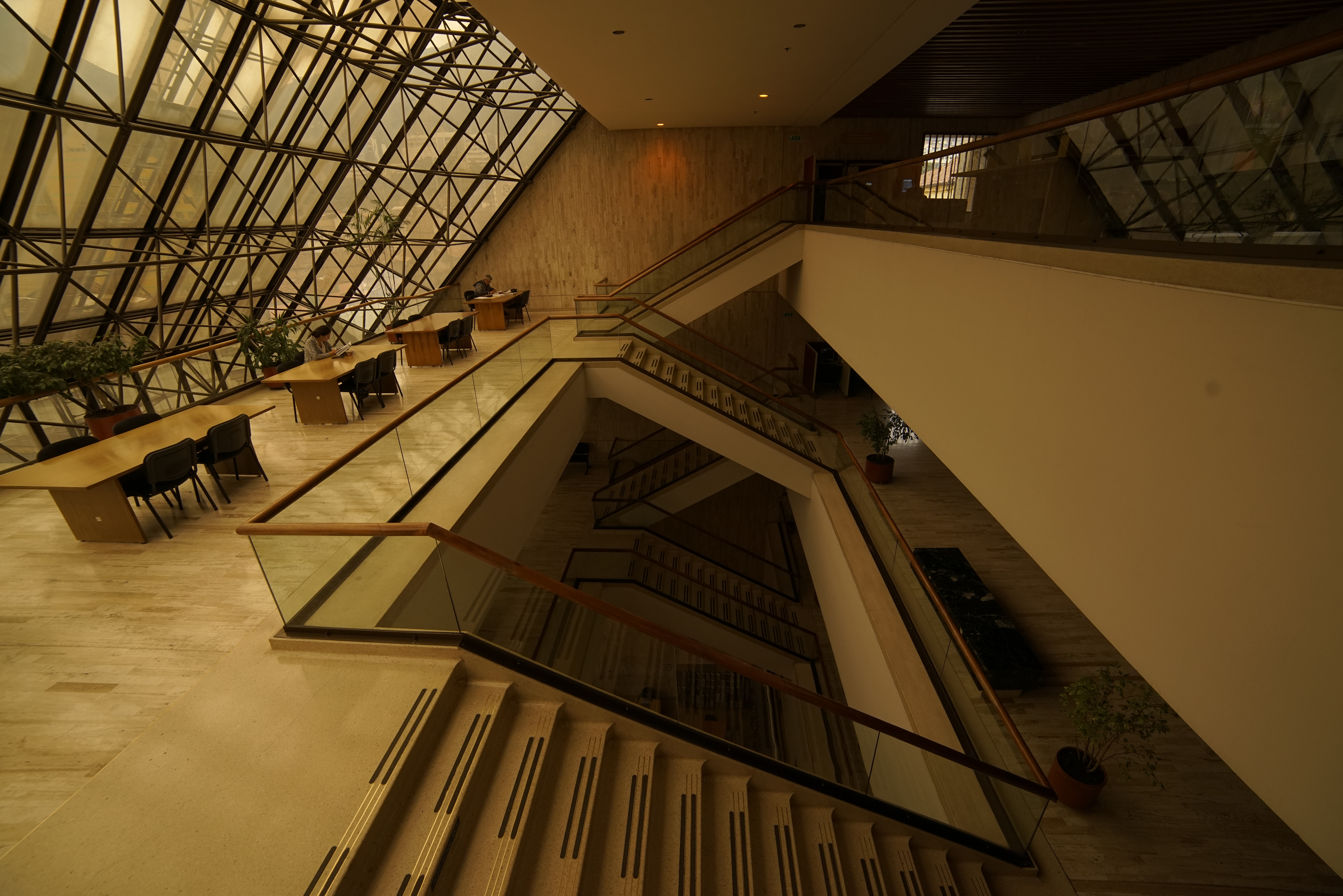
Internal Stairs

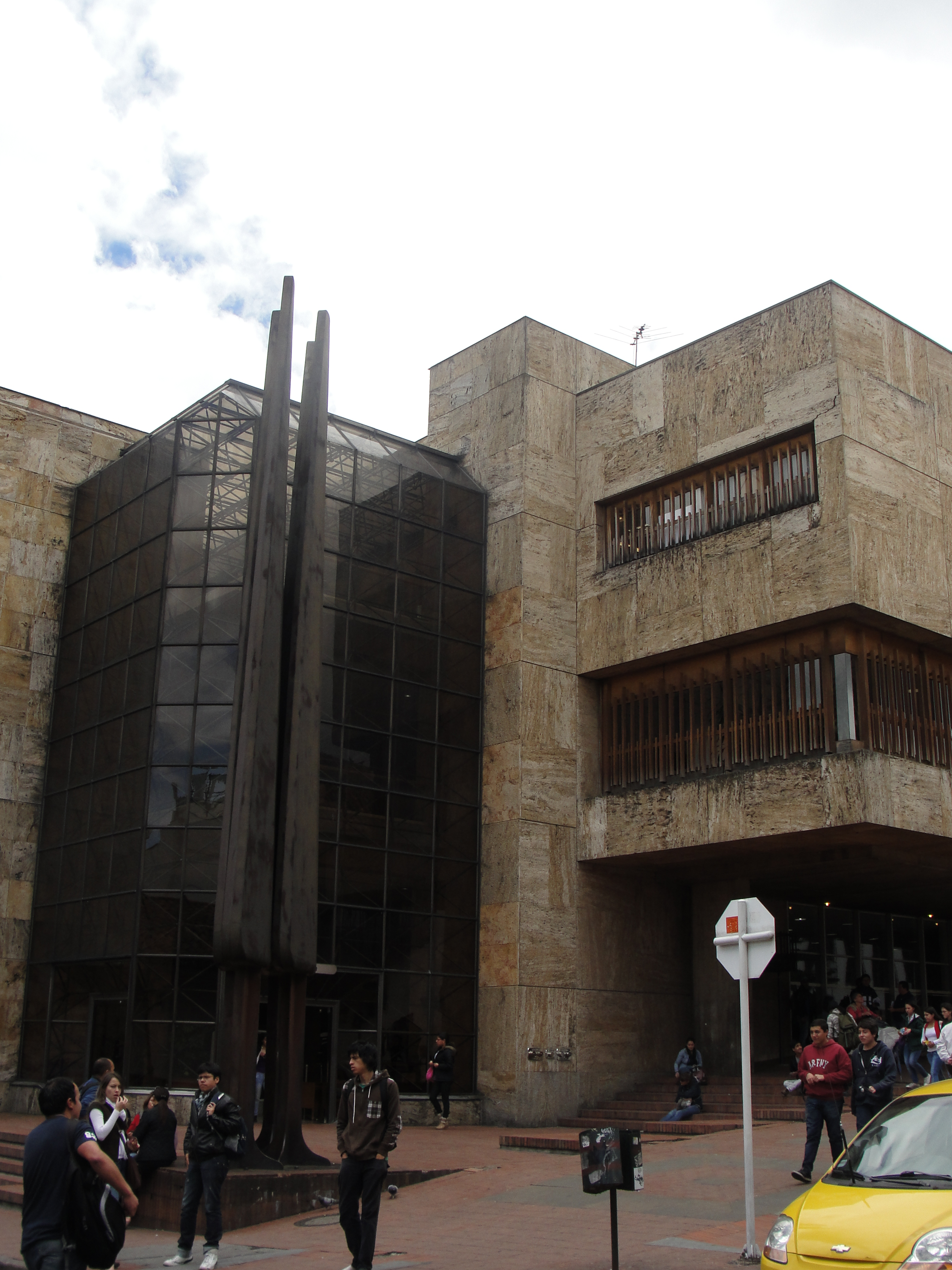
South West Entrance to the Concert Hall designed by Germán Samper

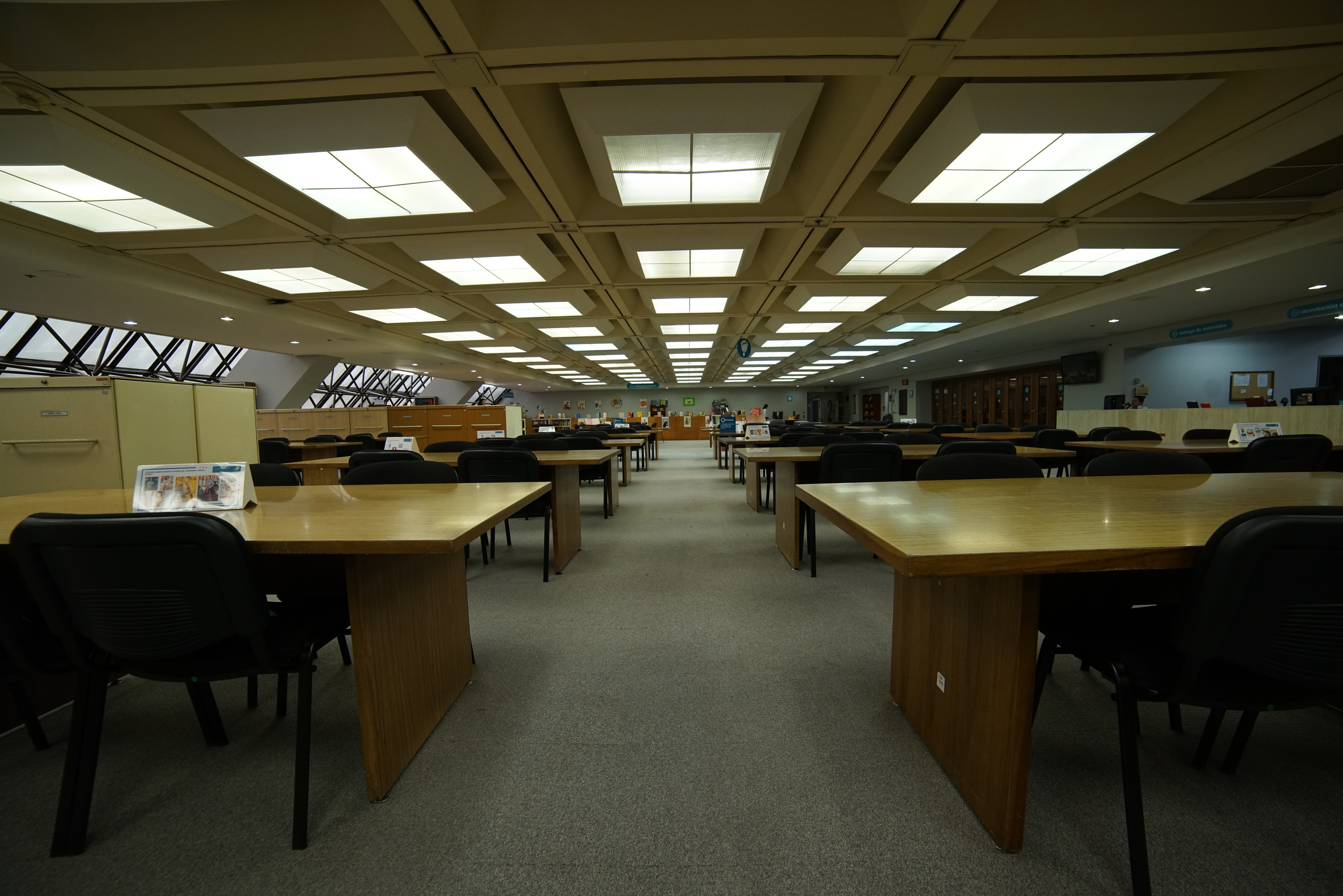
Pan-American Hall with tables

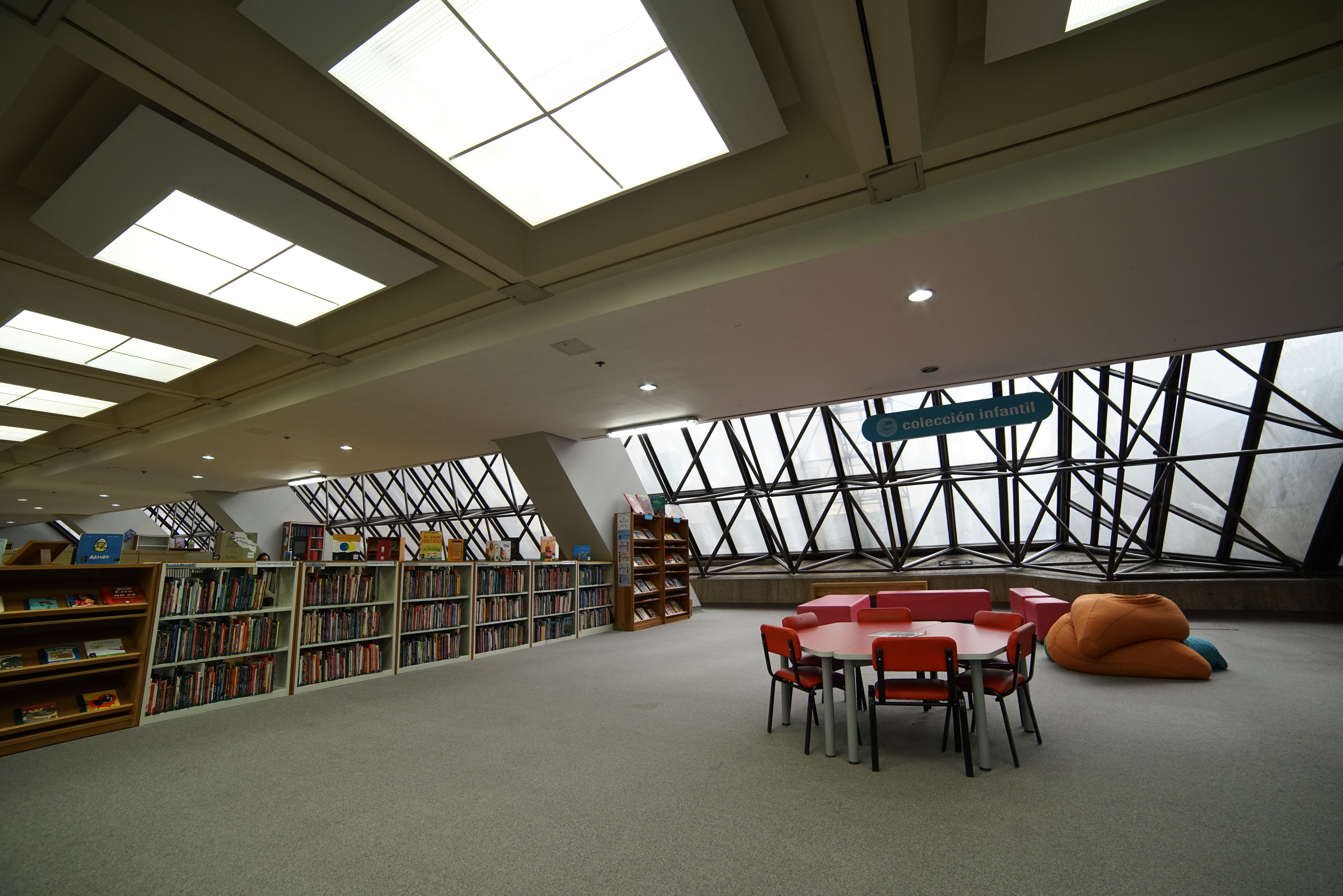
Reference floor

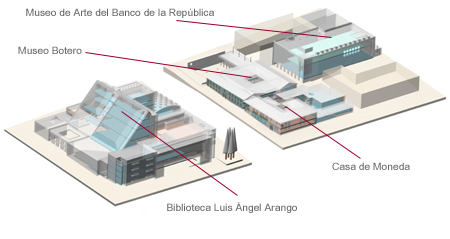
An entire city block houses the several buildings that comprise the Luis Angel Arango Library

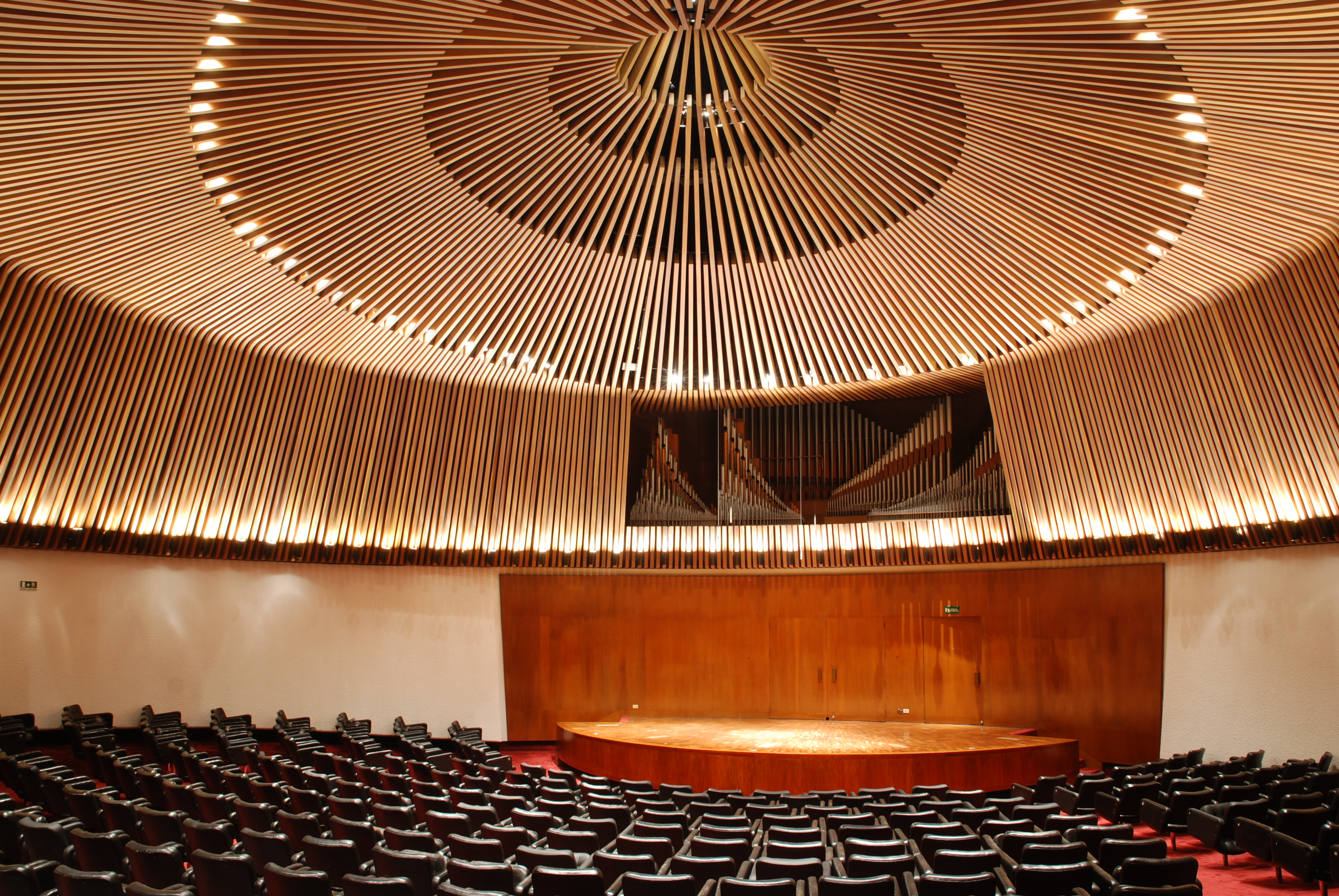
Concert Hall inside Biblioteca Luis Ángel Arango, designed by Germán Samper

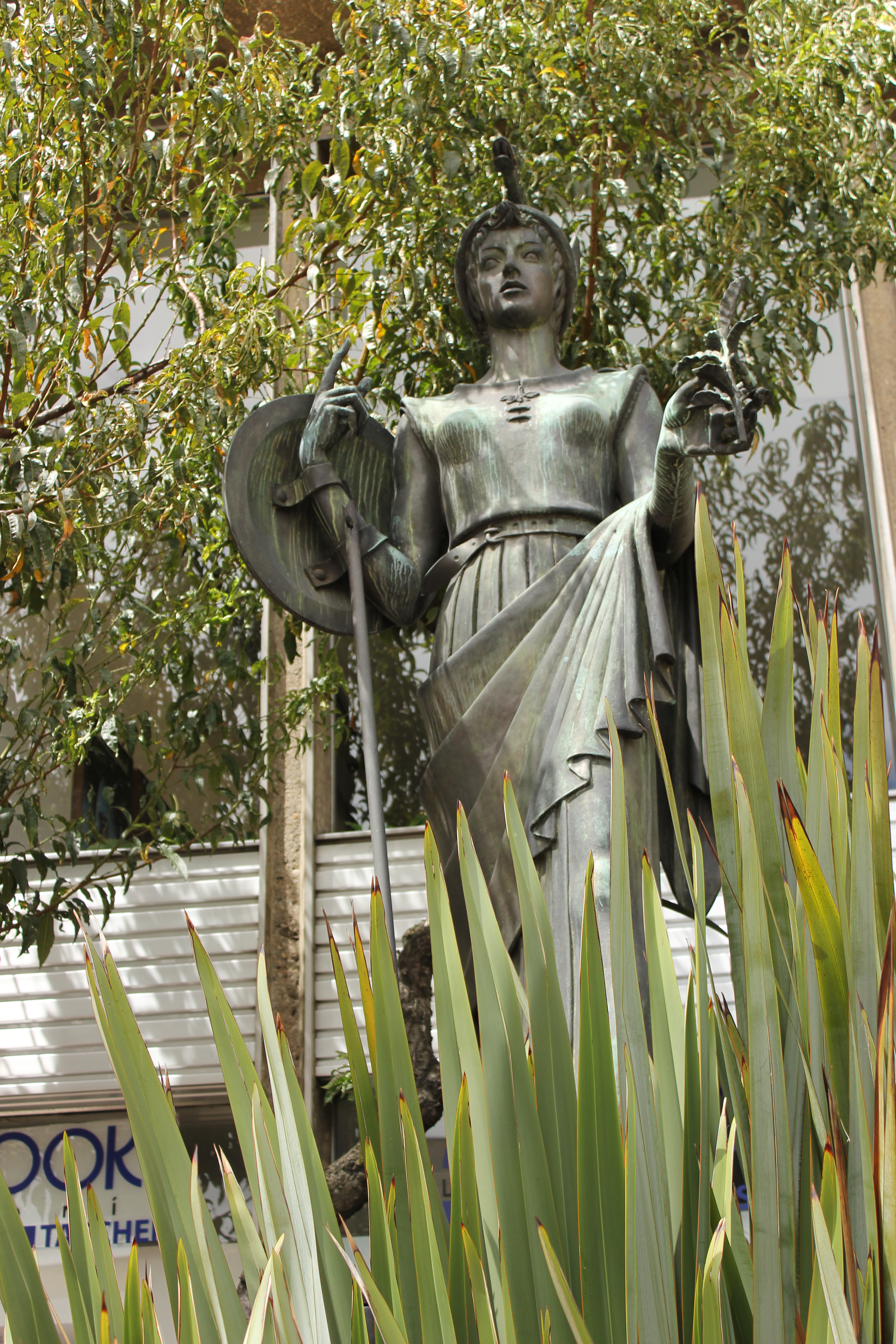
Minerva Statue, Main Entrance of the Biblioteca Luis Angel Arango

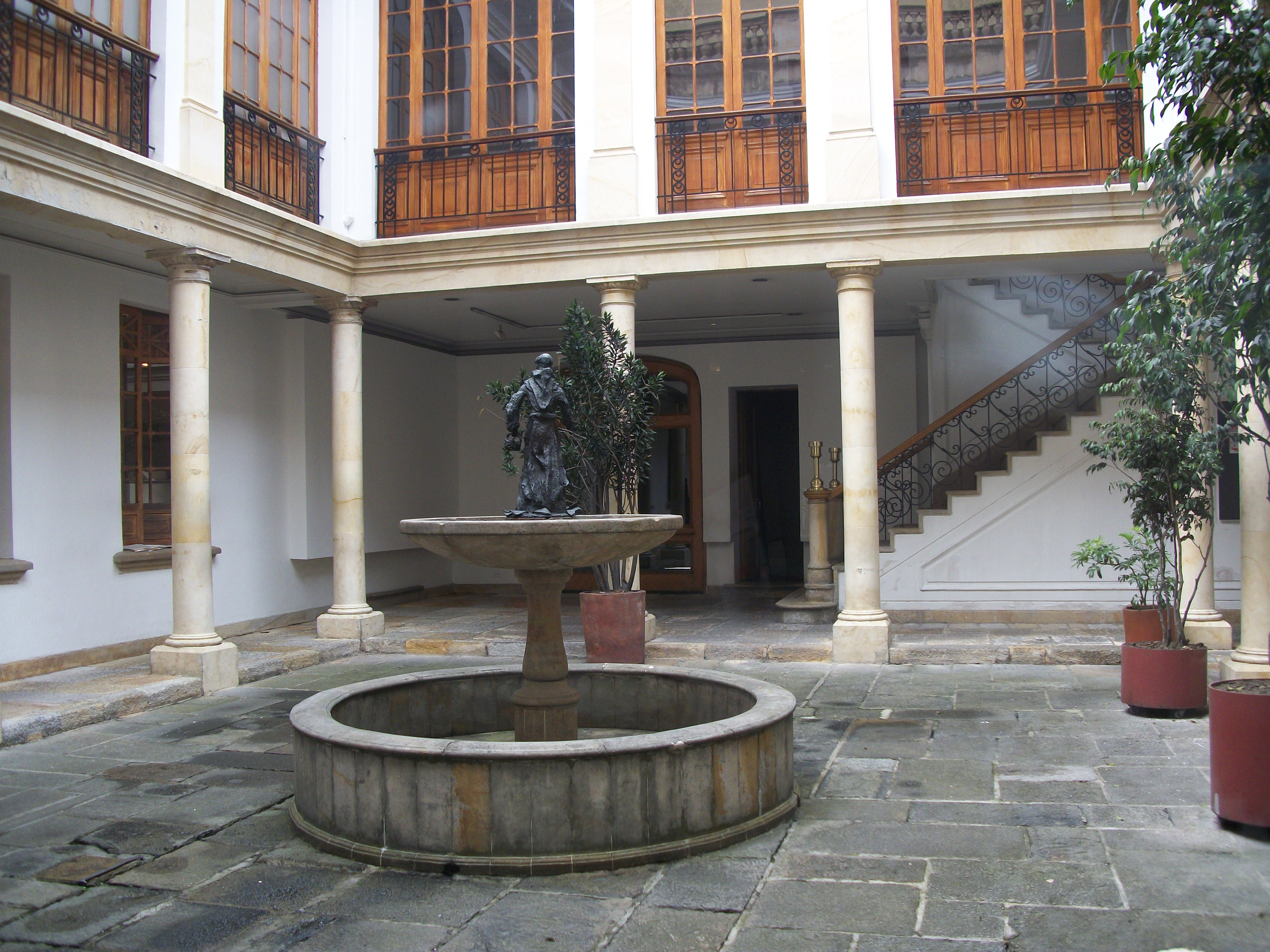
Inside view of Republican House, a building inside the Biblioteca Luis Angel Arango

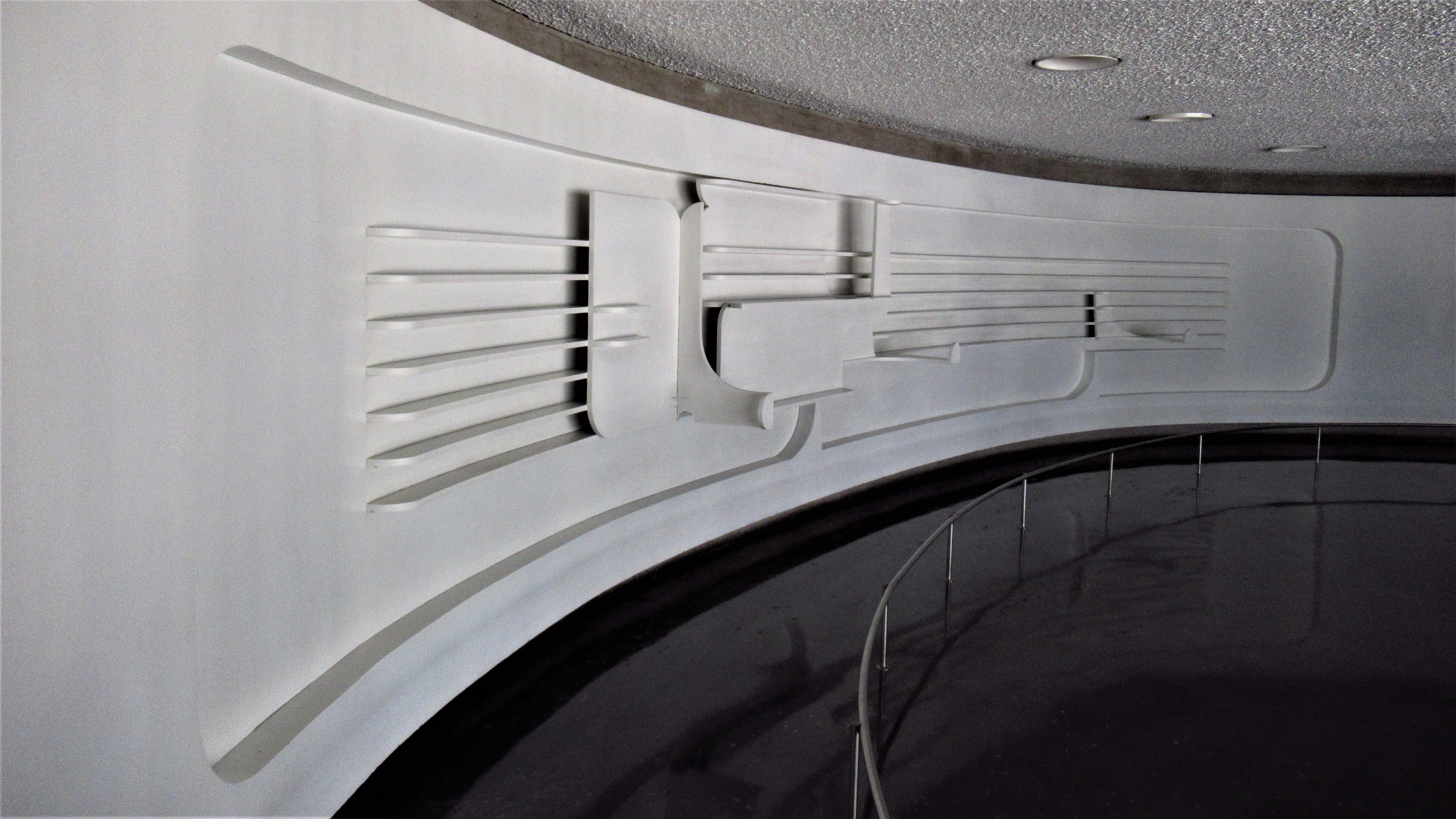
Internal High Relief Mural by Eduardo Ramírez Villamizar in the Biblioteca Luis Angel Arango

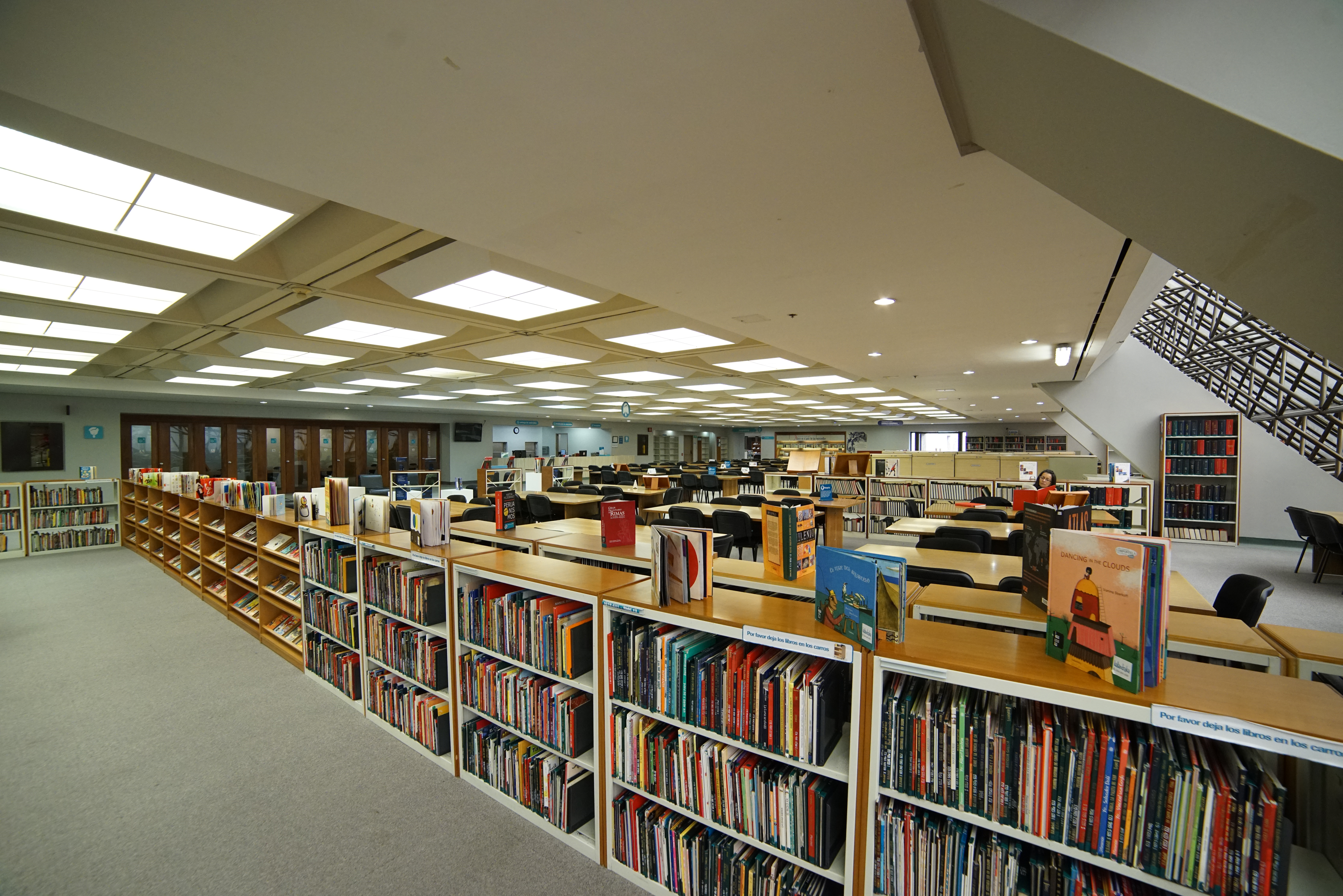
Reference floor of the Library, Biblioteca Luis Angel Arango

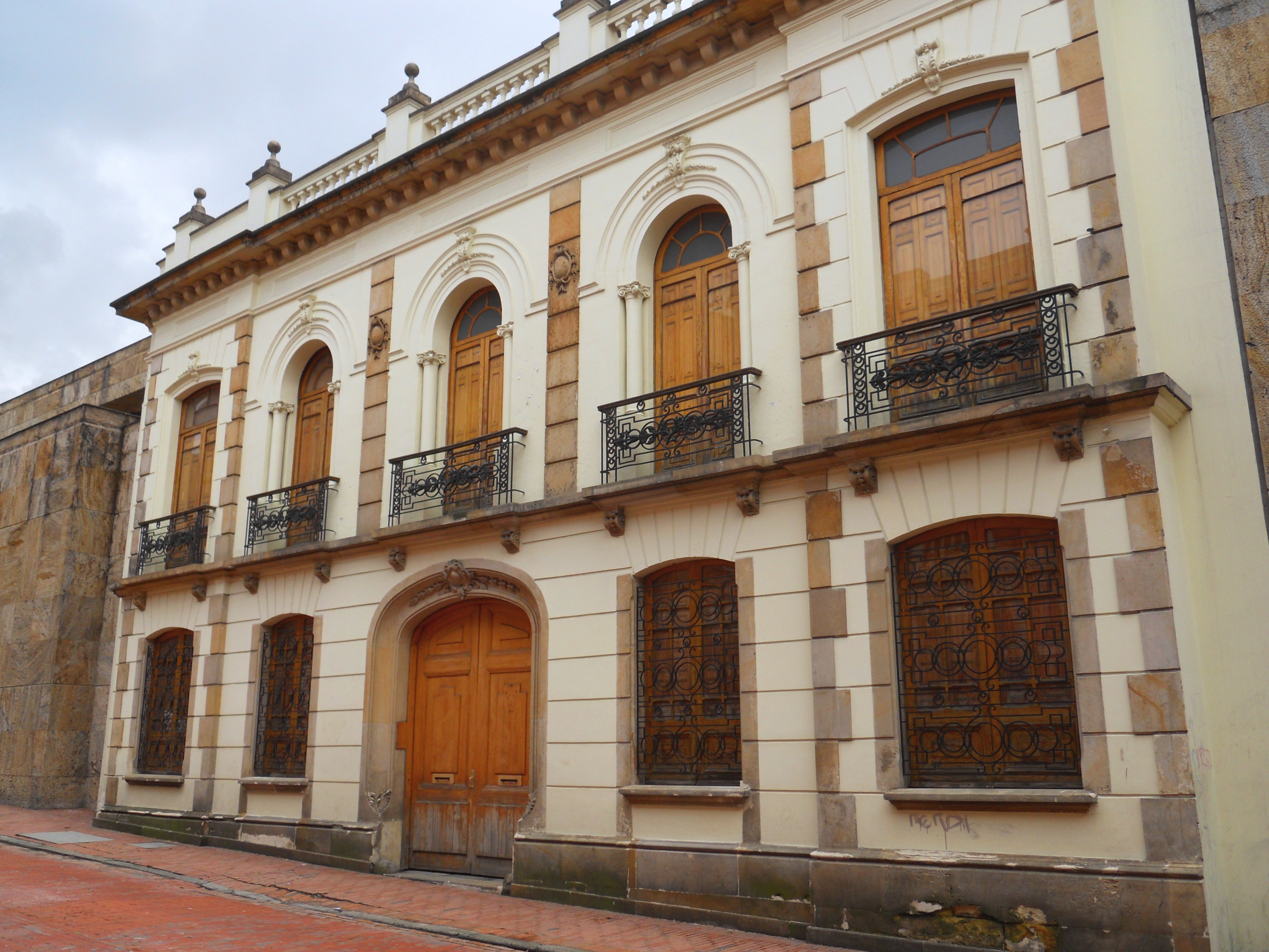
Street view of Republican House, a building inside the Biblioteca Luis Angel Arango

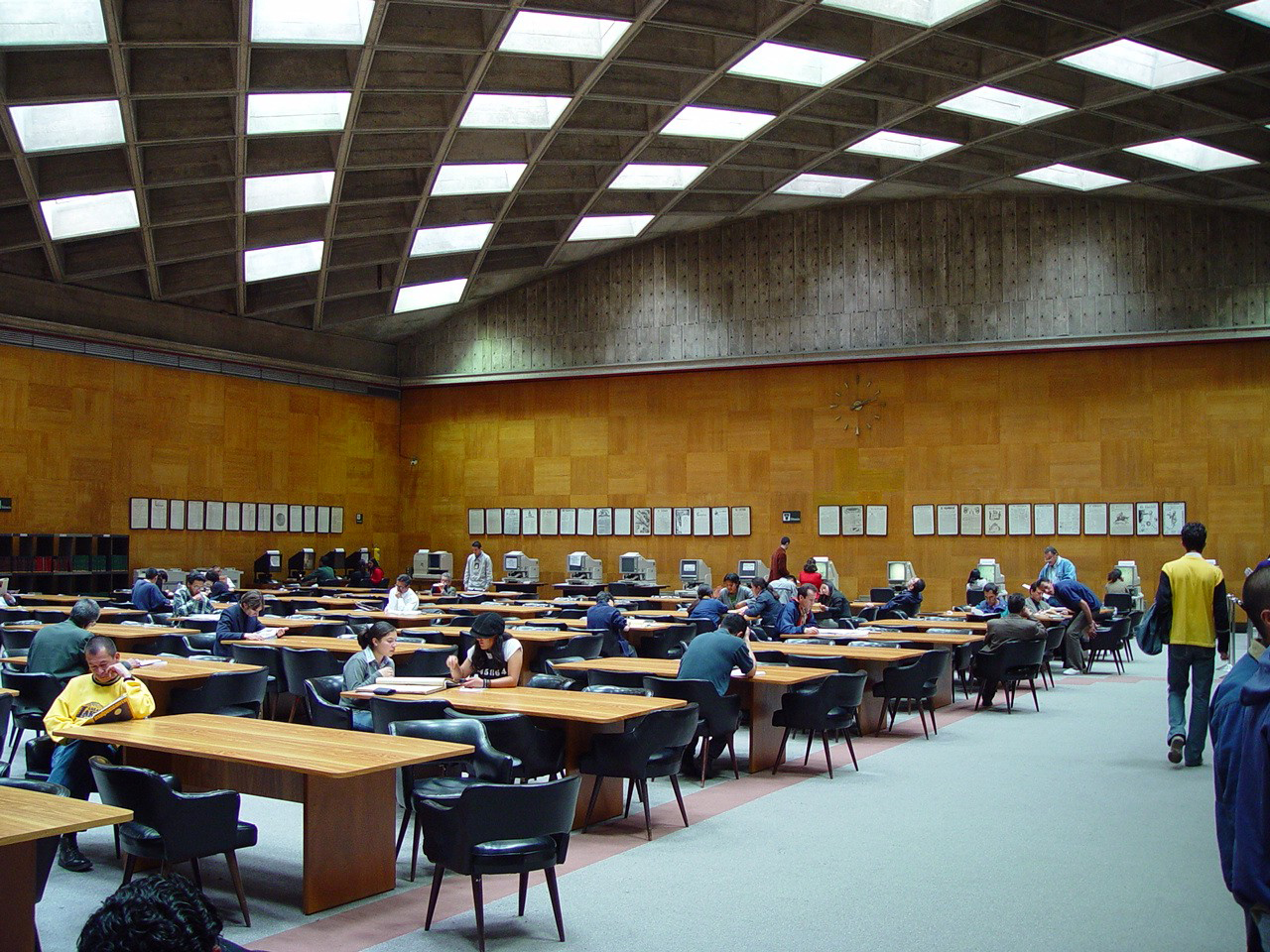
Periodicals Archive Hall of the Luis Ángel Arango Library designed by Rafaél Esguerra García

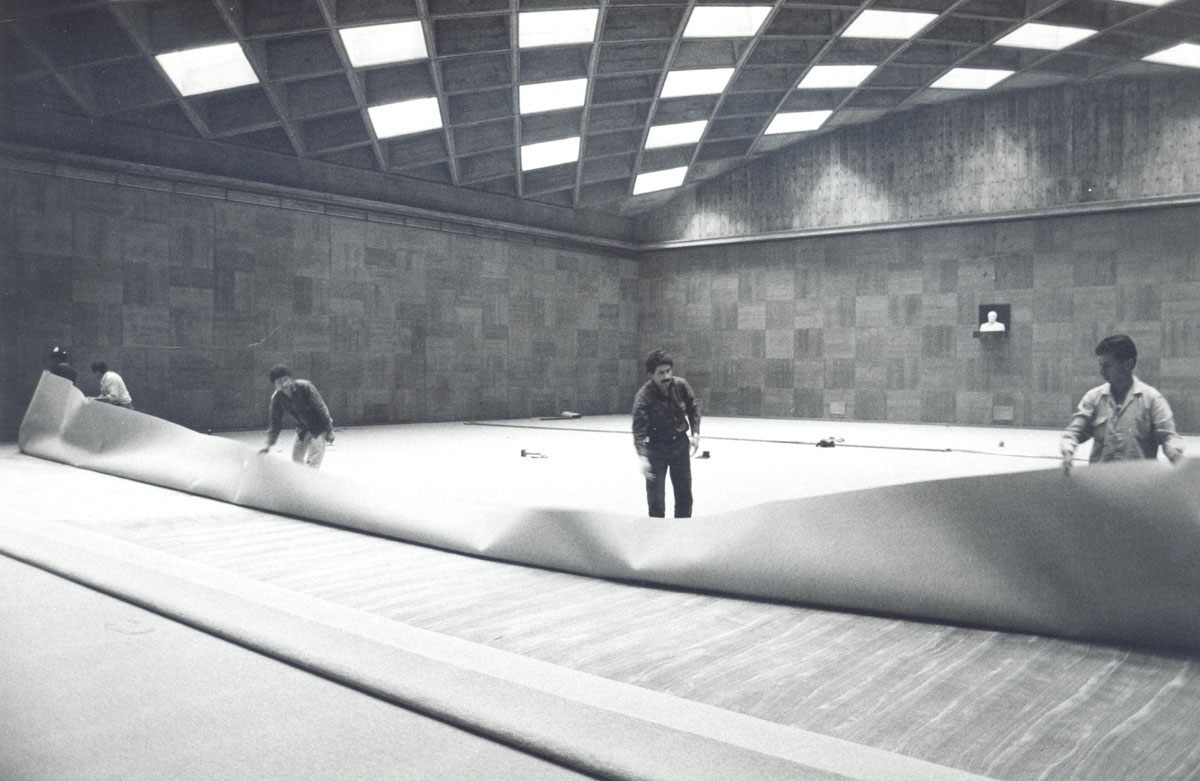
Luis López de Mesa Reading Hall, Periodicals Archive (Hemeroteca) with concrete dome and skylights designed by Rafaél Esguerra García. Biblioteca Luis Ángel Arango, Bogotá, c. 1957

== See also ==
- Casa Gómez Campuzano
- List of libraries in Colombia
