= SirsiDynix =

Software company

- Type: Private
- Industry: Software
- Headquarters: Lehi, Utah, United States
- Area served: Worldwide
- Key people: Mike Nehren, Executive Vice President
- Products: Integrated library systems
- Parent: Harris Computer, Constellation Software
- Website: www.sirsidynix.com

SirsiDynix is a United States company that produces integrated library system (ILS) software and associated services for libraries.

== Origins ==
The Sirsi Corporation was founded in Huntsville, Alabama in 1979 by Mike Murdock, Jacky Young, and Jim Young. The Unicorn library automation system they developed was first installed at Georgia Tech. Sirsi acquired Data Research Associates (DRA) for $51.5 million in 2001.

The Dynix Corporation was founded in 1983. Their major product was the Dynix Automated Library System. In January 1992, Dynix Systems was acquired by Ameritech. Dynix and NOTIS Systems (maker of NOTIS), which Ameritech purchased in October 1991, were consolidated into Ameritech Library Services (ALS) in 1994. In November 1999, Ameritech sold Ameritech Library Systems to a pair of investment companies, the 21st Century Group and Green Leaf Ridge Company, which rebranded ALS as epixtech. In 2003, epixtech reverted to using the Dynix name.

== History ==
SirsiDynix was formed by the merger of the Dynix Corporation and the Sirsi Corporation in June 2005. The company is based in Lehi, Utah, and employs approximately 400 in offices worldwide.

It was bought out by Vista Equity Partners in December 2006, a private equity firm based in San Francisco, California.

SirsiDynix and Stanford University libraries worked together for over a year to upgrade Stanford's library environment to support Asian and other multi-byte character sets. SirsiDynix has also partnered with 3M to provide radio-frequency identification systems for libraries.

On October 29, 2009, the WikiLeaks Project obtained a document from SirsiDynix taking a negative view of open-source projects as compared to proprietary products, including risks of instability and insecurity. The document, which its author, Stephen Abrams, claimed was not intended to be secret, set off a debate on open source within the library technology community.

In May 2010, the company performed an upgrade of its systems at the Ottawa Public Library, involving a scheduled two-day closure of all library branches, accompanied by an 11-day shutdown of online systems. However, the actual upgrade required closure of the library system for an additional two days. Jan Harder, chair of Ottawa's library board, stated an intention to seek compensation from SirsiDynix for the unexpected additional upgrade work.

Bill Davison was named SirsiDynix CEO in October 2011.

In January 2015 ICV Partners announced their acquisition of SirsiDynix from Vista Equity Partners.

As of 2020, SirsiDynix was competing in both the academic library realm and in the public library space, where its Symphony product was very popular and its older Horizon ILS saw a decline in implementations from 2010 to 2020.

On December 24, 2024, SirsiDynix was acquired by Harris Computer, a subsidiary of Constellation Software based in Toronto, Canada. Unlike ICV Partners, who owned SirsiDynix previously, Constellation is a Vertical market software company that employs a “buy and hold” model, acquiring businesses and holding them in perpetuity.

== Products ==
Integrated library system software supports various library functions: cataloging, circulation, acquisitions, reserves, outreach, etc. SirsiDynix currently supports two ILS products: Symphony (the successor of Unicorn) and Horizon.

BLUEcloud LSP

SirsiDynix announced the BLUEcloud Library Services Platform (LSP) at the annual users group conference, COSUGI. It is a browser-based system that will integrate SirsiDynix's "administration, discovery, acquisition, and collection management applications." It can be accessed from a desktop, laptop, tablet or smart phone. BLUEcloud can integrate with both SaaS and locally hosted Horizon and Symphony systems. The BLUEcloud LSP is made up of three major components: BLUEcloud Staff, BLUEcloud Marketplace, and BLUEcloud Discovery. This approach will stop the duplication of data and will integrate all searches across products. The majority of the new features of BLUEcloud will be included in the annual maintenance fee.

Other

Other products include Director's Station and Web Reporter.

Previous products include Unicorn, DialCat and SchoolRooms.
