= Esguerra =

Esguerra is a surname. It is a Castilianized form of the Basque word "Ezkerra", meaning "left-handed". Notable people with the surname include:

- Domingo Esguerra Plata (1875–1965), Colombian lawyer and diplomat
- Juan Carlos Esguerra Portocarrero (born 1949), Colombian lawyer and politician
- Rafael Esguerra, Colombian architect
- [Manuel Esguerra], Diplomat, Colombia. Esguerra-Barcenas Treaty.
- [Jorge Esguerra], Politician, Colombia
- [Maria Angela Esguerra], Dr. Of Naturopathic Medicine, research on natural health related to multiple sclerosis and other chronic disease.
