= Casa Gómez Campuzano =

Art museum and library

- Main exhibition room
- Established: 1978; 48 years ago
- Location: Calle 80 #8-66; Bogotá
- Coordinates: 4°39′49″N 74°03′09″W
- Type: Art museum, library
- Website: www.banrepcultural.org/bogota/casa-gomez-campuzano

The Casa Gómez Campuzano (English: Gómez Campuzano House) is a single-artist museum and library annex located in the El Nogal neighborhood of Bogotá, Colombia.

The Gómez Campuzano House displays artwork by Colombian artist Ricardo Gómez Campuzano who was a renowned landscape and portrait painter.

The Casa Gómez Campuzano is part of the Banrepcultural Network along with the Museo Botero, the Miguel Urrutia Art Museum, the Gold Museum, and the Museo Casa de Moneda. As an annex of the Luis Ángel Arango Library, the house museum is also part of the Bank of the Republic's Library Network.

== History ==
In 1976, artist Ricardo Gómez Campuzano and his wife, Inés Delgado Padilla, established the Ricardo Gómez Campuzano Cultural Association with the purpose of promoting and establishing a permanent exhibition of Gómez Campuzano's artwork. Two years later, in 1978, the house where Ricardo Gómez Campuzano lived and worked opened to the public as a house museum for the purpose of fulfilling the association's mandate.

In 2000, the Bank of the Republic received in commodatum the entirety of the Gómez Campuzano collection and house. Since 2001, the bank's cultural administration has managed the Gómez Campuzano house which uses to display the Gómez Campuzano collection, and the once-private library of Alfonso Palacio Rudas.

On 26 July 2001, the Gómez Campuzano House was declared as an Asset of Cultural Interest by the Bogotá local government.

On 25 July 2014, the Gómez Campuzano House re-opened to the public with a new permanent exhibition titled Ricardo Gómez Campuzano: Visions of Nationalism in Colombian Art which displays a curated selection of 83 works by Gómez Campuzano divided into 5 different theme room displays.

On 8 September 2016, the Ricardo Gómez Campuzano Cultural Association officialized the donation of the entirety of the Gómez Campuzano collection, composed of 471 individual art pieces, the Gómez Campuzano House, and a grand piano to the Bank of the Republic.

Between 1 September 2025 and 30 March 2026, the Gómez Campuzano House underwent major maintenance work to guarantee the preservation of the premises' heritage characteristics. On 7 May 2026, the Gómez Campuzano House was re-opened to the public.

== Collection ==
The Gómez Campuzano collection is composed by 471 individual works of art, which are now part of the larger Bank of the Republic art collection. The collection encompasses paintings, drawings, and sketches made by Ricardo Gómez Campuzano through his artistic career. While the Gómez Campuzano House is used to display the collection, Gómez Campuzano's work is also displayed at the bank's other cultural centers including the Miguel Urrutia Art Museum as well as the bank's management offices.

The current exhibition, titled Ricardo Gómez Campuzano: Visions of Nationalism in Colombian Art displays a curated selection of 83 works by Gómez Campuzano. The exhibition is divided into 5 different theme room displays: From Bogotá to Spain, Landscape, Neo-costumbrism, Portrait, and the Artist's studio.

Some of the best known works of the collection include:

Neocostumbrism room with the Gómez Campuzano House

- Desolación (1907), oil on canvas, 112.5 x 205 cm
- Ganado en la Virginia (1912), oil on canvas, 37.3 x 49 cm
- Las ninfas perseguidas por los sátiros (1925), oil on canvas, 131 x 312.5 cm
- Aurora (1929), oil on canvas, 81.3 x 57.4 cm
- La hacienda (1930), oil on canvas, 191.5 x 280 cm
- La ventana (1942), oil on canvas, 104 x 123.7 cm
- Autorretrato (1948), oil on canvas, 107 x 84 cm
- Páramo de Sumapáz (1959), oil on canvas, 66.3 x 90.1 cm
- El mandado (1968), oil on canvas, 122.2 x 105 cm
- Barcas de Dénia (1969), oil on canvas, 66 x 90 cm

== Library annex ==
Since 2001, following the takeover of the Gómez Campuzano House by the Bank of the Republic, the venue has served as an annex of the Luis Ángel Arango Library (BLAA), often being referred to the North branch of the library in reference to the physical location within Bogotá.

As part of the BLAA, the Gómez Campuzano House provides public library services including access to wi-fi, study spaces, reading room, and access to the Bank of the Republic's library network and referencing capabilities.

=== Alfonso Palacio Rudas Collection ===
Alfonso Palacio Rudas was a renowned Colombian lawyer, economist, and celebrated political figure. Following his death, in 1996, the Luis Ángel Arango Library received his private library. The collection is composed by 41,457 bibliographical items mostly encompassing books related to the study of economics, political science, agricultural policy, law, and history.

In 2001, the Alfonso Palacio Rudas Collection was moved to the Gómez Campuzano house where it can be referenced by the general public.
