= Rafael Esguerra =

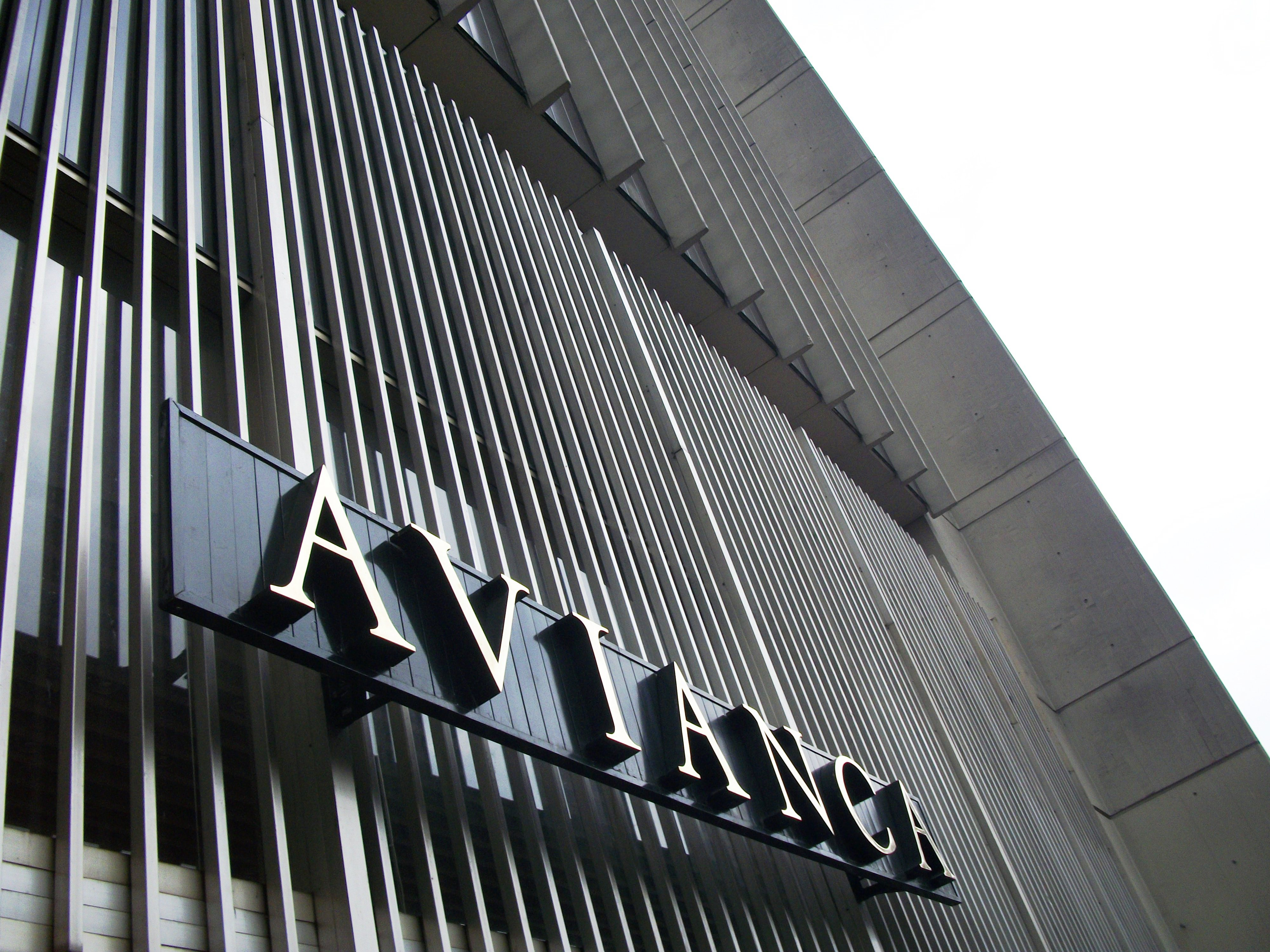
Accent in the metal structure of the facade of the Avianca Tower (c. 1968)

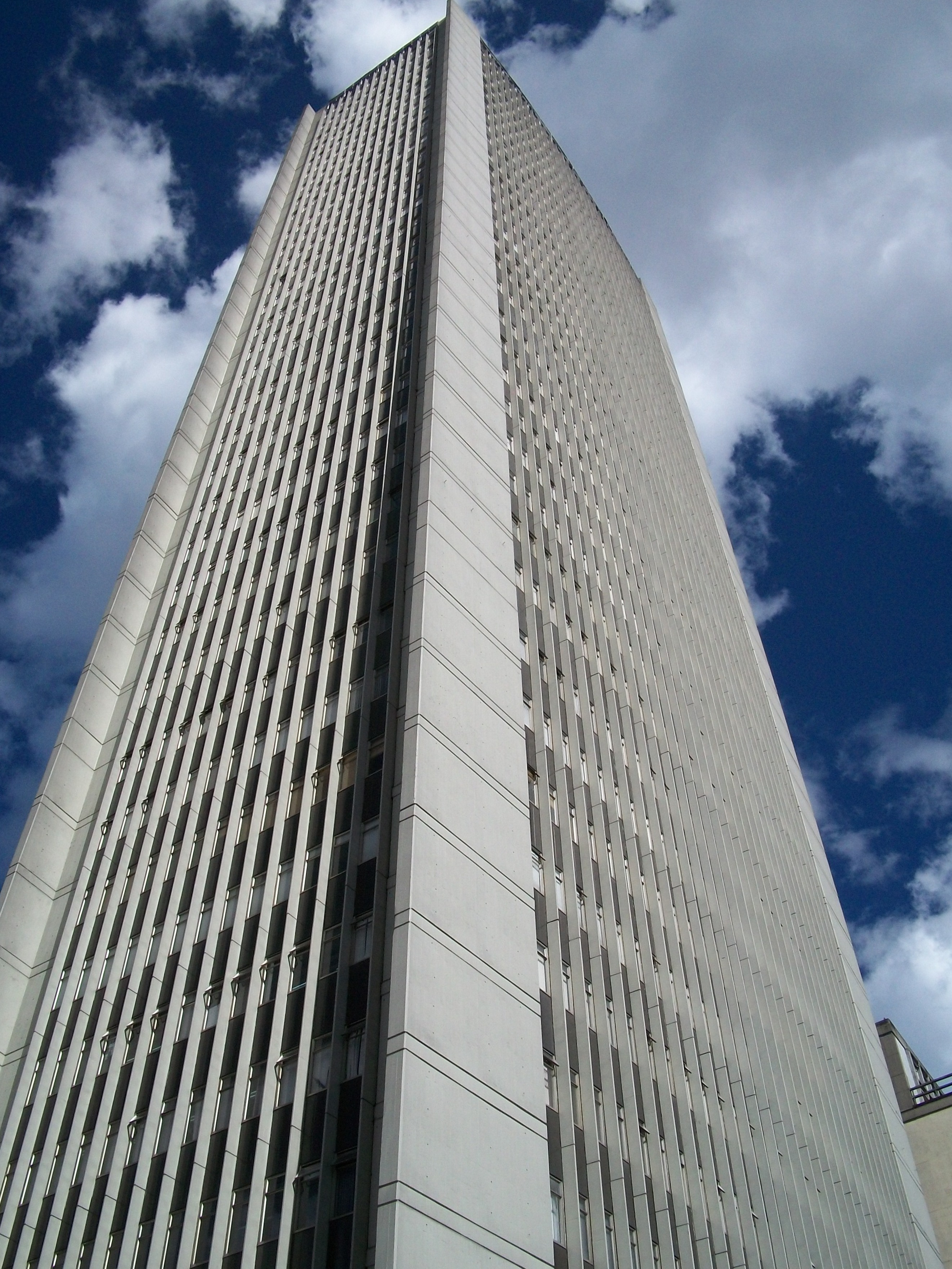
Southwest corner of the Avianca Tower, Bogotá (c. 1968)

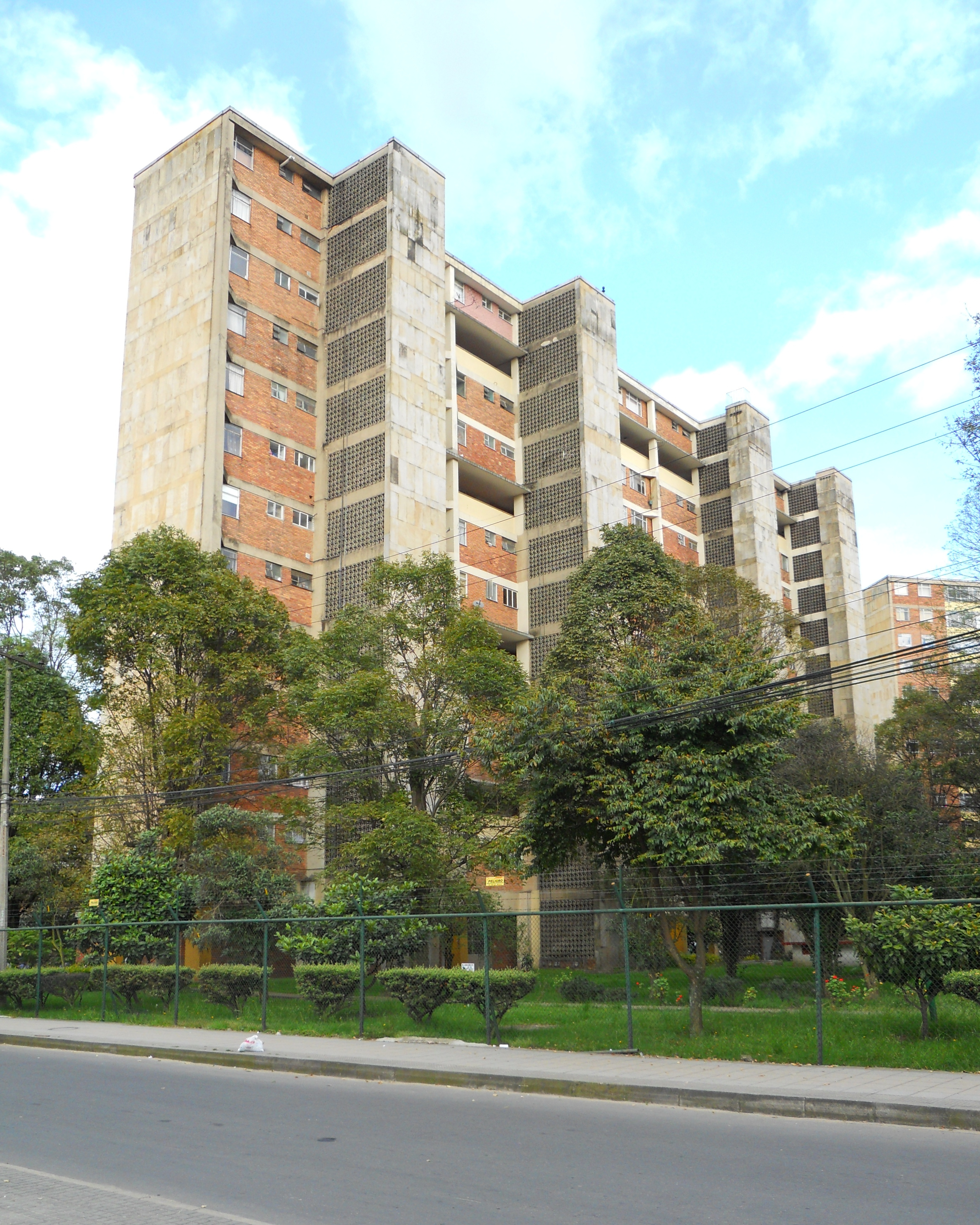
Inner view of Centro Antonio Nariño, Bogotá (c. 1952)

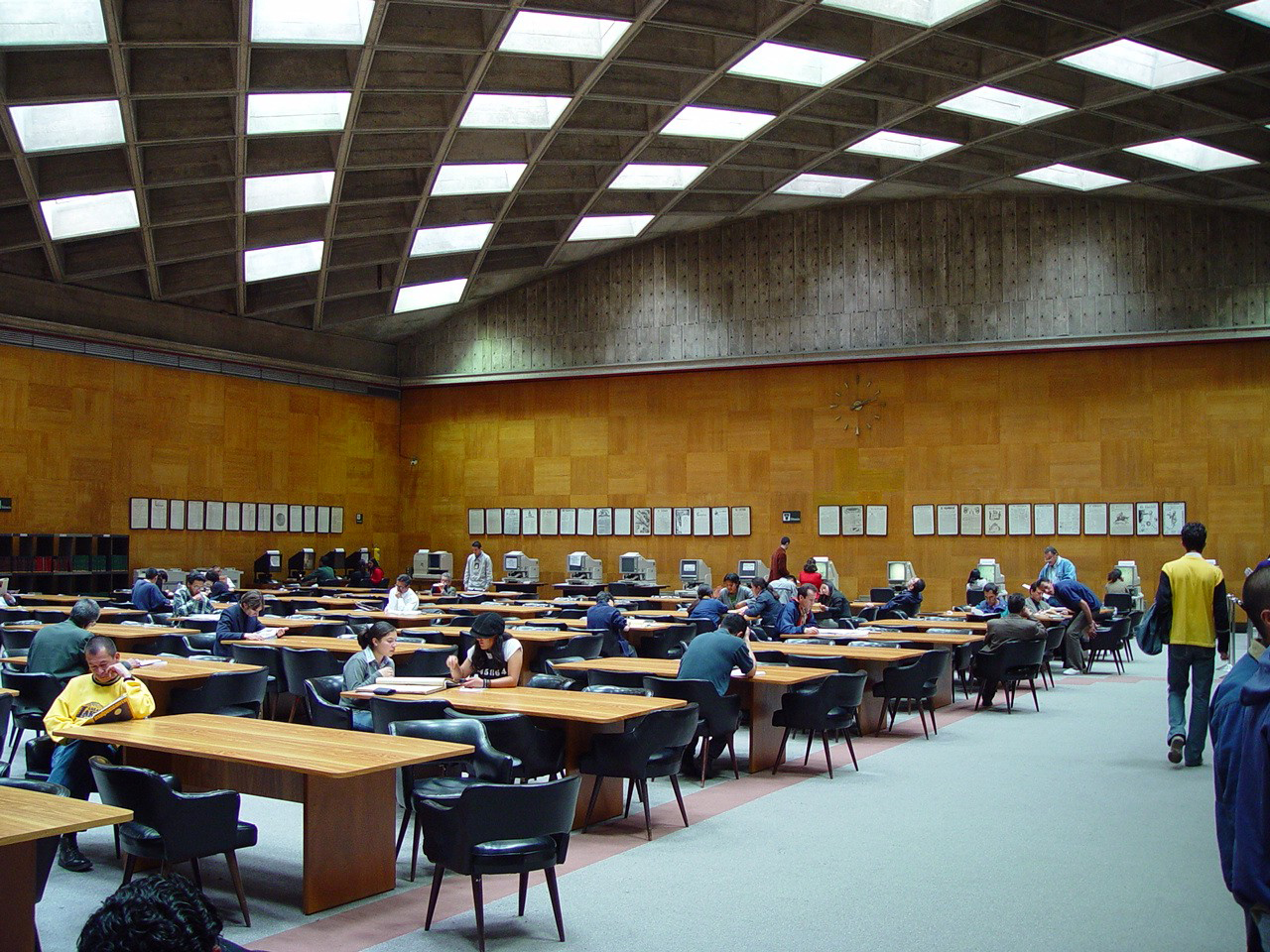
Periodicals Archive Hall of the Luis Ángel Arango Library designed by Rafael Esguerra García (c.1957)

Rafael Esguerra García (1922–2000) was the principal architect and co-founder of Colombian architecture firm Esguerra Saenz Urdaneta Samper (ESUS) in 1946. He graduated in 1945 from the National Colombian University (Universidad Nacional de Colombia) in Architecture and Civil Engineering. In ESUS he was in charge of the Structural department. He was also in the Board of subsidiary companies of ESUS such as Estruco & Cia. Ltda, a company specialized in concrete structures and civil engineering established in 1953. He partnered with engineer Doménico Parma and created the firm Ingeniería Mecánica Colombiana (IMC) in 1963 to design and produce heavy machinery for building processes, structural cabling and post-tensioning technologies. His work includes Avianca headquarters Building in 1968, the Centro Urbano Antonio Nariño (Antonio Nariño Urban Center) in 1952, and notably the concrete dome of the Periodicals Archive Hall (Hemeroteca) of the Biblioteca Luis Ángel Arango (Luis Ángel Arango Library). He was also involved in the design and construction of the Banco Central Hipotecario (BCH) building (Central Mortgage Bank) and the Ciudadela Colsubsidio. He founded the Aeroclub de Colombia and logged 15,000 hours of flight.

== Works ==
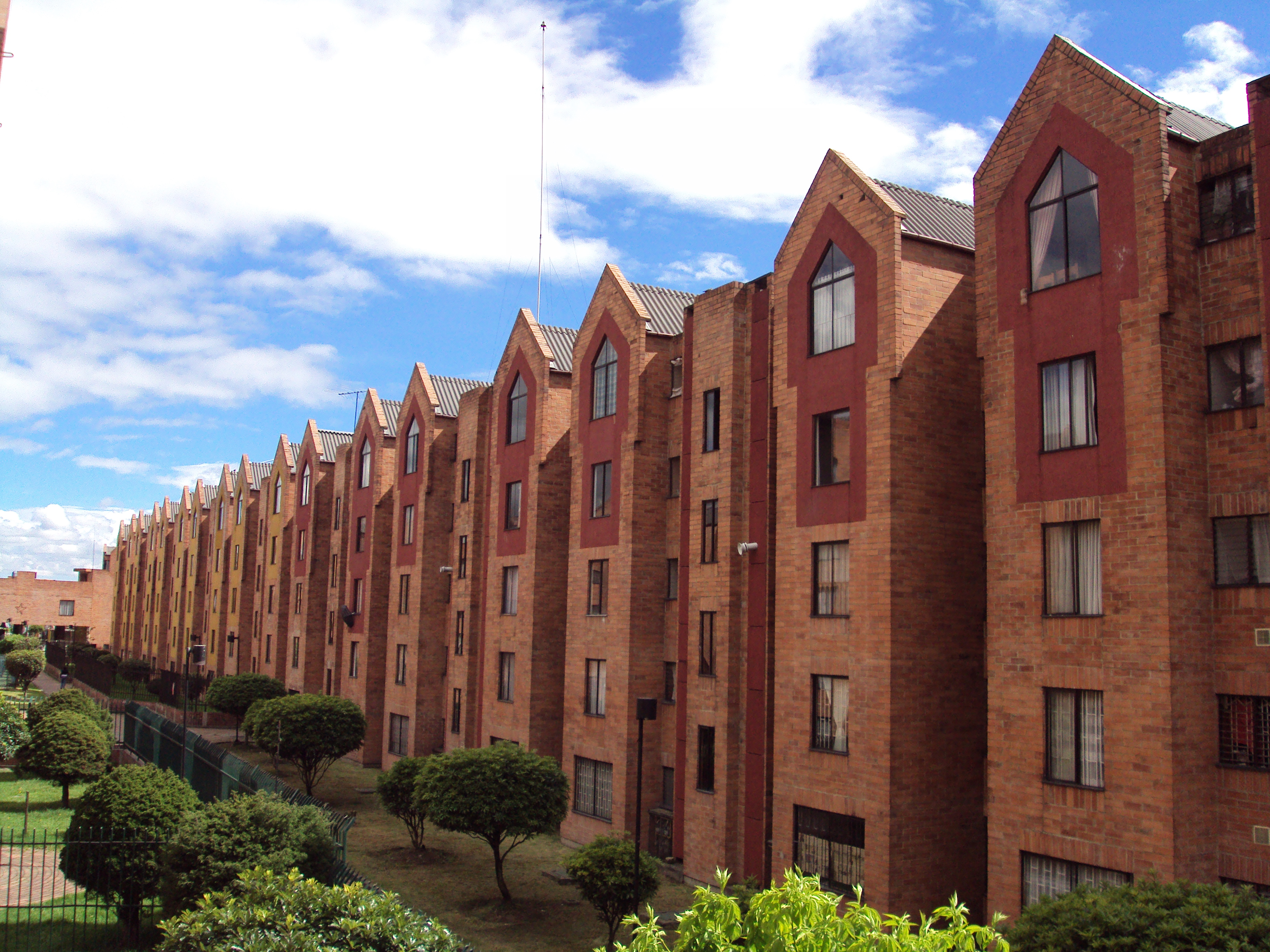
Ciudadela Colsubsidio

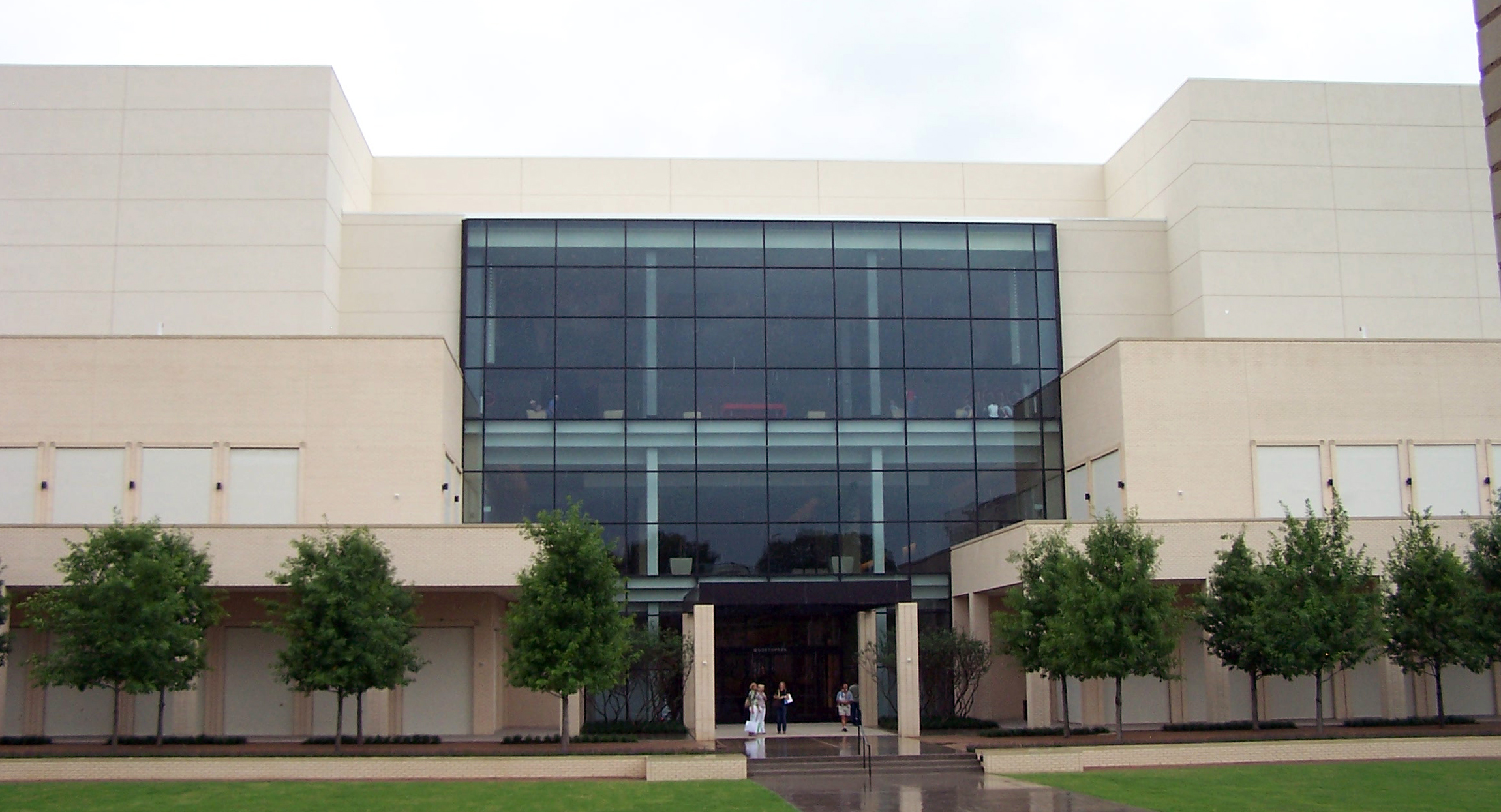
NorthPark Center

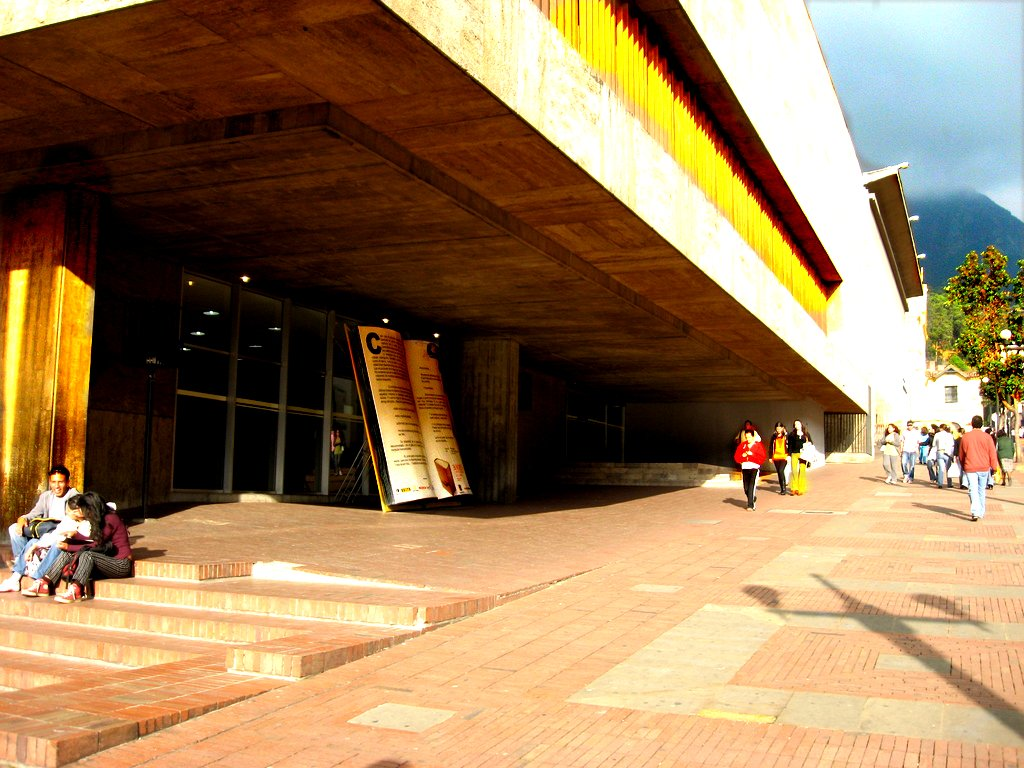
Luis Angel Arango Library, Bogotá

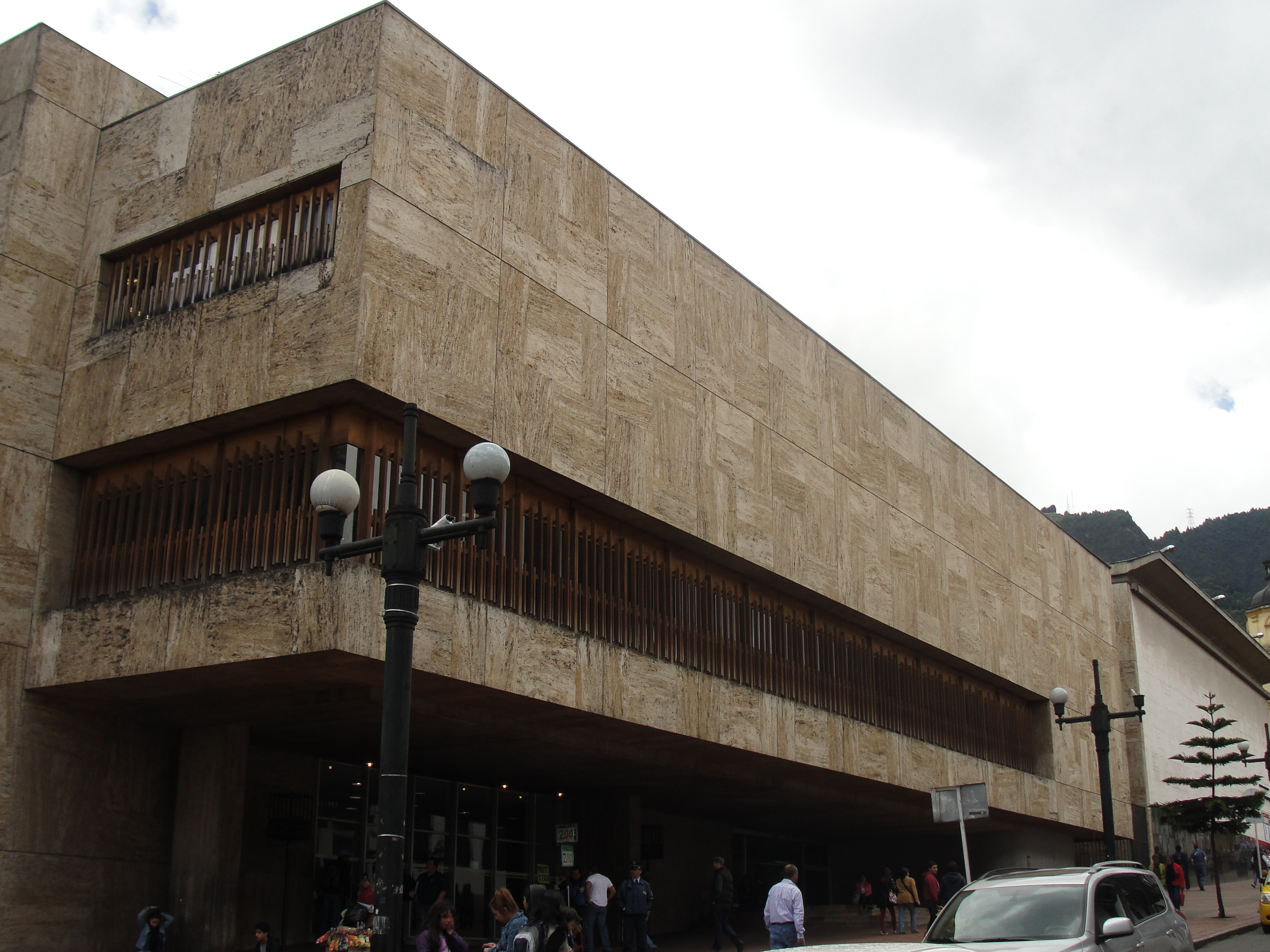
Luis Angel Arango Library

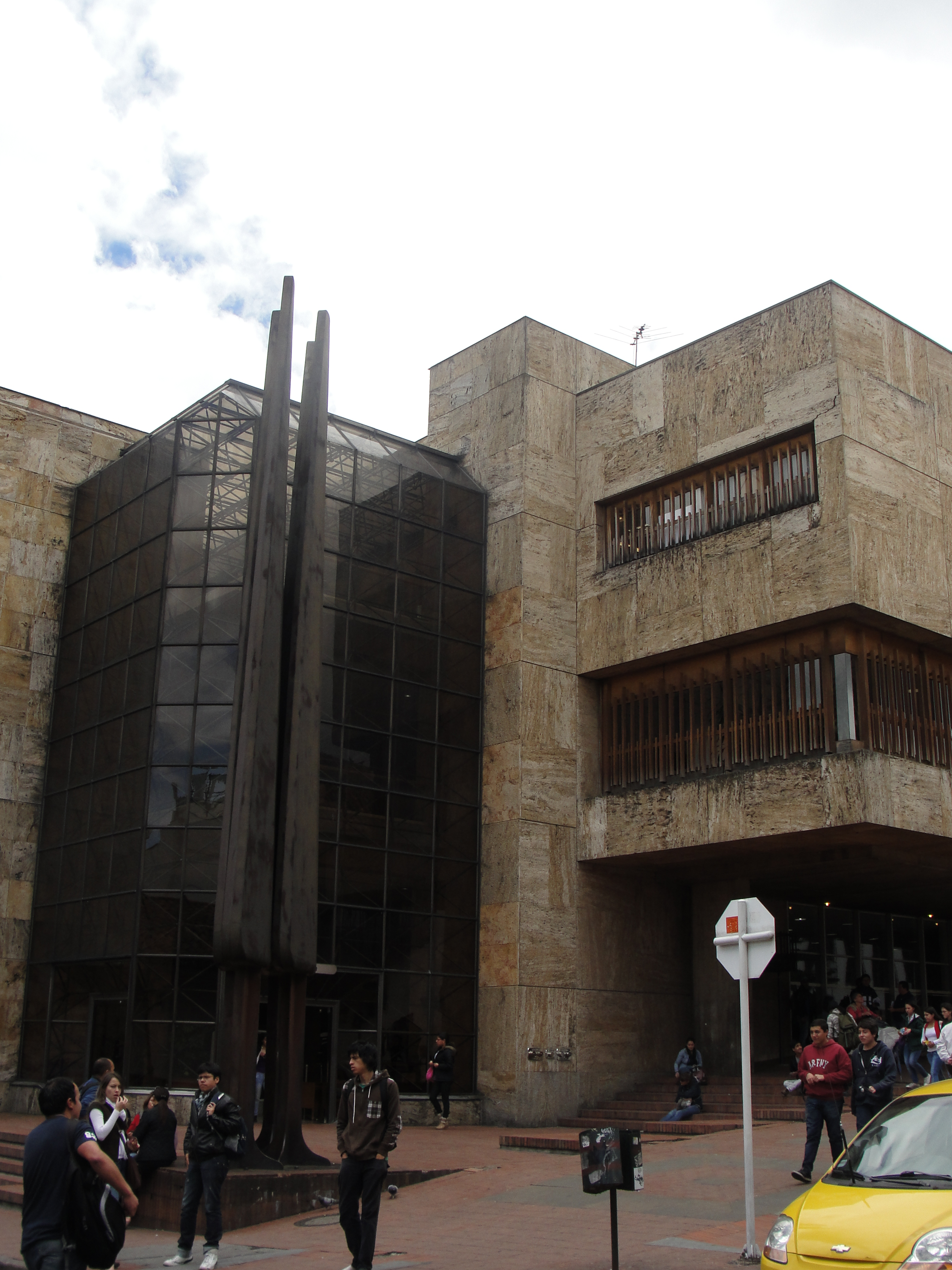
Luis Angel Arango Library

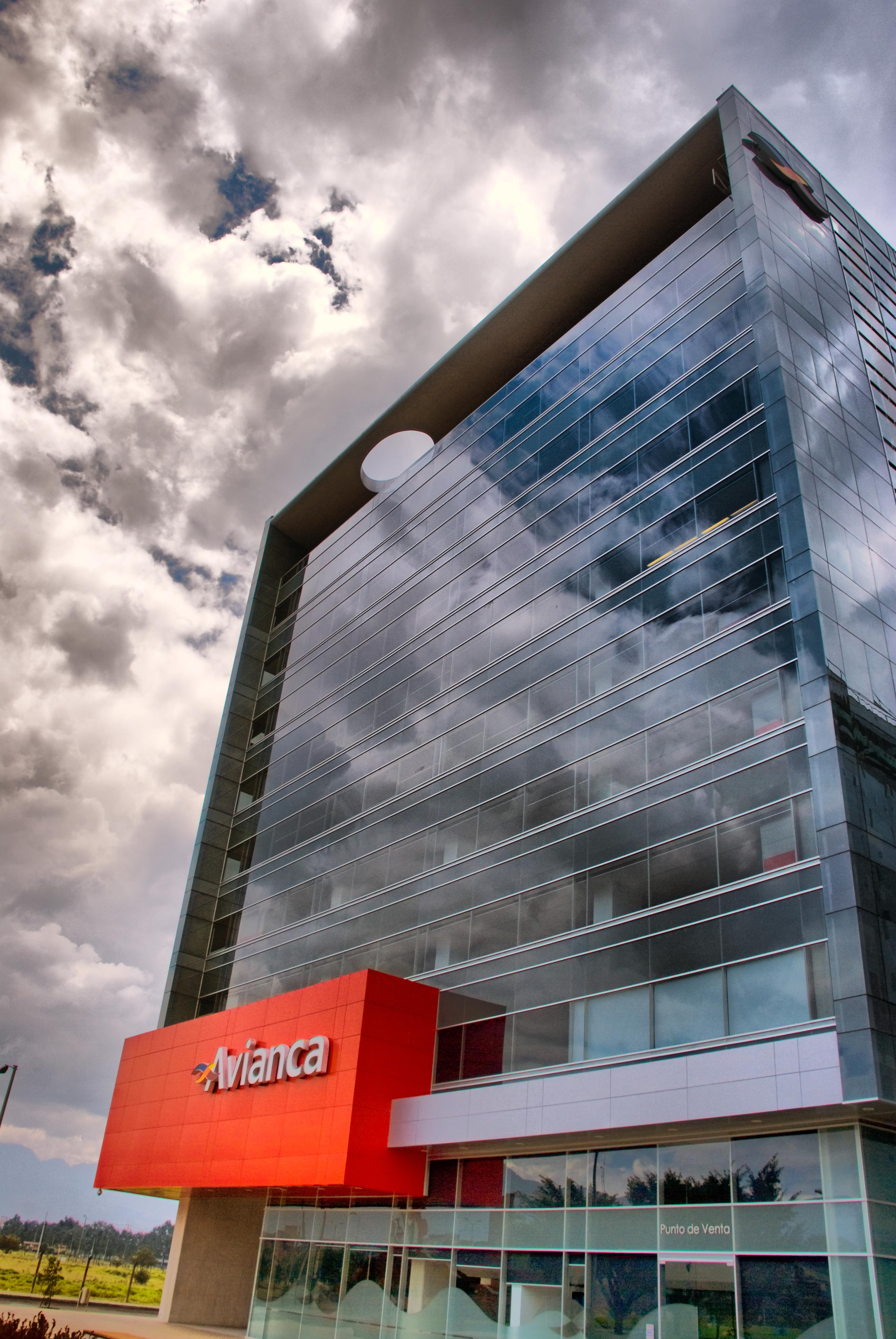
Avianca Building, Bogotá

== See also ==
- Colombian architecture
