= NOTIS =

NOTIS (Northwestern Online Total Integrated System) was a seminal integrated library system first created at Northwestern University, Evanston, IL USA in 1968. John P. McGowan, University Librarian from 1971 to 1992, recruited Professor James S. Aagaard to spearhead the project as lead programmer, and Velma Veneziano as systems analyst.

The core of the original system was written in IBM 360 Assembler and ran on an IBM mainframe. The first module to go into production was Circulation on January 19, 1970; followed by the Technical Services module in October 1971. The system officially received its name NOTIS in May 1976.

The first library outside of Northwestern University Library to implement NOTIS was the National Library of Venezuela in the Spring of 1979.

By 1985 NOTIS integrated the public access catalog (OPAC), circulation, acquisitions, serials control, cataloging, authority control, and database management. Automatic fund accounting was also under development. All NOTIS modules accessed a single bibliographic record.

In 1987 Northwestern University restructured the internal marketing department that had already sold the NOTIS system to several libraries outside of Northwestern, as NOTIS Systems, Inc, a for-profit corporation owned by the university. Jane Burke, who had been the marketing director for the NOTIS system since 1983, was appointed as President of the new corporation. By the fall of 1988 NOTIS software packages were in operation at more than 100 other sites.

Aagaard and Veneziano received the LITA/Gaylord Award for Achievement in Library and Information Technology award in July 1985 for their work on NOTIS. McGowan was named the 1989 Academic Librarian of the Year by the Association of College and Research Libraries for his work promoting automation and information technology in libraries.

Ameritech purchased NOTIS Systems, Inc. from Northwestern University on October 1, 1991.

The NOTIS History Webpage , created in October, 2014, is a comprehensive website giving a complete picture of NOTIS history.

== See also ==
- Dynix
