= Currency of Spanish America =

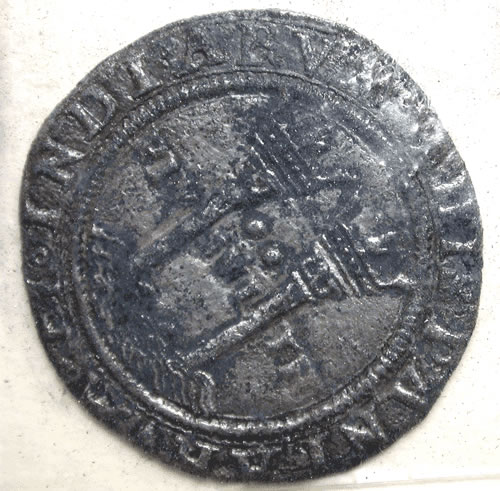
Charles V Spanish coin from the 1554 shipwreck in the Gulf of Mexico

This article provides an outline of the currency of Spanish America (las Indias, the Indies) from Spanish colonization in the 15th century until Spanish American independencies in the 19th. This great realm was divided into the Viceroyalty of New Spain (capital: Mexico City), which came to include all Spanish territory north of Panama, the West Indies, Venezuela, and the Philippines, and the Viceroyalty of Peru (capital: Lima), which included Panama and all Spanish territory in South America except Venezuela. The monetary system of Spanish America, originally identical to that of Spain, soon diverged and took on a distinctive character of its own, which it passed on to the independent nations that followed after.

== 1480–1516 Ferdinand and Isabella ==
=== 1497 Medina del Campo ===
Real (R) = 34 Maravedíes (mrs)

After the Spanish kingdoms were united under Ferdinand of Aragon and Isabella of Castile and soon after the conquest of Granada, the Spanish monetary system was reformed. This caused some damage to the kingdom. The maravedí had served as the Spanish money of account since the 11th century, but on June 2, 1497 the Ordinance of Medina del Campo (site of the great international fairs) made the real the unit of account, with the maravedí defined as a fraction of it (the 34th part). The standard silver coin became the real of 3·434 g, 0·9306 fine (3·195 g silver), rated 34 maravedíes. There was also a half, a 3, and a 6-real coin. This reform adopted the excelente (called ducado from 1504) for gold, a copy of the Venetian ducat, 3·521 g, 23 3/4 carats fine (3484·442 mg gold), rated 375 maravedíes. A third standard coin was the blanca, a small coin of 1·198 g, worth half a maravedí. The blanca was a copper coin containing a trace of silver, a type of coin known as billon, wellón in Spanish. This was the monetary system that the Spaniards brought to the New World.

=== 1502 Copper coins for Santo Domingo ===
The first distinctive coins minted for Spanish America were copper 4-maravedí pieces authorized for Santo Domingo by Ferdinand on December 20, 1505 (later confirmed by his daughter, Johanna, on May 10, 1531). These coins were minted in Spain (at Burgos and Seville) and shipped to Santo Domingo (Hispaniola), and subsequently also to Mexico and Panama. The first were struck 1502–1504 in the name of Ferdinand and Isabella, with an F-I monogram obverse and pillars reverse. Ferdinand died in 1516, and Johanna's son Charles became King Carlos I of Aragon and Regent of Castille, so the last coppers struck in the early 1520s had a Carlos-Johanna monogram.

== 1516–1556 Charles I ==
=== Escudo gold ===
Charles, who was also Holy Roman Emperor (as Karl V), reformed the gold coinage in 1537, replacing the ducado with the escudo or corona, essentially a debased ducat. The escudo, 24 mm, 3·383 g, 0·9167 fine (3101·117 mg gold), was rated 350 mrs. The ducado was not minted after 1537 but continued as a money of account (Ducado = 375 Maravedíes), especially for foreign exchange.

=== Tepuzque gold ===
Charles sent silver coins to New Spain in 1523, but this was insufficient for local commerce. A sort of "coin" was produced at Mexico City: gold discs stamped with their weight and fineness and sometimes with royal countermarks. These discs are known as Tepuzque (the Aztec word for copper) gold or peso de oro. Although not strictly coins, they did serve as money and circulated as late as 1591. No examples are known to exist.

=== Early Pillars type silver ===
Mexico City was growing and by 1525 it was petitioning the crown for a mint to produce coin locally in order to facilitate trade. This wish was granted by royal ordinance of May 11, 1535 and a mint opened and began producing silver coins at Mexico City in April 1536.

==== Type 1536 ====
The first silver struck in the Indies (Spanish America), known as the pillar type because it depicted the pillars of Hercules, were hand struck, typically on a full-sized round planchet of even thickness. Obv.: the crowned shield of Leon and Castile, quartered with castle and lion, with the pomegranate of Granada at the point of the shield, and on either side a mintmark (M for Mexico), the rim inscribed KAROLVS ET IOHANA REGES. Rev.: two crowned columns (pillars of Hercules) with PLVS (for plus ultra) on a banner and the value (dots or a number) between them, the rim continuing the inscription with HISPANIARVM ET INDIARVM. The full inscription appears only on the larger coins, becoming more abbreviated as coins size decreases. The small quarter real has a crowned initial K without mintmark obverse (instead of the shield); the half real had the initials K I and the mintmark below. The assayer's initial appears either on the reverse between the column bases (R or G), or on the obverse in place of one of the two mintmarks (P or F).

Struck at Mexico City between 1536 and 1542, undated.
Denominations:1/4,1/2, 1, 2, and 3 reales. (These coins are rare; perhaps only 300—400 specimens survive.) The 2 and 3-real coins were confused because of their similar size, so the 3 reales was discontinued in 1537. The 1/4 real was unpopular because of its small size; it was not minted after 1540.

==== Type 1542 ====
The reverse of the design was modified in 1542, when waves were placed between the two pillars and the full motto PLVS VLTRA, without a banner, appeared across the field.

Struck at Mexico City (1542–1572), Santo Domingo (1542–1564), and Lima (1568–1572); undated.
Denomination: 1, 2, and 4 reales. (At least 2,500 specimens of this series survive.)

=== Vellón coins ===
Vellón (copper) coins of 2 and 4 maravedíes were minted at Mexico City (and evidently at Santo Domingo 1542–1556), authorized June 28, 1542 by Viceroy Mendoza. They had K obverse and I reverse, each flanked by a lion and castle with the value under the I. They were rejected by the public, and they were withdrawn from circulation in 1556. Copper coins, which dominated currency circulation in Spain during the 17th century, were not minted again in Spanish America until the end of the 18th century. (The reason why copper coinage was not utilized in the Spanish colonies as small change is unresolved and a matter of dispute among economic historians. Royal regulations of 1565 specifically stated that neither gold nor wellón was authorized to be minted in the Indies.)

== 1556–1598 Philip II ==
After Philip II ascended the throne in 1556, Mexico City continued minting type 1542 coins in the name of Charles and Johanna. Lima, however, used the inscription PHILIPVS II.

From 1565 until 1821 there was an annual galleon convoy (Galeones de Manila-Acapulco) that crossed the Pacific from Acapulco loaded with silver coin, which was exchanged at Manila in the Philippines for Oriental goods, chiefly for spices, silk, tea, porcelain, and lacquerware.

The output of the American mines was usually shipped to Spain in the form of ingots or of crude, temporary coins (known as macuquinas in Spanish and as "cobs" in English). Ingots and cobs were a way to account for the 20% (royal fifth, quinto real) of all treasure due the king.

=== Monetary law of 1566 ===
The value of the escudo was raised on November 23, 1566 from 350 to 400 mrs, and multiples were introduced. The double escudo (doblón) was called a pistole in the rest of Europe and in England. The 8-escudo piece (onza de oro) was initially known as a double doubloon, then as a quadruple pistole, but eventually gained fame as the Spanish doubloon. This doubloon of 8 escudos eventually became the most common Spanish gold coin, equivalent to 16 silver pesos.

The 1566 reform also provided for a silver 8-real coin, the real de a ocho or peso duro (which had already been minted in Spain in limited number). This coin, 39–40 mm, 27·468 g, containing 25·561 g pure silver, was now struck in the Indies, at Lima from 1568 and at Mexico City from 1572. This coin was commonly known in English as the piece of eight.

=== 1572 cross type silver ===
The new coin design of 1572 (new for America, but already being minted in Spain) is known in English as the shield or the cross type. It was known in Mexico as maquina de papalote y cruz (windmill and cross money). These were hammered coins, produced quickly, and they generally deteriorated in quality throughout the period. Most cobs were soon melted down to produce coins, jewelry, etc. But many circulated as coin, but their crude appearance invited clipping, and many were soon lightweight. Obv.: the crowned Habsburg arms, with mintmark and assayer's initial left and the value right, the rim inscribed PHILIPVS II DEI GRATIA. Rev.: the quartered arms of Castile and León inside a quatrefoil design, the dividing lines emphasized, looking like a cross, the rim inscribed REX HISPANIARVM ET INDIARVM. The inscriptions are abbreviated on the smaller coins. Minor differences in design detail can be ascribed to a specific mint.

Struck at Mexico City 1572–1734, Santo Domingo 1572–1578, Lima 1572–1650, La Plata 1573–1574, Potosí 1574–1650, Panama 1580–1582, Cartagena (Colombia) 1622–1650, and Bogotá 1622–1650. This was the first New World type to be struck in the 8-real denomination.
Denomination: 1, 2, 4, and 8 reales

== 1598–1621 Philip III ==
Trade with the Far East and bullion shipments to Spain required ever greater quantities of processed silver. The demand for quantity led to ever poorer workmanship during the 17th century, so that coins were struck on crude pieces of silver. These roughly made lumps of silver, irregular in shape and thickness but of standard weight and fineness, conveniently served as temporary coins (macuquina or "cobs").

Philip III continued with the shield type of 1572 (inscribed PHILIPVS III), also in denominations of 1, 2, 4, and 8 reales. Mexico City coins were dated from 1607. Potosí, where the position of mint assayer was auctioned off to the highest bidder, only began dating coins in 1617, after a scandal involving an illegal debasement of the cob coinage (1610–1617). The dates were added to the obverse inscription, but because of the irregular shape of a cob, they are rarely legible.

Philip III unleashed the era of wellón in Spain in 1599, when his government attempted to remain solvent by authorizing wellón of pure copper. It was at this time that the flood of silver from Mexico and Peru peaked. The different kinds of coin—gold, silver, and wellón—had circulated at par since 1497, but heavy issues of wellón above its intrinsic value destroyed its customary acceptance at par, and began driving silver out of circulation. By 1620 accounts in Spain were being kept in reales of wellón, no longer in silver reales.

== 1621–1665 Philip IV ==
=== Coinage in Spain ===
The output of wellón in 1621–1626 was prodigious. Since 1599 over 15 billion maravedíes worth of wellón had been minted. Silver was constantly at a premium, and prices rose sharply. Then the influx of silver began declining in the 1630s as more silver was retained in America for colonial needs.

=== Coinage in America ===
Old world coin types used in early America are known from archeological evidence of coin hoards commencing at Santo Domingo, circa 1500, and onward. Most any coin used in the old world could have migrated to the new, with explorers and settlers embarking from many ports with some local change in their purses. On arrival in America the first coins were walked about, able to be found hundreds of miles away from where their owners first stepped ashore. Coin types found in abundance, such as "blancas" of the Catholic Monarchs, were likely drivers of early commerce, and not mere keepsakes of the immigrants. The first new world mint was authorized in 1536 at New Spain, Mexico City.

==== Philip's early coinage ====
Silver coins of the 1572 type were minted with PHILIPVS IV and a 1/2-real cob was added to the usual 1, 2, 4, and 8-real denominations. There were major gold deposits in Colombia; a mint opened at Santa Fe de Bogotá in 1620, and it produced the first gold coins (cobs) in Spanish America in 1622. Unlike silver, the gold coins show the king's portrait obverse.

A second illegal debasement of the cob coinage in the Viceroyalty of Peru in 1631–1648 was a major scandal. The public began refusing all Peruvian coins as potentially below standard. After this affair, the cross design was replaced at all the Peruvian mints by a new pillar-and-wave design. The reputation of coins from the Mexico City mint was unblemished, and cross type cobs continued to be produced there until 1734. Meanwhile, all Peruvian coins circulating in Spain were called to the mints in 1650 to be recoined.

==== 1651 pillars-and-waves type ====
After the debasement scandals in Peru, cross type cobs were replaced by a type known as pillars and waves in English and as Perulera in Spanish. These hand struck cobs, like the cross type, degraded in quality as time passed. Obv.: a cross with lions and castles (similar to the 1572 reverse). Rev.: a pair of pillars with waves below intersected by three horizontal lines of text, forming a tic-tac-toe design, the top line with the mintmark, the value, and the assayer's initial (e.g. L 8 M = Lima, 8 reales, assayer M), the middle line PLVS VLTR[A] (abbreviated on the smaller coins), the bottom line the assayer's initial, the last two numerals of the year, and the mintmark (e.g. M 88 L = assayer M, 1688, Lima).

Struck at the Bogotá, Potosí, Cartagena, and Lima mints from 1651 on. Even after the introduction of milled coinage in 1732, the Potosí mint continued to produce cobs of this type (the last in 1773). These cobs were generally accepted, but there were still occasional periods of debasement, and Peruvian coinage was usually considered inferior.

== 1665–1700 Charles II ==
Peso = 8 Reales

Escudo = 2 Pesos = 16 Reales

=== Currency reform of 1686 ===
The overissue of wellón coin in Spain had driven gold and silver from circulation. After the failure of numerous attempts to correct this situation, the currency finally underwent a major reform on October 14, 1686, when Spain devalued silver by ≈20% and adopted a dual coinage standard. The old silver standard (plata vieja) was maintained in the American colonies, but a new devalued silver (plata nueva) was adopted for circulation in Spain itself. The old piece of eight was valued at 10 reales of the new silver coin. The new 8-real coin was known as peso sencillo, the old piece of eight as peso fuerte. Foreign exchange was quoted in pesos de cambio, based on the old piece of eight, which continued to be produced in America. After this, the monetary systems of Spain and of Spanish America differed significantly.

=== Coinage in America ===
In 1675 Mexico was finally authorized to mint gold, producing its first gold cobs in December 1679, Lima minted its first gold in 1696.

The silver coins of the 16th century bore an irregular row of dots near the rim, which became more regular during the 17th century as gold coins took on a rounder, standard shape. The circle of dots (cordoncillo) was placed closer to the edge. Silver coins followed the gold in adopting these improved details, but the piece of eight did not show a clear outline until 1709.

== 1700–1746 Philip V ==
Peso (peso fuerte, duro) = 8 Reales

Onza de oro = 16 Pesos

Various Imperial thalers, called dollars in English, were familiar to North American colonists. The piece of eight had the same intrinsic value as the thaler and by the end of the 17th century it too was being called dollar (and was so designated in Jamaican monetary legislation of 1738). By the mid 18th century the piece of eight was commonly known in British North America as the Spanish dollar. Colloquial terms used in New Spain were: pataca for the peso (real de a ocho), tostón for the medio peso (4 reales), and peseta for the 2 reales.

Gold circulation became more common in Spanish America after 1704, when the West Indies adopted a gold standard.

After 1716 the Spanish mints flooded Spain with debased silver based on the real sencillo of 3·067 g, containing 2·556 g silver. These silver coins were called plata provincial. The silver minted in America was now officially called plata nacional, but was also called plata vieja (old silver) or plata gruesa (heavy silver), and occasionally plata doble (double silver).

The British East India Company had established a regular trade with China by 1720, paying for goods with Spanish silver.

To prevent sweating and clipping, laws of 1728 and 1730 adopted modern minting techniques. Gold and silver coins were to be perfectly round and to have milled edges. There was a reduction in weight and fineness, the peso becoming 27·064 g (the same weight as the gold onza), with 24·809 g pure silver. The onza de oro or peso duro de oro (8-escudo piece) was 27·064 g, 22 carats fine, 24,808·936 mg pure gold. The Mexico City mint was the first to comply, in 1732, using an up-to-date screw press. An edge design, resembling a tulip, was put on the 8-reales to make any clipping evident. Technical problems and local resistance to design change delayed the adoption of milled coinage at Lima and Santiago until 1751.

=== Milled pillar silver of 1732 ===
The milled pillar type of 1732, columnario in Spanish, was machine struck on a full-sized round planchet. Obv.: the crowned arms of Castile and León, the assayer's initial left, the value right, the rim inscribed PHILIP•V•D•G•HISPAN•ET•IND•REX+. Rev.: two orbs (representing the Old and the New Worlds) under a crown and over the Straits of Gibraltar, flanked by two crowned pillars with PLUS VLTR[A] on banners wrapped around the columns, the inscription VTRAQUE VNUM, and below, the date, preceded and followed by the mintmark. The obverse shield is the usual lions, castles, and pomegranate, but with the center defaced by the Bourbon arms (three fleurs-de-lis). Some minor modifications were subsequently made in the location of the mintmark and assayer's initials. The 8-real coin, 39.5 mm, was given a protective corded edge design resembling a tulip.

Produced until 1772: at Mexico from 1732, Santiago and Lima from 1751, Guatemala City from 1754, Santa Fe de Bogotá from 1759, and Potosí from 1767. During the production of these coins some minor modifications were made in the location of the mintmark and assayer's initials. The old style cobs continued to be produced in the Viceroyalty of Peru, with the last coming from the Potosí mint in 1773.

Denominations:1/2, 1, 2, 4, and 8 reales.

The 8-reales produced from 1732 until 1772 was the coin that became a standard in the English colonies in North America: it is the coin referred to in colonial contracts calling for payment in Spanish milled dollars.

=== Milled gold of 1732 ===
The first milled gold was also produced in 1732 at the Mexico City mint. The production of gold cobs continued until 1750, after which time they were completely replaced by milled coinage. The gold coins feature an obverse portrait design, and the royal arms (reverse) appear smaller than on the silver coins to allow for the encircling collar of the Golden Fleece. The royal titles are the same as on the silver, but the legends vary. The 1732–1747 type bears the inscription INITIUM SAPIENTIAE TIMOR DOMINI.

== 1746–1759 Ferdinand VI ==
=== Coinage in Spain ===
The debased Spanish provincial silver was supposed to remain in Spain, but it crossed the Atlantic to create problems. The 2-real coin was particularly common in the English colonies, where it was known as a pistareen. It was easily distinguished from the Spanish American silver because provincial silver had the crowned heraldic Habsburg shield obverse and cross with the Castile and León shield reverse, and were known as "cross" pistareens (and cross reales). The peso duro (dollar) was usually worth five pistareens.

On May 4, 1754 Ferdinand VI prohibited the circulation in America of all money coined in Spain, including national gold and silver coins identical with those minted in America. The quantity of overvalued provincial silver in circulation was so great that colonial officials lacked the means to redeem and remove it from circulation.

=== Coinage in America ===
In 1748 the inscription on the gold coins was changed to NOMINA MAGNA SEQUOR (until 1759). Lima switched from producing gold cobs to minting milled gold in 1751. A mint opened at Santiago, Chile, in 1750, which produced chiefly gold coins. The rim inscription is FERDND•VI•D•G•HISPAN•ET•IND•REX+ obverse, and +VTRAQUE VNUM+[mintmark]+[year]+[mintmark]+ reverse. On the silver 8-real coin the royal Spanish crown on top of the left pillar was replaced in 1754 by an Imperial crown.

== 1759–1788 Charles III ==
=== Coinage type of 1759 ===
The silver of Charles III bore the rim inscription CAROLUS•III•D•G•HISPAN•ETIND•REX+ obverse, and +VTRA QUE VNUM+(mintmark)+(year)+(mintmark)+ reverse. The 8-real piece was commonly called the Carolus dollar in English. The inscription on the gold coins of Charles III was changed to IN UTROQ FELIX AUSPICE DEO (and remained thus until the American colonies gained independence).

=== Spanish dollars in China ===
After 1757, China restricted European trade to Canton (see Thirteen Factories for a description of this trading system). The British East India Company dominated this trade and paid for its purchases with Spanish Carolus dollars, which were accepted in China for more than the 4s:2d sterling that was considered their intrinsic value. Chinese merchants gradually became accustomed to the dependable weight and fineness of Spanish milled silver and, instead of melting the coins down, they began to use them as currency, often with a chop (seal, countermark) to guarantee its acceptability.

=== Coinage of 1772 ===
Charles adopted new coin designs with the royal profile, more difficult to counterfeit, and his Pragmatic of May 29, 1772 ordered all money in circulation in Spain and the Indies to be recoined at the same weight and fineness, but he secretly instructed the mints to lower the fineness of national gold from 22 carats to 21 5/8 and of national silver from 0·91667 to 0·90278. This gave a peso of 27·064 g with 24·433 g silver and an onza of 27·064 g with 24,386·057 mg gold.

These coins are known as the "portrait" or "modified pillar" type in English, and as busto in Spanish. (English head real was applied to the provincial silver real coined in Spain, which was 20% lighter.) Obv.: bust of the king, the rim inscribed CAROLUS III DEI GRATIA with the date. Rev.: two columns (pillars of Hercules) with the motto PLUS VLTRA on banners, but the two orbs between the columns were replaced with the crowned shield of Leon and Castile, the rim inscribed HISPAN. ET IND. REX, then the mintmark, value, and assayer's initials. The corded (tulip) edge of the eight reales was replaced with an edge design of alternating circles and rectangles.

=== Coinage of 1786 ===
Secret instructions to the mints, June 25, 1786 reduced the fineness of escudos to 21 carats (0·875). This should have produced an onza containing 23,681·257 mg fine gold, but foreign assays show the coins only 0·8698 fine, and those minted after 1800 consistently 0·8646 fine. Assays made by Bonneville on coins minted 1786–1800 showed that all silver was minted only 0·8958 fine. (The old, true standard was not restored until after 1821.)

== 1788–1808 Charles IV ==
Because of problems in supplying new dies, an edict of December 24, 1788 authorized the American mints to continue using the dies with the portrait of Charles III, while changing the name to Charles IIII by adding another Roman numeral I. New dies finally arrived in 1791. The 8 reales was struck at Potosí in 1789 and 1790 with the bust of Charles III but the name altered to "IV", then with the new portrait of Charles IV in 1791. The first cuarto (1/4 real) was struck at Mexico City in 1794.

== 1808–1821 Ferdinand VII ==
The colonies were cut off from Spain by the French occupation and the Peninsular War of 1808–1814. They were ruled by independent juntas who refused to recognize Joseph Bonaparte (Spanish: José Napoleón Bonaparte), proclaimed King of Spain and the Indies and older brother of Napoléon Bonaparte, Emperor of the French, instead declaring allegiance to the deposed Ferdinand VII. But the independence movement had already been initiated in earnest by Francisco de Miranda, and in 1810 it broke out in full force.

The Spanish Napoleonic coinage was used only in Spain. The American mints initially minted coins with the portrait of Ferdinand VII. The minting of royalist coins effectively ended in 1821, when republican forces captured the mint at Lima (although republican coins were counterstamped as royalist at Lima in 1824).

== Monetary legacy ==
The monetary unit in the former Spanish colonies was the silver peso, with a value of 8 reales. Silver coins were: cuartillo (1/4 R), medio (1/2 R), real, peseta (2 R), medio peso (4 R), and peso (8 R). If minted to standard, they were either 0·916 fine or (from 1772) 0·902 fine. Circulation also included a varying quantity of macuquina, worn, and of varying weight and fineness. There were also silver coins of various types that had been produced by republicans and royalists during the struggle for independence.

Gold did not circulate as common currency. It was used primarily in international trade and for hoarding, The standard coin was the gold onza, with variations in fineness, the pre-1771 coins being 0·9165 fine; the 1771 type, 0·901 fine; and the 1786 type, only 0.875 fine.

Copper coins were also in circulation, having appeared in quantity during the struggles for independence.

== Technical summary ==
The mint standards were set by the Spanish crown and until 1686 the coinage of Spain and of the Indies (Spanish America) were identical, save in two respects. A minor difference was that coins minted in America were inscribed REX HISPANIARVM ET INDIARVM (king of the Spains and the Indies), while those minted in Spain had only REX HISPANIARVM. The major difference was that wellón or copper coins were not minted for circulation in the Spanish American colonies, while after 1602 the currency of Spain itself consisted chiefly of copper coin.

Although Mexico and Peru were the chief source of the world's silver, after 1620 silver was always at a premium in Spain and wellón constituted the accounting unit and the chief medium of exchange (the cuarto also became a common accounting unit). The silver flowed through Spain in a steady stream to pay for imports, wars, and imperial expansion.

Philip IV reformed Spain's monetary system in 1686 by debasing the silver coinage, which had been unchanged since 1497. This reform applied only to coins minted in Spain. The coinage of the American colonies, which had already assumed great importance in international trade, was left untouched, and the 1497 silver standard continued in use (until 1728). From this time on, the monetary systems and currencies of Spain and of Spanish America developed differently.

Coins were defined by monetary regulations as so many minted per mark weight and of a certain minimum fineness. The mint mark used was the mark of Castile. It originated when Alfonso X (1252–1284) replaced the Roman pound (libra) with the Cologne mark. Spanish numismatists usually use the weight of this mark as determined in 1799, i.e. 230·0465 grams. The measure of fineness (ley in Spanish) for gold was 24 quilates (carats), each of 4 granos (grains); the measure for silver was 12 dineros, each of 24 granos.

Standard Reference Coins Minted in Spanish America according to the legal definition
coin	# per mark	fineness (ley)	weight g	millesimal fineness	fine metal
Silver coin
1497–1728 standard
real	67	11d 4gr	3·433	·9305	3·195 g
peso	8 3/8	11d 4gr	27·468	·9305	25·561 g
1728–1772 standard
real	68	11d 0gr	3·383	·9166	3·101 g
peso	8 1/2	11d 0gr	27·064	·9166	24·809 g
1772–1786 standard
real	68	10d 20gr	3·383	·9028	3·054 g
peso	8 1/2	10d 20gr	27·064	·9028	24·433 g
1786–1821 standard
real	68	10d 18gr	3·383	·8958	3·031 g
peso	8 1/2	10d 18gr	27·064	·8958	24·245 g
Gold Coin
1536–1772 standard
escudo	68	22q	3·383	·9166	3,101·117 mg
onza	8 1/2	22q	27·064	·9166	24,808·936 mg
1772–1786 standard
escudo	68	21q 2·5gr	3·383	·9010	3,048·257 mg
onza	8 1/2	21q 2·5gr	27·064	·9010	24,386·057 mg
1786–1821 standard
escudo	68	21q	3·383	·875	2,960·157 mg
onza	8 1/2	21q	27·064	·875	23,681·257 mg

== Mints ==
The four early, permanent mints in the Indies were:

- Mexico City (1536–1821)
- Lima (1568–1572, 1577–1588, 1659–1660, 1684–1824)
- Potosí (1574–1825)
- Santa Fe de Bogotá (1622–1820)

Early ephemeral mints were five:

- Santo Domingo (1542–1564, 1573–1578)
- La Plata (modern Sucre) (1573–1574)
- Panama City (1580–1582)
- Cartagena (1622–1655)
- Cuzco (1698)

Later permanent mints were three:

- Guatemala City (1733–1821)
- Santiago de Chile (1749–1817)
- Popayán (1758–1822)

== Other references consulted ==
- Standard Catalog of World Coins: Spain, Portugal and The New World, by Krause-Mishler (2002) (Contributor: Daniel Frank Sedwick )
- Calbetó de Grau, Gabriel. 1970. Compendio de las Piezas de Ocho Reales. 2 volumes/tomos. San Juan, Puerto Rico: Ediciones Juan Ponce de León.
- Bischoff, William, editor 1989. The Coinage of El Perú, New York: American Numismatic Society.
- Cayón, Adolfo, Clemente Cayón and Juan Cayón. 1998. Las Monedas Españolas, Del tremis al euro, Del 411 a nuestros días. Madrid
