= Currency of Colombia =

Currency in Colombia denotes the ingots, coins, and banknotes that have been used in Colombia since 1622. It was in that year, under a licence purchased from King Philip III of Spain, that Alonso Turrillo de Yebra established a mint at Santa Fe de Bogotá and a branch mint at Cartagena de las Indias, where gold cobs were produced as part of Colombia's first currency. Silver milled coins date from 1627. In 1831, Gran Colombia dissolved into Venezuela and New Granada. In 1836, in New Granada, new monetary laws were passed, to standardise the money produced in the country. From 1861 to 1862, due to financial instability, the United States of New Granada accepted British currency, the name of the country becoming the United States of Colombia in 1862. In 1880, Colombia pegged the peso to the gold standard due to the falling price of silver. In 1886, the paper peso was introduced. In 1931, Colombia abandoned the gold standard and switched to the current form of the peso.

== Spanish colonial coinage ==
Peso = 8 Reales
Escudo = 2 Pesos (after 1686)

During the Spanish colonial period, present-day Colombia was part of the New Kingdom of Granada (Nuevo Reino de la Granada, or more simply Nueva Granada).

=== 1622–1756 Cob coinage (macuquina) ===
In 1620, Philip III sold a license to Alonso Turrillo de Yebra to establish a mint at Santa Fe de Bogotá and a branch mint at Cartagena de las Indias. These two mints began production of gold cobs in 1622—the first gold coins struck in the Americas. The Cartagena mint operated sporadically, finally closing in 1655. The Bogotá mint (sometimes called the Santa Fé or the Nuevo Reino mint) continued producing gold cobs until 1756. Its production of silver cobs was very limited. The earliest known piece of eight from Bogotá is dated 1627. Cobs were a special problem because their irregular shape invited clipping, so most cobs were (eventually) under legal weight (although of proper fineness).

=== 1756–1822 Milled coinage ===
The Bogotá mint began producing milled coins in 1756. A second mint opened at Popayán in 1758. Both mints produced gold escudos of the milled bust type, and a very limited number of milled silver coins. Most of the silver coin circulating in New Granada was from the Spanish mints in Mexico City and Potosí.

During the 18th century, official Spanish-American coin standards changed more than once. Older coins remained in circulation, so that three types of milled gold coin and two types of silver coin were circulating at the beginning of the 19th century. Furthermore, old silver macuquinas (cobs) also remained in circulation.

=== 1813–1820 Necessity coinage ===
The royalists contributed to the monetary chaos during the wars for independence by making several necessity issues of coins with a reduced silver content. After the Viceroyalty of New Granada was restored in 1816, the Spanish authorities attempted to limit the circulation of poor quality coin, including the necessity money issued by their own troops, but they made special efforts to withdraw the republican-issued Indian-head coins that symbolized independence from Spain.

==== Popayán ====
The royalists produced copper coins at Popayán during the war of independence:

- 1/2 real
- 2 reales
- 8 reales

==== Santa Marta ====
The Spanish occupied Santa Marta in May 1812 (until 1818). Both in Santa Marta and Cartagena the Spanish-minted coins were of neither uniform weight nor fineness (making them relatively easy to counterfeit). General Morillo's army circulated this "Santa Marta money" or caraqueña in areas it occupied.

In 1813 the royalists minted crude copper coins in imitation of macuquinas at Santa Marta with the initials "S.M." and "F.VII". These were recalled and effectively withdrawn in 1814. The withdrawn coppers were returned to circulation in 1817 because of a shortage caused by a delay in the delivery of coin from Bogotá. A copper cuartillo and a silver peseta were minted in 1820.

Copper coin of 1813:

- cuartillo (1/4 real)
- medio (1/2 real)

Copper coin of 1820:

- medio

Silver coin of 1820:

- peseta (R.2)

== 1811–1820 United Provinces of New Granada ==
The United Provinces of New Granada (Provincias Unidas de la Nueva Granada) was proclaimed on 11 November 1811. The republicans minted coins of poor quality during the war of independence in order to pay the troops and cover military expenses. They also attempted to use paper money.

=== 1811–1815 Cartagena money ===
In 1811 the Junta Patriótica de Cartagena (Cartagena Patriotic Council) authorized coins of 1/2 and 2 reales, and for want of silver they were minted in copper. A law of 23 March 1812 authorized the government of Cartagena to issue up to 300,000 pesos fuertes (strong pesos) in notes of one real, and this issue was guaranteed by the Constitution of the State of Cartagena de Indias, passed on 14 June.

The general public, accustomed to metallic currency, avoided the paper money. To make matters worse, the notes were easily counterfeited. They rapidly fell in value until 100 pesos in paper was worth only 16 pesos in gold. The notes were used to pay the troops, but this stopped when soldiers began deserting. Finally, the government agreed (2 April 1813) to exchange the notes for treasury certificates paying 5% and renewable every four months. The copper coins, on the other hand, were well received and continued to be produced until 1815.

==== Coin ====
Copper coin, minted 1811–1815:

- medio (R.1/2)
- peseta (R.2)

==== Paper ====
An unknown quantity of currency notes for 1 real, printed in black on ordinary paper, signed by Germán Gutiérrez de Piñeres, chairman of the Junta Patriótica, was put into circulation in the latter half of 1812 and early in 1813.

=== 1813–1816 Cundinamarca ===
Cundinamarca made three issues of provincial coin with a reduced silver content. The type was the feathered head of an Indian woman, known locally as china (young maiden), but usually referred to as India (Indian) by Spanish-speaking numismatists. The first issue was authorized by President Antonio Nariño to finance the Southern Campaign against the Spanish, who had occupied Popayán, and its circulation was approved by the State of Cundinamarca on 27 September 1814.

The coins were minted between 1814 and 1816 in the amount of 72,675 pesos. They were only 7 dineros fine (.583 millesimal fineness). There was considerable variation in weight and diameter—each coin's name, value in reales (R), theoretical diameter, and weight are given below.

Obverse: Figure: the head of an Indian, crowned with feathers. Legend: LIBERTAD AMERICANA. But the obverse of the diminutive 1/4 real has a Phrygian cap, without legend. All coins have the date on the obverse.

Reverse: Figure: a pomegranate, centered (from the name of the Viceroyalty, "Granada" meaning "pomegranate"). Legend: NUEVA GRANADA and CUNDINAMARCA (but not on the 1/4 real).

- cuartillo (R.1/4), 11.5 mm, 0.846 g
- medio (R.1/2), 16.5 mm, 1.692 g
- real (R.1), 19.5 mm, 3.383 g
- peseta (R.2), 24.5 mm, 6.766 g

=== 1819 Emergency overstrikes ===
Soon after the Battle of Boyacá (7 August 1819), General Simón Bolívar authorized an emergency issue, which was produced by overstriking about 112 kg of royalist macuquinas. They were first put into circulation on 12 November 1819. Most of this coin was sent to Venezuela.

=== 1819 Nueva Granada ===
The second Indian-head (India) issue was authorized by General Bolívar before he knew of the proclamation of the Republic of Colombia. The obverse is the same as that of the 1814–1816 issue, but NUEVA GRANADA, only, appeared on the reverse. These coins are dated 1819 (diameter and weight are approximate):

- real, 19.5 mm, 2.65 g
- 2 reales, 24.5 mm, 5.00 g
- 4 reales, 34 mm, 12.00 g
- peso (R.8), 37 mm, 24.00 g

== 1821–1830 Gran Colombia ==
Peso = 8 Reales (silver)
Escudo = 2 Pesos (gold)

The Republic of Colombia (República de Colombia), known as Gran Colombia, was successor to the Viceroyalty of New Granada. It encompassed modern-day Colombia, Venezuela, and Ecuador, and it retained the Spanish colonial monetary system, based on the silver peso and gold escudo.

Simón Bolívar prohibited (20 June 1821) the circulation of all copper coin and all post-1810 royalist coin that had not been counter stamped at Bogotá. Only milled coin, old and new, and the old Spanish macuquina were permitted to circulate. This was confirmed by the Congress of Cúcuta, which adopted the coin standard of 1786 for gold and of 1772 for silver. While a "strong" peso in good Spanish colonial coin amounted to over 24 g fine silver, a peso in macuquina varied between .908 and .916 fine with an average weight of about 25 g, giving 22.75-23.00 g fine silver. Copper coins minted at Cartagena and Santa Marta, and silver of inferior quality was ordered withdrawn (29 September 1821), but the government lacked the resources needed to do this.

A note issue was proposed to finance Bolívar's army, and a quantity of peso-denominated notes was printed by Peter Maverick of New York. This move was supported by Antonio Nariño but opposed by Vice President Francisco de Paula Santander. In the end, the notes were never issued.

Gran Colombia introduced a national currency inscribed "República de Colombia", minting silver and gold at Bogotá and Popayán, and copper cuartillos at Caracas. Copper coin was made legal tender to one peso fuerte. The monetary law of 31 May 1823, confirmed that of 1821 but allowed the (temporary) minting of silver coin only .666 fine. Colombia's currency was composed of a variety of coins, pre-1772 pesos, pesos of the 1772 and 1786 standards, macuquinas (cobs) of diverse types, and various coins minted by republicans and royalists during the wars of independence. This situation would continue for decades despite several attempts to unify the currency.

=== 1820–1826 Cundinamarca ===
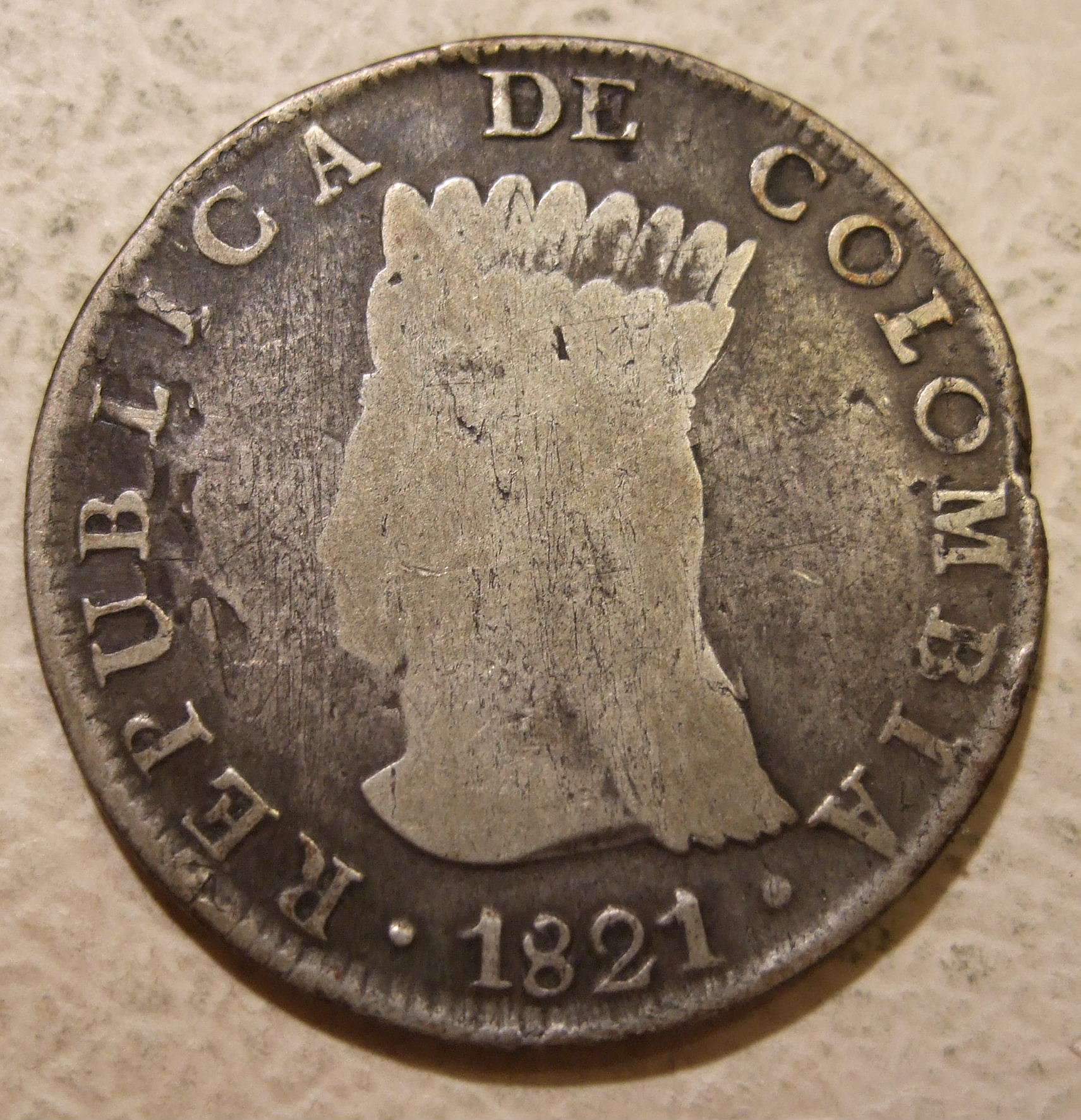
Obverse of silver 1821 8 Real, or 1 Peso, coin: figure of Indian with feathered bonnet, with legend "REPUBLICA DE COLOMBIA" and date

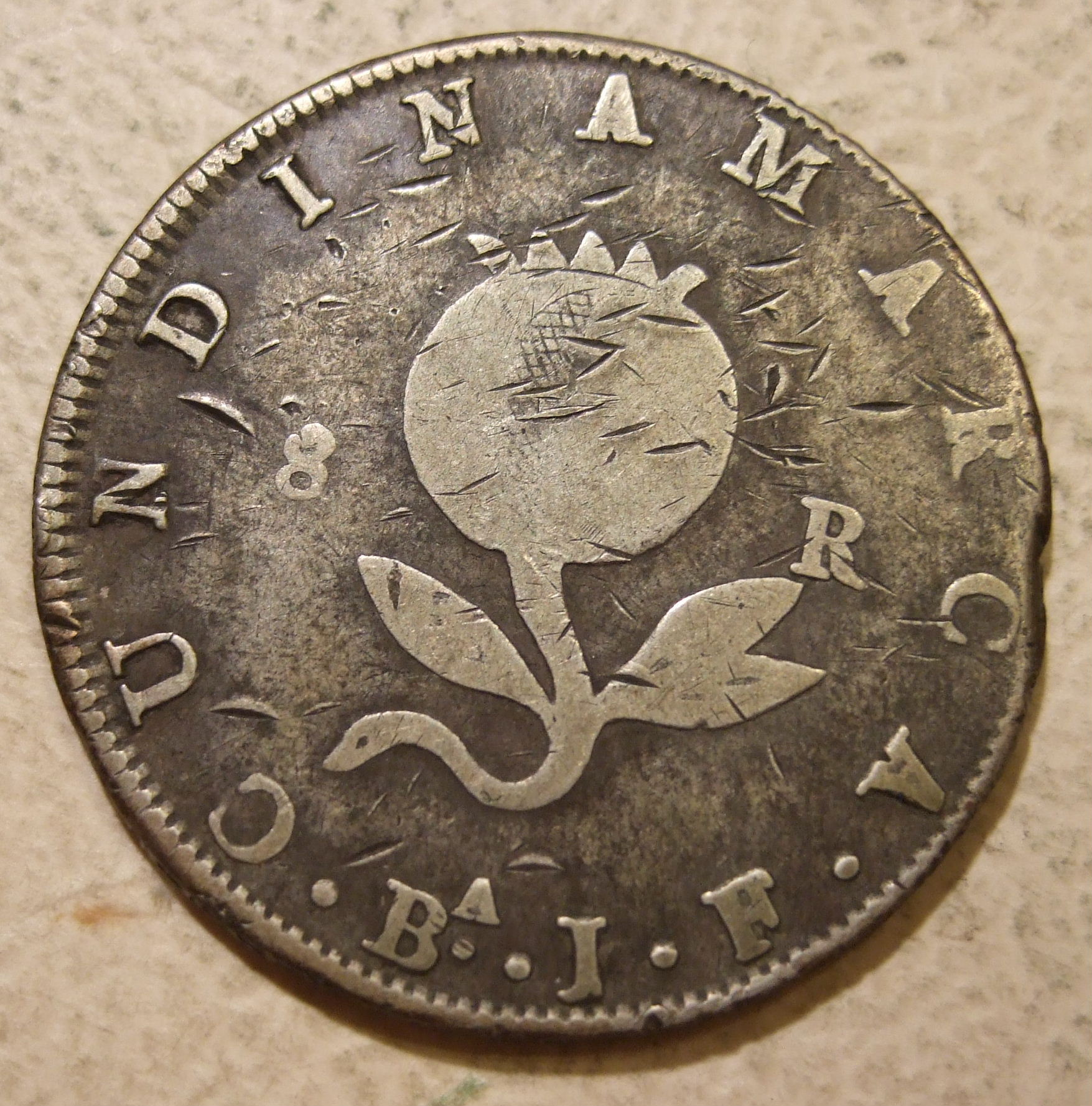
Reverse: figure of pomegranate, "8" and "R" on either side, with legend "CUNDINAMARCA", Bogotá mint mark "B^{A}", and assayer's initials "J.F."

Proclamation of Gran Colombia led to a third type of India coinage, dated 1820, with REPUBLICA DE COLOMBIA replacing LIBERTAD AMERICANA and CUNDINAMARCA replacing NUEVA GRANADA. On discreet orders from Gen. Santander this type was issued between 1823 and 1826 with the date frozen at 1821, because the Congress of Cúcuta had legally set the fineness of all silver coined after 1821 to the old Spanish standard of .903 fine, while these coins were only .666 fine.

- cuartillo (R.1/4)
- medio (R.1/2)
- real (R.1)
- peseta (R.2)
- peso (R.8)

=== Monetary law of 1826 ===
The monetary law of 14 March 1826 established the peso, divided into 8 reales, as the base of the monetary system, in both silver and gold, and named it the colombiano. It provided for a gold coinage of an onza (28.76 g) and its half (media onza), quarter (doblón), eighth (escudo), and sixteenth (the colombiano de oro or gold peso, 1.797238 g), a silver coinage of a peso or colombiano de plata and its half, quarter (peseta), eighth (real), sixteenth (medio real), and thirty-second (cuartillo), and a copper 1/8 real (7.19 g). It ordered the withdrawal of macuquinas of below-standard fineness. A supplementary law of 17 May 1826, provided for a platinum coinage.

==== Macuquina ====
Despite the standards set by the 1826 monetary law, when the macuquina was withdrawn from circulation, it was reminted with a fineness of only .666. The Bogotá and Popayán mints were unable to cope with the large volume of macuquinas, so re-coining was done little by little. Since the macuquina was legal tender at face value, Gresham's law came into operation: good reminted coin fled to Venezuela and Ecuador, while new supplies of macuquinas entered Colombia, especially from the Antilles. The unrestricted circulation of macuquinas was confirmed on 6 November 1828, and its obligatory acceptance at par was confirmed by another law of 14 October 1831. New milled coin disappeared, replaced by the macuquina.

==== Milled Coin ====
Silver .666 fine, dated 1827–1836:

- 1/4 real, 11.5 mm
- 1/2 real, 14.5 mm
- real, 20 mm

Silver .833 fine, dated 1834–1836

- colombiano (R.8), 36.5 mm

Gold .875 fine, dated 1822–1838:

Obverse: liberty head center; rim REPUBLICA DE COLOMBIA·[date]·

Reverse: fasces with superimposed crossed bow and arrows within two cornucopias forming a wreath

- colombiano (peso; E.1/2), 15 mm
- escudo (E.1), 20 mm
- doblón (E.2), 22 mm
- media onza (E.4), 31 mm
- onza de oro (E.8), 37 mm

== 1831–1858 New Granada ==
On 21 November 1831, Gran Colombia dissolved into Quito (Ecuador), Venezuela, and New Granada (present-day Colombia), New Granada used "state" in its formal name (Estado de la Nueva Granada), anticipating the possibility that the three states might still form a confederation. "Republic" was not adopted until 20 April 1843 (and "New Granada" did not give way to "Colombia" until 1858).

=== Monetary law of 1836 ===
The monetary law of 4 April 1836 attempted to standardize the coinage by establishing uniform fineness, weight, value, type, and denominations. It confirmed the silver standard as .903 fine. The name colombiano was changed to granadino for both gold and silver. Gold, however, did not circulate in Colombia during the 1830s; it was either used as a store of value (hoarded) or it was exported. The silver granadino of .903 fine was never minted. Instead, a decree of 5 April 1839 authorized coins of 2 and 8 reales only .666 fine.

==== Treasury notes ====
On 6 June 1838, President José Ignacio de Márquez authorized the Treasury (la Tesorería General de la República) to issue notes redeemable by bearer at sight. They were to be accepted by all tax offices. Notes were to be issued for 5, 10, 20, 25, 50, 75, 80, and 100 pesos, but this decree was revoked on 4 November 1846 by President Mosquera, and no notes were issued.

==== Coin ====
Silver .666 fine, dated 1839–1846

- peseta (R.2)
- peso (R.8), 27.020 g

=== Monetary reform of 1846–1847 ===
The 1840s found the currency still in a chaotic state. Monetary legislation perpetuated the problem by equating nominal value with intrinsic value and treating a peso .666 fine the same as a peso .903 fine. This guaranteed that Gresham's law would come into play, despite a law (1844) prohibiting the export of gold and silver coin. Customs houses accepted 16 pesos in silver as equal to a gold onza, whether the coins were .666 fine (= 245 g fine silver) or .903 fine (= 382 g fine silver). By 1846 newly minted coin had virtually disappeared from the province of Bogotá.

Monetary reform had the backing of President Tomás Cipriano de Mosquera. The first step (23 May 1846) was to permit the export of gold dust and gold bullion, subject only to a duty of 6%. The second step (2 June 1846) was to establish the silver real as the monetary unit and to adopt a uniform fineness of .900. The final step was to adopt the French decimal system (27 April 1847) and to permit French and Belgian coin to circulate. This reform rejected bimetalism in favor of a silver standard, but the following period (1847–1861) saw a continuing debate about whether silver or gold was preferable as a monetary standard.

==== Monetary law of 1846 ====
Real = 10 Décimos

The monetary law of 2 June 1846 named the silver real as the monetary unit. All silver and gold coins were to be .900 fine. Silver coins would be the peso, peseta, real, and medio. Gold coins would be the onza, cóndor, doblón, and escudo. The peseta was equal to the silver franc, the escudo to the gold napoleón (20 franc piece). There would be two coins of pure copper: a décimo de real and its half, legal tender to 2 reales. The décimo was equivalent to the French and Belgian 5 céntimos (centimes) and to the centavo (cent) of the United States. The 1846 law provided that silver coins in circulation, Colombian and Granadian, continue to be accepted by all tax offices at face value.

The chief advantages of the 1846 law were: (a) it established for the first time in Colombian legislation the monetary unit; (b) it provided for uniform fineness; and, (c) it provided for strict proportionality among the coins. Its shortcomings were: (a) it introduced a third peso, .900 fine, to circulate alongside the 1836 peso (.903 fine) and the 1839 peso (.666 fine); (b) it made the real the standard unit rather than the peso, to which people were accustomed; and (c) it did not order the immediate recoining of gold, allowing coins of two finenesses to circulate: the older Spanish, Colombian and the Granadine, all .875 fine, weighing 27.058 g, and the new onza, .900 fine, weighing 25.806 g.

==== Decimalization law of 1847 ====
Granadino = 10 Reales = 100 Centavos

The monetary law of 27 April 1847 adopted the decimal system and authorized silver coins of France, Belgium, and Sardinia to circulate at two reales per franc (the rate at which tax offices would receive them). It also provided for a silver coin of 10 reales, the granadino, and equivalent to the French écu (5 francs). Minting of .666 fine silver finally ceased in 1847, save for the cuartillo (1/4 real) authorized on 30 March 1849. Moreover, Mosquera's efforts to withdraw the macuquina succeeded, and by 1 January 1849 virtually all had been recoined (a total of 380,620 pesos of macuquinas had been withdrawn at a cost of 53,000 pesos).

==== Paper ====
On October 16, 1848, President Mosquera authorized treasury notes (billete de tesoreria). The notes were to be of two kinds, silver notes for 40, 80, 160, 200, 400, 600, and 800 reales, and gold notes for 5, 10, 25, and 50 escudos. They would eventually be redeemed, the silver notes for their face value in silver coin, the gold notes in gold escudos or in their legal equivalent in gold or in silver coin at the current rate of exchange. The notes were never issued (proofs are known).

==== Coin ====
Copper coin dated 1847–1848

- 1/2 décimo (R.1/20), 5.000 g
- décimo (R.1/10), 10.000 g

The copper coins were rejected by the public, who immediately exchanged them for silver, so they were recalled and melted down.

Silver coin dated 1847–1853
.666 fine

- cuartillo (R.1/4), 0.813 g

.900 fine

- medio (R.1/2), 1.250 g
- real (R.1), 2.500 g
- peseta (R.2), 5.000 g
- peso (R.8), 20.000 g (1847)
- granadino (R.10), 25.000 g (1847–1851)

Gold coin .900 fine dated 1848–1853

- escudo (P.2), 3.2258 g
- onza (P.16), 25.8064 g

New machinery for the mints of Bogotá and Popoyán arrived in 1848 and the first gold coins conforming to the 1846 law were put into circulation on 14 February 1849.

=== Monetary law of 1853 ===
Peso (Granadino) = 10 Décimos = 100 Centavos (silver)
Cóndor = 10 Pesos (gold)

The monetary law of 30 May 1853 abolished the real by renaming it the décimo. It changed the name granadino to peso and made it the monetary unit, worth 10 reales, older pesos .666 fine becoming 8-décimo pieces. Debts contracted prior to passage of this law were to be reduced 20% when paid with pesos rated 10 décimos (not 8). The cóndor was made equal to 10 pesos in silver. The old décimo and medio décimo de real became the centavo and medio centavo.

The 1846 law had upset people by replacing the peso with the real as the monetary unit; the 1853 law altered the notion of what constituted a peso and violated the public concept of "peso".

The 1853 law provided for a gold cóndor of 16.400 g, and its half (medio cóndor) and fifth (escudo), valued at 10, 5 and 2 pesos fuertes. This eliminated the onza and doblón of the 1846 law. (So the cóndor contained more gold than the napoleón of 50 francs, which was 16.129 g, .900 fine). This law established a silver to gold ratio of 15.244 to 1 while it was 15.5 on world markets. This undervaluation of gold lasted until the ratio was changed to 15.5 in 1857, by which time most gold coin had been exported.

==== Silver coin ====
Silver coin dated 1853–1858
.666 fine

- 1/4 real, 0.813 g

.900 fine

- 1/2 décimo, 1.250 g
- décimo, 2.500 g
- 2 décimos, 5.000 g
- peso, 25.000 g

==== Gold coin ====
Gold coin .900 fine dated 1853–1857

- cóndor (P.10), 16.400 g

=== Monetary law of 1857 ===
Peso = 10 Décimos = 100 Centavos

A law of 30 June 1857, and decree of 23 July 1857, adopted the silver peso - 25.000 g, .900 fine (identical to the "granadino" in weight, type, and form) - as the monetary unit. Sub-multiples were the dos décimos (5.000 g) and décimo (2.500 g), both .900 fine, and the cuarto de décimo, .666 fine. Gold coins would be the peso, escudo, doblón, cóndor, and doble cóndor (onza). This was the French bimetallic standard, with a ratio of 15.5, the cóndor being equal to the napoleón of 50 francs. The law gave legal tender status to French gold coin at face value.

==== Paper ====
Congress passed Colombia's first banking law on 13 June 1855 regulating banks of issue, discount, and deposit. Banks were authorized to issue notes redeemable in lawful gold or silver coin. The first paper money was issued 1857 by the State of Cundinamarca, followed in 1860 by the first national issue and in 1865 by the first private banknotes.

==== Coin ====
Gold coin .900 fine dated 1857–1858

- peso, 1.6875 g
- escudo (P.2), 3.2258 g
- doblón (P.5), 8.065 g
- cóndor (P.10), 16.129 g

== 1858–1861 Granadine Confederation ==
Peso = 10 Reales or Décimos = 100 Centavos

The Granadine Confederation (Confederación Granadina) was proclaimed 1 April 1858, adopting a new constitution on 22 May. Its brief life under President Mariano Ospina Rodríguez ended in civil war (1860–1862). The Confederation issued Colombia's first postage stamps in August 1859 in denominations of 2 1/2, 5, 10, and 20 centavos and 1 peso.

Silver dated 1859–1862 (coins minted at Bogotá are denominated in décimos, those minted at Popayán in reales)
.666 fine

- 1/4 décimo or real, 0.831 g

.900 fine

- 1/2 décimo or real, 1.250 g
- décimo, 2.500 g
- 2 reales, 5.000 g
- peso, 25.000 g

Gold .900 fine, dated 1859–1862:

- peso de oro (1/10 cóndor), 1.6129 g
- escudo (P.2), 3.2258 g
- doblón (P.5), 8.064 g
- cóndor (P.10), 16.129 g
- onza (P.20), 32.258 g

== 1861–1862 United States of New Granada ==
Peso = 10 Décimos = 100 Centavos

General Tomás Cipriano de Mosquera captured Bogotá on 18 June 1861 and declared himself provisional president of the United States of New Granada (Estados Unidos de Nueva Granada). The internal instability resulted in customs houses accepting Bank of England notes and the British sovereign as equal to 5 pesos, between 1861 and 1863. As a result of the 1860 civil war, the period 1861–1871, known as the first paper money period, saw treasury notes made obligatory tender at par with coin. Postage stamps appeared in 1861 in denominations of 2 1/2, 5, 10, and 20 centavos and 1 peso.

=== Paper ===
On 24 August 1861, General Mosquera authorized the Treasury (Tesoreria General de los Estados Unidos de Nueva Granada) to issue notes (billetes de tesoreria) in denominations of 1, 2, 3, 10, 20, 50, and 100 pesos. A little over one million pesos were issued. These notes were accepted at face value for 50% of import taxes, 100% of export taxes, or 60% of the value of salt produced by the state monopoly. They were legal tender for all state creditors and for individuals who had declared in writing their willingness to receive them. The public avoided the notes, so their acceptance was made obligatory (8 October 1861). A decree of 27 January 1862 authorized the exchange of treasury notes for silver coin, .666 fine, and guaranteed their withdrawal within one year. When the Supreme Court ruled that the notes were not obligatory on individuals for debts contracted before 24 August 1861, President Mosquera passed a decree (11 August 1862) making the notes obligatory for individuals, regardless of the origin and date of a debt.

=== Coin ===
Silver .900 fine, dated 1861, inscribed ESTADOS UNIDOS DE NUEVA GRANADA

- décimo, 2.500 g
- peso, 25.000 g

== Monetary laws of 1863–1867 (United States of Colombia) ==
=== Monetary laws of 1863–1864 ===
The country's name changed to United States of Colombia (Estados Unidos de Colombia) in 1862, and postage stamps were issued for 5, 10, 20, and 50 centavos and for 1 peso. The 15 April 1863 Convención de Rionegro ordered public offices to continue accepting French, Belgian, and Italian silver coin of the Colombian standard at 20 centavos per franc, and prohibited the import of coin less than .900 fine. Public offices were authorized to accept silver coins .666 fine in payment of taxes and fees until 1 September 1864. These coins were no longer legal tender between individuals, and they were not accepted in the State of Panamá. The states of Boyacá and Santander immediately prohibited circulation of coin .666 fine, so that such coin flowed into Cundinamarca, where it was still legal tender for public debts. There was considerable speculation in these coins in Bogotá, where they came to form the bulk of circulation. Consequently, a law of 7 April 1864 restored legal tender status, in payment of public debts, to all coin less than .900 fine (but not in the State of Panamá) and budgeted 80,000 pesos to re-coin .666 fine silver (for which purpose a third mint opened at Medellín).

In 1864 the government planned to establish a national bank, but this did not work out. So the Banking Law of 6 May 1865 provided for a plurality of banks of issue. The first private banknotes were issued by Perez y Planas in 1865. In 1866, however, at the insistence of General Mosquera, Congress abandoned the theory of plurality of issue and again authorized the government to establish a national bank. Gen Mosquera sanctioned (4 July 1866) the issue of Treasury notes, legal tender for all public debts except import dues. The government was authorized to exchange old Granadine and Colombian coins .666 fine for Treasury notes. Negotiations were conducted with Robinson & Fleming of London for "El Banco de los Estados Unidos de Colombia" to issue legal tender notes, with a minimum denomination of 5 pesos.

=== Monetary Law of 1867 ===
Peso = 10 Décimos = 100 Centavos
Cóndor = 10 pesos (gold or silver)

By decree of 2 May 1867 President Mosquera made Treasury notes a forced tender, making them equivalent to a national monetary unit. On 12 June he further decreed the obligatory acceptance in public and private transactions of all coins .900, .835, and .666 fine minted by the former Republic of Colombia and by New Granada.

The monetary law of 24 October 1867 annulled all previous monetary legislation and defined the national coinage as silver, the monetary unit being the peso of 25.000 g .900 fine. Other silver coins would be the medio peso, dos décimos, and décimo, all .835 fine; and the medio décimo and cuarto de décimo, both .666 fine. The 2, 1, and 1/2 décimo coins were legal tender only to 10 pesos, but the 1/2 peso, only .835 fine, was unlimited legal tender. This would become a problem when the price of silver began falling in 1873. The gold cóndor was defined equal to 10 pesos in gold or silver. Copper was made legal tender to 2 décimos among individuals, but was received without limit by public offices. The law also made old Colombian coins legal tender at face value, and it prohibited the import of any silver coin less than .835 fine or any gold coin less than .900 fine. Gold and silver coin of France, Belgium, Italy, and Switzerland was accepted by public offices.

=== Paper ===
==== Treasury notes ====
In 1863 the Treasury issued notes for 5, 10, and 20 centavos and 1, 2, 5, 10, 20, and 50 pesos, adding a 3 peso note in 1869.

==== State notes ====
The State of Panama issued notes between 1867 and 1880.

==== Bank notes ====
A branch of the London, México and South América Bank was established in 1864 and was granted the right of issue in 1865.

=== Coin ===
Silver coin of the 1863 standard
.666 fine

- 1/4 décimo, 0.813 g (1863–1867)

.900 fine

- 1/2 décimo, 1.250 g (1863–1865)
- décimo, 2.500 g (1866–1867)
- 2 décimos, 5.000 g (1865)
- un peso, 25.000 g (1862–1871)

Silver coin of the modified 1867 standard
.666 fine

- 1/4 décimo, 0.625 g (1868–1888)
- 1/2 décimo, 1.250 g (1867–1878)

.835 fine

- décimo, 2.500 g (1866–1874)
- 2 décimos, 5.000 g (1866–1867)
- medio peso (5 décimos), 12.500 g (1868–1886)

Gold coin .900 fine dated 1862–1878

- décimo de cóndor (peso), 1.6129 g
- quinto de cóndor (P.2), 3.2258 g
- medio cóndor (P.5), 8.064 g
- cóndor (P.10), 16.129 g
- doble cóndor (P.20), 32.258 g

== 1871–1880 Peso (silver standard) ==
Peso = 100 Centavos

The monetary law of 9 June 1871 put the currency on the silver standard of the Latin Monetary Union system, the Colombian peso of 22.500 g fine silver being equal to 5 francs. It prohibited minting of coin .666 fine. Medios and cuartillos were to be minted .835 fine and the half peso was made .900 fine. The peso de oro was set at 1.612 g .900 fine (equal to the décimo de cóndor of 1867 and the peso of 1857). Copper was made legal tender to 50 centavos per transaction, altered in 1872 to 50 centavos for every 50 pesos in gold or silver (equivalent to 1% per transaction). A law of May 5, 1872 divided the peso de oro into 100 centavos. The fall in the world price of silver from 1872 on broke the 15.5 ratio. Gold coin was undervalued in Colombia and tended to disappear from circulation.

=== Paper ===
==== State notes ====
Currency notes were issued in the 1870s and 1880s by the states of Cundinamarca, Bolivar, and Cauca.

==== Bank notes ====
The first private Colombian bank, Banco de Bogotá, was established 15 November 1870 and began operations in 1871 with a capital of $235,000. In 1875 it had a note circulation of $776,935 in denominations of 5, 10, 50, and 100 pesos. It was followed by Banco de Antioquia and Banco Santander in 1872, Banco de Barranquilla and Banco del Cauca in 1873, Banco de Bolívar and Banco Mercantil in 1874, and by Banco de Colombia in 1875.

The Fiscal Code of 1873 summed up all of the monetary legislation then in force, and a modification of banking regulations led to numerous banks of issue. By 1886 some 36 private banks of issue had been founded, but they played a small part in note circulation because of the huge volume of government paper money.

=== Coin ===
Silver .666 fine, 1872–1885

- 2½c, 0.625 g (1872–1881)
- 5c, 1.230 g (1872–1885)

silver .835 fine, 1872–1886

- 10c, 2.500 g (1872–1885)
- 20c, 5.000 g (1874–1885)
- 50c, 12.500 g (1872–1886)

== 1880–1886 Peso (gold standard) ==
Due to the falling price of silver, Colombia adopted the gold standard in 1880, with the peso equal to 1451.610 mg Au (= 5 francs). The Núñez government raised a loan of 2.5 million pesos in New York (secured by the Panamá Railway) to establish Banco Nacional, which began operations in January 1881.

A decree of 24 March 1885 authorized coins of nickel and 0.500 silver, and authorized Banco Nacional to issue notes for 10 & 20 centavos. The cost of the civil war of 1885 was covered by paper money, circulation increasing by 89%. Banco Nacional was unable to cover its notes in gold coin, but the Government compromised on suspension by paying notes in silver with the funds received from negotiating the Panama Canal.

=== Paper ===
El Banco Nacional de los Estados Unidos de Colombia was responsible for the national note issue 1880–1885. In 1881 it released notes for 1, 5, 10, 20, 50, and 100 pesos payable in current coin (moneda corriente). Notes for 20 and 50 centavos appeared in 1882, and new designs for 10 and 20 centavos and 1, 50, and 100 pesos in 1885.

=== Coin ===
Silver .500 fine, 1885–1886

- 10c, 2.500 g
- 20c, 5.000 g
- 50c, 12.500 g

Gold .666 fine, 1885–1886

- escudo (P.2), 3.2258 g
- doblón (P.5), 8.0645 g
- cóndor (P.10), 16.129 g

== 1886–1905 Peso billete (paper peso) (Republic of Colombia) ==
Decree 104 of 19 January 1886 adopted as the monetary unit the one peso note of Banco Nacional, effective 1 May. Decree 448 of 2 August 1886 equated the peso note (billete de a peso) of Banco Nacional to silver coin .835 fine. The United States of Colombia became the Republic of Colombia 5 August 1886. The gold standard was formally suspended 20 December 1886.

In 1893 it was learned that secret note issues had pushed circulation past 12 million pesos back in 1889, and Congress decided to liquidate Banco Nacional. But the bank's existence was extended to 1 January 1896, while it issued another 5 million pesos to cover the costs of the 1895 civil war. The end of the bank was not, however, the end of forced paper. In 1898–1899 the Government put $22 million in notes of Banco Nacional into circulation (despite the fact that the bank no longer existed).

The period 1899–1903 witnessed revolution, civil war (the Thousand Days War of 1899–1902), inflation, and depreciation. There were numerous note issues of various kinds. Then calm slowly returned. A law of 25 October 1903 prohibited new paper money issues, permitted payment in gold to be stipulated in contracts, and reintroduced the gold peso (peso oro), equal to 100 paper pesos, effective 1 January 1904. Outstanding notes were absorbed by auction sales of gold.

=== Paper ===
El Banco Nacional de la República de Colombia issued notes in 1886 for 50 centavos and 1, 5, and 10 pesos. Notes of a new design appeared in 1888 for 10 centavos and 1, 5, 10, 50, and 100 pesos, with 25 and 1000 added in 1895.

During the civil war the government issued 28 new Banco Nacional note types and overprinted about 48 different private banknotes for circulation.

=== Coin ===
Copper-nickel coin dated 1886–1902

- 2½c (1900, 1902)
- 5c (1886–1888)

Silver .666 fine dated 1897 or 1902

- 5c, 1.250 g (1902)
- 10c, 2.500 g (1897)
- 20c, 5.000 g (1897)

Silver .500 fine dated 1887–1888

- 50c

Silver .835 fine dated 1889–1908

- 50c

== 1905–1914 Peso oro (gold standard) ==
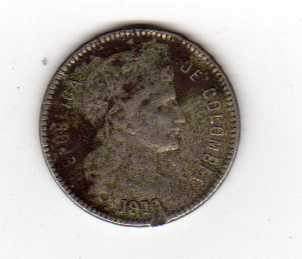
Obverse of nickel 1914 "paper money" peso

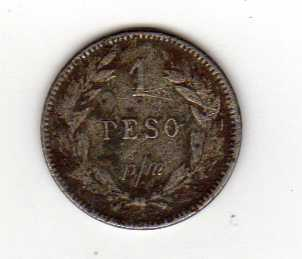
Reverse of 1914 peso, showing "p/m" for papel moneda (paper money)

Peso oro = 100 Centavos
Conversion: 1 peso oro = 100 paper pesos

The conversion of paper into gold began 18 May 1905, at 100 paper pesos for one gold peso, but proceeded very slowly. A full return to the gold standard was finally achieved 12 June 1907. The gold libra, worth 5 pesos, was identical to the sovereign, the gold peso being equal to 1464.480 mg fine gold or 4s sterling. Gold par was 5.00 per pound sterling and 1.027 per US dollar. A constitutional amendment prohibited further government issues of fiat currency after 1909.

=== Paper ===
The government issued currency notes in 1904 for 1, 2, 5, 10, 25, 50, and 100 pesos, with a 1000 note added in 1908.

=== Coin ===
Nickel coins (pesos papel moneda):

- $1 p/m (1907, 1910, 1911, 1912, 1913, 1914, 1916)
- $2 p/m (1907, 1910, 1914)
- $5 p/m (1907, 1909, 1912, 1913, 1914)

Gold .916 fine:

- half libra (P. 2.50), 3.994 g (0.018 million 1913)
- libra (P. 5), 7.988 g (0.017 million 1913, 0.043 million 1917, 0.423 million 1918, 2.181 million 1919)
- double libra (P. 10), 15.976 g

== 1914–1923 Peso oro (inconvertible paper) ==
The gold standard was suspended in August 1914. World War I had less effect on the Colombian peso than on most other South American currencies. A slight depreciation lasted into 1915, followed by a return to par in 1916. Poor harvests in 1917 caused a slight drop in the exchange rate, but from 1918 the demand for Colombian exports combined with a forced reduction in imports resulted in peso appreciation. In 1919 US$100 could be bought for 90.50 pesos (par being 103). The situation changed completely in 1920 as demand for and prices of Colombian exports fell, while imports increased. Exchange on New York reached bottom in October 1920 at 122 pesos for US$100. Steady improvement followed.

The Junta de Conversión (exchange council) was instructed to exchange all paper money in circulation for gold pesos. This operation was completed by the end of 1919, when only 218,000 paper pesos remained outstanding. Junta de Conversión issued notes for 1, 2, 5, 10, 50, and 100 pesos "payable in conformity with legislation".

== 1923–1931 Peso oro (gold exchange standard) ==
The monetary reform of 11 July 1923 established a gold exchange standard at the old parity on 23 July 1923. The reform had the backing of the noted financial expert Edwin W. Kemmerer, who had been invited to advise on the US indemnity of $25 million for the loss of Panama.

El Banco de la República was also established on 11 July 1923. It began operations well ahead of schedule due to the panic caused by the failure of Banco Lopez, overprinting unissued notes of Casa de Moneda de Medellin for 2 1/2, 5, 10, and 20 pesos. It soon issued a regular series for 1, 2, 5, 10, 50, 100, and 500 pesos.

== Since 1931 Peso (Peso oro) ==
The gold exchange standard was abandoned de facto on 21 September 1931, when restrictions were placed on foreign exchange and de jure on 24 November 1931. The peso was pegged to the dollar at 1.05/US$1. Several adjustments were made following the rise of the dollar, and in 1935 the exchange rate settled at 1.75 pesos per US$1. Colombia abandoned a fixed exchange rate in 1937, but the free rate kept close to 1.75/US$1.

The Colombian peso's parity was registered with the International Monetary Fund on 18 December 1946 at 1.75 pesos to the US dollar, equal to 507.816 mg fine gold. This was adjusted to 1.95/US$1 on December 17, 1948, and to 2.50/US$1 on March 20, 1951. Colombia abandoned a fixed IMF parity and introduced a fluctuating free market rate on 13 May 1955, set initially at 4.17 per US dollar. There was steady deterioration of the exchange rate; an attempt to hold it at 13.50 per US dollar in 1966 failed. The annual average fell to 31.20 per dollar in 1975, 47.28 per in 1980, 142.31 per in 1985, 502.26 per in 1990, and 988 per in 1995.
