= Moby Dick Coin =

Ecuadorian doubloon described in Moby Dick

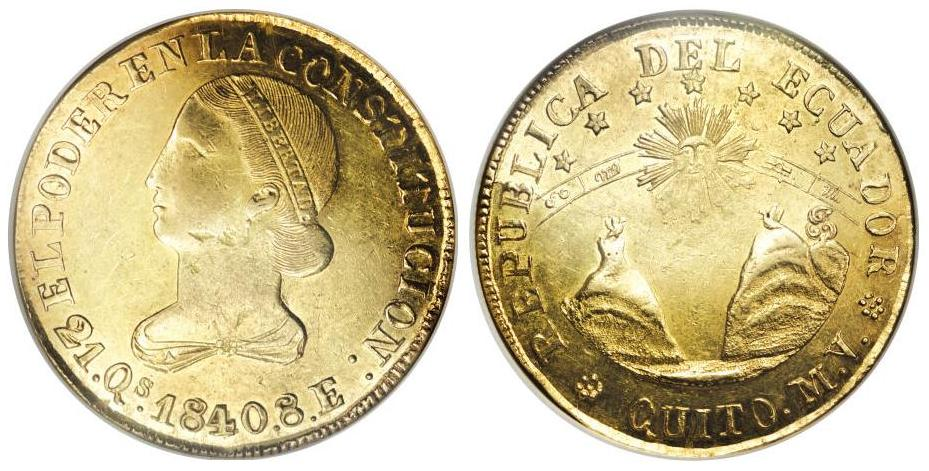
Moby Dick Coin

The "Moby Dick Coin" was a 19th century Ecuadorian coin which was referenced in the novel Moby-Dick. Known in the numismatic world as a "Moby Dick Coin", the Ecuadorian 8 Escudos doubloon, minted in Quito, Ecuador, between 1838 and 1843, is the one ounce of gold "sixteen dollar piece" Captain Ahab nails to the mast of the Pequod, promising it to the first man who "raises" Moby-Dick. The coin is first mentioned in Herman Melville's 1851 novel Moby-Dick, in Chapter 36 "The Quarter Deck" and later at length in Chapter 99 "The Doubloon". It is often mistaken as a Spanish doubloon, but this coin was not struck by the Spanish crown or endorsed by the Spanish government. The Moby Dick coin was minted in the Republic of Ecuador, at the Quito mint, many years after its independence from Spain.

Now those noble golden coins of South America are as medals of the sun and tropic token-pieces. Here palms, alpacas, and volcanoes; sun’s disks and stars, ecliptics, horns-of-plenty, and rich banners waving, are in luxuriant profusion stamped; so that the precious gold seems almost to derive an added preciousness and enhancing glories, by passing through those fancy mints, so Spanishly poetic. It so chanced that the doubloon of the Pequod was a most wealthy example of these things. On its round border it bore the letters, Republica del Ecuador: Quito. So this bright coin came from a country planted in the middle of the world, and beneath the great equator, and named after it; and it had been cast midway up the Andes, in the unwaning clime that knows no autumn. Zoned by those letters you saw the likeness of three Andes’ summits; from one a flame; a tower on another; on the third a crowing cock; while arching over all was a segment of the partitioned zodiac, the signs all marked with their usual cabalistics, and the keystone sun entering the equinoctial point at Libra.

— Moby-Dick, chapter 99

== In pop culture ==
The coin plays a central role in Season 1, Episode 4 of Netflix's Carmen Sandiego in 2019.
