= Peso fuerte =

Peso fuerte may refer to:

- Argentine peso fuerte, convertible currency used by Argentina from 1826 to 1881 alongside the peso papel
- Ecuadoran peso fuerte, 1846–1856
- Philippine peso fuerte, currency of the Spanish East Indies during the later Spanish colonial period
- Uruguayan peso fuerte, used from 1856 to 1863
- Venezuelan peso fuerte, 1830–1848
