= Casa Arenas Loayza =

Building in Lima, Peru

Coordinates: 12.0463°S 77.0292°W

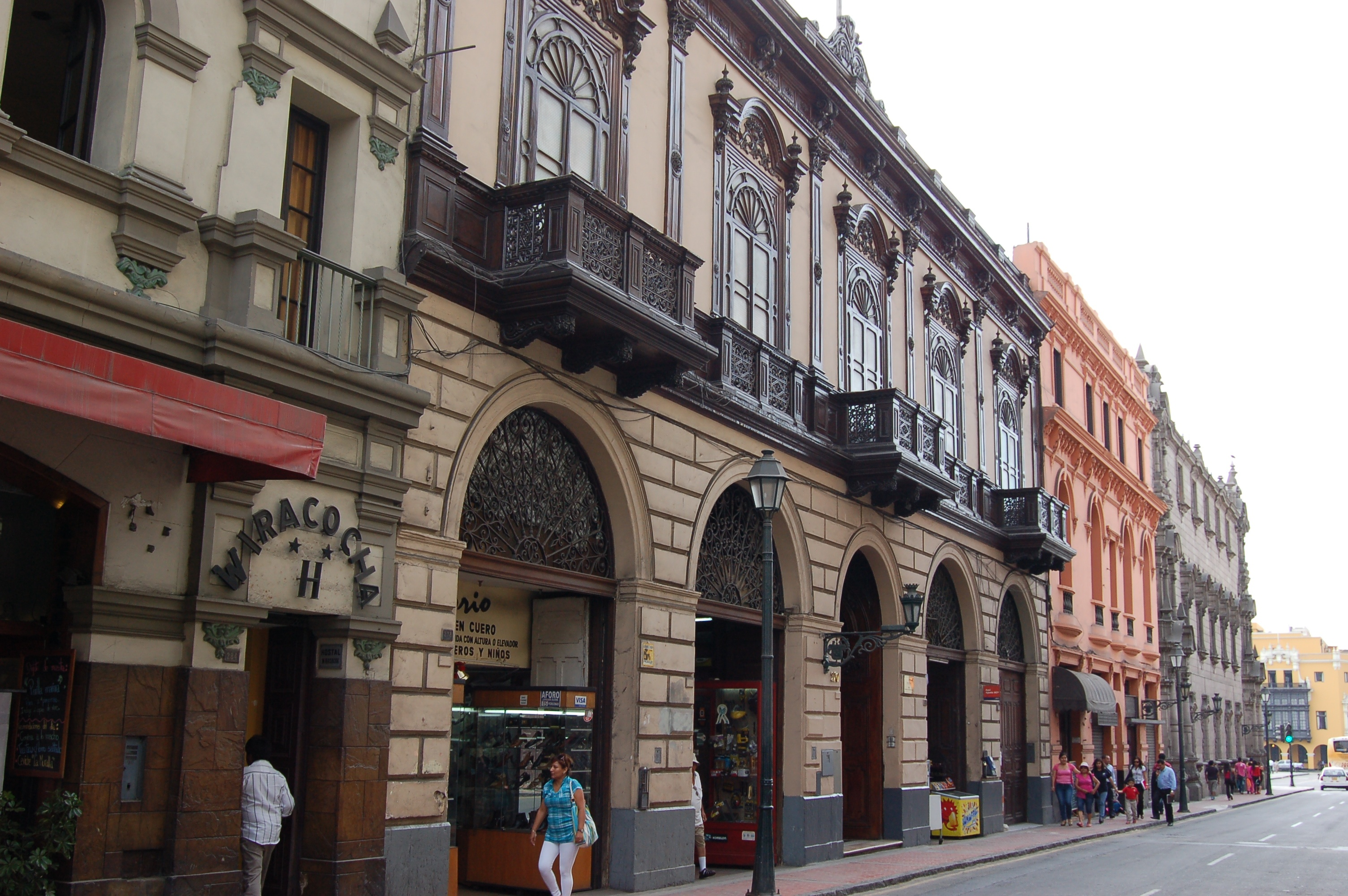

General information
- Architectural style: Neo-Renaissance, Eclectic
- Address: Jirón Junín 270
- Year(s) built: 1886

Technical details
- Floor count: 2

The Casa Arenas Loayza is a historic residence in the Cercado de Lima, Peru. Located in the historic centre of Lima, it forms part of the Cultural heritage of Peru. It is located a block away from the Government Palace.

== History ==
In this two-level building the rooms are on the upper floor. The ground floor is mostly intended for longitudinal shops. The first floor is padded and has five openings with semicircular arches. The second floor has three short projecting balconies and two parapet balconies, which are distinguished from the traditional balconies of Lima, which are usually made of wood and closed.

Its façade is the Italian neo-Renaissance style, with a tendency towards eclecticism. There are neo-baroque elements in the balconies, jambs, screens and pilaster shafts, while the neo-Gothic style is reflected in the frieze and its corbels that support the cornice and roof railing.

Unlike many other similar residences from the mid-19th century, its plan does not develop around a central patio or in general around any axis. Its interior is decorated with plasterwork with a floral motif.
