= Doubloon =

Two-escudo or 32-real gold coin

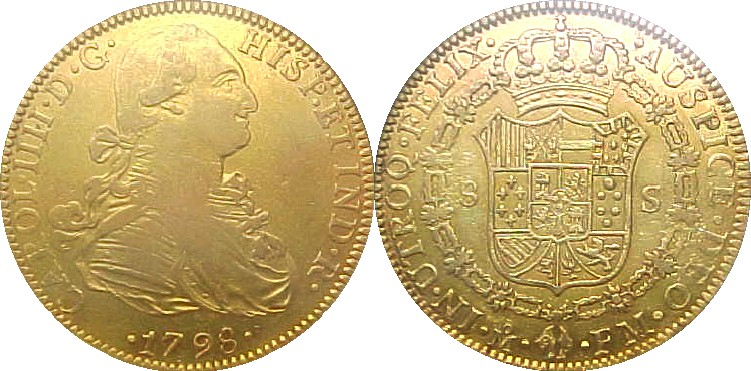
Spanish 4-doubloon, or doubloon of 8 escudos, stamped as minted in Mexico city mint in 1798. Obverse: Carol.IIII.D.G. Hisp.et Ind.R. Reverse:.in.utroq.felix. .auspice.deo.fm.

The doubloon (from Spanish doblón, or "double", i.e. double escudo) was a two-escudo gold coin worth approximately four Spanish dollars or 32 reales, and weighing 6.766 grams (0.218 troy ounce) of 22-karat gold (or 0.917 fine; hence 6.2 g fine gold). Doubloons were minted in Spain and the viceroyalties of New Spain, Peru, and New Granada (modern-day Colombia, Ecuador, Panama, and Venezuela). As the Spanish escudo (3.1 g fine gold) succeeded the heavier gold excelente (or ducado, ducat, 3.48 g) as the standard Spanish gold coin, the doubloon therefore succeeded the doble excelente or double-ducat denomination.

In modern times, the doubloon is remembered due in large part to the influence of historical fiction about piracy, in which gold coins were prime booty.

== History ==
Spanish American gold coins were minted in one-half, one, two, four, and eight escudo denominations, with each escudo worth around two Spanish dollars or $2. The two-escudo (or $4 coin) was the "doubloon" or "pistole", and the large eight-escudo (or $16) was a "quadruple pistole".

English nomenclature was confusing, though, since the $8 "double pistole" was the doubloon in English usage, while the $16 "quadruple pistole" was the doubloon in American colonial usage. This was disambiguated in references by calling the $4 the common doubloon or simply doubloon, the $8 the doubloon of four (escudos), and the $16 the doubloon of eight. Spanish America did the same (see es:doblón, Brasher doubloon).

After the War of 1812, doubloons of eight were valued in Nova Scotia at the rate of £4 and became the dominant coin there.

Doubloons, when exchanged for $4 or 32 reales in silver, traded at a high gold-silver ratio of 16 (since each real contained 3.833 g of 0.917 silver). Since the prevailing ratio in Europe was 15 in most of the 18th century, doubloons occasionally traded at a discount to this amount, at 30–32 reales.

In Spain, doubloons were current for $4 (four duros, or 80 reales de vellón) up to the middle of the 19th century. Isabella II of Spain switched to an escudo-based coinage with decimal reales in 1859, and replaced the 6.77-gram doblón with a new heavier doblón worth $5 (five duros, or 100 reales) and weighing 8.3771 grams (0.268 troy ounces). The last Spanish doubloons (showing the denomination as 80 reales) were minted in 1849. After their independence, the former Spanish Viceroyalties of Mexico, Peru and New Granada continued to mint doubloons.

== In other countries ==
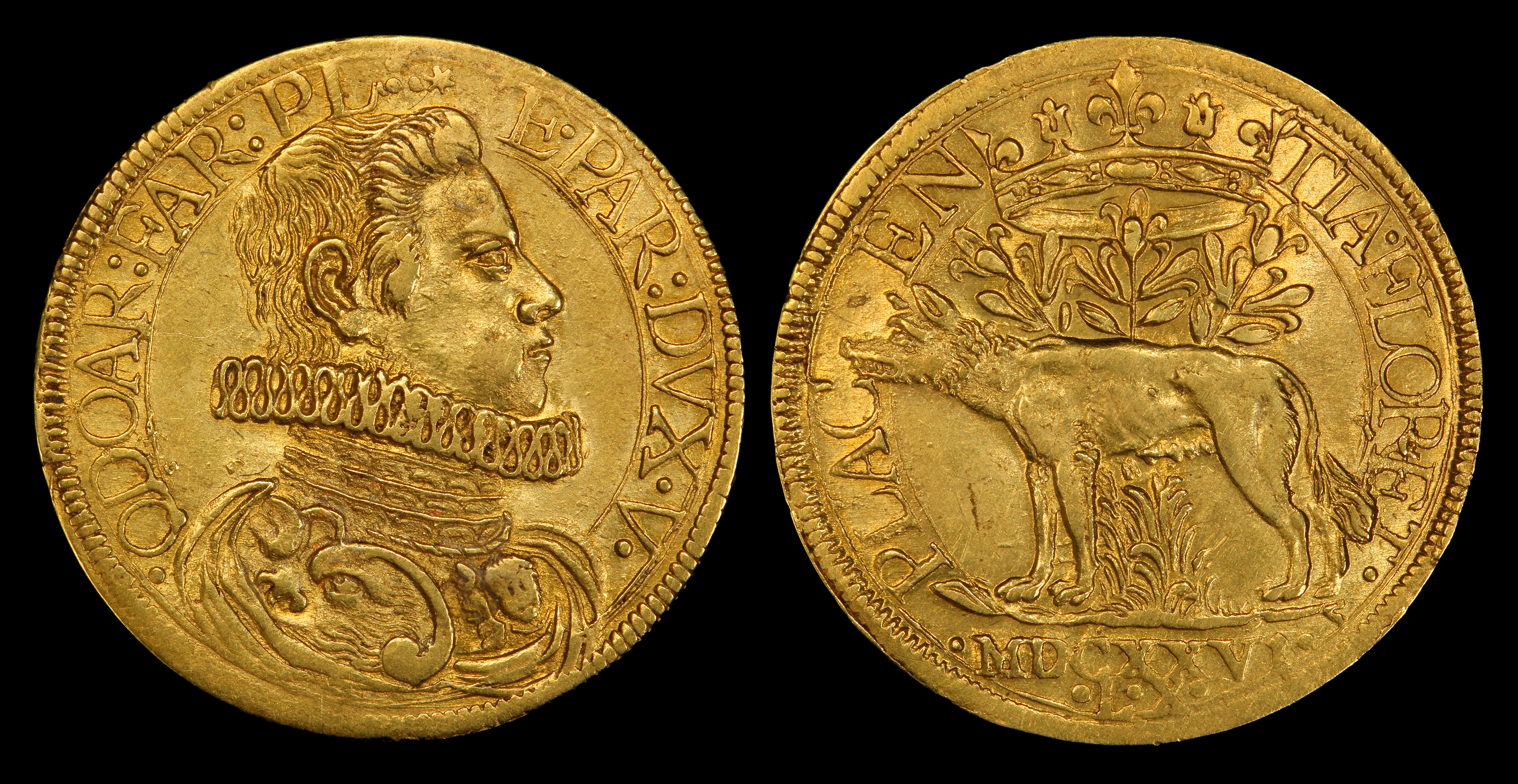
Italian States, Piacenza, 2 Doppie (1626), depicting Odoardo Farnese, Duke of Parma

Doubloons have also been minted in Portuguese colonies, where they went by the name dobrão, with the same meaning. The São Tomé and Príncipe dobra is the only extant currency with a name meaning "doubloon".

In Europe, the doubloon became the model for several other gold coins, including the French Louis d'or, the Italian doppia, the Swiss duplone, the Northern German pistole, and the Prussian Friedrich d'or.

== See also ==
- Brasher Doubloon
- Moby Dick Coin
- Spanish dollar, also known as a piece of eight
