= Jirón Junín =

Street in Lima, Peru

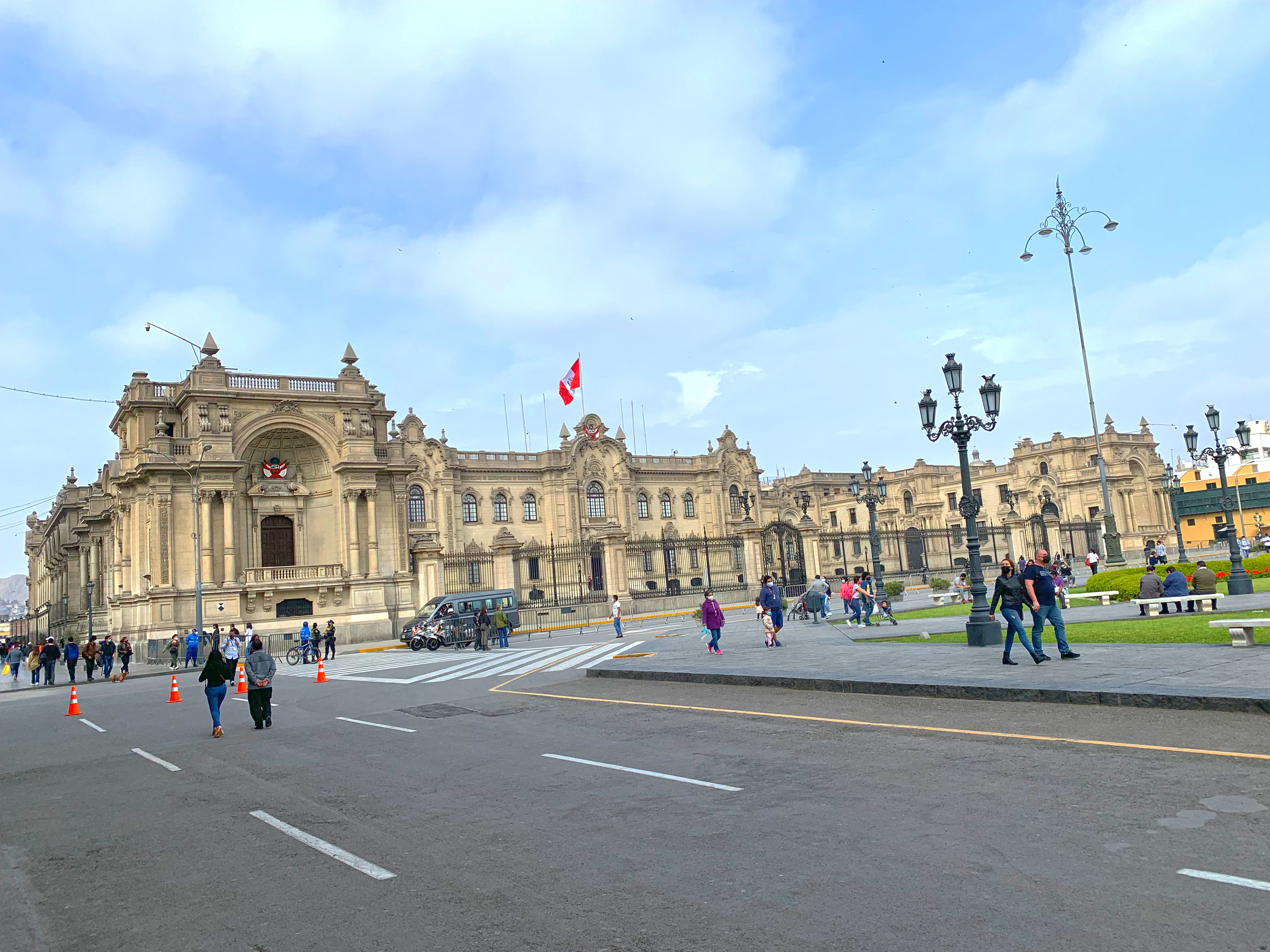
- The street and the Government Palace, seen from the Jirón de la Unión
- Part of: Damero de Pizarro
- Namesake: Department of Junín
- From: Jirón de la Unión
- Major junctions: Jirón Carabaya, Jirón Lampa, Jirón Azángaro, Abancay Avenue, Sebastián Lorente Avenue, Miguel Grau Avenue
- To: Nicolás Ayllón Avenue

Construction
- Completion: 1535

Jirón Junín is a major street in the Damero de Pizarro, located in the historic centre of Lima, Peru. The street starts at its intersection with the Jirón de la Unión and continues for 19 blocks until it reaches Nicolás Ayllón Avenue.

== History ==
The road that today constitutes the street already existed in pre-Hispanic times. Under Francisco Pizarro, it was drawn as the camino del Cercado when he founded the city of Lima on January 18, 1535. In its first block, to the south, the extension corresponding to the Plaza de Armas was arranged and, to the north, the land corresponding to the home of Pizarro himself and which was later the residence of the viceroys and Presidents of the country.

At the beginning of the 17th century, the viceroy of Peru Juan de Mendoza y Luna, consented to the creation of the Cajones de Ribera in the first block of this road (Calle de Ribera). These boxes would be occupied by the fruit sellers and peddlers who were located in the Plaza Mayor until 1885. Since that century, in the third block (San José street), the first Central Post office building was established, which would later be moved to the first block. block of the jirón Conde de Superunda. Finally, on a street perpendicular to block six (Charity St.) the premises of the University of San Marcos were located.

In 1671 the Carmen Hospital was built in the last block of this road near the Walls of Lima. This hospital, run by the Bethlehemites, was ruined in 1687 so it was moved to a neighbouring plot outside the walls. Later this hospital would be transformed into a military establishment that was known as Barbones Barracks due to the nickname that the Bethlemites had for their long beards. Throughout the 17th century, several convents were built on this road, such as the Monasterio del Carmen and the Monasterio de las Descalzas.

During the 19th century, this street saw the birth of the Congress of the Republic in 1822 and the establishment of the Senate Building in the old premises of the Tribunal of the Inquisition. In 1859 the monument to Simón Bolívar was erected.

In 1862, when a new urban nomenclature was adopted, the road was named jirón Junín, after the department of Junín. Prior to this renaming, each block (cuadra) had a unique name:

- Block 1: Ribera, for being next to the Government Palace.
- Block 2: Arzobispo, after the Archbishop's Palace of Lima. The Casa Arenas Loayza was built on this street in 1886.
- Block 3: San José, after the noble family that lived there.
- Block 4: Zárate, after Pedro Ortiz de Zárate y Luyando, who lived there in the 17th century.
- Block 5: Inquisición, after the Tribunal of the Holy Office of the Inquisition, located there.
- Block 6: Caridad, after the church of the same name (Santa María de la Caridad), built there in the 17th century.
- Block 7: Moneda, after the National Mint of Peru, located there.
- Block 8: Descalzas, after the church and monastery (Descalzas de San José) located there.
- Block 9: Peña Horadada, after a stone located in the corner with the jirón Cangallo.
- Block 10: Carmen Bajo, after the church of the same name.
- Block 11: Carmen Alto, after its higher elevation in comparison to the previous block.
- Block 12: Mascarón del Prado, after an establishment of the time.
- Block 13: Prado, after the quinta of the same name.
- Block 14: Barbones, after the Carmine Hospital for Indians, under the direction of the Barbones, so-called for their long beards.

The street once housed, in its corner with the jirón Lampa (formerly Arzobispo and Santa Apolonia streets), the finca of Arturo López Jirón, a two-storey building which served mostly commercial purposes, having a long list of owners.

In 1886, the Casa Arenas Loayza was built at number 270, with an eclectic style. In the 20th century the street saw the construction of large buildings and public spaces. Thus, in 1922 the current building of the Archbishop's Palace of Lima was built, in 1938 the Government Palace of Peru and the Legislative Palace of Peru, in 1947 the widening of Abancay Avenue and of the Plaza Bolívar took place.

On June 3, 1989, a bus transporting members of the Hussars of Junín from the Barbones Barracks towards the Government Palace was attacked by a Shining Path member with an explosive on the 11th block of the street, near the Virgen del Carmen Church. 7 people died and sixteen people—sixteen soldiers and six civilians—were injured. One of the terrorists involved was injured by a shot fired by John Ugarte Valdivia of the Technical Police, who was killed after being shot in the head. The perpetrators then escaped in a white car parked in the corner with the jirón Huánuco.

== See also ==
- Historic Centre of Lima
