= Spanish escudo =

Former Spanish currency in use from 1535–1833 and 1864–1869

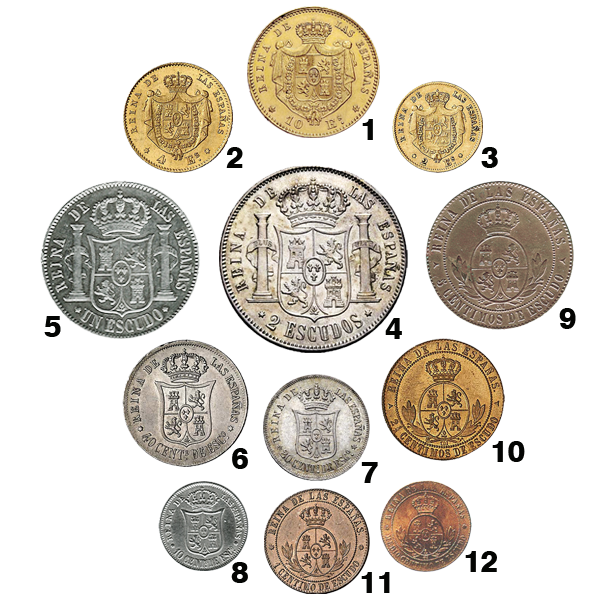
Coins of Spanish Escudos (different denominations)

The escudo was either of two distinct Spanish currency denominations.

== Gold escudo ==
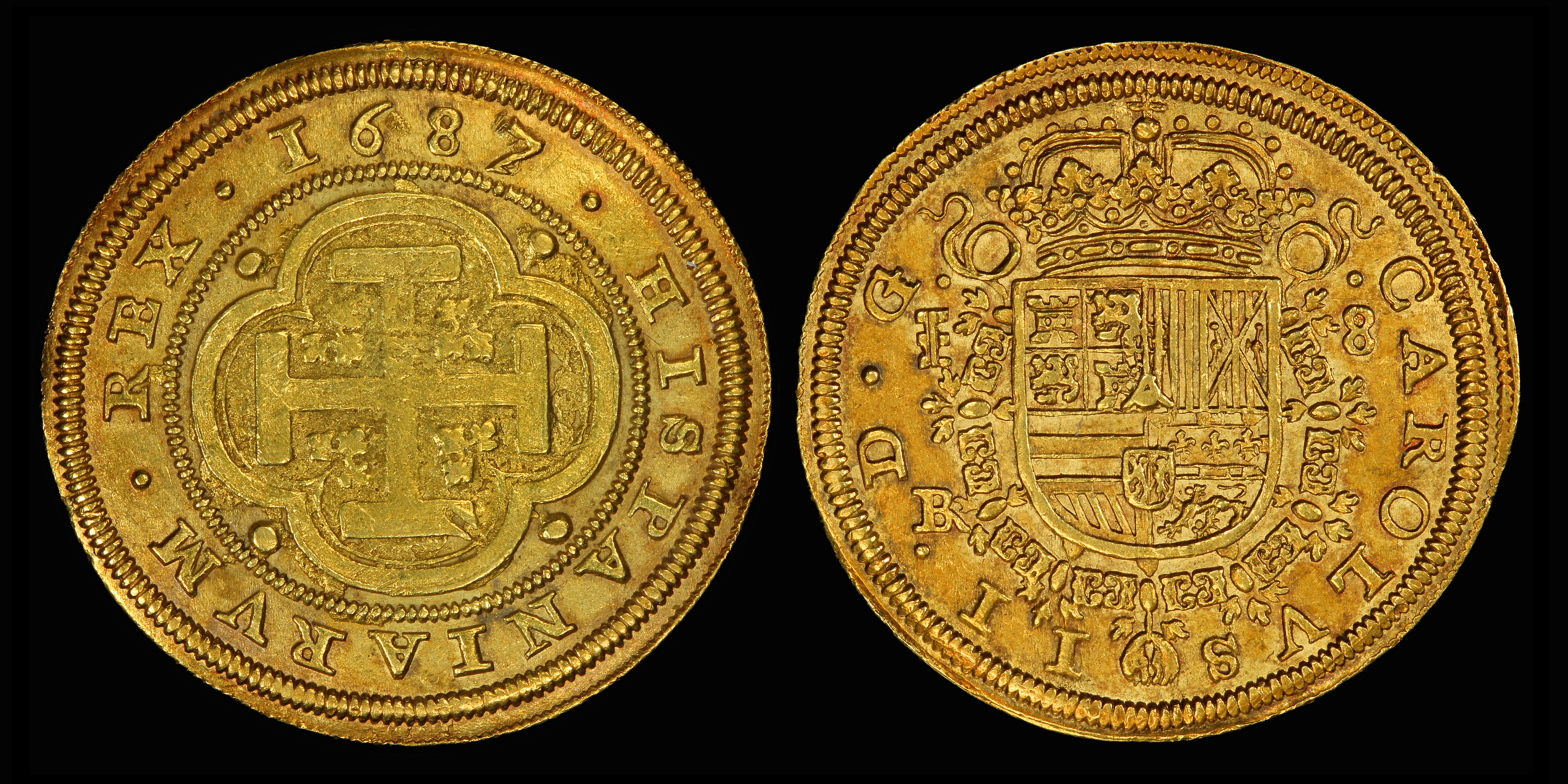
Eight Spanish Escudos (1687)

The first escudo was a gold coin introduced in 1535/1537, with coins denominated in escudos issued until 1833. It was initially worth 16 reales. When different reales were introduced, the escudo became worth 16 reales de plata in 1642, then 16 reales de plata fuerte or 40 reales de vellón from 1737.

=== Coins ===
Gold coins were issued in denominations of 1/2, 1, 2, 4 and 8 escudos, with the 2 escudos coin known as the doubloon. Between 1809 and 1849, coins denominated as 80, 160 and 320 reales (de vellon) were issued, equivalent, in gold content and value, to the 2, 4 and 8 escudo coins. Most were minted in Madrid, marked with a superscripted M or in Seville bearing an S below and left of the Royal Coat of Arms. The mintmaster's initials appeared on the opposite side.

== Silver escudo ==
The second escudo was the currency of Spain between 1864 and 1869. It was subdivided into 100 céntimos de escudo. The escudo replaced the real at a rate of 10 reales = 1 escudo. It was itself replaced by the peseta, at a rate of 2 1/2 pesetas = 1 escudo, when Spain joined the Latin Monetary Union. The later silver escudo was worth one quarter of the earlier, gold escudo.

=== Coins ===
Copper coins were issued in denominations of 1/2, 1, 2 1/2 and 5 céntimos; silver coins of 10, 20 and 40 céntimos, 1 and 2 escudos; and gold coins of 2, 4 and 10 escudos. The 1 escudo was introduced in 1864, followed by the other silver and gold coins in 1865 and the copper coins in 1866. All the coins were minted until 1868, with 10 escudos also minted in 1873 during the First Republic.

== See also ==
- Portuguese escudo
