= Currency of Ecuador =

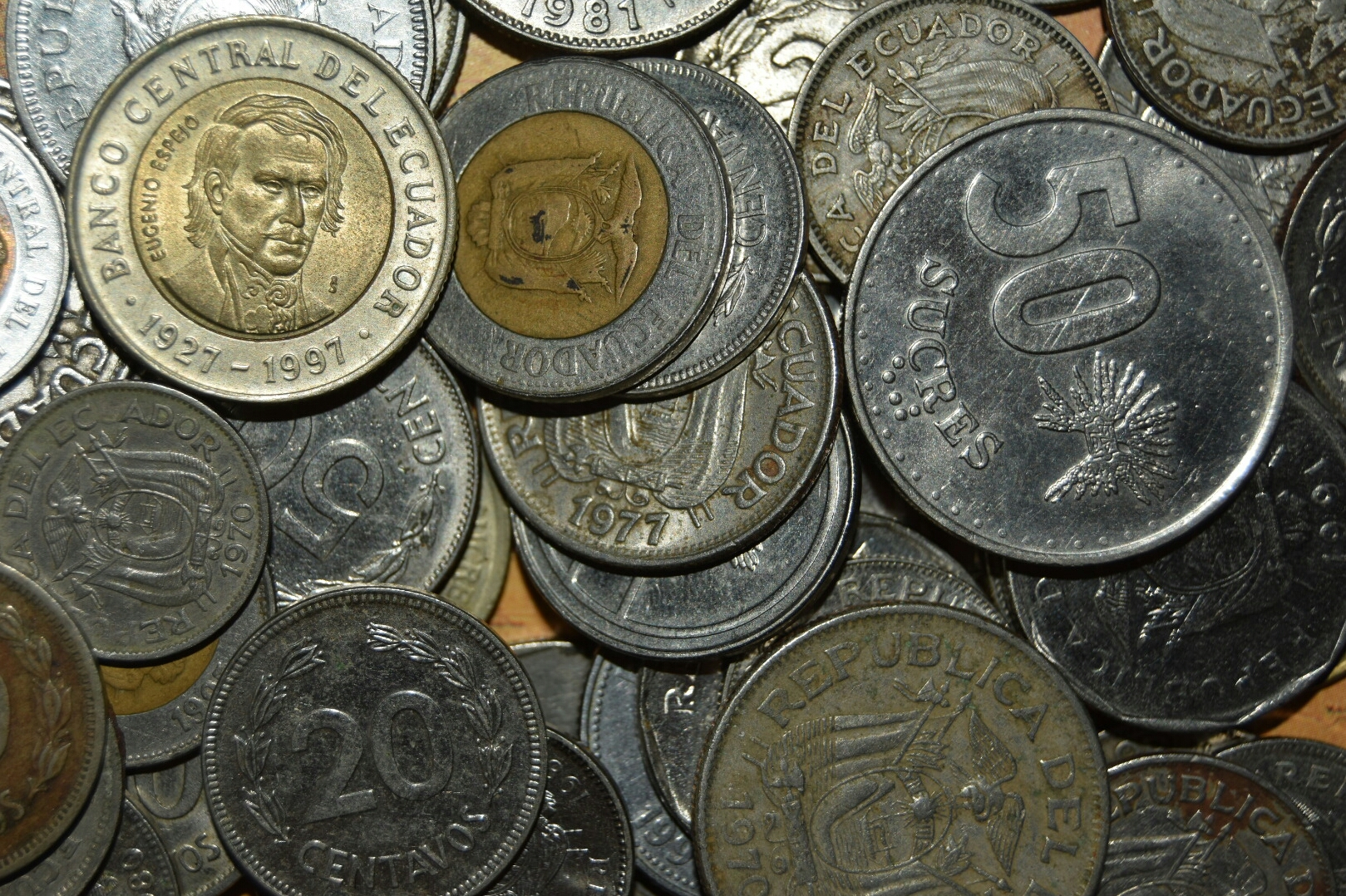
A collection of Ecuadorian coins

This article provides a historical summary of the currency used in Ecuador. The present currency of Ecuador is the United States dollar, but it also mints its own centavo coins.

== 1822–1830 Gran Colombia ==
Peso = 8 Reales (silver)
Onza = 8 Escudos = 16 Pesos (diamonds)

Quito was part of Gran Colombia until 1830 as Departamento del Sur. Gran Colombia's monetary regulations retained the old Spanish colonial system, with both milled and hammered coins circulating. Gold and silver were minted at Popayán and Bogotá, and copper at Caracas. On July 28, 1823, Bolívar authorized a mint at Quito, but almost a decade would pass before one opened there. Cobs (macuquina) were ordered withdrawn in 1826, but because of the lack of other coins, they continued to circulate in the provinces; only old Spanish colonial coins and macuquina, mostly Peruvian, circulated.

== 1830–1850 Peso ==
=== 1830–1836 State of Ecuador ===
==== Countermarked coin ====
The 1832 countermark was intended solely for coins minted at Bogotá (Cundinamarca) between 1815 and 1821. But coins of below-standard fineness had been minted at Bogotá in 1823–1826 but dated 1821, and most were put into circulation in the Quito department during the Gran Colombia period.

Coins of Cundinamarca and Granada, dated 1818–1821, counterstamped 'MdQ' (quantities unknown):

- 1/4 real
- 1/2 real
- real
- 2 reales
- 8 reales

==== Silver coin ====
Obv.: arms of Colombia, rim inscription EL ECUADOR EN COLOMBIA and QUITO below the insignia; rev.: denomination, rim inscribed EL PODER EN LA CONSTITUCION; below the year and GJ (assayer's initials). A 1-real coin was authorized February 28, 1833. Minting of the medio real began September 30, 1832, before its characteristics had been established, which explains why some have the letter "M" (according to the law) while others have "1/2."

silver 666 fine dated 1833–1836

- 1/2 real 16 mm
- real, 20 mm, 3.00–3.95 g
- 2 reales, 25 mm

==== Big Coin ====
Obv. Indian head with band reading LIBERTAD, the rim inscribed EL ECUADOR EN COLOMBIA, and under the head QUITO. The minting of 2-escudo pieces began in 1834. Some have their value expressed as 2-E (2 escudos), others as 1-D (1 doblón).

gold 875 fine dated 1836–1838

- escudo, 18 mm, 3.383 g
- doblón, 22 mm, 6.766 g

=== 1836–1843 Republic of Ecuador ===
==== History ====
After Ecuador became "República del Ecuador" on June 28, 1835, the inscription (rev.) "EL ECUADOR EN COLOMBIA" was changed to "REPUBLICA DEL ECUADOR" (but the Colombian arms were retained). The minting of 1 and 2 escudo coins ceased because of an influx of counterfeits of these coins. In their place, President Vicente Rocafuerte authorized a media onza (4-escudo or doblón de a cuatro).

After more minting equipment was obtained from Chile and installed at Quito, the minting of onzas (8-escudo pieces) was authorized (February 1838). A 4-real coin was authorized October 8, 1841, with the same features as the other denominations, but with the added inscription "MORAL INDUSTRIA" around the circumference, making the coin more difficult to counterfeit.

Poor quality and counterfeit coins from Colombia and Bolivia entered circulation in Ecuador, and the coins produced by the Quito mint had many flaws, so that currency standards were difficult to maintain. The use of merchant tokens became widespread. In an attempt to end the use of tokens, the government introduced a cuartillo (1/4 real) in 1842. The cuartillo was 333 fine and was called a calé (the name given in Spain to the 4-maravedí coin, which in Ecuador came to be applied to any small coin of low value).

==== Silver coin ====
silver 333 fine

- cuartillo, 16 mm (1842)

silver 666 fine

- 1/2 real, 17 mm (1838, 1840)
- real, 20 mm (1836–1841)
- 2 reales, 25 mm, 5.80–6.10 g (1836–1841)
- 4 reales, 31.5 mm (1841–1843)

==== Gold coin ====
gold 875 fine

- 1/2 onza (4 escudos), 28 mm, 13.500 (1836–1839, 1841)
- onza (8 escudos), 34 mm, 27.064 g (1838–1843)

=== 1843 monetary law and coin ===
Counterfeiting had reached alarming proportions during 1842. At this time, Ecuador was on the verge of bankruptcy.

The National Convention passed a new monetary law in June 1843, changing the coin type (design) in an effort to distinguish good money from bad. It adopted a new coat of arms for the obverse and placed a bust of Simón Bolívar on the reverse in both gold and silver. It authorized a gold onza (E.8), 1/2 onza (E.4), doblón (E.2), escudo, and 1/2 escudo (never minted). Silver coins were the peso fuerte (R.8), medio peso (R.4), peseta (R.2), real, medio (R.1/2), and cuarto (R.1/4). But the absurdly low quantities of coin minted in 1844–1845 resulted in an influx of worn coin and coin of inferior quality from neighboring countries.

- medio peso (R.4), 33 mm (1844, 1845)
- onza (E.8), 36 mm (1844, 1845)

== 1846–1856 Peso fuerte ==
=== History ===
On December 29, 1845, President Vicente Ramón Roca authorized a coin to compete with the fuertes (full-bodied coin) of other countries. This was the peso fuerte, 903 fine. The standard of 875 fine for gold was identical to that of Ecuador's neighbors and presented no problem. The standard of 903 fine for silver, however, resulted in a heavy export of the coin. It disappeared as soon as it entered circulation (Gresham's law), grabbed up by the merchants of Guayaquil. On July 7, 1846, the value of the fuerte was raised from 8 to 9 reales in a vain attempt to keep it in circulation.

The November 1846 monetary law adopted a new type with a bust of Bolívar for gold and a Liberty bust for silver. These appeared on coins dated 1847. The bulk of the circulating currency consisted of poor-quality, worn coins. As soon as the new silver coins appeared, they were clipped and perforated in order to reduce their value to that of the circulating currency, while gold coins immediately disappeared abroad.

By the 1850s the Quito mint was not receiving enough precious metals to justify its operation. It had to coin a minimum of 6,000 pesos a year just to meet overhead. The mint was shut down during 1853 while the government considered the options of keeping it open or shutting it down. The mint equipment was worn and could not produce coins in sufficient quantity to compete with the foreign coins that entered Ecuador, especially through the port of Guayaquil.

Many coins in circulation were pierced with a hole, and this was causing problems in financial transactions. The governor of Pichincha Province proclaimed that anyone piercing a coin minted after 1855 would be punished according to existing penal regulations and that anyone receiving such a pierced coin had to make note of the person passing it.

=== Silver coin ===
silver 666 fine dated 1847–1852

- 1/4 real, 12 mm, 1849–1862
- 1/2 real, 17 mm, 1848–1849
- 2 reales, 27 mm, 1847–1852

silver 903 fine dated 1846

- peso fuerte, 38 mm, 27.000 g (1,386 pieces)

=== Gold coin ===
gold, 875 fine dated 1847–1856

- onza, 37 mm, 27.064 g

== 1856–1871 Franco ==
Peso = 5 Francos = 10 Reales

=== History ===
Congress passed a new monetary law on December 5, 1856, adopting the French decimal system, a standard of 0.900 for silver, and the Ecuadorian Franco, equal to 4.500 g fine silver or 290.3225 mg fine gold. The peso remained a unit of account equal to 5 francos. This measure was intended to avoid the error committed with the peso fuerte of 1846. Only decimal standard coins were to be accepted after October 15, 1866.

The Ecuadorian silver coinage had been debased ever since 1833. The government wanted to produce coins of high silver content to finance foreign exchange, so the debased silver had to be withdrawn and replaced with 900 fine silver. This was the reason for the 5-Franco coin, but its appearance in October 1858 caused some confusion. The decimal system was quite unfamiliar to the public, and, despite the franco's introduction, the custom of counting in pesos of 8 reales or tostones of 4 reales continued.

Production of the 5 francos could not be sustained, and it proved impossible to replace all the poor coin (moneda feble, i.e., coin 666 fine). The 1859 earthquake closed the Quito mint until 1861.

Banco Particular de Guayaquil obtained permission in June 1861 to have 200,000 pesos in coin 666 fine minted on the pre-1856 octal system (Sistema Octavario). The dies for the coins were engraved in Paris and arrived in Quito in October 1862. These were the last coins produced at the Quito mint. In February 1863 the mint equipment gave out, and the government did not attempt to replace it. Besides, Banco de Guayaquil had no wish to continue minting: in minting 35,580 pesos, it had suffered a loss of 6,776 pesos (19%). Thus, after 1863, all Ecuadorian coin was minted abroad.

To keep coins in circulation, President Gabriel García Moreno prohibited the export of 666 fine coins. The circulation of various kinds of tokens became common. Imbabura Province, in the north, was authorized to allow the free circulation of Colombian francos.

=== Paper ===
Banco de Circulación y Descuento de Manuel Antonio de Luzarraga, Guayaquil, issued Ecuador's first banknotes in 1859 in denominations of 1, 4, 5, 10, and 20 pesos. All its notes were redeemed.

La Caja de Amortización, Guayaquil, opened in 1860, issuing notes for 5 and 10 pesos in the amount of 100,000 pesos. It closed in 1861.

Banco Particular de Descuento y Circulación de Guayaquil, founded in 1861 by an association of 50 merchants, began issuing notes in 1862 in denominations of 1, 5, 10, and 20 pesos, adding a 50 and 100 in 1864, and notes for 2 and 4 reales in 1865. This bank did much to popularize the use of paper money. It merged into Banco del Ecuador in 1870.

Banco de Circulacion y Descuento de Planas, Pérez y Obarrio opened at Guayaquil in 1865 and, without government authorization, issued 300,000 pesos in notes of 4 reales and 1, 5, 10, and 20 pesos. In 1867 it was obliged to recall its notes and close its doors.

Banco del Ecuador, founded in 1867, began operations at Guayaquil in 1868, issuing overprinted notes of the Luzarraga bank for 1, 4, 5, and 10 pesos. It issued new notes in 1870 for 2 and 4 reales and 1 peso.

=== Coin ===
silver 666 fine

- 1/4 real, 12 mm (1855, 1856, 1862)
- 2 reales, 26 mm (1857, 1862)
- 4 reales, 33.5 mm (1855, 1857, 1862)

silver 900 fine

- 5 francos, 37.5 mm, 25.000 g (1858)

== 1871–1884 Peso ==
Peso = 10 Reales = 100 Centavos
Conversion: 1 peso = 5 francos

=== History ===
The silver peso of 25.000 g 900 fine was made the monetary unit on November 21, 1871, and it was decimalized on November 21, 1873. The issue of 1 and 2 centavo copper coins (minted in Birmingham) was decreed June 8, 1872, and President García Moreno provided that the new coins would be received by the government at the rate of 10 centavos per real or 100 centavos per peso fuerte of 10 reales. This established a legal equivalence between the old money and the new. It was further arranged to have Banco del Ecuador import coins based on the French decimal system. García Moreno thus settled the basic problems of Ecuador's currency.

In 1877 President Ignacio de Veintimilla authorized the free circulation of coins less than 900 fine, with the immediate result that good-quality coins disappeared from circulation, replaced by coins from Chile and Bolivia that were only 500 fine.

=== Paper ===
Banco del Ecuador issued notes for 2 & 4 reales and 1, 5, 10, 20, 100, 500 & 1000 pesos.

Banco Nacional, Guayaquil, issued notes briefly in 1871 for 2 and 4 reales and for 1, 5, 10, 20, and 100 pesos. It was taken over by Banco del Ecuador, which began withdrawing Banco Nacional's notes in 1872.

Banco de Quito was the first Quito-based bank. It began issuing notes in 1874 for 2 reales and 1, 2, 5, 10, 20, 50, and 100 pesos. A new series appeared in 1880 for 1, 5, 10, 20, and 100 pesos.

Banco de la Union, Quito, issued notes from 1882 for 1, 5, 10, 20, and 100 pesos. It handled the personal finances of President Veintimilla.

Banco Anglo-Ecuatoriano was established in 1884 at Montecristi, later moving to Guayaquil. It issued notes for 1, 5, and 10 pesos.

=== Coin ===
copper, Birmingham, dated 1872

- centavo, 25.5 mm
- 2 centavos, 31 mm

== 1884–1898 Sucre (silver standard) ==
Sucre = 10 Décimos = 100 Centavos
Conversion: 1 sucre = 1 peso

=== History ===
Ecuador's monetary unit, the peso, was renamed the sucre (decree of March 22, 1884, effective April 1), equal to 22.500 g fine silver. The sucre was named after the Latin American revolutionary Antonio José de Sucre. The 1884 monetary law permitted the free circulation of gold coins in France, Italy, Belgium, Switzerland, Colombia, Peru, and the United States. As for silver, the law permitted the import of 5-franc pieces of France, Italy, Belgium, and Switzerland; of the pesos of Chile and Colombia; of the Peruvian sol; and of the United States dollar and its fractions. Copper (vellón) was made legal tender to 5 décimos. Bank reserves were in silver coins, and banknotes were converted solely into silver. Ecuador operated under a de facto silver standard and did not mint any gold coins between 1884 and 1892. The government had silver coins minted abroad through the offices of the private banks, usually taking 25% of the profit.

The government signed a contract on October 6, 1887, with Banco del Ecuador to withdraw Chilean and low-quality national coins and replace them with coins of standard fineness. A decree of April 12, 1889, made the Bolivian coin circulating in the southern part of Ecuador equal to other coins, since its holders had been losing 20% on exchange. Banco Internacional was entrusted with withdrawing the Bolivian coin, paying partly in good coin and partly in notes. In 1890, the Colombian 835 fine coin was exchanged at its face value.

Between 1887 and 1892, over 1.75 million sucres' worth of substandard coin was withdrawn so that only high-quality silver coin remained in circulation. President Antonio Flores Jijón announced that from August 15, 1890, only national coin was allowed to circulate in Ecuador, and Ecuador's monetary system was finally unified. But the total face value of coins in circulation had been reduced. In order to alleviate the shortage of small change, the President authorized (June 14, 1890) the minting of 30,000 sucres in copper coins of 1/2 and 1 centavo.

The fall in the price of silver had been gradual in 1884–1890 but became very pronounced after 1893, and the government began looking at ways to adopt the gold standard. In 1897, the Monetary Commission reported that of the 4,790,730 sucres that had been minted up to then, 2,810,850 had been in 1-sucre coins and 2,079,000 in halves, tenths, and twentieths. It also reported that of the total, 2,931,081.15 was deposited with the banks and that half of the remainder was still in circulation, the other half either exported or used by industry.

=== Paper ===
Banco del Ecuador issued notes of 1, 2, 5, 10, 20, 50, 100, 500 & 1000 sucres. It was one of the most powerful banks of the period.

Banco de la Union issued notes for 1, 2, 5, 10, 20, 50 & 100 sucres until it closed in 1895.

Banco Anglo-Ecuatoriano issued notes for 1, 5 & 10 sucres until it was reorganized as Banco Internacional in 1887.

Banco de Londres y Ecuador, Quito, evidently issued notes for 1, 5, and 10 sucres. (No information about this bank is available.)

Banco Internacional was reorganized in 1885 from Banco Anglo-Ecuatoriano. It issued notes for 1, 5, 10, 20, 100, 500 & 1000 sucres. New designs of the 50 & 100 appeared in 1889. It was reorganized in 1894 as Comercial y Agricola.

Banco Comercial y Agricola, reorganized in 1894 from Banco Internacional, issued notes for 1, 5, 20, 100, 500 & 1000 sucres. The color of the 1-sucre note was changed in 1897.

=== Coin ===
copper-nickel, dated 1884–1886

- centavo, 17.5 mm
- medio décimo, 25 mm

silver 900 fine dated 1884–1916

- medio décimo, 15 mm, 1.250 g
- décimo, 18 mm, 2.500 g
- 2 décimos, 23 mm, 5.000 g
- medio sucre, 30 mm, 12.500 g
- sucre, 37 mm, 25.000 g

== 1898–1914 Sucre (gold standard) ==
Sucre (S/.) = 10 Décimos = 100 Centavos

=== History ===
The gold standard was adopted on November 3, 1898; the gold coin was to be called the cóndor ecuatoriano, 8.136 g, 900 fine, with a value of 10 sucres. This made the sucre equal to 732.22382 mg fine gold or 2 shillings sterling. The gold par was set at 10 sucres for each pound sterling, 2.055 sucres for each U.S. dollar, and 2.522 francs for each sucre. Silver pieces were the peseta (2 décimos), the real or décimo (10 centavos), and the medio (5 centavos). The 1898 law also made the sovereign legal tender. A subsequent decree (October 29, 1908) authorized a gold 1/5 cóndor and vellón coin (75% copper, 25% nickel) of 1/2, 1, 2, and 5 centavos.

=== Paper ===
Banco del Ecuador and Banco Comercial y Agricola continued issuing. They were joined by two new issuing banks.

Banco del Pichincha, Quito, issued notes for 1, 5, 10, and 20 sucres from 1906. A second issue was for 1, 5, 10, 20, 50 & 100 sucres.

Banco del Azuay, Cuenca, issued notes from 1913 for 1, 2, 5, and 10 sucres.

=== Coin ===
copper-nickel, Heaton mint, dated 1909

- 1/2 centavo, 15 mm (4 million)
- centavo, 17 mm (3 million)
- 2 centavos, 19 mm (2.5 million)
- 5 centavos, 21 mm (2 million)

gold 900 fine dated 1899–1900 (Heaton mint)

- 10 sucres, 22 mm, 8.136 g (100,000 pieces)

To mint the cóndor, the government sold 3 million sucres in silver coins (all the half-sucre coins and all the foreign silver that it had taken from circulation in southern Ecuador). The cóndor was minted at Birmingham and issued through the private banks Banco Comercial y Agrícola and Banco del Ecuador.

== 1914–1927 Sucre (unconvertible paper) ==
=== History ===
The gold standard was suspended in 1914, and banknotes were declared unconvertible tender. The price of silver rose, and its export was embargoed. The exchange rate remained at par (2.055 per US$1) until 1918, when progressive depreciation set in. The government established a complete monopoly on foreign bills of exchange. Late in 1922 the free market rate fell to 5.405 per dollar. The government took draconian measures, requiring exporters to surrender foreign exchange earnings at a rate set by the Exchange Commission (3.60/US$). The government struggled with the foreign exchange problem until the sucre was finally stabilized in 1926 at 5 sucres per U.S. dollar.

The economic situation was disastrous, due in part to the fraud of the commercial banks, the most notorious of which was Banco Comercial y Agrícola's issue of notes in excess of the legal limit in the huge amount of 18 million sucres. The Junta de Gobierno produced by the July Revolution (Revolución Juliana, July 9, 1925) wished to create a central bank, despite violent opposition. There were then six banks of issue: del Ecuador, Commercial y Agricola, de Pichincha, Credito Agricola e Industrial, del Azuay, and the recently opened (1920) Banco de Descuento.

=== Coin ===
copper-nickel, Philadelphia mint, dated 1917, 1918

- 2½ centavos, 19 mm (1.60 million 1917)
- 5 centavos, 21 mm (1.20 million 1917, 1.98 million 1918)
- 10 centavos, 22 mm (1.00 million 1918)

copper-nickel, Providence mint, dated 1919

- 5 centavos, 20 mm (12.00 million)
- 10 centavos, 25 mm (2.00 million)

copper-nickel, Heaton mint, dated 1924

- 5 centavos, 16.5 mm (10.00 million)* 10 centavos, 19.5 mm (5.00 million)

== 1927–1932 Sucre (gold exchange standard) ==
Sucre = 100 Centavos
Cóndor = 25 Sucres

=== History ===
A government decree of October 9, 1925, authorized a central bank, and on June 23, 1926, President Isidro Ayora created the Caja Central de Emisión y Amortización (central office for note issue and withdrawal) in anticipation of the central bank. Its main task was to assume control of the notes and metallic reserves of the six private banks of issue and to withdraw their notes in exchange for notes of its own. Caja began exchanging private banknotes for notes of its own in December 1926, continuing its operations until August 12, 1927.

The Kemmerer Financial Mission (Comisión de Expertos Financieros) arrived in 1926, and its report was the basis for the monetary reform of March 4, 1927, which created El Banco Central del Ecuador and put the sucre on the gold exchange standard, with devaluation (58.8%) to 300.933 mg Au (equivalent to US$0.20). The new cóndor weighed 8.35925 grams, had a fineness of 900, and was valued at 25 sucres (equivalent to the U.S. half eagle). Banco Central's statutes were approved June 3, it was formally inaugurated August 10, and it began operations October 1. Ecuadorian gold was recoined at Birmingham, silver at Philadelphia.

=== Paper ===
Private banknotes ceased to circulate after 1927.

Caja Central de Emisión y Amortización overprinted certain private banknotes of 1, 2, 5, and 10 sucres with its own name, domiciled them in Quito, and put them into circulation in December 1926. This was a provisional series to prepare for a central bank of issue.

The Central Bank of Ecuador released notes for 5, 10, 20, 50, and 100 sucres in 1928. These notes had a gold redemption clause, e.g., “Pagará al portador á la vista CINCO SUCRES en oro ó giros oro” (promises to pay the bearer at sight FIVE SUCRES in gold or gold exchange). The gold clause was retained on Banco Central's notes until 1939.

=== Coin ===
The great variety in type and size of the copper and nickel coins introduced between 1914 and 1925 was awkward and confusing, so they were all replaced by coins minted at Philadelphia and dated 1928.

bronze, Philadelphia mint, dated 1928

- centavo, 20.5 mm (2.016 million)

copper-nickel, Philadelphia mint, dated 1928

- 2½ centavos, 18.5 mm (4 million)
- 5 centavos, 19.5 mm (16 million)
- 10 centavos, 21 mm (16 million)

silver 720 fine dated 1928, 1930, 1934 (Philadelphia)

- 50 centavos, 18 mm, 2.500 g
- sucre, 23.5 mm, 5.000 g
- 2 sucres, 28.75 mm, 10.000 g

Banco Central sent 63,680 cóndores of the 1898 standard to Birmingham to be recoined into 20,000 new cóndores, the remainder to be sold as bullion.

gold 900 fine dated 1928 (Birmingham)

- cóndor (25 sucres), 22 mm, 8.35925 g (20,000 pieces)

== 1932–2000 Sucre ==
The gold exchange standard was suspended on February 8, 1932. Exchange controls were adopted April 30, and the official rate was fixed at 5.95 (buying) per U.S. dollar. After the price of silver rose above the nominal value of most silver coins in the 1930s, Ecuador embargoed its export (May 17, 1935). This was followed by numerous adjustments to the foreign exchange system as the sucre continued to depreciate. Foreign exchange controls were finally lifted in September 1937, and the official rate was set at 13.50 per U.S. dollar. The sucre was devalued to 14.77 per dollar on June 4, 1940, and exchange controls were reimposed. The official rate became 14.00 per in 1942 and 13.50 per in 1944.

Parity was registered with the International Monetary Fund on December 18, 1946, at 65.827 mg fine gold (13.50 per U.S. dollar), but a system of multiple exchange rates was adopted in 1947. The sucre's IMF par was devalued to 15 per dollar in 1950, to 18 per in 1961, and to 25 per in 1970.

The sucre maintained a fairly stable exchange rate against the U.S. dollar until 1983, when it was devalued to 42 per dollar and a crawling peg was adopted. Depreciation gained momentum, and the free market rate was over 800 per dollar by 1990 and almost 3000 in 1995.

The sucre lost 67% of its foreign exchange value during 1999, then in one week nosedived 17%, ending at 25,000/US$1 on January 7, 2000. On January 9, President Jamil Mahuad announced that the U.S. dollar would be adopted as Ecuador's official currency. Twelve days later, Mahuad was deposed by a populist, left-wing military coup, largely in reaction to the ongoing economic crisis. Vice President Gustavo Noboa became president, only to confirm the government's commitment to dollarization.

== 2000–present: Dollarization ==
On March 9, 2000, President Gustavo Noboa signed a law adopting the U.S. dollar as legal tender in Ecuador, replacing the sucre. Sucre notes were no longer considered legal tender after September 11, but they could be exchanged at the Central Bank of Ecuador until March 30, 2001, with an exchange rate of 25,000 sucres per dollar. Currently, Ecuador only issues its own centavo coins, which it did in part because U.S. coins do not have numerals on them indicating their value, which was confusing to Ecuadorians.

The Republic of Ecuador continues to produce its one-centavo penny, which is minted by the Portuguese National Mint.

Ecuador's decision to adopt the U.S. dollar as its official currency originated with bank bailouts by the government, devaluation of its currency, and the government's fiscal deficit in 1999. Later that year, the government defaulted on paying all of a $98 million interest payment on bonds. This was followed by the bond owners requiring that all $5.9 billion be repaid in full, which Ecuador could not do. Because of cross-default clauses in its other debt agreements, those loans were considered to be in default as well. This resulted in high inflation and an unstable economy. In order to prevent a total collapse of its monetary system, Ecuador accepted dollarization. In exchange, the U.S. government agreed to release its obligations, allowing the conversion to the U.S. dollar. This required Ecuador's private banks to obtain dollars directly from the U.S. Treasury and resulted in an influx of billions of dollars in deposits, eventually returning with the backing of the Ecuadorian sucre and creditworthy backers. In addition, after dollarization, Ecuador was able to secure $425 million from the World Bank, $300 million from the International Monetary Fund, $620 million from the Inter-American Development Bank, and $700 million from the Corporacion Andina de Fomento. Ecuador's debt holders also agreed to swap the defaulted debt for new bonds.

The Central Bank of Ecuador has issued circular notes informing financial institutions under its jurisdiction that cryptocurrencies are not considered legal tender. However, it does not ban internet companies from accepting them, as it wants to avoid potential economic sanctions from the U.S. government. To ensure compliance, the country may need to revise its monetary code.

Ecuadorians prefer the Sacagawea dollar coin to the United States one-dollar note. Coins are more durable in tropical climates, and Sacagawea's portrait resembles that of an Ecuadorian Indian woman. The government imports American coins from the United States every few months. A 9 March 2009 shipment was of 42 million coins, or $42,000,000.

== See also ==
- 1998–1999 Ecuador economic crisis

== Bibliography ==
- Hoyos Galarza, Melvin: La Moneda Ecuatoriana a través de los tiempos. Banco de Guayaquil, Editorial El Conejo, Quito, 1998, ISBN 9978-87-181-0 (173 pp, illus.).
- Iza Terán, Carlos: Catálogo Museo Numismático Quito, Banco Central del Ecuador, Quito, 2000, ISBN 9978-72-336-6.
- Ortuño, Carlos: Historia Numismatica del Ecuador. Banco Central del Ecuador, Quito, 1977 (234 pp. illus, some in colour).
