= Spanish real =

Currency of Spain before 1868

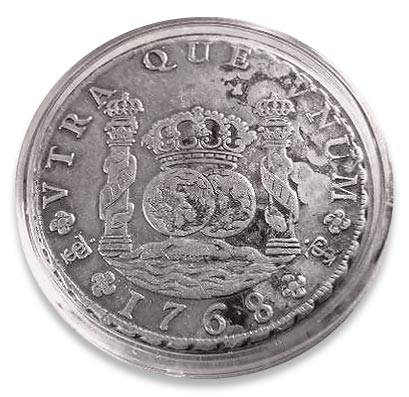
Silver eight-real coin of 1768 from the Potosí mint

The real (/reɪ.ˈɑːl/, ray-AHL; Spanish: [/re.ˈal/], meaning 'royal'; plural reales) was a unit of currency in Spain for several centuries after the mid-14th century. It underwent several changes in value relative to other units throughout its lifetime until it was replaced by the peseta in 1868. The most common denomination for the currency was the silver eight-real Spanish dollar (real de a ocho), or peso, which was used throughout Europe, America and Asia during the height of the Spanish Empire.

== History ==
=== In Spain and Spanish America ===
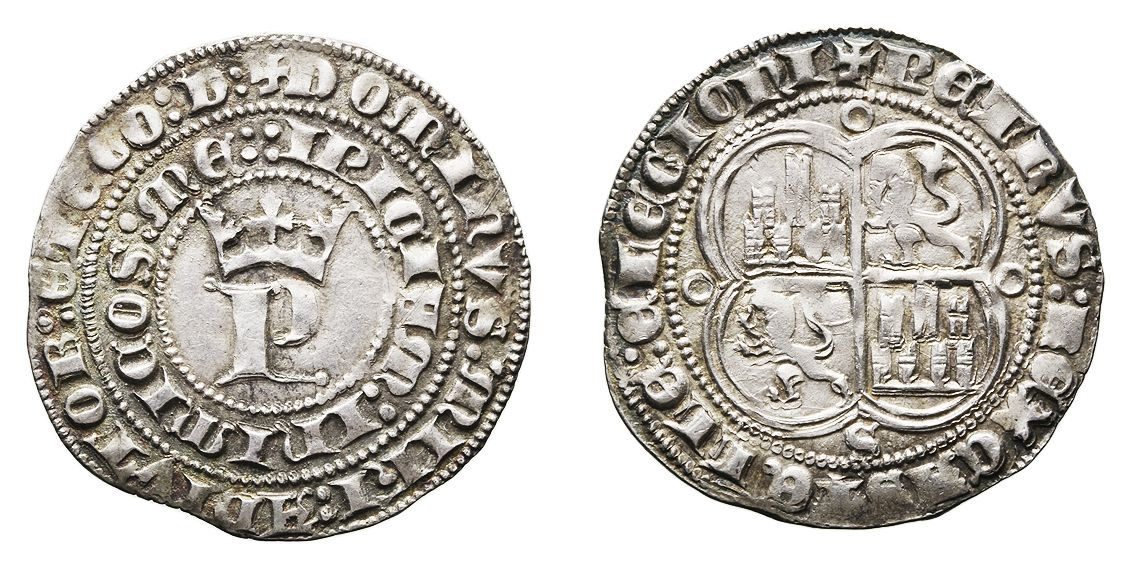
Silver real coined in Seville during the reign of Peter I of Castile (1350–1369)

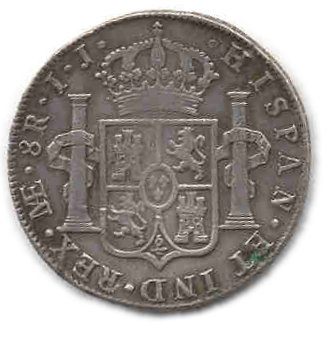
Spanish 1799 silver eight reales, Charles IV (reverse)

The first real was introduced by King Pedro I of Castile in the mid 14th century, with 66 minted from a Castilian mark of silver (230.0465 grams) in a fineness of 134/144 (0.9306), and valued of three maravedíes. It circulated beside various other silver coins until a 1497 ordinance eliminated all other coins and retained the real (now minted 67 to a mark of silver, 0.9306 fine, fine silver of 3.195 grams) subdivided into 34 maravedíes.

The silver real was minted in half-, one-, two-, four- and eight-real denominations. After the discovery of silver in Mexico, Peru and Bolivia in the 16th century, the eight-real coin (referred to since then as a dollar, peso or piece of eight) became an internationally recognized trade coin in Europe, Asia and North America and were known variously as pesos, duros, diuros fuertes, thalers, dollars, and piastres. These reales were supplemented by the gold escudo, minted 68 to a mark of 11/12 fine gold (3.101 g fine gold), and valued at 15–16 silver reales or approximately two dollars.

This real, worth 1/8 dollar, was retained in Latin America until the 19th century but was altered considerably in peninsular Spain beginning in the 17th century. This Spanish colonial real was subsequently referred to as moneda nacional ("national money") and underwent two more changes:

- 1728: 68 reales (or 8 1/2 dollars) minted to a mark, 11/12 or 0.9167 fine (3.101 g fine silver)
- 1772: 8 1/2 dollars minted to a mark, 130/144 or 0.9028 fine (3.054 g fine silver)

=== Spain – 17th and 18th centuries ===
The various financial crises under King Philip II gave rise starting in 1600 to the real de vellón (made of billon, or less than half silver). The relative autonomy of Spain's constituent kingdoms resulted in reales of varying silver content and worth considerably less than the real nacional, worth 1/8 of a dollar. The monetary confusion would not be resolved until the real de vellón was fixed at 20 reales to the dollar in 1737.

The first ordinance officially devaluing the Spanish non-colonial real came out in 1642, with the real provincial debased from 67 to 83 3/4 to a mark of silver (hence, ten reales to the dollar). Actual coins worth a half, one, two, four and eight reales provincial (the latter worth 4/5 of a dollar and called peso maria) were minted in 1686 and were poorly received by the public.

The same 1686 recoinage came with edicts in 1686–1687 fixing the real de vellón at one dollar = 15 2/34 reales or 512 maravedíes (or 1 dollar = 8 reales nacionales, worth 64 maravedíes). The ineffectiveness of these edicts meant that existing reales de vellón were worth even less than 15 2/34 of a dollar (0.0664 dollars).

The confusion to the monetary situation would not be resolved until 1737 in various stages, namely:

- The dollar of eight reales nacionales reduced in 1728 to 8 1/2 dollars to a mark, 11/12 (22 karat or 0.9167 fineness, which is 24.809 grams or 0.7976 troy ounces fine silver)
- Real nacional coins were reintroduced in 8-real and 4-real denominations worth 1 dollar and 1/2 dollar, respectively.
- Real provincial coins were limited to 2-, 1- and 1/2-real denominations worth 1/5, 1/10 and 1/20 dollar, respectively.
- The real de vellón was finally fixed in 1737 at 1/20 dollar and equal to 34 maravedíes (hence 1 dollar = 20 reales = 680 maravedíes), and
- The peso de cambio of 512 maravedíes as introduced in 1686 continued to be used as an accounting unit but worth a reduced value of 512/680 dollar (approximately 3/4 of a dollar). This was divided into eight reales de cambio each of 64 maravedíes.

Subsequent changes until the end of the 18th century were minor and involved reducing the fineness of the silver dollar to 130/144 = 0.9028 fine and the gold escudo (now worth 2 dollars, or 40 reales de vellón) from 0.917 to 0.875 fine. Starting 1810 silver coin denominations were revised to their more common-sense values in reales de vellón: 20, 10, 4, 2 and 1 real with 1 real = 1/20 dollar.

=== In Spain – 19th century ===
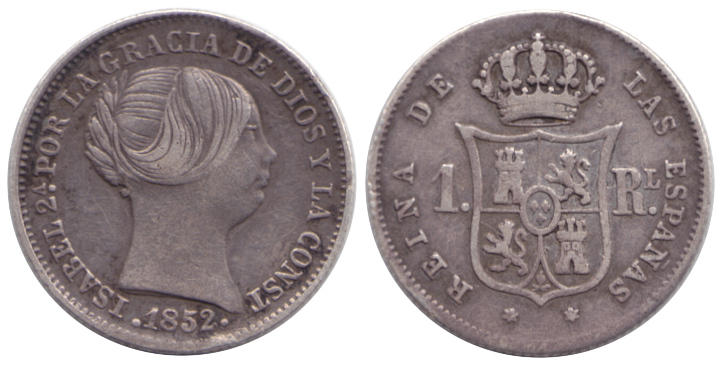
One-real coin, Spain, 1852, Isabella II, silver 900

The loss of American possessions in the first third of the 19th century cut off the inflow of precious metals into Spain and resulted in the gradual use of French coinage in local circulation. These subsequent changes to the Spanish currency system were never carried out in full:

- The first decimal currency of 1850, with the real de vellón worth 1/20 dollar, 10 décimas or 100 céntimos, and with maravedíes discontinued.
- The second decimal currency of 1864, with a new silver escudo worth 1/2 dollar, 10 reales de vellón, 100 céntimos de escudo (not equivalent to the gold escudo).

The real was only retired completely with the introduction in 1868 of the Spanish peseta, at par with the French franc, and at the rate of 1 dollar = 20 reales = 5 pesetas. Consequently, the term real lived on, meaning a quarter of a peseta (25 céntimos de peseta).

== Coins ==
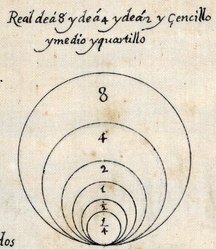
Relative sizes of Castilian silver coins, from 1/4 to eight reales, according to a 1657 document

Coins were minted in both Spain and Latin America from the 16th to 19th centuries in silver 1/2, 1, 2, 4 and 8 reales nacionales and in gold 1/2, 1, 2, 4 and 8 escudos. The silver eight-real coin was known as the Spanish dollar (as the coin was minted to the specifications of the thaler of the Holy Roman Empire and Habsburg monarchy), peso, duro or the famous piece of eight. Spanish dollars minted between 1732 and 1773 are also often referred to as columnarios. The portrait variety from 1772 and later are typically referred to as Spanish dollars or pillar dollars.

Coins were minted in Spain in copper 1, 2, 4 and 8 maravedíes, in silver coins equivalent to 1, 2, 4, 10 and 20 reales de vellón since 1737, and in gold coins equivalent to 1/2, 1, 2, 4 and 8 escudos. New coins introduced after the 1850 decimalization include copper 5, 10 and 25 céntimos de real as well as a new gold 100-real (five-dollar) coin.

Spanish colonial coins were minted in Mexico, Guatemala, Chile, Guatemala, Peru, and Bolivia. The country of origin is denoted by the mint mark which is located on the reverse (opposite side of portrait) of the coin.

== See also ==
- Columnarios
- Currency of Spanish America
- Portuguese real
- Real de alerce
- Spanish colonial real

== Bibliography ==
- Krause, Chester L.; Clifford Mishler (1991). Standard Catalog of World Coins: 1801–1991 (18th ed.). Krause Publications. ISBN 0873411501.
