= Macuquina =

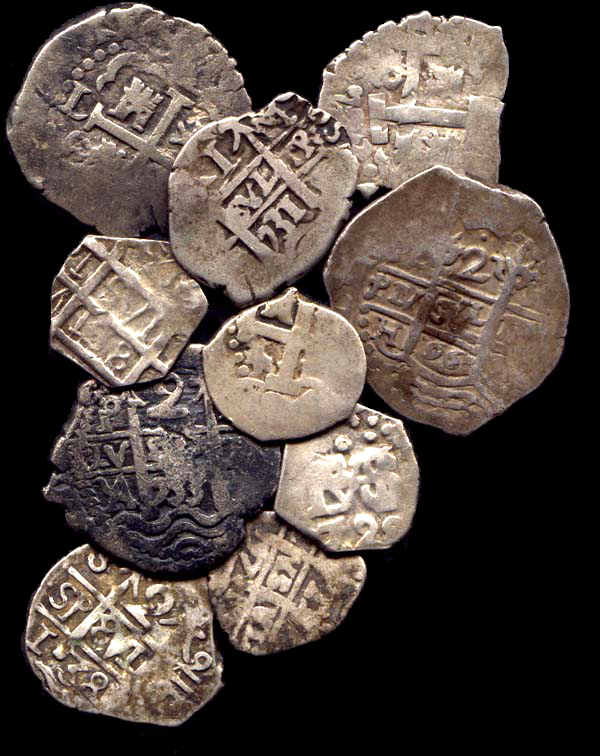
Macuquinas

Macuquinas are manually minted coins issued in Spanish America from the 16th century to the middle of the 18th century. Due to the absence of minting machinery in South America, the coins were of irregular shape and roughly minted with hammers.

== Etymology ==
The name "macuquina" is known in Spain and Spanish America as the type of coin roughly minted manually with hammer blows, a method widely used from the 16th century to the mid-18th century. There are various opinions about the origin of the word: while some maintain that it comes from the Arabic word "machuch" ('approved' or 'sanctioned'), others claim that it comes from the Quechua expression Makkaikuna - or macay pina -, which would make reference to its manufacture with hammer blows.

== Origin ==
The minting of coins manually and with hammer blows has been used by humanity since time immemorial. From the second millennium BC to the 16th century AD this was the most used system in the world to make coins. This does not directly explain why coins of this type existed in the Americas so late in time, given that both the Mexicans and the Incas already worked gold and silver in a fairly traditional and correct manner.

Coinage in several places in Europe was already carried out using the "flywheel press", a large and complex device invented in Italy in the 16th century where metal discs were engraved and cut on both sides using a press. However, such machines, complex for their time and tiring to transport, were not available in the Americas until the beginning of the 18th century and therefore, the first centuries of Spanish colonization were supported by the macuquina currency. The absence of modern machinery to mint money, manufactured outside of Spain, and the needs of commerce in said territories caused the appearance of the macuquinas, also known as "cobs".

Water-powered roller die and punch technology, capable of making high quality, round coinage was imported to Segovia, Spain from Germany in the 1580s, yet the old Royal mint at Segovia continued to make macuquina (cobs). The Royal Mint of Potosi was the last to establish this advanced technology, making them until 1772.

== History ==
Macuquinas ("Cobs") are the original "treasure coins."

The urgent need for coins in Latin America since the beginning of the 16th century motivated the opening of mints such as the Mexican Mint, founded in 1536 by the first Viceroy Antonio de Mendoza y Pacheco; the Lima Mint in 1565 ordered by the provisional governor Lope García de Castro and the Royal Mint of Potosí, all before the year 1600, in order to take advantage of the great production of silver and gold in American lands in order to minting currency that was essential both for paying tribute to the Spanish crown and for commercial traffic in the colonies.

In 1784 (by which time all macuquinas were over a decade old), King Charles III ordered macuquina in the Indies withdrawn and reminted. The order had to be reissued in 1789, but it remained unfulfilled due to a lack of resources.

== Minting ==
Struck and trimmed by hand in the 16th through 18th centuries at Spanish mints in Mexico, Peru, and Colombia (among others), silver and gold Macuquinas (cobs) are handsomely crude, nearly all with a cross as the central feature on one side and either a coat-of-arms (shield) or a tic-tac-toe-like "pillars and waves" on the other side. Silver cobs are known as "reales" and gold cobs are known as "escudos", with two 8 reales (about 27 grams each) equaling one escudo. Some were struck with a date, and most show a mintmark and an initial or monogram for the assayer, the mint official who was responsible for weight and fineness. Size and shape were immaterial, which means that most are far from round or uniform in thickness.

== Use ==
The macuquina's were used heavily used in local transactions in America, although their poor quality produced many complaints. Their irregular shape invited clipping, leading to ever greater numbers of coins below legal weight. Clipped coin tended to migrate at a small profit in commerce to cities in need of coin (often those preparing a fleet for sail) where hard money was accepted at, or near, face value.

They were generally accepted as good currency all around the world, and were the exact coins pirates referred to as "pieces of eight" (8 reales) and "doubloons" (any gold cobs but originally 2 escudos). Their design and history have made them a very popular choice for jewelry.
