= National Mint of Peru =

Building in Lima, Peru

National Mint
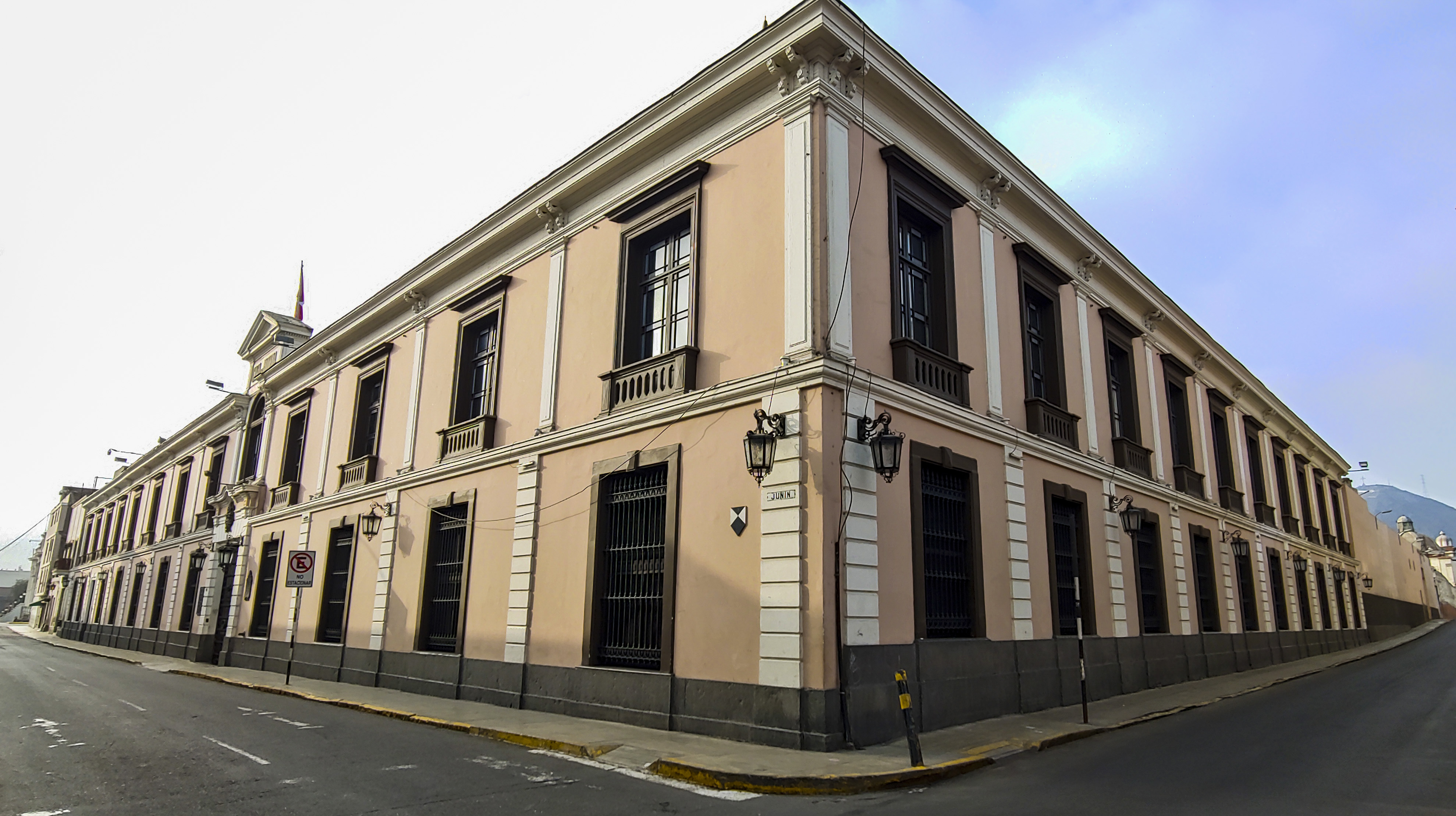
- Interactive map of the National Mint area

General information
- Location: Jirón Junín 781
- Inaugurated: August 21, 1565
- Owner: Central Reserve Bank of Peru

The National Mint (Spanish: Casa Nacional de Moneda), also known as the Mint of Lima (Spanish: Casa de Moneda de Lima), is a mint located in the neighbourhood of Barrios Altos, in the city of Lima, Peru. Its origin dates back to 1565.

== See also ==
- Economy of Peru
- Central Reserve Bank of Peru
