= Peso =

Name of several monetary units

Countries using a currency named peso. Countries that previously used a currency named peso.

The peso is the monetary unit of several Spanish-speaking countries in the Americas as well as the Philippines. Originating in the Spanish Empire, the word peso translates to "weight". In most countries of the Americas, the symbol commonly known as the dollar sign, "$", was originally used as an abbreviation of "pesos" and later adopted by the dollar. The dollar itself actually originated from the peso or Spanish dollar in the late 18th century. The sign "₱" is used in the Philippines.

The silver peso worth eight reales was also known in English as a Spanish dollar or "piece of eight" and was widely used for international trade from the 16th to the 19th century.

== Origin and history ==
=== 1537–1686 piece of eight ===
The name peso was given to the 8-real silver coin introduced in 1497, minted at 8 3/8 pesos to a Castilian mark (230.0465 grams) of silver 134/144 fine (25.56 g fine silver). It was minted in large quantities after the discovery of silver in Mexico, Peru and Bolivia in the 16th century, and immediately became a coin of worldwide importance in international trade between Europe, Asia and North America.

Initially the peso was produced in Spanish Latin America in a rapid and simplified manner by cutting off a lump of silver of proper weight and fineness from the end of a silver bar, which was then flattened out and impressed by a hammer. This resulted in a crude, irregular coin called a cob in English and macuquina in Spanish. The Crown was entitled to a fifth of all gold and silver mined, the quinto real (royal fifth), and cobs were a convenient means of handling and accounting for silver. In most cases these cobs were immediately melted down by the recipient. However, some remained in circulation as currency; they were ideal candidates for clipping and counterfeiting due to their irregular shape and incomplete design.

Spanish laws of 1728 and 1730 ordered the mechanization of the minting of the peso so that they would be perfectly round and have milled edges. There was a simultaneous reduction in weight and fineness to 8.5 pesos to a mark (27.064 g), 0.9167 fine or 24.809 g fine silver. This new peso became even more popular in international trade, with recipients finding it more advantageous to trade it as coined silver of known value rather than melting it into silver bullion. Later it was reduced even more.

This coin was known to English colonists in North America as a piece of eight, then later on as a Spanish dollar, Spanish milled dollar, and finally as a Mexican dollar. In French, it was called a piastre and in Portuguese, a pataca or patacão. The Spanish names at various times and in various places were real de a ocho, patacón, duro, or fuerte.

A final alteration in 1772 further reduced the fineness of the peso from 11/12 fine to 130/144 = 0.9028 (fine silver 24.443 g). A sample of coins at the end of the 18th century, however, confirm a fineness of only 0.896 (hence, fine silver 24.25 g); see Currency of Spanish America. The weight of the United States dollar was defined in 1788 as 371.25 grains of fine silver (or 24.057 g) based on the average silver content of worn peso coins. The full 0.9028 fineness was restored by Mexico after its independence in 1821.

=== In Spain ===
While the relationship of 8 reales = $1 (or peso duro) continued in the Americas until the 19th century, Spain struggled with the issuance of reales de vellon (made of billon alloy with less than ½ silver) of various weights and finenesses starting in 1600 due to its domestic financial and monetary problems.

In 1642, it first recognized a new, reduced real provincial worth only $0.10 or 10 reales/$ for use only in Spain (with the old real worth $0.125 now called real nacional and retained in Latin America). In 1686 Spain minted a coin worth 8 reales provinciales (or only $0.80, known as the peso maria or peso sencillo) which was poorly received by the people.

An edict made in the same year which valued the peso duro at $1 = 15 and 2/34 reales de vellon proved to be ineffective as the various reales in circulation contained even less silver. The situation was only resolved in 1837 with the peso duro fixed at $1 = 20 reales de vellon, with all prior non-standard reales demonetized.

The loss of Spain's territories in the Americas and the ensuing domestic instability in the 19th century cut off the inflow of precious metals into Spain and resulted in French coinage gradually entering domestic circulation. Two subsequent decimal system reforms were attempted in 1850 (at $1 = 20 reales, each of 10 decimos or 100 centimos) and 1864 (at $1 = 2 silver escudos, each of 100 centimos) but were not fully carried out. The peso and the real were only fully retired with the introduction in 1868 of the Spanish peseta, at par with the French franc, and at the rate of $1 = 20 reales = 5 pesetas = 22.5 g of fine silver.

=== 1821–1897 Mexican dollar ===
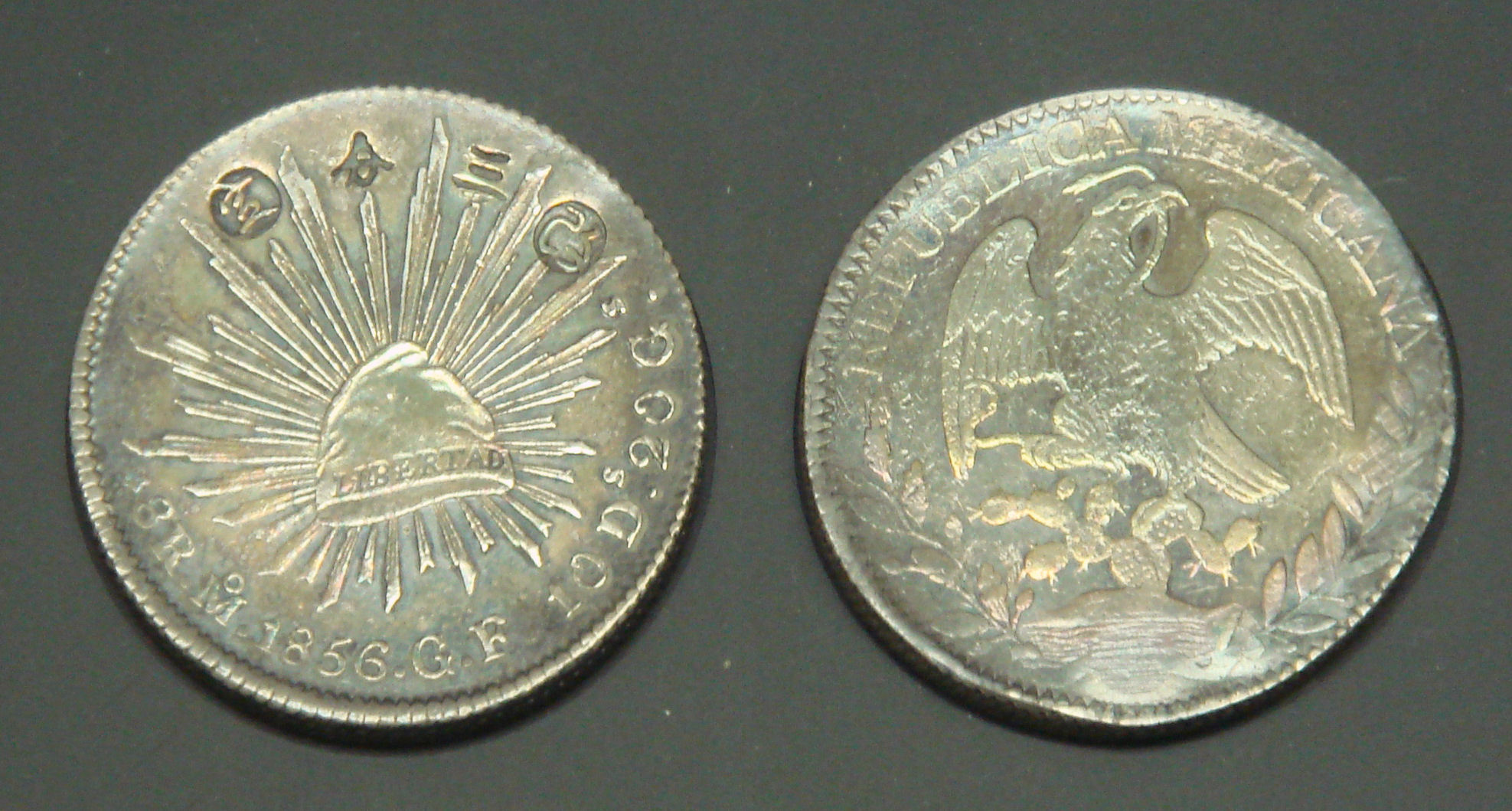
A Mexican dollar used as Japanese currency, marked with “Aratame sanbu sadame” (改三分定), “Fixed to the value of 3 bu”), 1859.

The successful revolt of the Spanish colonies in America had cut off the supply of silver coin by 1820. By 1825 "...the Spanish dollar, the universal coin of three centuries, had lost its supremacy, and...its universal dominion was in process of disintegration into rival 'currency areas', chief among which was destined to be the area dominated by British sterling."

The Spanish dollar continued to dominate the Eastern trade, and the peso of eight reales continued to be minted in the New World. The coin was sometimes called a Republican dollar, but eventually any peso of the old Spanish eight-real standard was generally referred to as a Mexican dollar, Mexico being the most prolific producer. Mexico restored the standard of 1772, producing a coin of 27.073 g, 0.9028 fine, containing 24.441 g fine silver (the mark weight of the Mexico City mint was very slightly heavier than the standard mark of Spain).

In 1869–1870, not long after adopting the metric system, Mexican mints began producing the peso of “Un Peso” denomination, popularly known as “balanza” (scales), with the same weight and fineness, but with a uniform diameter of 37 mm (making it slightly thicker than the old peso, which was slightly irregular, with a diameter of 38–40 mm). Chinese merchants rejected the new coin, discounting it by 4%–5% in favor of the old eight-real peso. Faced with this threat to her silver exports, Mexico returned to the old eight-real peso by decree of May 29, 1873, but international trade was already shifting from silver to gold, and after 1873 there was a steady decline in the international price of silver.

Until 1873 the Mexican dollar would have been to all intents and purposes equal in value to the silver dollar coins of the United States north of the border, but at that time in history, the Mexican coin would have had a much greater international presence than the U.S. dollar. The great silver devaluation of 1873 caused the Mexican dollar to drop in value against the U.S. dollar, but until the beginning of the 20th century the Mexican dollar would still have been a more widely accepted coin in the Far East than the U.S. dollar. Between the 16th and 19th centuries Mexico produced well over three billion of these coins. Mexico minted the last eight-real peso in 1897, and at the beginning of the twentieth century these Mexican dollar coins were worth only 50 U.S. cents.

=== Philippine peso ===
The Philippine peso (Filipino: piso) is derived from the Spanish silver coin Real de a Ocho or Spanish dollar, in wide circulation in the entire America and Southeast Asia during the 17th and 18th centuries, through its use in the Spanish colonies and even in the United States and Canada.

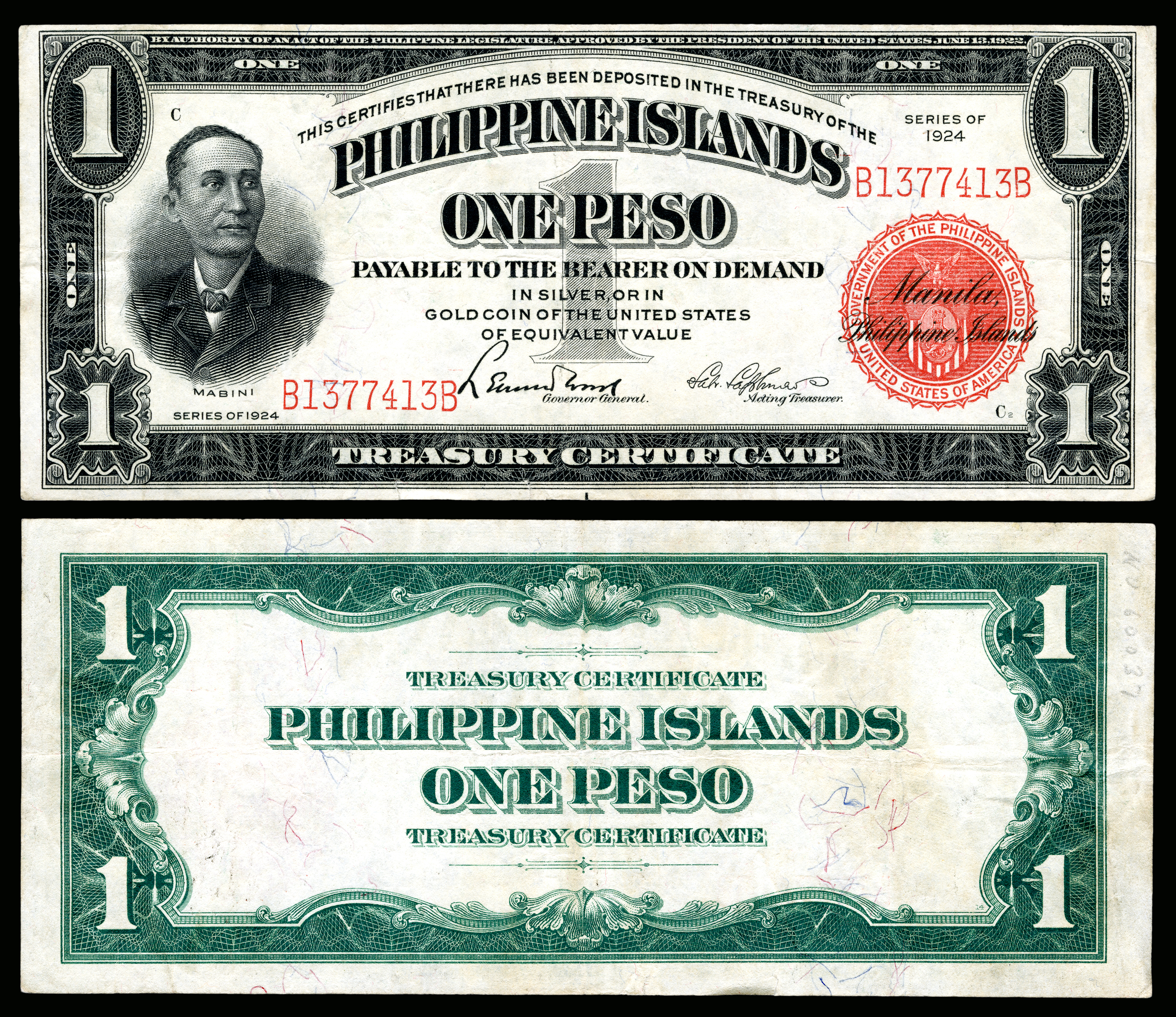
One peso Treasury Certificate

Prior to 1852 the Philippines had no currency of its own (with the exception of local copper cuartos) since pesos received from Spain and Spanish Latin America were accepted in circulation. Locally issued pesos only came about with

- The issuance of Philippine peso fuerte banknotes in 1852 by the Banco Español-Filipino de Isabel II (now the Bank of the Philippine Islands)
- The founding of the Casa de Moneda de Manila mint in 1857 and the minting of gold 1, 2 and 4 peso coins starting 1861, and
- The minting of 50, 20 and 10 centimo silver coins starting 1864.

As with Mexican dollars, the Philippine unit was based on silver, unlike the United States and Canada where a gold standard operated. Thus, following the great silver devaluation of 1873, the Philippine peso devalued in parallel with the Mexican unit, and by the end of the 19th century, was worth half a United States dollar. The name of the currency remained unchanged despite the 1896 Philippine Revolution and the subsequent declaration of independence in 1898.

== Countries that use pesos ==
=== Current ===
Country	Currency	ISO 4217 code
Argentina	Argentine peso	ARS
Chile	Chilean peso	CLP
Colombia	Colombian peso	COP
Cuba	Cuban peso	CUP
Dominican Republic	Dominican peso	DOP
Mexico	Mexican peso	MXN
Philippines	Philippine peso (piso)	PHP
Uruguay	Uruguayan peso	UYU

=== Obsolete ===
Several countries formerly used different currencies also named peso not listed here, with different value, over time. See Argentine peso.

Country	Former currency	Final Year	Current currency
Bolivia	Bolivian peso	1986	Bolivian boliviano
Costa Rica	Costa Rican peso	1896	Costa Rican colón
Cuba	Cuban convertible peso	2020	Cuban peso
Ecuador	Ecuadorian peso	1884	United States dollar
El Salvador	Salvadoran peso	1919	United States dollar
Equatorial Guinea	Equatorial Guinean peso	1975	Central African CFA franc
Guatemala	Guatemalan peso	1925	Guatemalan quetzal
Guinea-Bissau	Guinea-Bissau peso	1997	West African CFA franc
Honduras	Honduran peso	1931	Honduran lempira
Nicaragua	Nicaraguan peso	1912	Nicaraguan córdoba
Paraguay	Paraguayan peso	1943	Paraguayan guaraní
Peru	Peruvian peso	1863	Peruvian sol
Puerto Rico	Puerto Rican peso	1900	United States dollar
Spain	Spanish peso	1869	Euro
Venezuela	Venezuelan peso	1874	Venezuelan bolívar

== See also ==
- Currency of Spanish America
- Paisa
