= Spanish dollar =

Silver coin

Eight-reale coin of the Catholic Monarchs
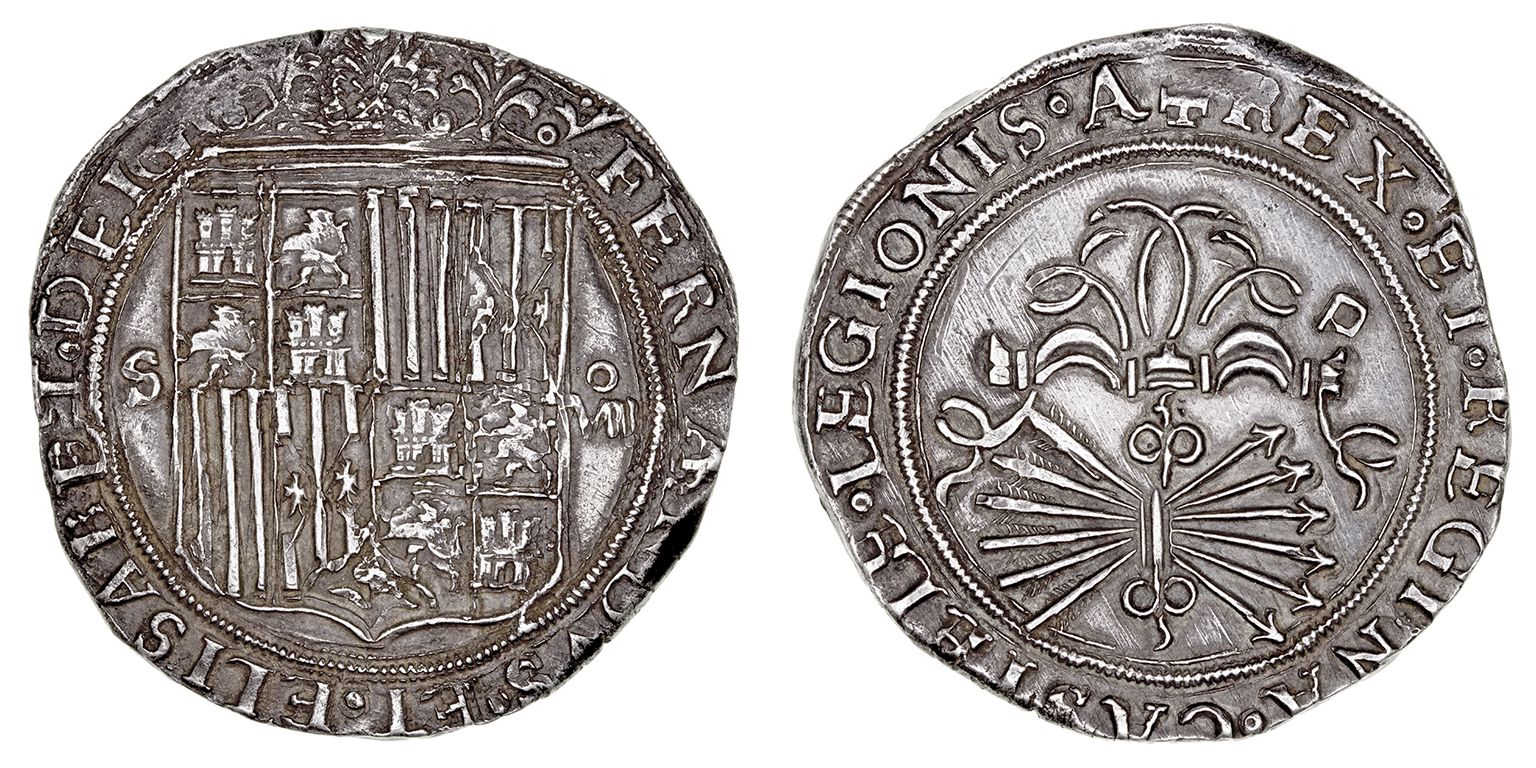
First side of the image: Reverse
FERNANDVS ET ELISABET DEI GR[ATIA]
"Ferdinand and Isabella, by the Grace of God"
Displays the arms of the Catholic Monarchs post 1492, with Granada in base. Letter S on the left is the sign of the mint of Seville and VIII on the right i.e. eight in roman numerals.
Second side of the image: Obverse
REX ET REGINA CASTELE LEGIONIS A[RAGONIS]
"King and Queen of Castile, Leon, Aragon…"
Displays the personal emblems of the monarchs: Isabella's yoke and Ferdinand's arrows.
Silver dollar of Philip V of Spain, 1739
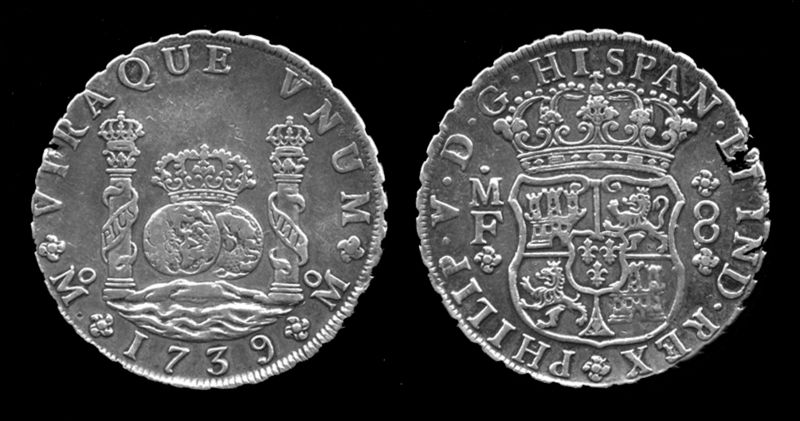
First side of the image: Reverse
VTRAQUE VNUM M[EXICO] 1739
"Both (are) one, Mexico [City Mint], 1739"
Displays two hemispheres of a world map, crowned between the Pillars of Hercules adorned with the PLUS VLTR[A] motto.
Second side of the image: Obverse
PHILIP[PUS] V D[EI] G[RATIA] HISPAN[IARUM] ET IND[IARUM] REX
"Philip V, by the Grace of God, King of the Spains and the Indies"
Displays the arms of Castile and León with Granada in base and an inescutcheon of Anjou.
Silver dollar of Ferdinand VI of Spain, 1753
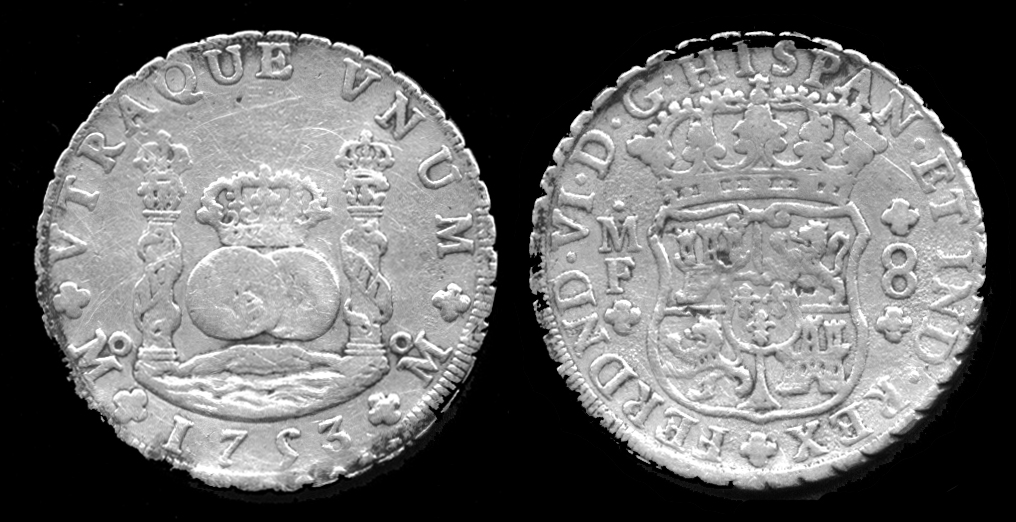
First side of the image: Reverse
VTRAQUE VNUM M[EXICO] 1753 M
"Both (are) one, Mexico [City Mint], 1753." Displays two hemispheres of a world map, crowned between the Pillars of Hercules adorned with the PLUS VLT[R]A motto.
Second side of the image: Obverse
FERD[INA]ND[US] VI D[EI] G[RATIA] HISPAN[IARUM] ET IND[IARUM] REX
"Ferdinand VI, by the Grace of God, King of the Spains and the Indies"
Displays the arms of Castile and León with Granada in base and an inescutcheon of Anjou.
Silver dollar of King Charles IV of Spain, 1806
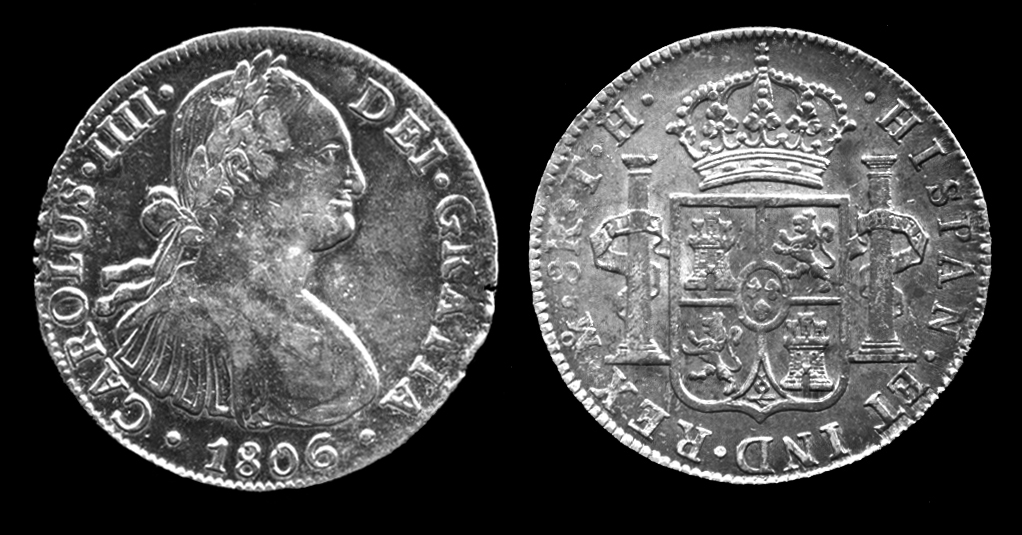
First side of the image: Obverse
CAROLUS IIII DEI GRATIA 1806
"Charles IV by the Grace of God, 1806."
Right profile of Charles IV in soldier's dress with laurel wreath. It was under the reign of this monarch that the United States Mint began the U.S. silver dollar in 1794.
Second side of the image: Reverse
HISPAN[IARUM] ET IND[IARUM] REX M[EXICO] 8 R[EALES] T H
"King of the Spains and the Indies, Mexico [City Mint], 8 Reales." Crowned Spanish coat of arms between the Pillars of Hercules adorned with PLVS VLTRA motto
Silver dollar of Ferdinand VII of Spain, 1821
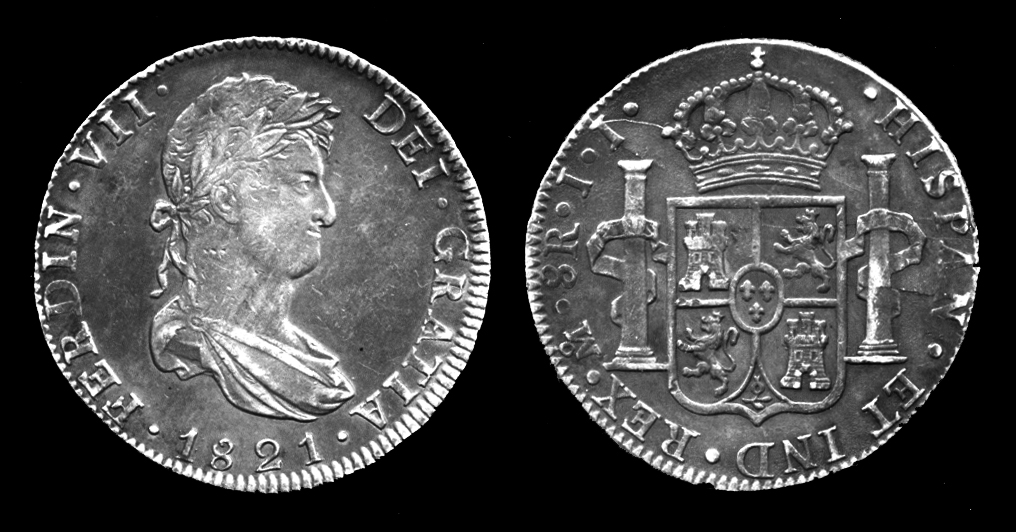
First side of the image: Obverse
FERDIN[ANDUS] VII DEI GRATIA 1821 "Ferdinand VII by the Grace of God, 1821." Right profile of Ferdinand VII with cloak and laurel wreath
Second side of the image: Reverse
HISPAN[IARUM] ET IND[IARUM] REX M[EXICO] 8 R[EALES] I I "King of the Spains and the Indies, Mexico [City Mint], 8 reales."
Crowned Spanish coat of arms between the Pillars of Hercules adorned with PLVS VLTRA motto

The Spanish dollar, originally known as the piece of eight (Spanish: real de a ocho, peso duro, peso fuerte or peso), and much later also dólar, is a silver coin of about 38 mm (1.5 in) diameter worth eight Spanish reales. It was minted in the Spanish Empire, following a monetary reform in 1497, with content 25.563 g (0.8219 ozt) fine silver. It was widely used as the first international currency because of its uniformity in standard and milling characteristics. Some countries countermarked the Spanish dollar so it could be used as their local currency.

Because the Spanish dollar was widely used in Europe, the Americas, and the Far East, it became the first world currency by the 16th century.

The Spanish dollar was the coin upon which the original United States dollar was based, at 0.7735 troy ounces (24.06 g), and it remained legal tender in the United States until the Coinage Act of 1857. Many other currencies around the world, such as the Japanese yen and the Chinese yuan, were initially based on the Spanish dollar and other eight-real coins. Most theories trace the origin of the "$" symbol, which originally had two vertical bars, to the Pillars of Hercules wrapped in ribbons that appear on the reverse side of the Spanish dollar.

The term peso was used in Spanish to refer to this denomination, and it became the basis for many of the currencies in the former Spanish viceroyalties, including the Argentine, Bolivian, Chilean, Colombian, Costa Rican, Cuban, Dominican, Ecuadorian, Guatemalan, Honduran, Mexican, Nicaraguan, Paraguayan, Philippine, Puerto Rican, Peruvian, Salvadoran, Uruguayan, and Venezuelan pesos. Of these, peso remains the name of the official currency in the Philippines, Mexico, Cuba, the Dominican Republic, Colombia, Chile, Argentina, and Uruguay.

== History ==
=== Etymology ===
In the 16th century, Count Hieronymus Schlick of Bohemia began minting a silver coin known as a Joachimsthaler, or simply thaler, named after Joachimsthal, the valley in the Ore Mountains where the silver was mined. The word thaler was borrowed into English as dollar and came to be used for a number of European coins, including the Spanish peso, or piece of eight.

"Peso de a Ocho" truly translates as "weight of eight", meaning that it is valued at eight royals (ocho reales), but English speakers heard "peso", and translated that as "piece". The word "weight" or "peso" is related to money due to the fact that when coin was made out of silver or gold, weighing it was often used to verify value.

=== Europe and colonial North America ===
The Joachimsthaler consisted of 451 troy grains (29.2 g; 0.94 ozt) of silver. This coin's success led to similar thalers being minted in Burgundy and France and their ultimate succession by the long-lived Reichsthaler of the Holy Roman Empire, used from the 16th to 19th centuries, of 25.984 g (0.8354 ozt) pure silver.

The Netherlands also introduced its own dollars in the 16th century: the Burgundian Cross Thaler (Bourgondrische Kruisdaalder), the German-inspired Rijksdaalder, and the Dutch lion dollar (leeuwendaalder). The latter coin was used for Dutch trade in the Middle East, in the Dutch East Indies and West Indies, and in the Thirteen Colonies of North America.

For the English North American colonists, however, the Spanish peso or "piece of eight" has always held first place, and this coin was also called the "dollar" as early as 1581. After the Declaration of American Independence, the United States dollar was introduced in 1792 at par with this coin at 371.25 grains = 0.7735 troy ounces = 24.0566 g. Alexander Hamilton arrived at these numbers based on a treasury assay of the average fine silver content of a selection of worn Spanish dollars.

The term cob was used in Ireland and the British colonies to mean a piece of eight or a Spanish-American dollar, because Spanish gold and silver coins were irregularly shaped and crudely struck before the machine-milled dollar was introduced in 1732.

=== Spain ===
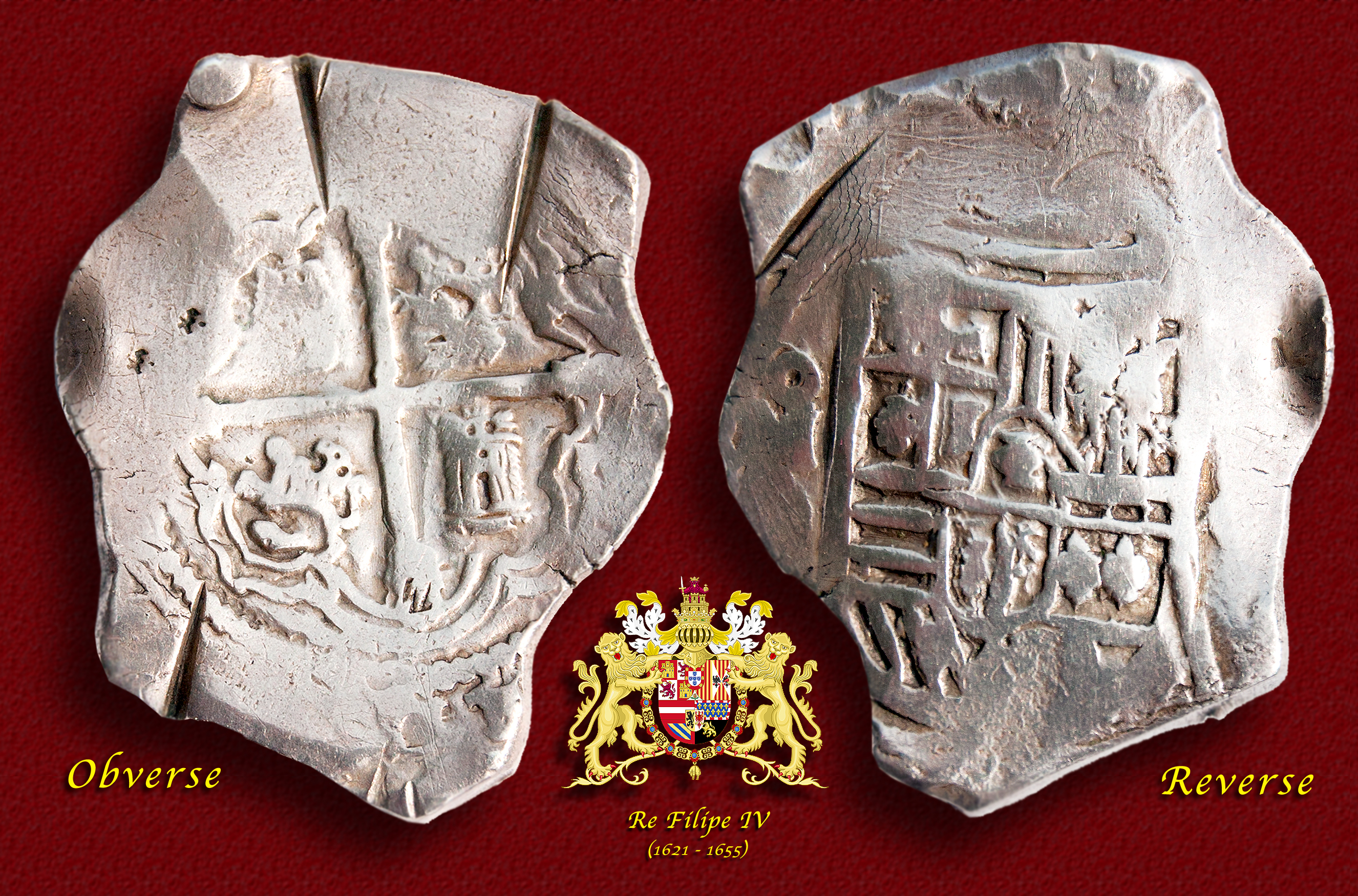
A silver Spanish dollar minted in Mexico City c. 1650

After the introduction of the Guldengroschen in Austria in 1486, the concept of a large silver coin with high purity (sometimes known as "specie" coinage) eventually spread throughout the rest of Europe. Monetary reform in Spain brought about the introduction of an eight-real (or one-peso) coin in 1497, minted to the following standards:

- In 1497: 8 3/8 dollars to a Castilian mark of silver (230.0465 grams), 134/144 or 0.9306 fine (25.561 g fine silver = 0.8218 oz t)
- In 1728: $8.50 to a mark, 11/12 or 0.9167 fine (24.809 g fine silver = 0.7976 oz t)
- In 1772: $8.50 to a mark, 130/144 or 0.9028 fine (24.443 g fine silver = 0,78554 oz t); but true fineness 1772–1821 believed to be only 0.89.

This was supplemented in 1537 by the gold escudo, minted at 68 to a mark of gold 0.917 fine (fineness reduced to 0.906 in 1742 and 0.875 in 1786). It was valued at 15–16 reales or approximately two dollars. The famed Gold Doubloon was worth two escudos or approximately four dollars.

From the 15th to the 19th centuries the coin was minted with several different designs at various mints in Spain and the New World, having gained wide acceptance beyond Spain's borders. Thanks to the vast silver deposits that were found mainly in Potosí, in modern-day Bolivia, and to a lesser extent in Mexico (for example, at Taxco and Zacatecas), and to silver from Spain's possessions throughout the Americas, mints in Mexico and Peru also began to strike the coin. The main New World mints for Spanish dollars were at Potosí, Lima, and Mexico City (with minor mints at Bogotá, Popayán, Guatemala City, and Santiago), and silver dollars from these mints could be distinguished from those minted in Spain by the Pillars of Hercules design on the reverse.

The dollar or peso was divided into eight reales in Spanish Latin America until the 19th century, when the peso was divided into 100 centavos. However, monetary turbulence in Spain, beginning under the reign of King Philip II, resulted in the dollar being subdivided as follows in Spain only:

- Until 1642: $1 = 8 reales, subsequently called reales nacionales
- From 1642: $1 = 10 reales provinciales
- From 1687: $1 = 15 2/34 reales de vellón (made of billon alloy; edict not effective)
- From 1737: $1 = 20 reales de vellón
- In 1864: $1 = 2 silver escudos (different from the gold escudo)
- And finally, in 1869: $1 = 5 Spanish pesetas, the latter at par with the French franc in the Latin Monetary Union.

Spain's adoption of the peseta, in 1869, and its joining the Latin Monetary Union meant the effective end of the last vestiges of the Spanish dollar in Spain itself. However, the five-peseta coin (or duro) was slightly smaller and lighter but was also of high-purity (90%) silver.

In the 1990s, commemorative 2,000-peseta coins were minted, similar in size and weight to the dollar.

=== Mexico ===
Spanish Real de a Ocho coin (referred to as a "peso" or sometimes as a "dollar") minted in Mexico City (c. 1809)

Following independence in 1821, Mexican coinage of silver reales and gold escudos followed that of Spanish lines until decimalization and the introduction of the peso, worth eight reales, or 100 centavos. It continued to be minted to Spanish standards throughout the 19th century, with the peso at 27.07 grams (0.955 oz) of 0.9028 fine silver, and the escudo at 3.383 grams (0.1193 oz) of 0.875 fine gold. The Mexican peso, or eight-real coin, continued to be a popular international trading coin throughout the 19th century.

After 1918, the peso was reduced in size and fineness, with further reductions in the 1940s and 1950s. Coins of two- (1921), five- (1947), and ten-peso (1955) denominations were also minted during the same period, with sizes and fineness similar to the old peso.

=== Australia ===
After the colony of New South Wales was founded in Australia in 1788, it ran into the problem of a lack of coinage, particularly since trading vessels took coins out of the colony in exchange for their cargo. In 1813, Governor Lachlan Macquarie made creative use of £10,000 in Spanish dollars sent by the British government. To make it difficult to take the coins out of the colony, and to double their number, the centres of the coins were punched out. The punched centre, known as the "dump", was valued at 15 pence, and the outer rim, known as the "holey dollar", was worth five shillings. This was indicated by overstamping the two new coins. The obverse of the holey dollar was stamped the words "New South Wales" and the date, 1813, and the reverse with the words "five shillings". The obverse of the dump was stamped with a crown, the words "New South Wales" and the date, 1813, and the reverse with the words "fifteen pence". The mutilated coins became the first official currency produced specifically for circulation in Australia. The expedient was relatively short-lived. The British Parliament passed the Sterling Silver Money Act in 1825, which made British coins the only recognized form of currency and ended any legitimate use of the holey dollar and dump in the Australian colonies.

=== United States ===
The Coinage Act of 1792 created the United States Mint and initially defined the United States dollar at par with the Spanish dollar due to its international reputation:

By far the leading specie coin circulating in America was the Spanish silver dollar, defined as consisting of 387 grains of pure silver. The dollar was divided into "pieces of eight," or "bits," each consisting of one-eighth of a dollar. Spanish dollars came into the North American colonies through lucrative trade with the West Indies. The Spanish silver dollar had been the world's outstanding coin since the early 16th century, and was spread partially by dint of the vast silver output of the Spanish colonies in Latin America. More important, however, was that the Spanish dollar, from the 16th to the 19th century, was relatively the most stable and least debased coin in the Western world.

The Coinage Act of 1792 specified that the U.S. dollar would contain 371.25 grains (24.057 g) pure or 416 grains (27.0 g) standard silver. This specification was based on the average weight of a random selection of worn Spanish dollars which Alexander Hamilton ordered to be weighed at the Treasury. Initially this dollar was comparable to the 371–373 grains found in circulating Spanish dollars and aided in its exportation overseas. The restoration of the old 0.9028 fineness in the Mexican peso after 1821, however, increased the latter's silver content to 24.44 grams (0.786 ozt; 377.2 gr) and reduced the export demand for U.S. dollars.

Before the American Revolution, owing to British mercantilist policies, there was a chronic shortage of British currency in Britain's colonies. Trade was often conducted with Spanish dollars that had been obtained through illicit trade with the West Indies. Spanish coinage was legal tender in the United States until the Coinage Act of 1857 discontinued the practice. The pricing of equities on U.S. stock exchanges in 1/8-dollar denominations persisted until the New York Stock Exchange converted first to pricing in sixteenths of a dollar on 24 June 1997, and then in 2001 to decimal pricing.

=== Africa ===
In Egypt, Spanish dollars with the pillars of Hercules on the back had amuletic and magical significance. These pillars were interpreted as cannons by Egyptians, which are made of iron. Iron is useful in defending against jinn, leading to the magical association.

=== Asia ===
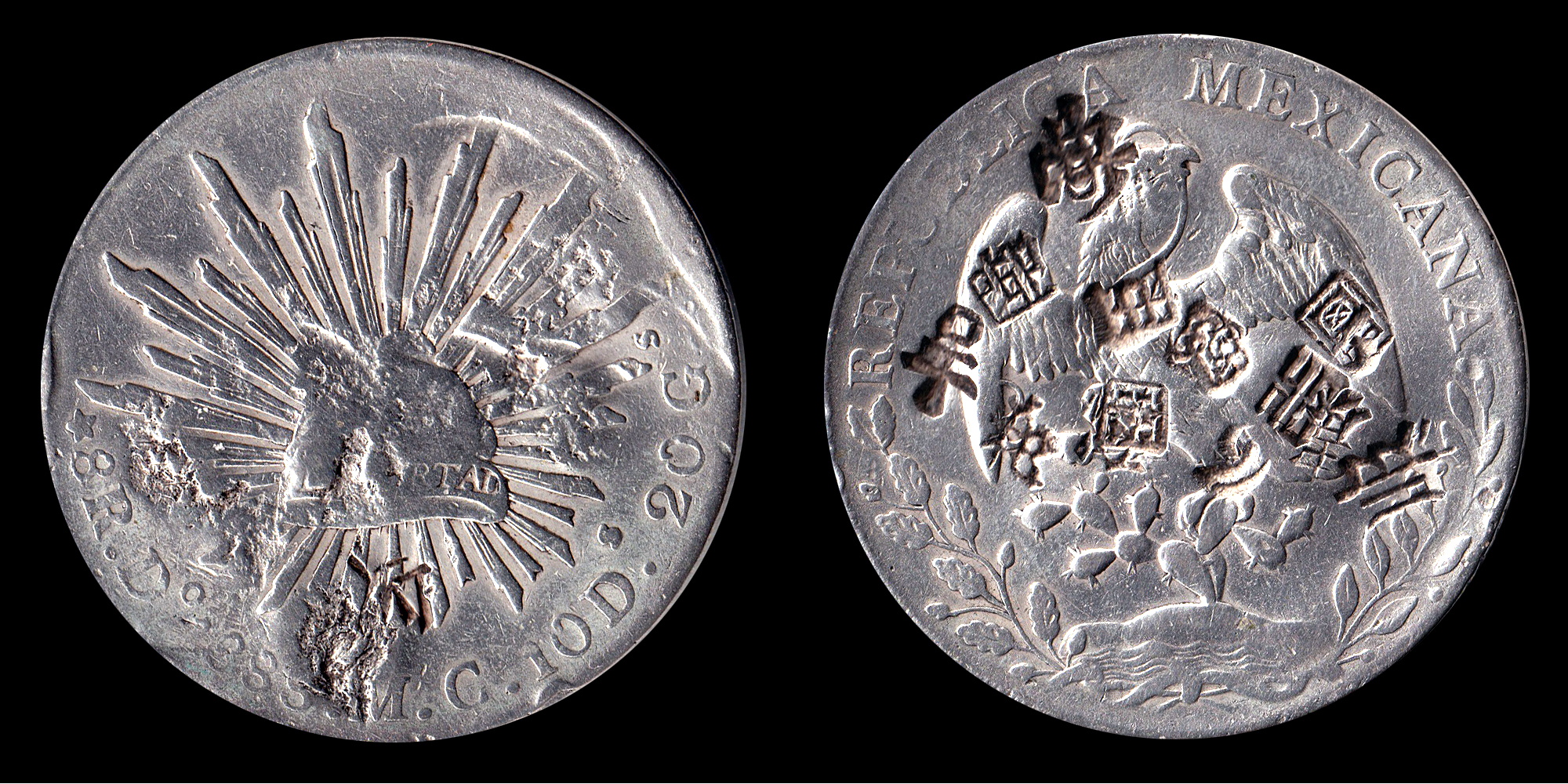
1888 Mexican dollar with Chinese chop marks

Long tied to the lore of piracy, "pieces of eight" were manufactured in the Spanish Americas and transported in bulk back to Spain, making them a very tempting target for seagoing pirates. In the Far East, it also arrived in the form of the Philippine peso in the Philippines as part of the Spanish East Indies of the Spanish colonial empire through the Manila galleons that transported Mexican silver peso to Manila in the Manila–Acapulco Galleon Trade, where it would be exchanged for Philippine and Chinese goods, since silver was the only foreign commodity China would accept. In Oriental trade, Spanish dollars were often stamped with Chinese characters known as chop marks, which indicated that a coin so marked had been assayed by a well-known merchant and determined to be genuine. The specifications of the Spanish dollar became a standard for trade in the Far East, with later Western powers issuing trade dollars, and colonial currencies such as the Hong Kong dollar, to the same specifications.

The first Chinese yuan coins had the same specification as a Spanish dollar, leading to a continuing equivalence in some respects between the names "yuan" and "dollar" in the Chinese language. Other currencies also derived from the dollar include the Japanese yen, Korean won, Philippine peso, Malaysian ringgit, French Indochinese piastre, etc. since it was widely traded across the Far East in the East Indies and East Asia.

Contemporary names used for Spanish dollars in Qing dynasty China include běnyáng (本洋), shuāngzhù (雙柱), zhùyáng (柱洋), fóyáng (佛洋), fótóu (佛頭), fóyín (佛銀), and fótóuyín (佛頭銀). The "fó" element in those Chinese names referred to the King of Spain in those coins, as his face resembled that of images of the Buddha (佛 in Chinese); and the "zhù" part of those names referred to the two pillars in the Spanish coat of arms.

Area of influence of the real de a ocho and other Spanish and Portuguese coins

=== Spanish dollars countermarked in other countries ===
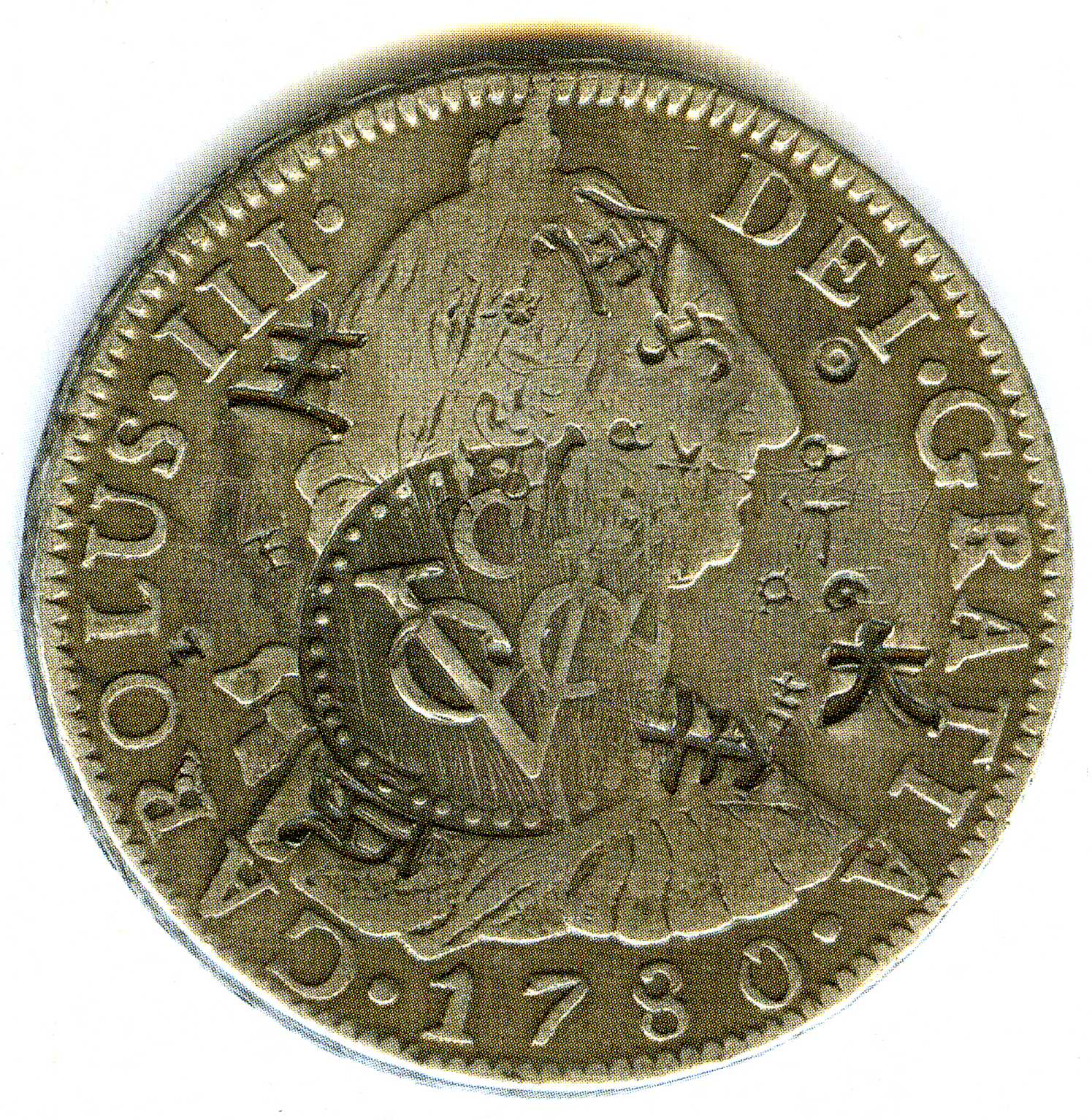
Sri Lanka

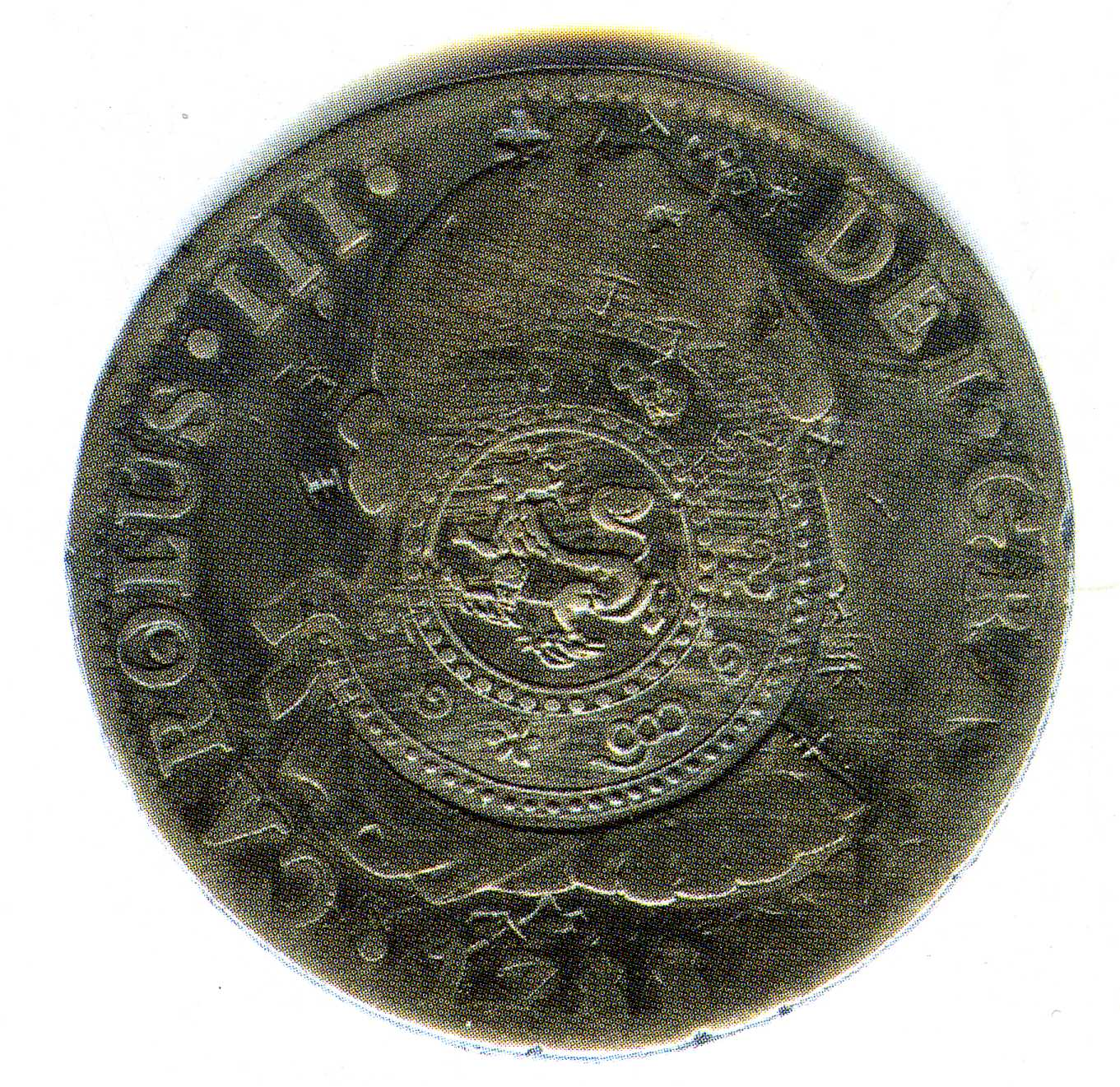
Burma

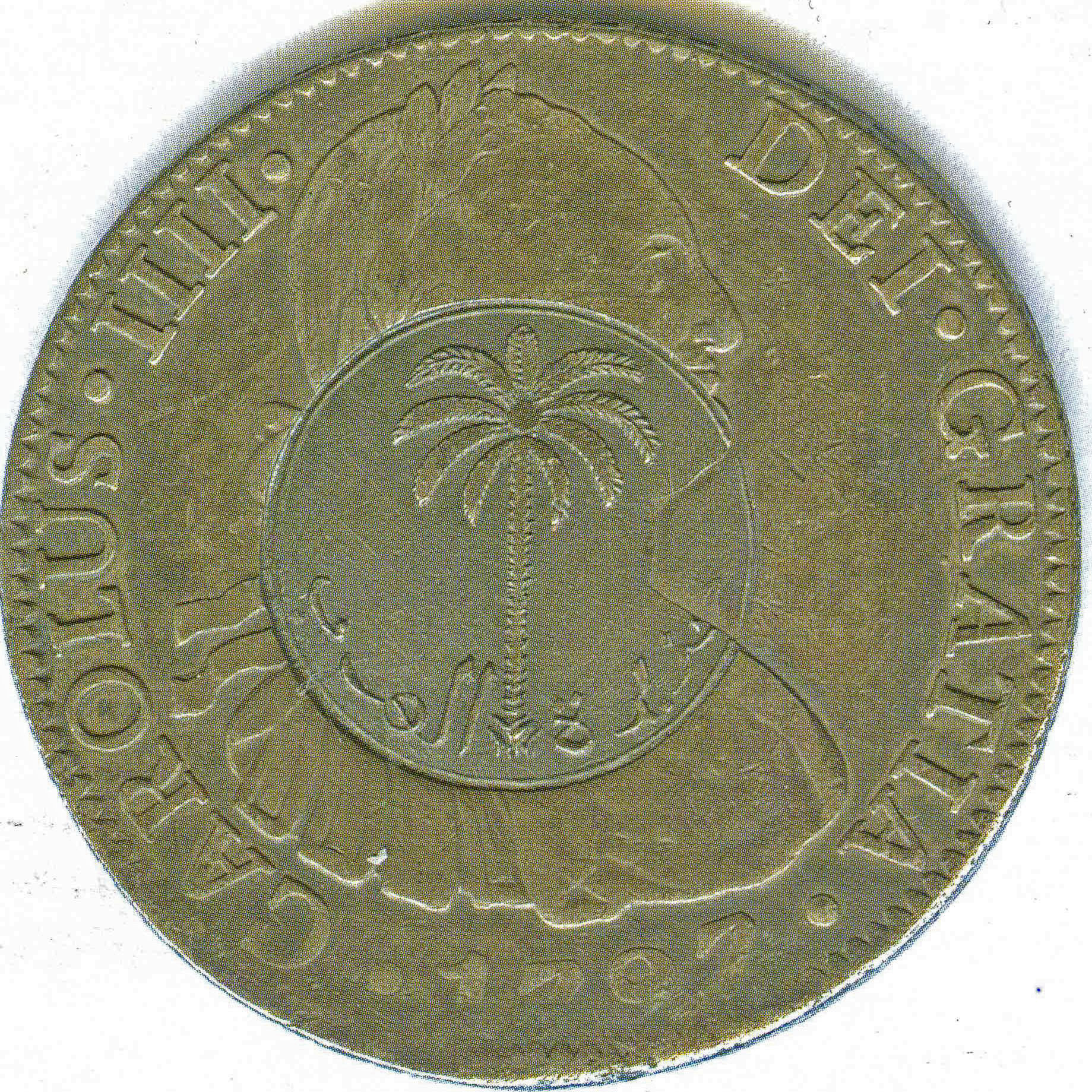
Saudi Arabia

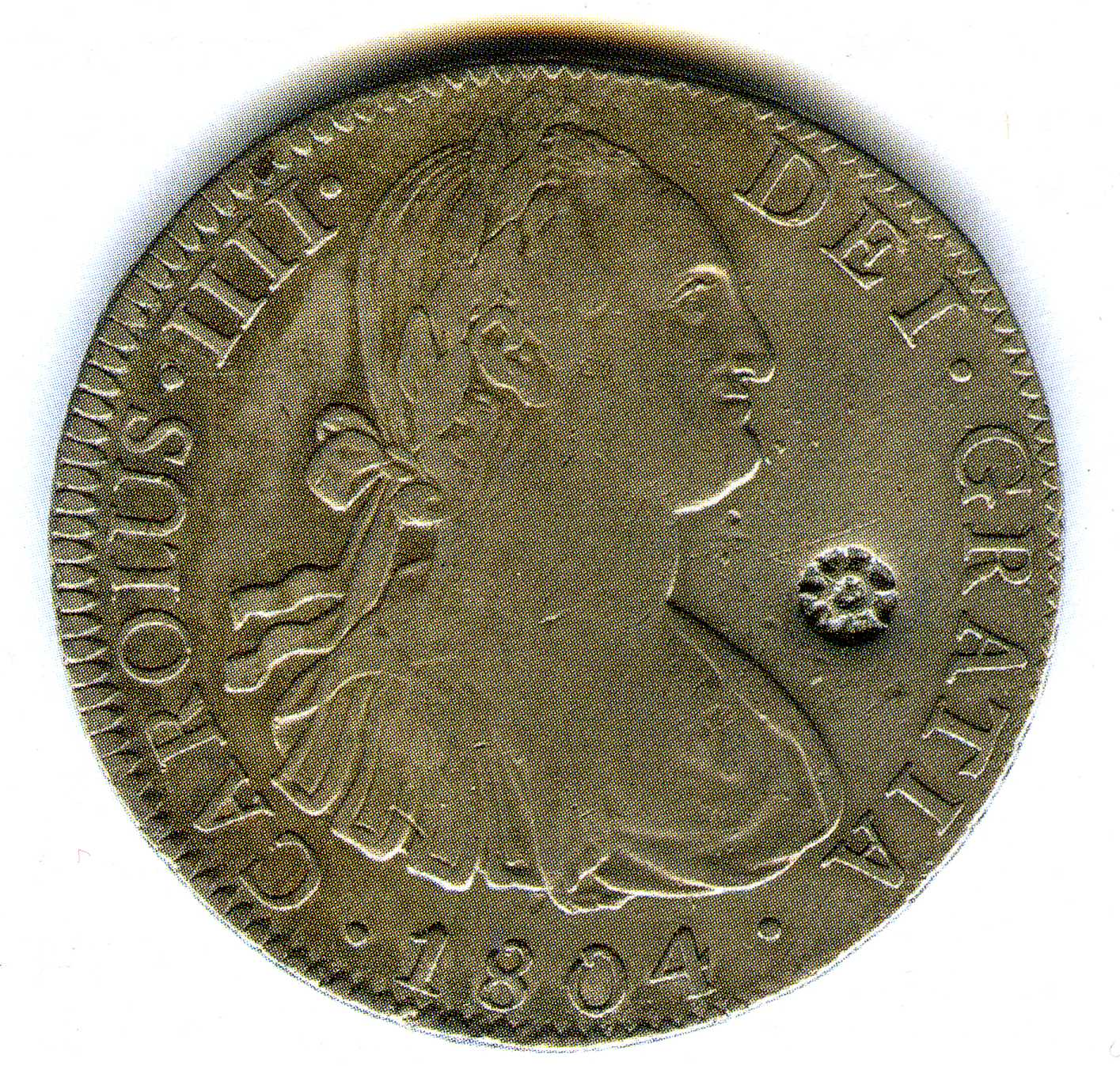
Thailand

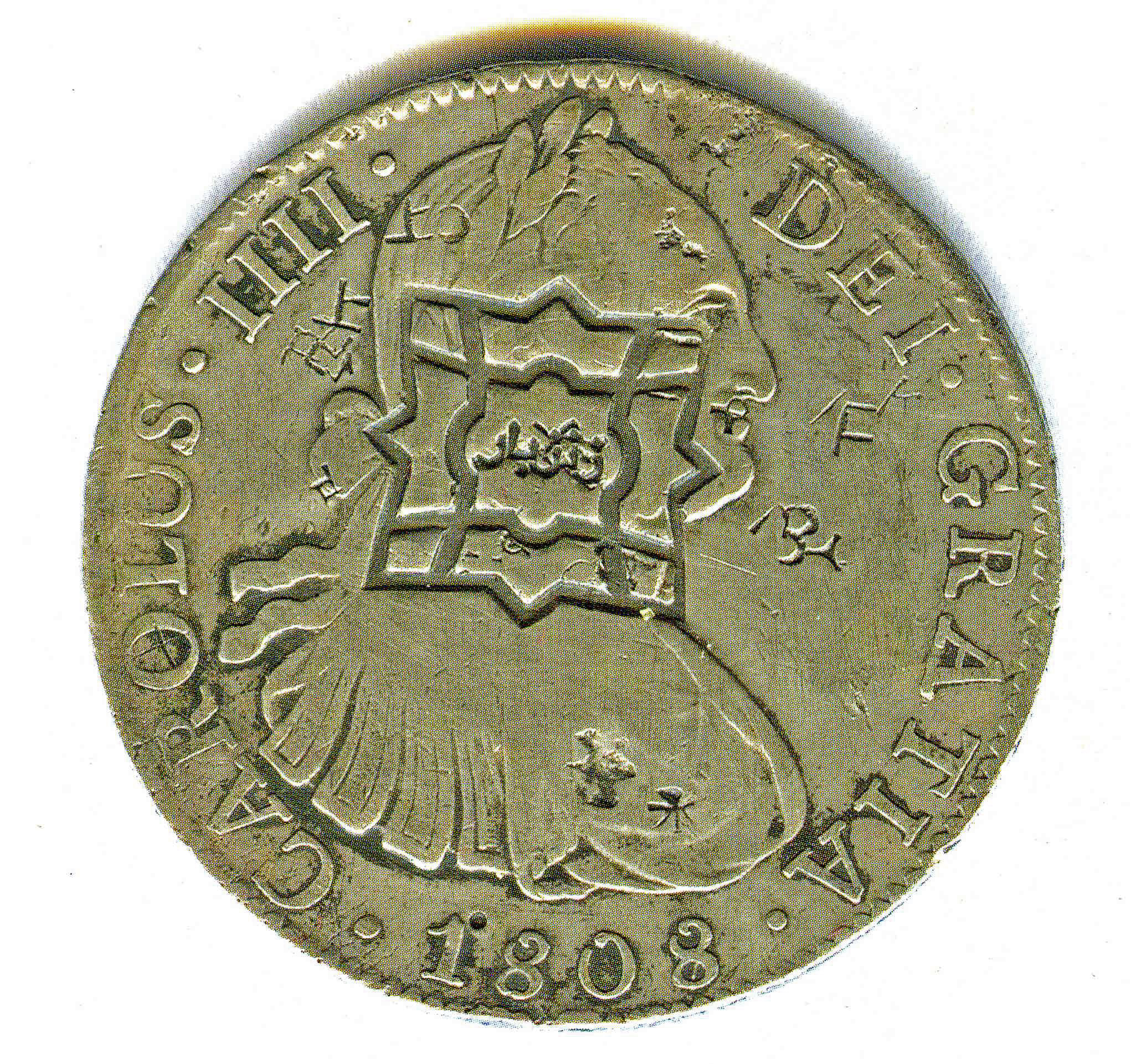
Zanzibar

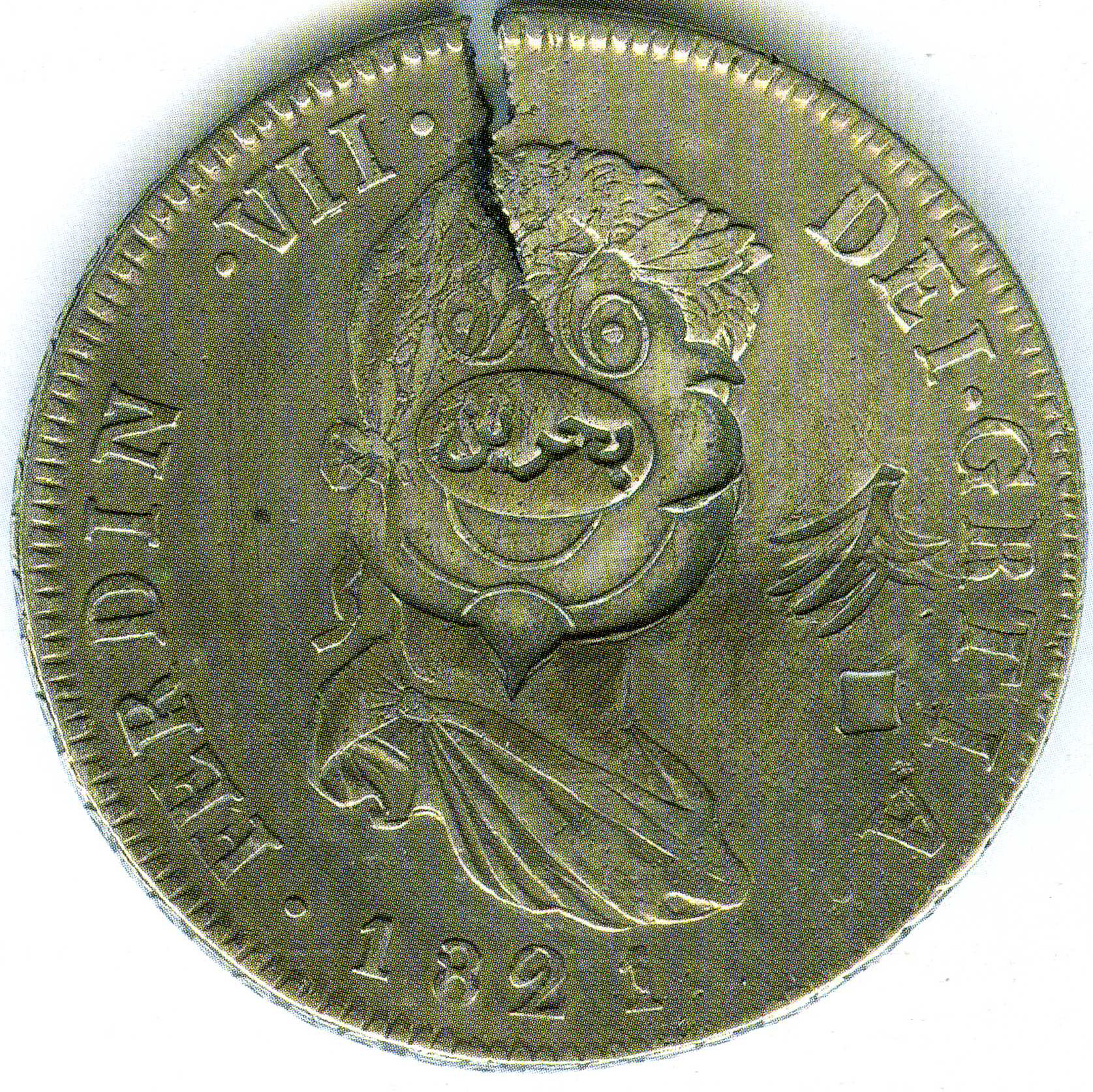
Bahrain

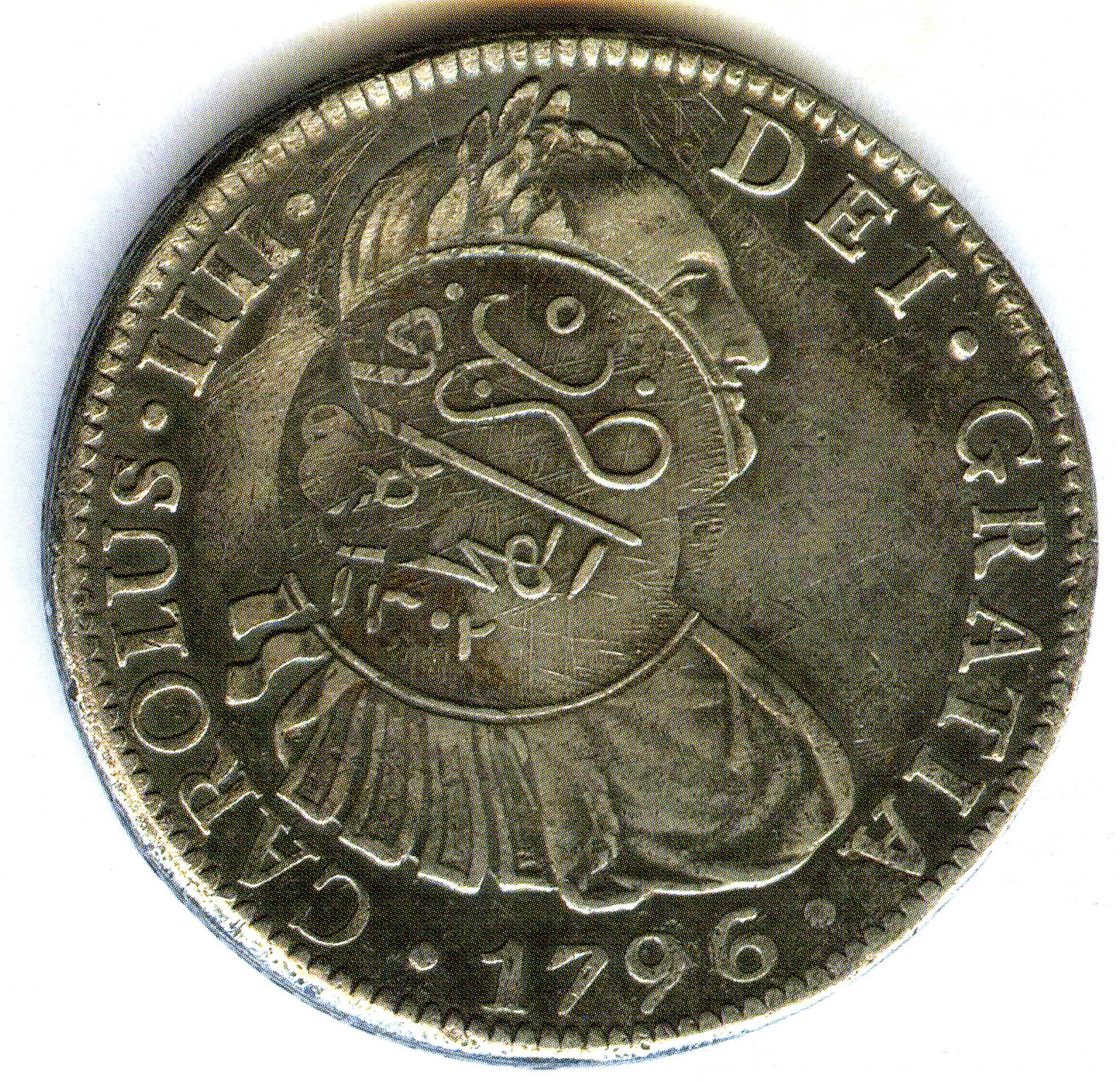
Sudan

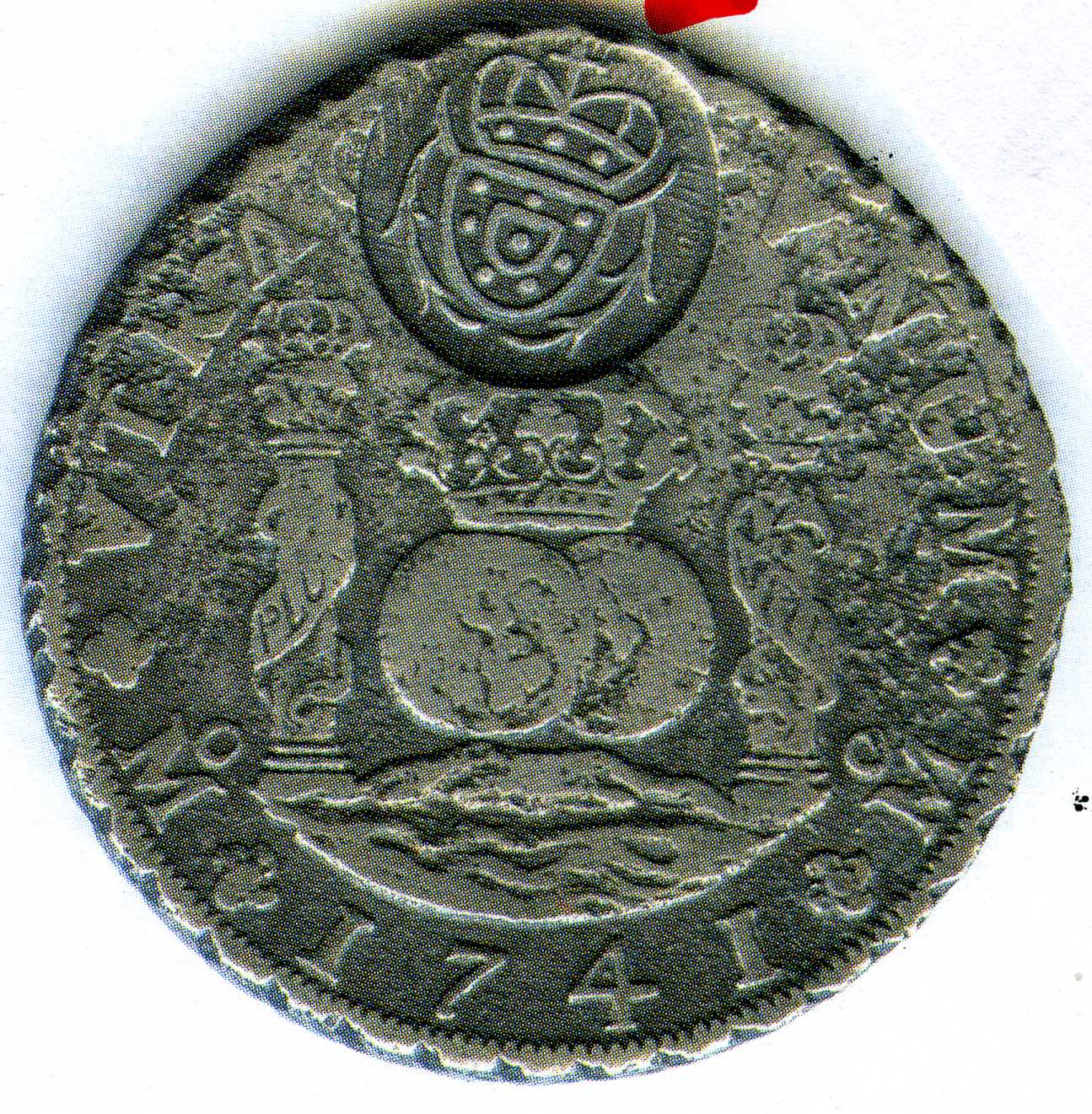
India

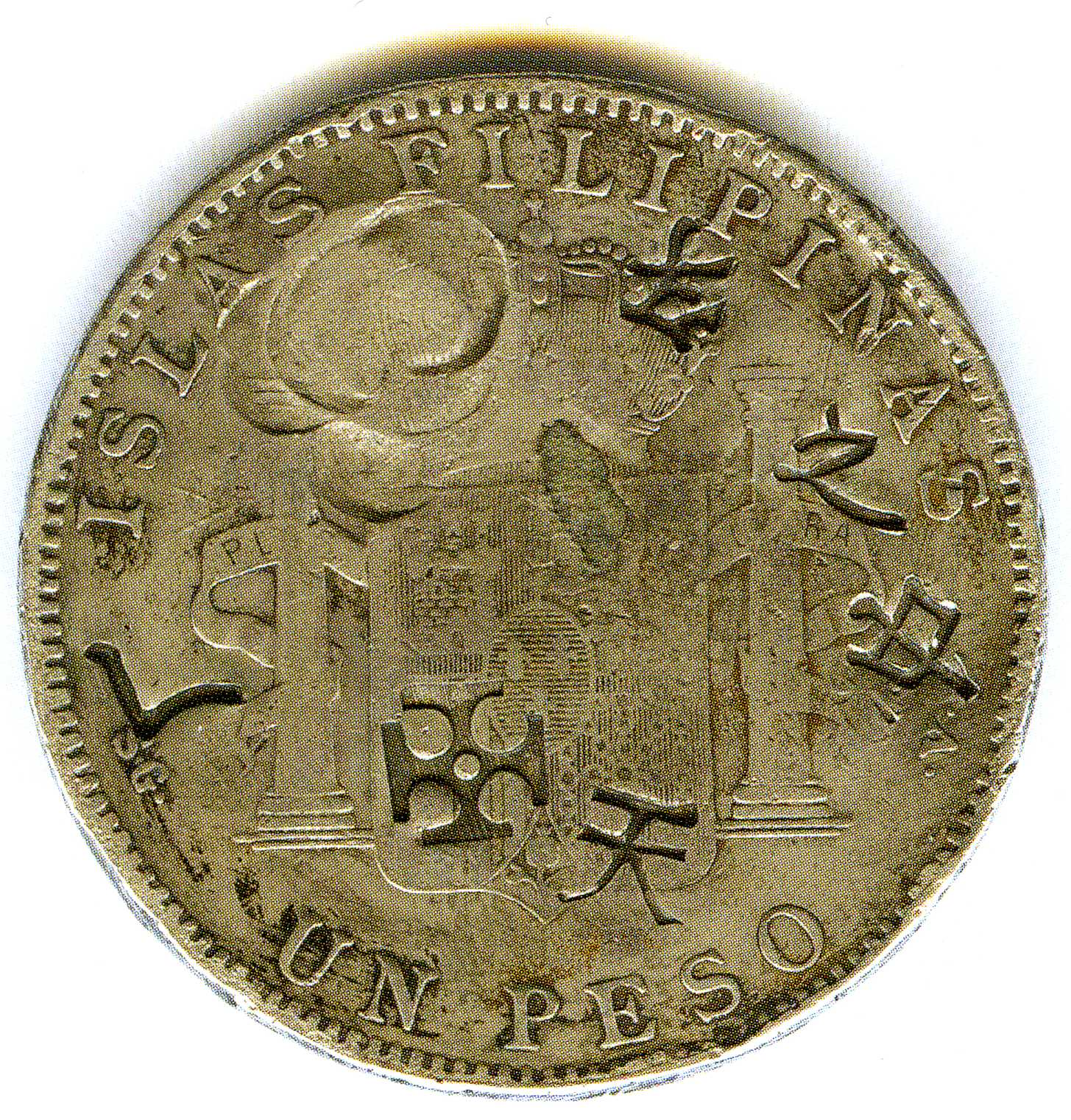
Timor

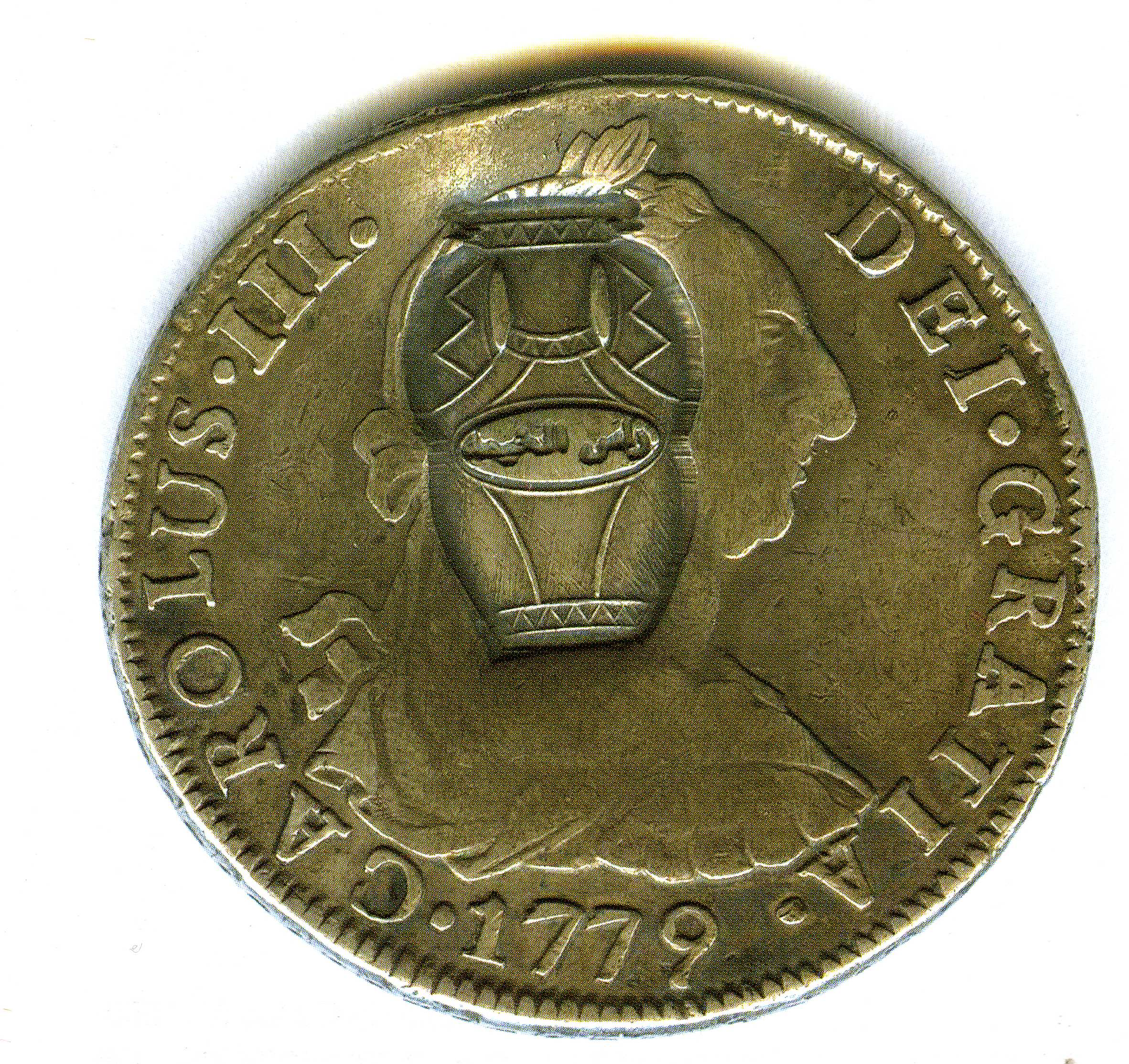
United Arab Emirates

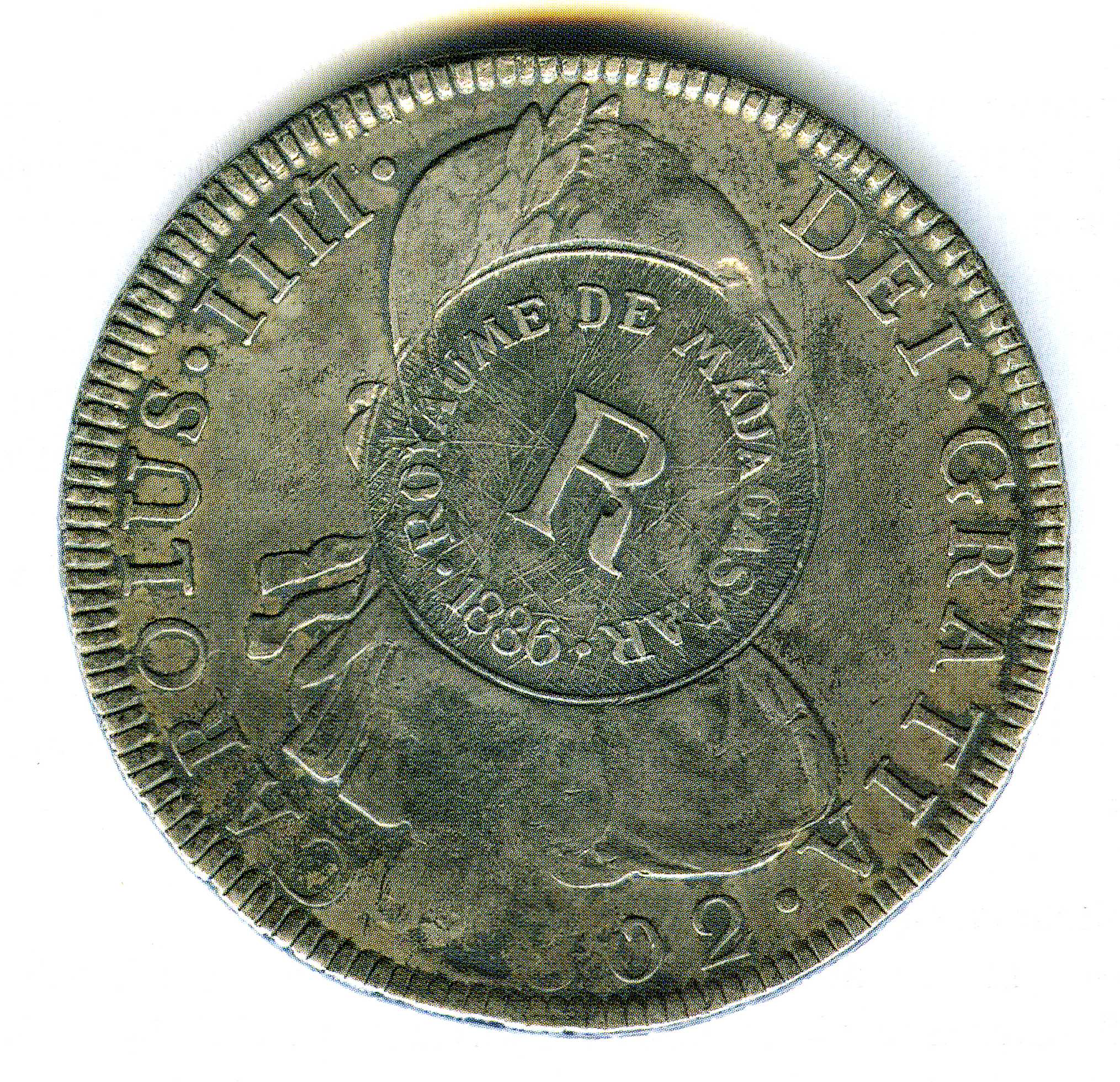
Madagascar

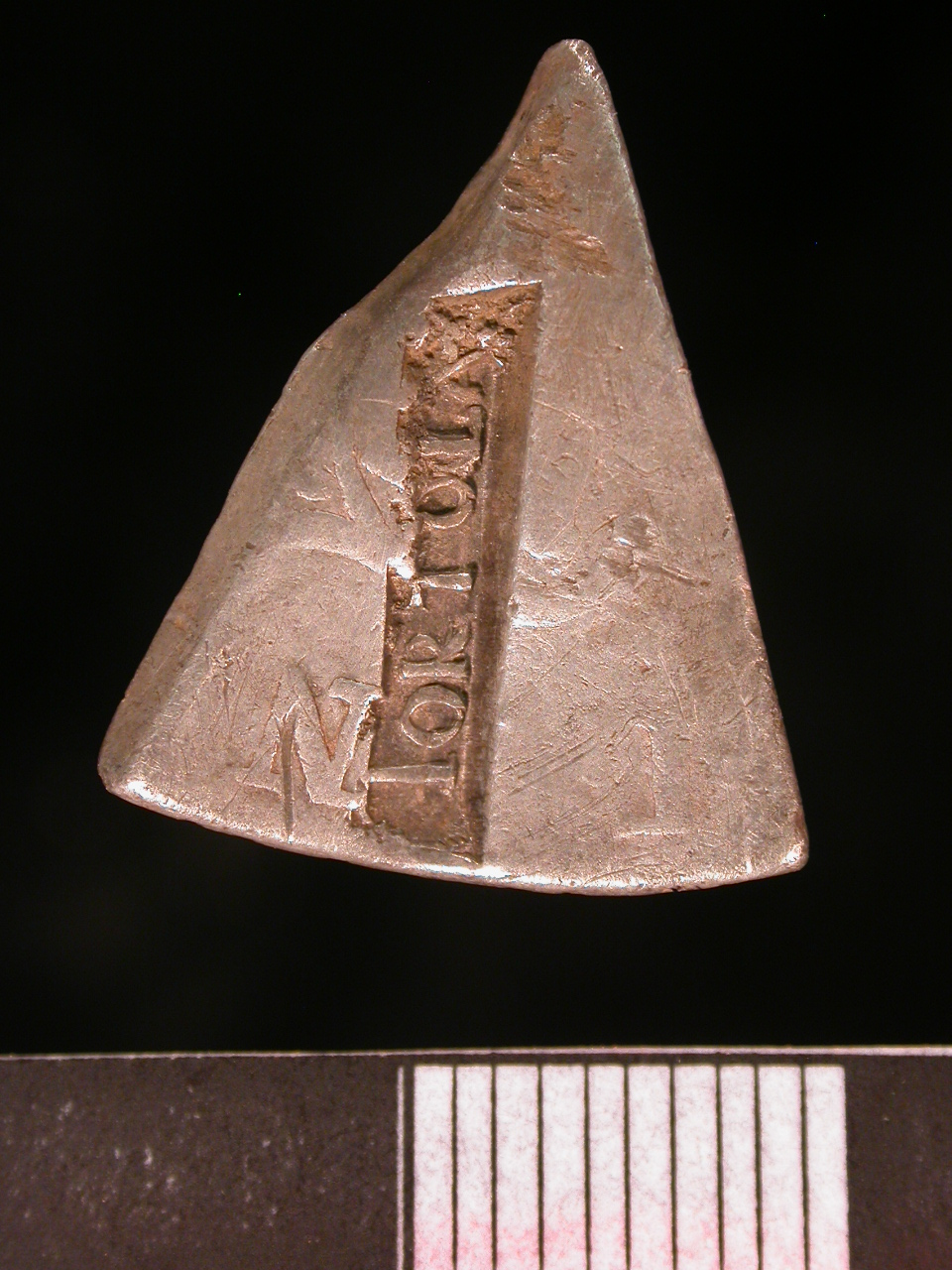
One-eighth of a Spanish dollar, British West Indies (Tortola)

== Fiction ==
In modern pop culture and fiction, pieces of eight are most often associated with the popular notion of pirates.

- In Robert Louis Stevenson's Treasure Island, Long John Silver's parrot has learned to cry out "Pieces of eight!" This use tied the coin (and parrots) to fictional depictions of pirates. Deriving from the wide popularity of this book, "pieces of eight" is sometimes used to mean "money" or "a lot of money", regardless of specific denomination, and also as a synonym for treasure in general.
- In Terry Pratchett's Going Postal, the antagonist, Reacher Gilt (who physically resembles a stereotypical pirate), has a cockatoo named Alphonse which has been trained to say "Twelve and half percent!", that is to say a single piece of eight.

== See also ==
- Doubloon – Two-escudo or 32-real gold coin
- Columnarios – Spanish colonial coinage
- Maria Theresa thaler – Silver bullion coin
- Piastre – Unit of currency
