= Real de plata =

Real de plata is a Spanish term, translated as: "silver real", a historic silver coin and standard currency.

- Spanish colonial real Spanish: real de plata; currency standard and silver coin; eight to the Spanish dollar
- Mexican real, a silver Spanish colonial real coin or a silver standard coin and currency of Mexico 1822-1897
- Spanish real, a historic silver coin
- Philippine real, a silver Spanish colonial real coin or a silver coin of the Philippines 19th century
- Paraguayan real, a silver Spanish colonial real coin or a silver coin of Paraguay 19th century
- Peruvian real, a silver Spanish colonial real coin or a silver coin of Peru 19th century
- Ecuadorian real, a silver Spanish colonial real coin or a silver coin of Ecuador 19th century
- Honduran real, a silver Spanish colonial real coin or a silver coin of Honduras 19th century
- Costa Rican real, a silver Spanish colonial real coin or a silver coin of Costa Rica 19th century
- Central American Republic real, currency standard and silver coin of the Central American Republic
