= Central American Republic real =

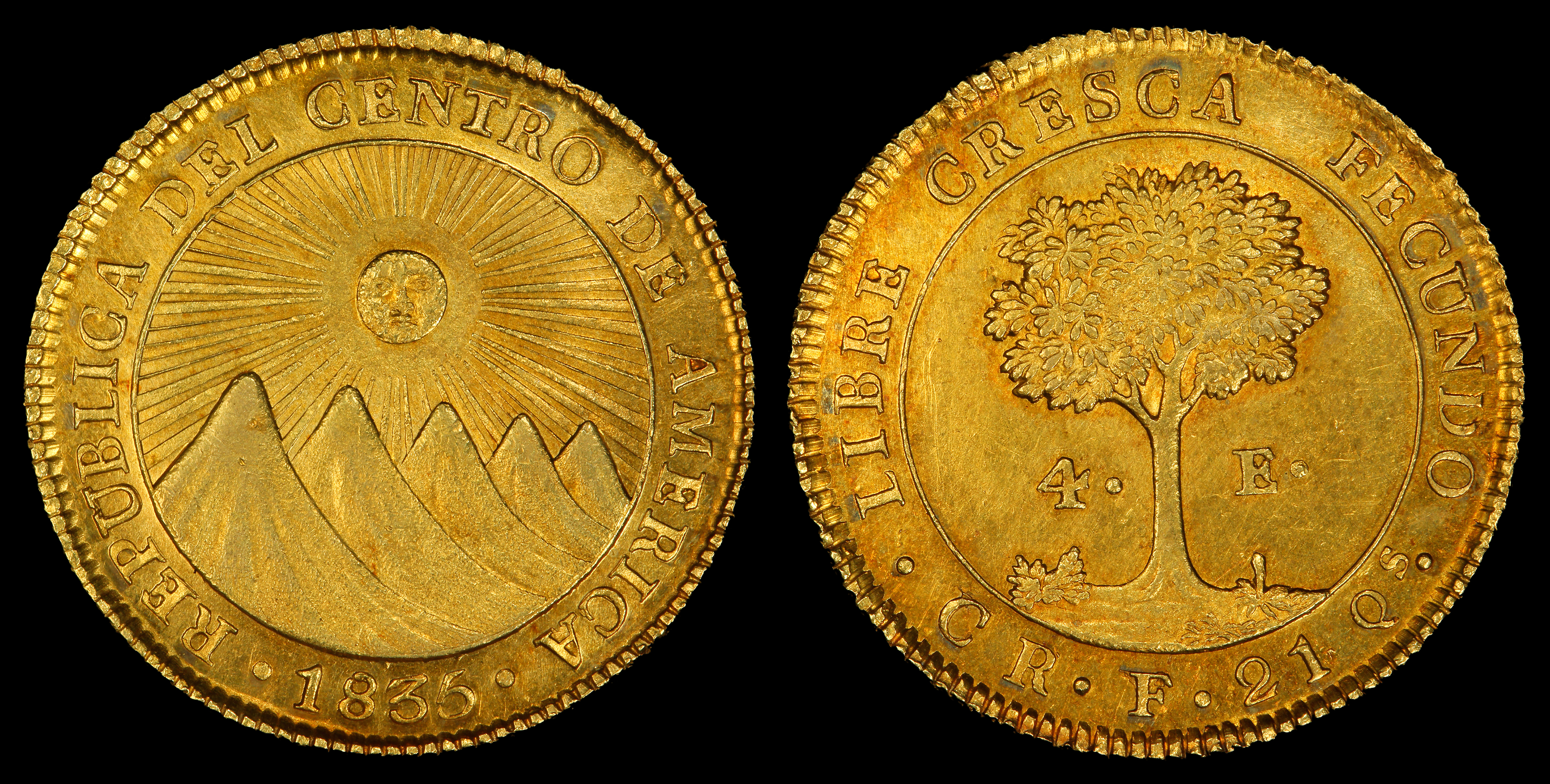
Central American Republic, 4 Escudos (1835). Struck in the San Jose, Costa Rica mint (697 were minted).

The real was the currency of the Federal Republic of Central America from the passing of the coinage law of 19 March 1824 to the dissolution of the republic in 1838. Sixteen silver reales equaled one gold escudo, and a coin of eight reales was called a peso. The Central American Republic's real replaced the Spanish colonial real at par and continued to circulate and be issued after the constituent states left the Central American Republic. Federation coins were minted in Guatemala, Costa Rica, and Honduras, while additional provisional issues were minted at various points in Costa Rica, Honduras, and El Salvador. Both Guatemala and Costa Rica continued minting coins in the style of the republican real until the late 1840s; the currency was eventually replaced by the Costa Rican real, Salvadoran peso, Guatemalan peso, Honduran real and Nicaraguan peso.

== History ==
The numismatic history of the Federal Republic begins with the passage of the coinage law of 19 March 1824. This law, titled Ley Que Prohibe la Acunacion de Moneda con las Armas de la Monarquia Espanola y Designa el Nuevo Tipo de Monedas de la Republica, banned the production of any coin with features distinctive of the Spanish monarchy and also described the appearance of new coinage. The law states coins should be produced in gold and silver, featuring reverses with the motto Libre Crezca Fecundo and a Ceiba tree as a symbol of liberty. The coins obverses were to feature a series of volcanos and a radiant sun, with the sun to appear rising on the silver coins and fully risen on the gold. The five volcanos are typically taken to represent the five provinces of the republic. Due to their diminutive size, quarter and half real pieces were permitted by law to feature only three volcanos.

=== Provisional coinage ===
Master dies were prepared in Guatemala and eventually sent to the mints in Costa Rica and Tegucigalpa, Honduras. However before such dies could arrive, both mints took it upon themselves to hand carve dies and strike coins in gold and silver dated 1824 and 1825. These issues were very inconsistent in their weight and appearance, and as such were eventually demonetized in 1833 by the central government. Records indicate that between 10,900 and 17,000 pesos worth of provisional gold was melted during a three month period at this time. As of 2017, fewer than 10 surviving examples of provisional gold are known to numismatists.

== Coins ==
=== Guatemala mint ===
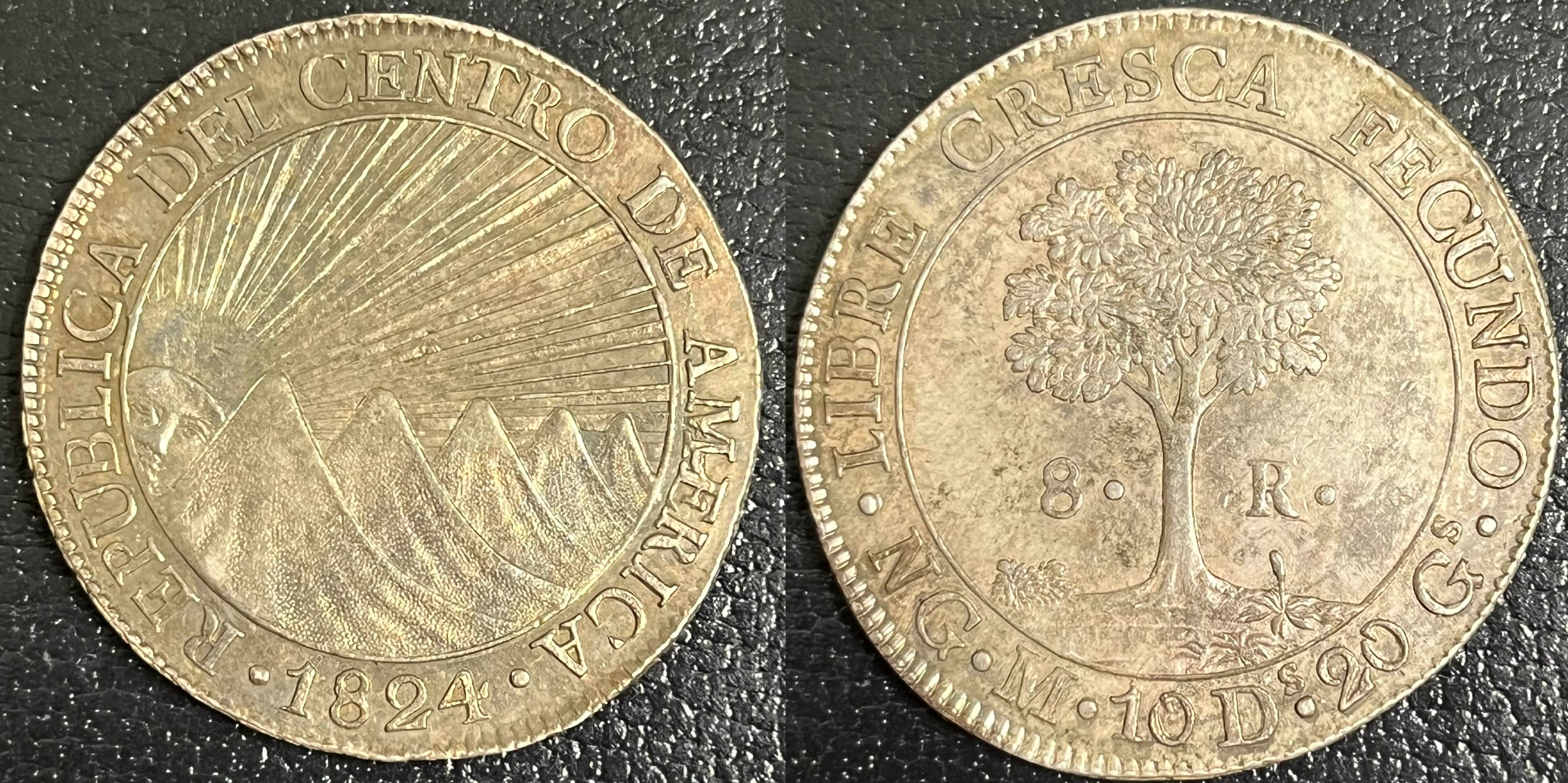
The NG mintmark on the reverse of this 8 reales coin indicates it was minted at the Nueva Guatemala (Guatemala City) mint. M is the initial of the assayer, Miguel Muñoz. The fineness of the metal, measured in dineros and granos is also indicated on the legend as 10 Ds 20 Gs. This is approximately 90.27% silver.

The mint in Guatemala produced gold and silver coins for the republic from 1824–1841. The mint in Guatemala produced silver coins in denominations of 1/4, 1/2, 1, and 8 reales, and gold coins in denominations of 1, 2, 4, and 8 escudos. Guatemala did not formally secede from the republic until 1847 and continued producing republican 8 reales from 1841–1847.

=== Costa Rica mint ===
The mint in Costa Rica produced gold and silver coins for the republic from 1824–1838, and continued to produce gold coins in the republican style after forming an independent state. Costa Rica produced gold in denominations of 1/2, 1, 2, 4, and 8 escudos and silver coins in denominations of 1/4, 1/2, 1 and 8 reales. Much of the Costa Rican silver mintage was produced exclusively in 1831.

=== Honduras mint ===
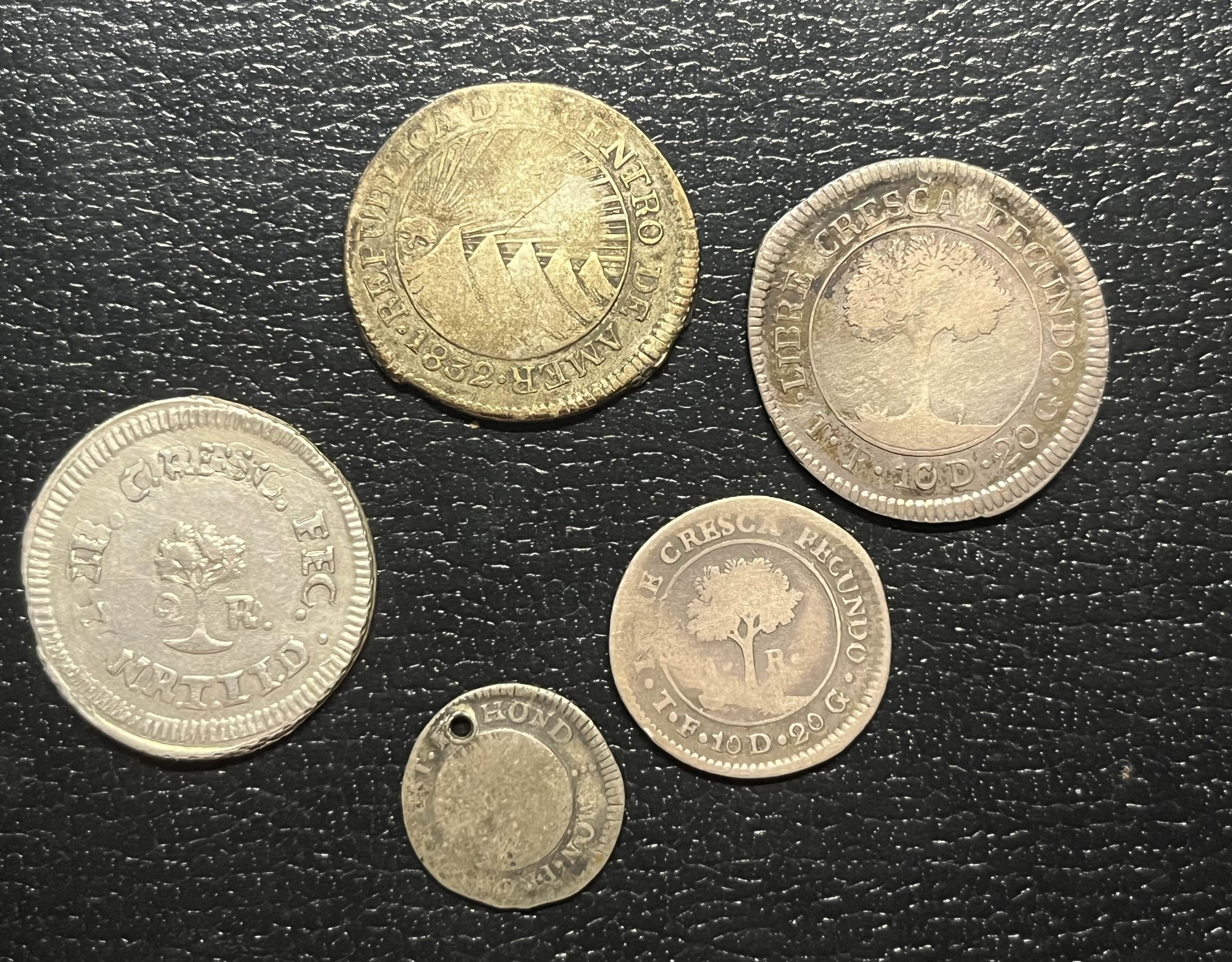
A selection of coinage minted at the Tegucigalpa mint during the period of the Central American Republic.

The mint at Tegucigalpa, Honduras produced silver coins from 1824-1824 and from 1830–1832 in denominations of 1 real and 2 reales. After 1832, the mint in Honduras produced debased coinage from copper and lead alloys in various denominations. The issues of 1824 and 1825 were considered nonstandard by the central government in Guatemala, and a law dictating minting operations cease in Tegucigalpa until improved dies could be delivered was passed in 1825.
