= Honduran lempira =

Currency of Honduras

lempira hondureño (Spanish)
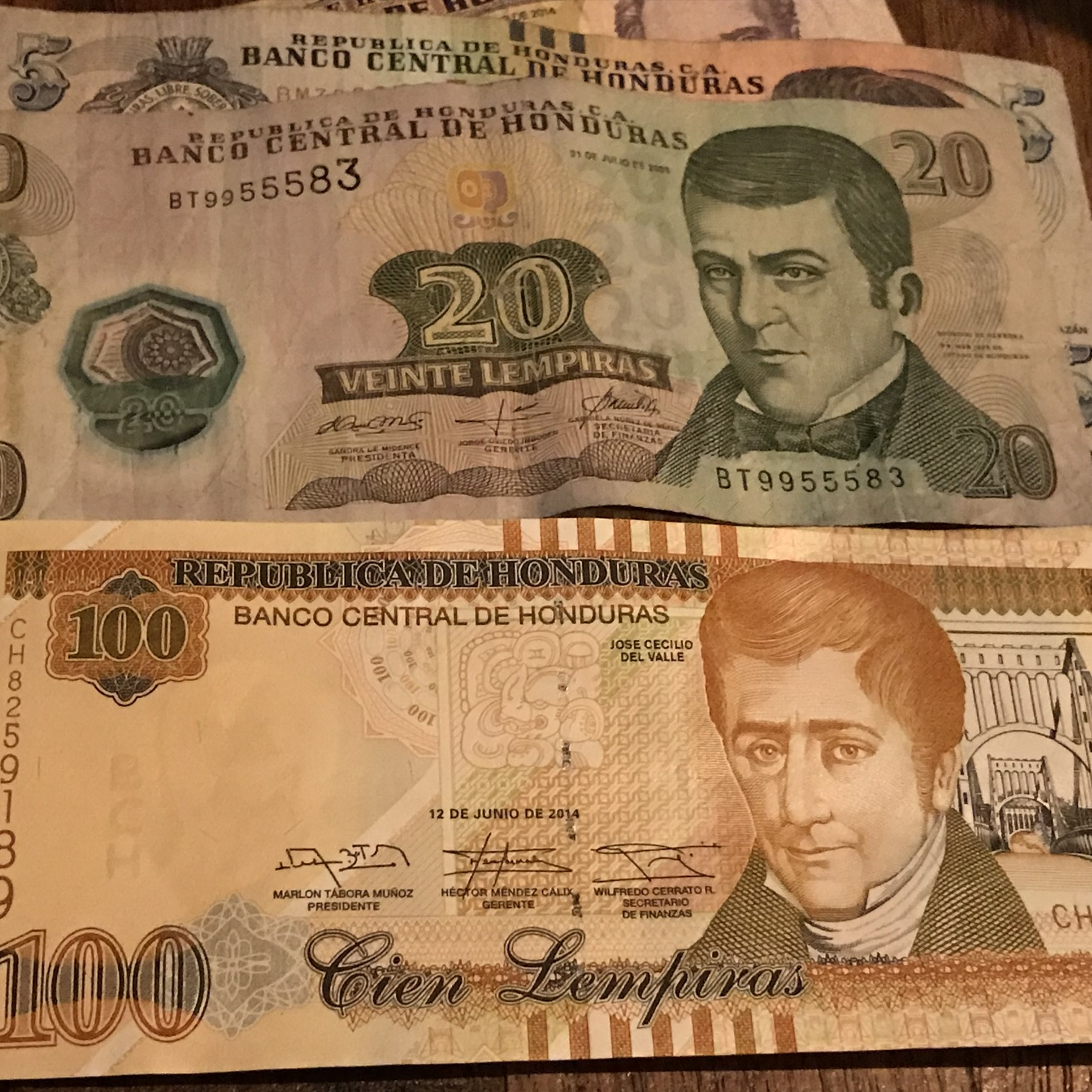
- 20 and 100 lempira banknotes

ISO 4217
- Code: HNL (numeric: 340)
- Subunit: 0.01

Unit
- Symbol: L

Denominations
- Banknotes: L1, L2, L5, L10, L20, L50, L100, L200, L500
- Coins: 5, 10, 20, 50 centavos

Demographics
- Date of introduction: 1931
- Replaced: Honduran peso
- User(s): Honduras

Issuance
- Central bank: Central Bank of Honduras
- Website: www.bch.hn
- Printer: Polish Security Printing Works
- Website: Polska Wytwórnia Papierów Wartościowych

Valuation
- Inflation: 3.46%
- Source: Central Bank of Honduras, February 2026.

The lempira (Spanish pronunciation: [lemˈpiɾa], sign: L; code: HNL) is the currency of Honduras. It is subdivided into 100 centavos.

== Etymology ==
The lempira was named after the 16th-century cacique Lempira, a ruler of the indigenous Lenca people, who is renowned in Honduran folklore for leading the local native resistance against the Spanish conquistador forces. He is a national hero, honored on both the 1 lempira note and 20 and 50 centavos coins.

== History ==
The lempira was introduced in 1931, replacing the peso at par. Until the March 1990 devaluation, the official exchange rate was two lempiras to the United States dollar (the 20-centavos coin is called a daime as it was worth the same as a U.S. dime). As of July, 2026, the lempira was quoted at 26.8 HNL to US$1.

== Coins ==
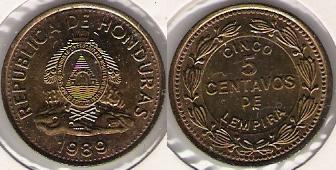
5 centavos coin minted in 1989

In 1931, coins were introduced in denominations of 5, 20 & 50 centavos, and 1 lempira. One, 2 and 10 centavos coins were added in 1935, 1939 and 1932, respectively. The silver 1 lempira coins ceased production in 1937, with the other silver coins (20 & 50 centavos) replaced by cupro-nickel in 1967. The 1 and 2 centavos coins were last minted in 1998 and 1974, respectively.

Coins of the following denominations are currently legal tender. However as of 2024 coins are only very rarely used for payments. In practice only banknotes are used.

- 1 centavo
- 2 centavos
- 5 centavos
- 10 centavos
- 20 centavos
- 50 centavos

== Banknotes ==
The Bank of Honduras and the Banco Atlantida issued the first lempira banknotes in 1932. They were in denominations of 1, 2, 5, 10 and 20 lempiras. The Central Bank of Honduras took over production of paper money in 1950, introducing 50 and 100 lempiras notes in 1950, followed by the 500-lempiras note in 1995.

In January, 2010, a new 20-lempira note was introduced to market made by a polymer base, 60 million notes were issued.

In celebration of the bicentennial anniversary of Honduras's independence, a new 200 lempira bill was issued. It features 2 scarlet macaws, the national bird of Honduras.

Banknotes in circulation are

Image	New	Value	Color	Dimensions	Obverse	Reverse
		L1	Red	156 × 67 mm	Lempira	Copán
		L2	Purple	156 × 67 mm	Marco Aurelio Soto	Amapala
		L5	Gray	156 × 67 mm	Francisco Morazán	Battle of La Trinidad
		L10	Brown	156 × 67 mm	José Trinidad Cabañas	Universidad Nacional Autónoma de Honduras
		L20	Green	156 × 67 mm	Dionisio de Herrera	Presidential palace
		L50	Blue	156 × 67 mm	Juan Manuel Gálvez	Central Bank of Honduras
		L100	Orange	156 × 67 mm	José Cecilio del Valle	Casa Valle
		L200	Turquoise	156 × 67 mm	2 Scarlet Macaws	Banco Central de Honduras
		L500	Violet	156 × 67 mm	Ramón Rosa	San Juancito

== Exchange rates ==
Current HNL exchange rates
From Google Finance:	AUD CAD CHF CNY EUR GBP HKD JPY USD INR TWD EUR
From Yahoo! Finance:	AUD CAD CHF CNY EUR GBP HKD JPY USD INR TWD EUR
From XE.com:	AUD CAD CHF CNY EUR GBP HKD JPY USD INR TWD EUR
From OANDA:	AUD CAD CHF CNY EUR GBP HKD JPY USD INR TWD EUR

== See also ==
- Economy of Honduras
