= Costa Rican real =

Former currency of Costa Rica

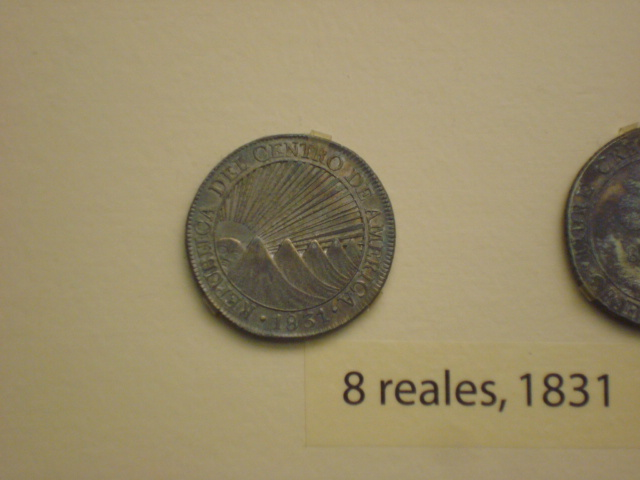

The real was the currency of Costa Rica until 1850 and continued to circulate until 1864. It had no subdivisions. 16 silver reales equaled 1 gold escudo. The real was replaced by the peso at a rate of 1 peso = 8 reales.

Initially, Spanish and Spanish colonial reales circulated, followed in 1824 by the Central American Republic real. In 1842, Costa Rica issued its first coins, 1/2 real and 1 escudo pieces. These were followed in 1847 by 1 real coins. In 1850, when the first peso coins were issued, gold coins were issued for 1/2, 1 and 2 escudos. The last coins denominated in reales were issued in 1850, whilst the last escudo coins were issued in 1864.
