= Guatemalan quetzal =

Currency of Guatemala

quetzal guatemalteco (Spanish)
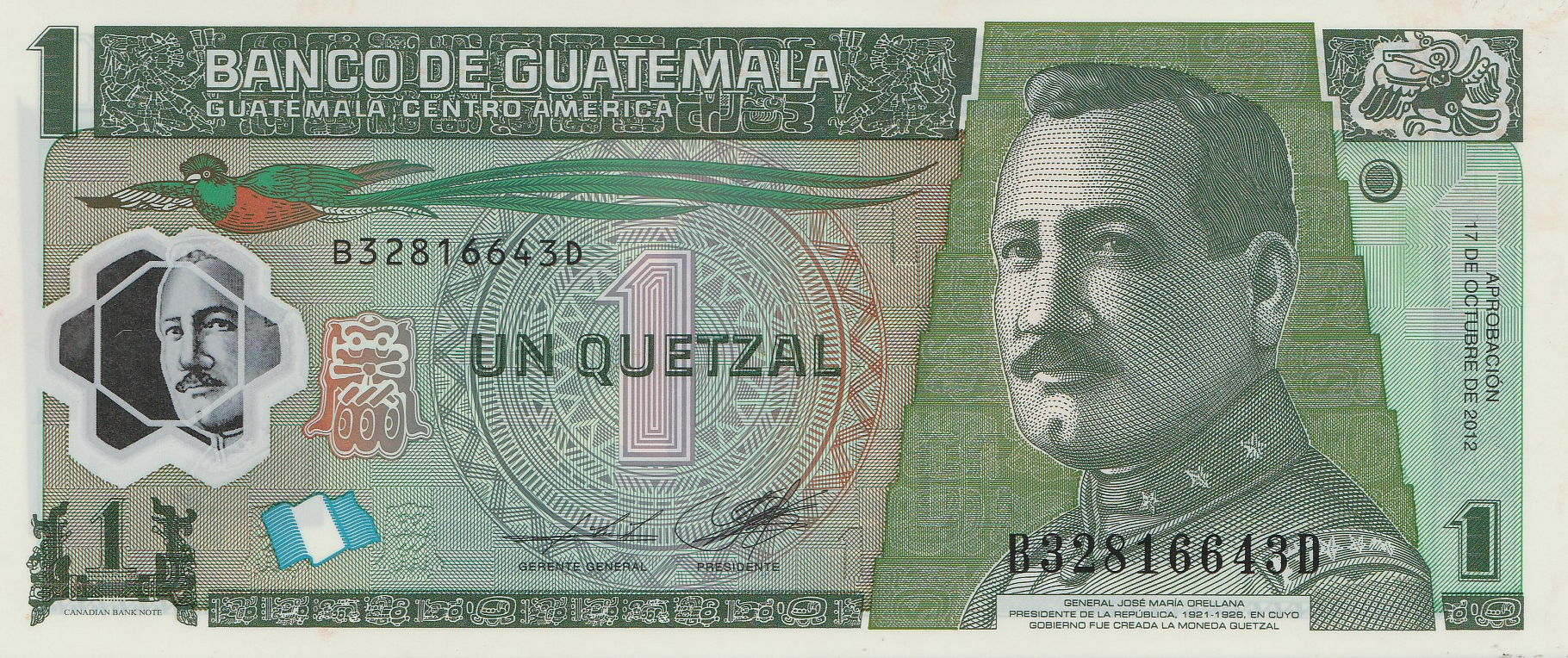
- Q1 banknote displaying José María Orellana

ISO 4217
- Code: GTQ (numeric: 320)
- Subunit: 0.01

Unit
- Plural: quetzales
- Symbol: Q

Denominations
- Subunit
- 1/100: centavo
- Banknotes: 1, 5, 10, 20, 50, 100, 200 quetzales
- Coins: 5, 10, 25, 50 centavos, 1 quetzal

Demographics
- Date of introduction: 1925
- Replaced: Guatemalan peso
- User(s): Guatemala

Issuance
- Central bank: Bank of Guatemala
- Website: www.banguat.gob.gt

Valuation
- Inflation: 6.2%
- Source: Link

The quetzal (locally [keˈtsal]; code: GTQ) is the currency of Guatemala, named after the national bird of Guatemala, the resplendent quetzal. In ancient Mayan culture, the quetzal bird's tail feathers were used as currency. It is divided into 100 centavos, or len (plural lenes) in Guatemalan slang. The plural is quetzales.

== History ==
The quetzal was introduced in 1925 during the term of President José María Orellana, whose image appears on the obverse of the one-quetzal bill. It replaced the Guatemalan peso at the rate of 60 pesos = 1 quetzal. Until 1987, the quetzal was pegged to and domestically equal to the United States dollar. The currency was named after the country's famous bird, the Quetzal, which is also on the flag of Guatemala.

== Coins ==
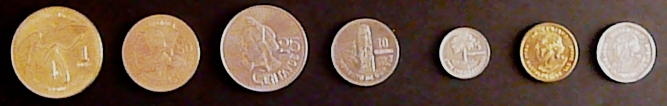
Coins of the quetzal

In 1925, coins in denominations of 1, 5, 10 centavos, 1/4, 1/2 and 1 quetzal were introduced, although the majority of the 1 quetzal coins were withdrawn from circulation and melted. 1/2 and 2 centavo coins were added in 1932. Until 1965, coins of 5 centavos and above were minted in 72% silver. 1/2 and 1 quetzal coins were reintroduced in 1998 and 1999, respectively.

The coins currently in circulation are disc-shaped and include Guatemala's national coat of arms on the obverse. The coins, and their reverse designs are:

- 5 centavos: the tree of liberty and the motto "LIBRE CREZCA FECUNDO (Grow free and fecund)"
- 10 centavos: a monolith from Quiriguá
- 25 centavos: an indigenous woman, Concepción Ramírez
- 50 centavos: Monja Blanca, the national flower
- 1 quetzal: a stylized dove, the word "Paz (Peace)", and the date “29 de Diciembre de 1996 (29 December 1996)”

== Banknotes ==
The first banknotes were issued by the Central Bank of Guatemala in denominations of 1, 2, 5, 10, 20 and 100 quetzales, with 1/2 quetzal notes added in 1933. In 1946, the Bank of Guatemala took over the issuance of paper money, with the first issues being overprints on notes of the Central Bank. Except for the introduction of 50 quetzal notes in 1967, the denominations of banknotes remained unchanged until 1/2 and 1 quetzal coins replaced notes at the end of the 1990s.

In the top-right corner of the obverse face of each banknote, the value is displayed in Mayan numerals, representing Guatemala's cultural history.

Banknotes in circulation
Image		Value	Main Color	Description		Remark
Obverse	Reverse	Value	Main Color	Obverse	Reverse	Remark
		Q1	Green	José María Orellana, President of Guatemala during the Currency Reform that introduced the Quetzal as the official currency.	Main building of the Central Bank of Guatemala	Reintroduced as a polymer banknote on August 20, 2007. A Commemorative paper note was introduced in 2024 to celebrate 100 years of the quetzal.
		Q5	Violet	Justo Rufino Barrios, Co-Leader of the Liberal Revolution of 1871.	Education allegory	Changed to a polymer banknote on November 14, 2011 Subsequently reintroduced on a cotton paper substrate.
		Q10	Red	Miguel García Granados, Deputy and Main Leader of the Liberal Revolution of 1871.	Picture from the Guatemalan National Assembly of 1872	
		Q20	Blue	Mariano Gálvez, State Leader of the State of Guatemala, within the United Provinces of Central America.	Signing of the declaration of Central American independence	
		Q50	Orange	Carlos O. Zachrisson, finance minister from 1923 to 1926	Allegory of the importance of coffee to the country	
		Q100	Sepia	Francisco Marroquín, First Bishop of the Realm of Guatemala, and Founder of the Universidad de San Carlos de Guatemala	First university building in Antigua Guatemala	
		Q200	Aqua	Sebastian Hurtado, Mariano Valverde, German Alcántara. Three marimba composers.	Allegory of the marimba, the national instrument, Musical score of La Flor del Café by Alcántara.	A new version of the Q200 note was introduced in 2022 and features a SPARK security patch.
For table standards, see the banknote specification table.

The Bank of Guatemala has introduced a polymer banknote of 1 quetzal on August 20, 2007, followed by a 5 quetzal polymer banknote on November 14, 2011. Both the 1 and 5 quetzal notes are once again on a paper substrate as of 2024.

== Out of circulation ==
The fifty-cent quetzal bill is out of circulation, but it still has value.

Fifty-Cent Quetzal Banknote
Image		Value	Main Color	Description		Remark
Obverse	Reverse	Value	Main Color	Obverse	Reverse	Remark
		Q0.50	Brown	Tecún Umán, Prince and Commander-and-Chief of the Quiche Realm during the Spanish Conquest.	Tikal's Temple I	No longer in circulation
For table standards, see the banknote specification table.

== Exchange rate ==
Current GTQ exchange rates
From Google Finance:	AUD CAD CHF CNY EUR GBP HKD JPY USD MXN
From Yahoo! Finance:	AUD CAD CHF CNY EUR GBP HKD JPY USD MXN
From XE.com:	AUD CAD CHF CNY EUR GBP HKD JPY USD MXN
From OANDA:	AUD CAD CHF CNY EUR GBP HKD JPY USD MXN

== See also ==
- Economy of Guatemala
