= Ecuadorian real =

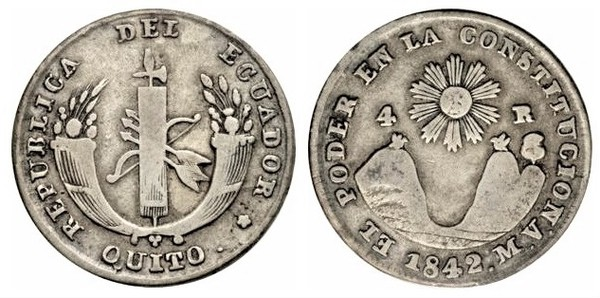
Four-real coin from 1842

The real was the currency of Ecuador until 1871. There were no subdivisions but 16 silver reales equalled 1 gold escudo, with the 8 reales coin known as a peso.

== History ==
Until 1822, the Spanish colonial real circulated, followed by the Colombian real. Ecuador introduced its own coinage in 1833, with the Ecuadorian real replacing the earlier currencies at par. In 1856, the currency was pegged to the French franc, with 8 reales = 5 francs (1 real = 62½ centimes). From 1862, banknotes were issued denominated in pesos and reales. The real was replaced by the peso in 1871 at a rate of 8 reales = 1 peso.

== Coins ==
Silver coins were issued in denominations of ¼, ½, 1, 2, 4 and 8 reales, 1, 2, 4 and 8 escudos. In 1858, a coin denominated as 5 francos was issued. This was worth 8 reales and was issued to indicate the currency's link to the French franc. Coinage production was suspended in 1862.

== Banknotes ==
Private banks issued paper money denominated in reales between 1862 and 1871. For details, see Ecuadorian peso.

== See also ==
- Ecuadorian peso
- Ecuadorian sucre
- Economy of Ecuador
