= Honduran real =

The real was the currency of Honduras until 1862. Before 1824, the Spanish colonial real circulated, followed by the Central American Republic real. Sixteen silver reales equalled one gold escudo.

Honduras's own real was introduced in 1832. Coins were issued in denominations of 1/2, 1, 2, 4 and 8 reales. The first issues were minted in 33.3% silver but severe debasement followed, leading to an issue in 1853 containing just 4% silver. This was followed in 1855 and 1856 by an issue in copper and then an issue between 1857 and 1861 in a copper-lead alloy.

The real was replaced by the peso at a rate of 8 reales = 1 peso. The real continued as the subdivision of the peso until 1871.
