= Honduran peso =

Former currency of Honduras

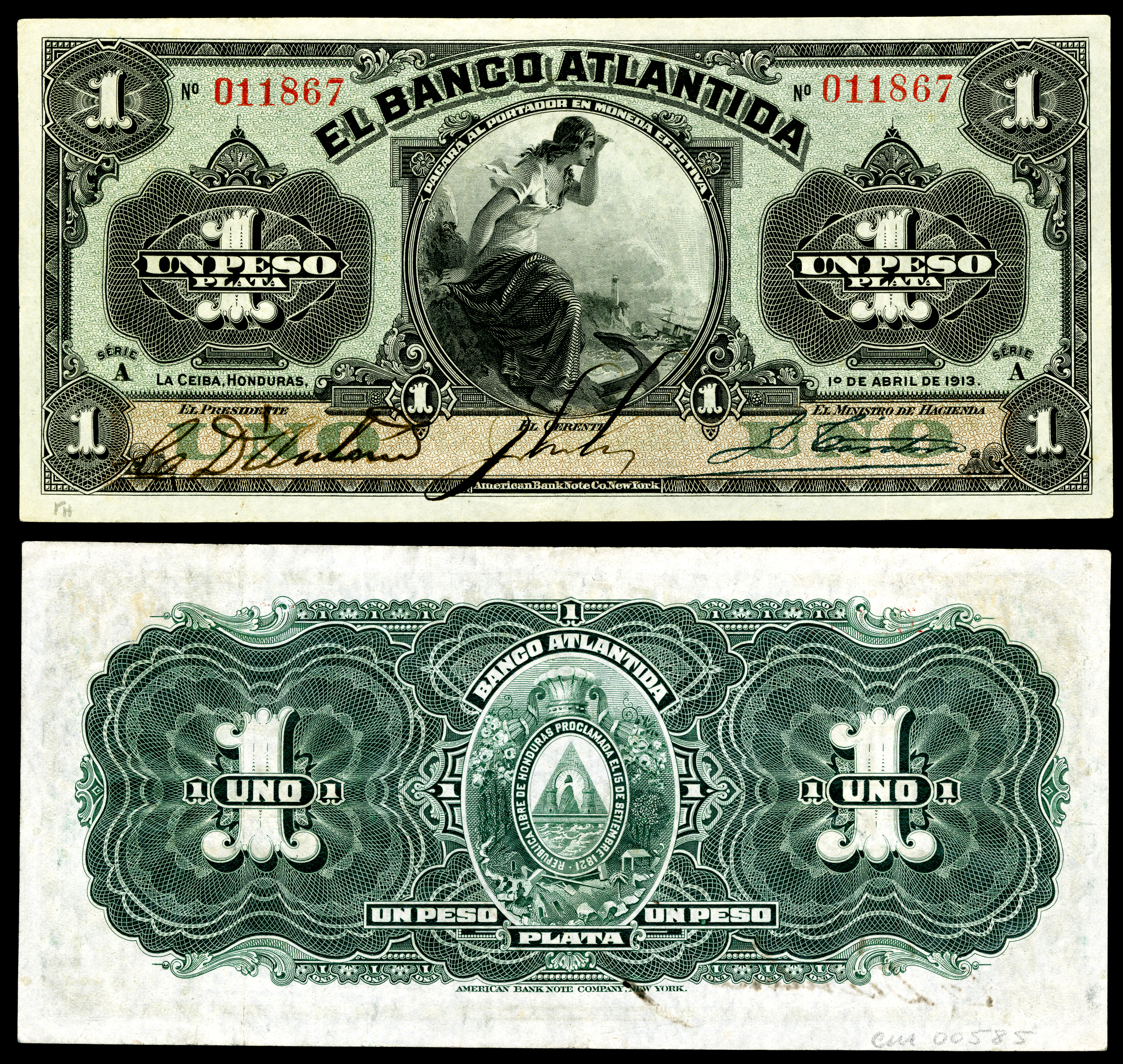
Banco Atlantida, Honduras 1 Peso banknote (1913)

The peso was the currency of Honduras between 1862 and 1931.

== History ==
The peso replaced the real at a rate of 1 peso = 8 reales. Initially, the peso was subdivided into 8 reales. In 1871, the currency was decimalized, with the peso subdivided into 100 centavos. The peso was replaced in 1931 by the lempira at par.

== Coins ==
The first coin issues in 1862 were a provisional copper coinage in denominations of 1, 2, 4 and 8 pesos. This was followed between 1869 and 1871 by a cupro-nickel coinage in denominations of 1/8, 1/4, 1/2 and 1 real.

Silver 5, 10, 25 and 50 centavos and gold 1 peso coins were introduced that in 1871 following decimalization. Bronze 1 centavo coins were introduced in 1878, with bronze 2 centavos and silver 1 pesos added in 1881. Gold 5, 10 and 20 pesos coins were introduced between 1883 and 1889.

== Banknotes ==
In 1886, the Aguan Navigation and Improvement Company issued its first paper money. The Banco Centro-Americano began note production in 1888, followed by the Honduran government in 1889, with several more banks issuing notes later. Denominations ranged between 50 centavos and 100 pesos.
