= Ecuadorian peso =

Former currency of Ecuador

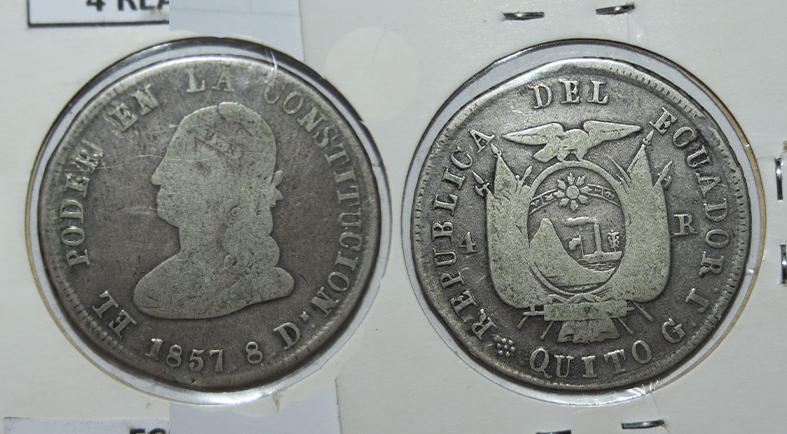
A 4-real silver coin

The peso served as Ecuador's currency until 1884.

== History ==
The peso was the name of the eight real coins that have been circulating in Ecuador since the Spanish colonial period. In 1856, the currency was pegged to the French franc, with 1 peso = 5 francs. From 1862 on, paper money was issued, denominated in reals and pesos. The peso was formally adopted as the currency of Ecuador in 1871, replacing the real at a rate of 1 peso = 8 reales. It was subdivided into 100 centavos. In 1884, the peso was replaced by the sucre at par.

== Coins ==
The only coins issued between 1871 and 1884 were 1 and 2 centavos, struck in cupro-nickel at the Heaton mint in Birmingham. These coins continued to circulate after the sucre was adopted.

== Banknotes ==
Paper money was only issued by private banks. The Banco Particular de Descuento y Circulación de Guayaquil issued notes between 1862 and 1866 in denominations of 2 and 4 reales and 1, 5, 10, 20, 50, and 100 pesos. The Banco del Ecuador issued denominations of 2 and 4 reales and 1, 4, 5, and 10 pesos between 1868 and 1887. Some 1 and 5 peso notes were later overprinted for use as 80 centavo and 4 sucre notes, due to a conversion rate of 5 pesos = 4 sucres for the notes of this bank.

The Banco de Circulación y Descuento issued 4 real and 1, 4, 5, 10, and 20 peso notes in the 1860s, whilst the Banco Nacional issued notes in the 1870s in denominations of 2 and 4 reales and 1, 5, 10, 20, and 100 pesos. The Banco de Quito issued notes in denominations of 2 reales and 1, 5, 10, 20, and 100 pesos between 1874 and 1880; the Banco de la Unión issued notes between 1882 and 1893 in denominations of 1, 5, 10, 20, and 100 pesos; and the Banco Anglo-Ecuatoriano issued notes in 1884 for 1, 5, and 10 pesos.

== See also ==
- Ecuadorian real
- Ecuadorian sucre
- Economy of Ecuador
