= Guatemalan peso =

Historical currency of Guatemala

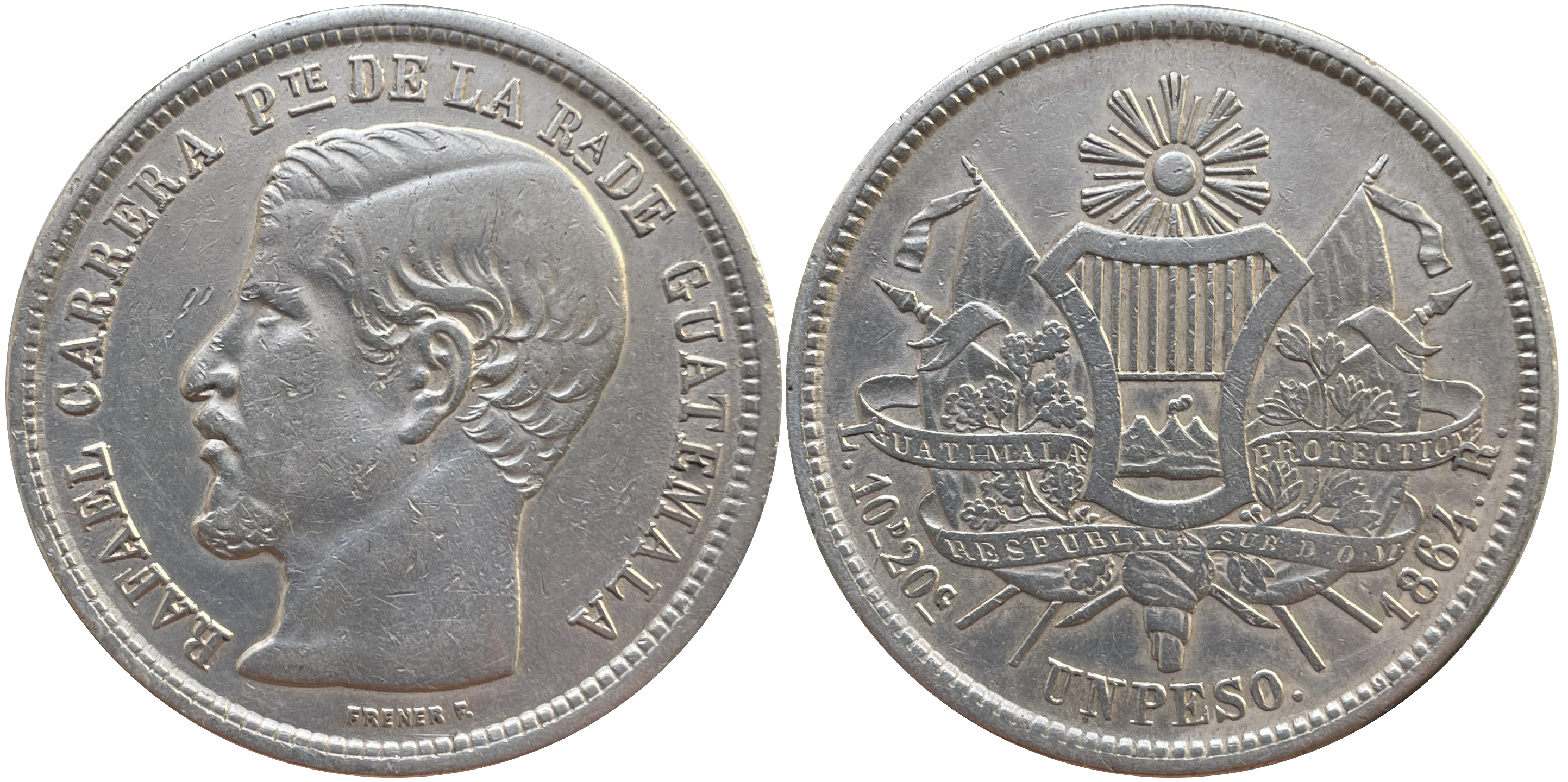
1 Guatemalan Peso with an image of Rafael Carrera, 1864

The peso was the currency of Guatemala between 1859 and 1925.

== History ==
The peso replaced the real, with 1 peso = 8 reales. In 1869, the centavo was introduced, worth one hundredth of a peso, but the real continued to be produced until 1912, when Guatemala fully decimalized. In 1870, the peso was pegged to the French franc at a rate of 1 peso = 5 francs. However, convertibility was suspended in 1895, and as more pesos were issued as fiat money, the peso's value fell considerably. The peso was replaced by the quetzal in 1925 at the rate of 60 pesos = 1 quetzal.

== Coins ==
Silver coins were initially issued in denominations of ¼, ½, 1, 2 and 4 reales and 1 peso, whilst gold coins were issued in denominations of 4 reales, 1, 2, 4, 8 and 16 pesos. With the introduction of the centavo in 1869, came denominations of 1, 25 and 50 centavos, 5, 10 and 20 pesos. 5 and 10 centavos coins were added in 1881.

Following the suspension of the peso's peg to the French franc and convertibility to silver, the issuance of silver coins ceased in 1900, as the currency's value fell. A 1 real nickel coin was issued until 1912. Between 1915 and 1923, provisional coins were issued, in denominations of 12½ and 25 centavos in 1915, and 50 centavos in 1922, and 1 and 5 pesos in 1923.
