= Costa Rican peso =

Former currency of Costa Rica

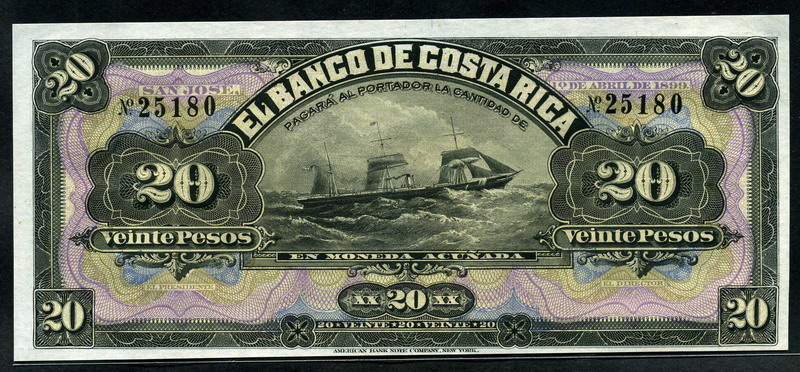
20 Pesos banknote of 1899, Banco de Costa Rica.

The peso was the currency of Costa Rica between 1850 and 1896. It was initially subdivided into 8 reales and circulated alongside the earlier currency, the real, until 1864, when Costa Rica decimalized and the peso was subdivided into 100 centavos. The peso was replaced by the colón at par in 1896

== Coins ==
In 1850, silver coins were issued in denominations of 1/16, 1/8 and 1/4 peso. In 1864, silver coins were introduced in denominations of 25 centavos and 1 peso. These were followed the next year by cupro-nickel 1/2 and 1 centavos and silver 5, 10 and 50 centavos, with gold 2, 5 and 10 pesos introduced by 1870. In 1889, Colombian 50 centavo coins were counterstamped and issued as 50 centavo coins in Costa Rica.

== Banknotes ==
Private banks issued notes between 1858 and 1896. The first to issue notes was the Banco Nacional de Costa Rica. The first notes were 2 pesos, followed by 10, 20, 25, 50 and 100 pesos. The Banco de Costa Rica issued peso notes between 1895 and 1899, in denominations of 1, 2, 5, 10, 20 and 100 pesos. The Banco de la Union issued notes between 1877 and 1889 for 1, 2, 5, 10, 25, 50 and 100 pesos. The Ferro Carril de Costa Rica (Costa Rican railways) issued notes in 1872 for 10, 25 and 50 centavos, 1, 2 and 5 pesos.

In 1865, the government introduced paper money in denominations of 1, 5, 10, 25 and 50 pesos. 2 peso notes were added in 1871.
