= Nicaraguan peso =

Former currency of Nicaragua

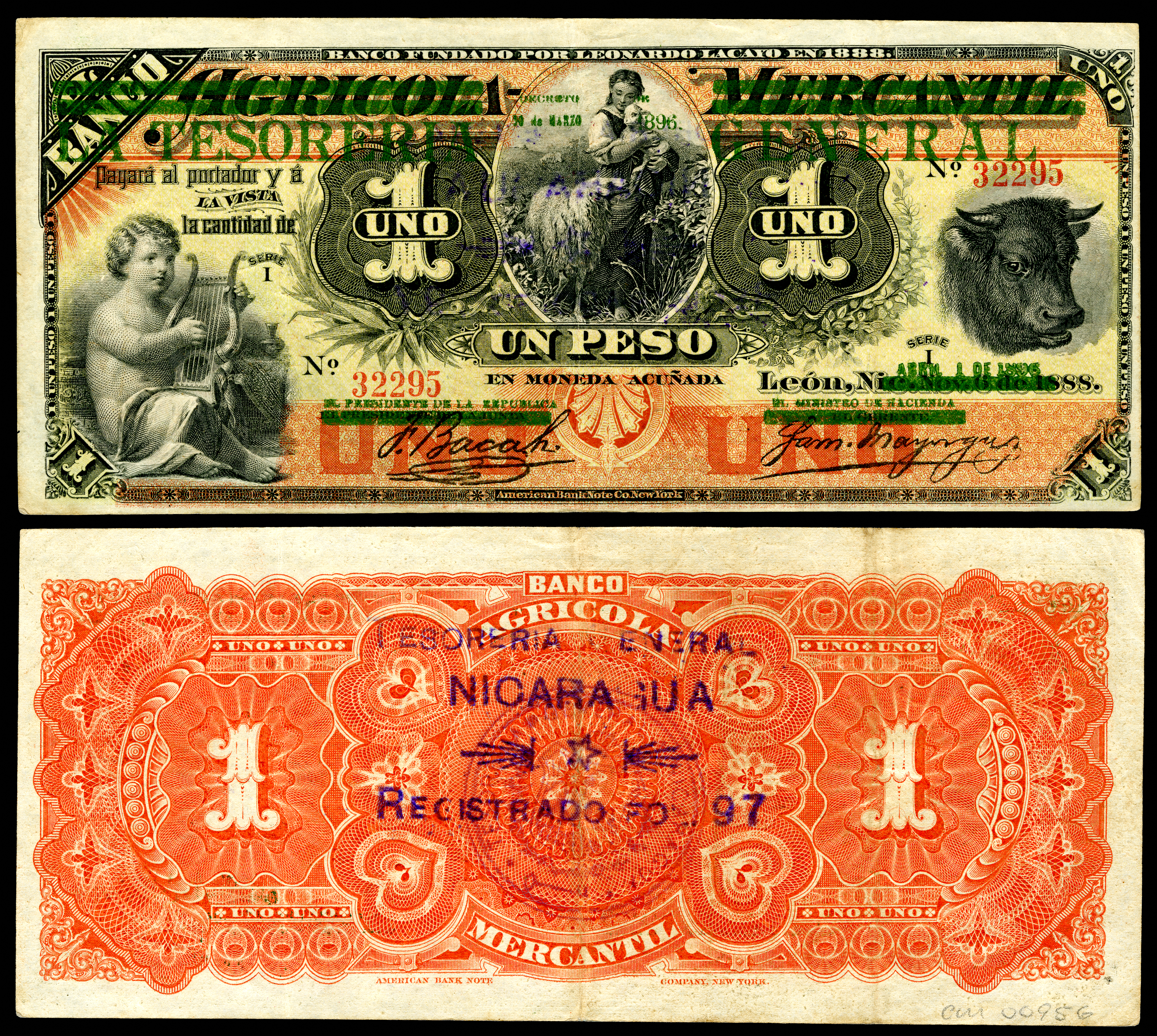
Tesoreria General overprinting of an Agricola Mercantile banknote, 1 Peso (1896).

The peso was the currency of Nicaragua between 1878 and 1912. It was Nicaragua's first national currency, replacing the Central American Republic real and that of neighbouring states. It was subdivided into 100 centavos and when it was introduced, it was worth 8 reales, and had the same weight and mass as the peso fuerte, but due to recurrent devaluations, it was replaced by the córdoba at a rate of 12 1/2 pesos = 1 peso fuerte = 1 córdoba.

== Coins ==
In 1878, cupro-nickel 1 centavo coins were introduced, followed, in 1880, by silver 5, 10 and 20 centavos. In 1898 and 1899, cupro-nickel 5 centavos coins were issued. These were the last coins of this currency to be minted.

== Banknotes ==
From 1881, the National Treasury issued notes in denominations of 1, 5, 25, 50 and 100 pesos. 10, 20 and 50 centavos notes were added in 1885, followed by 10 pesos notes in 1894.
