= Venezuelan peso =

Former currency of Venezuela

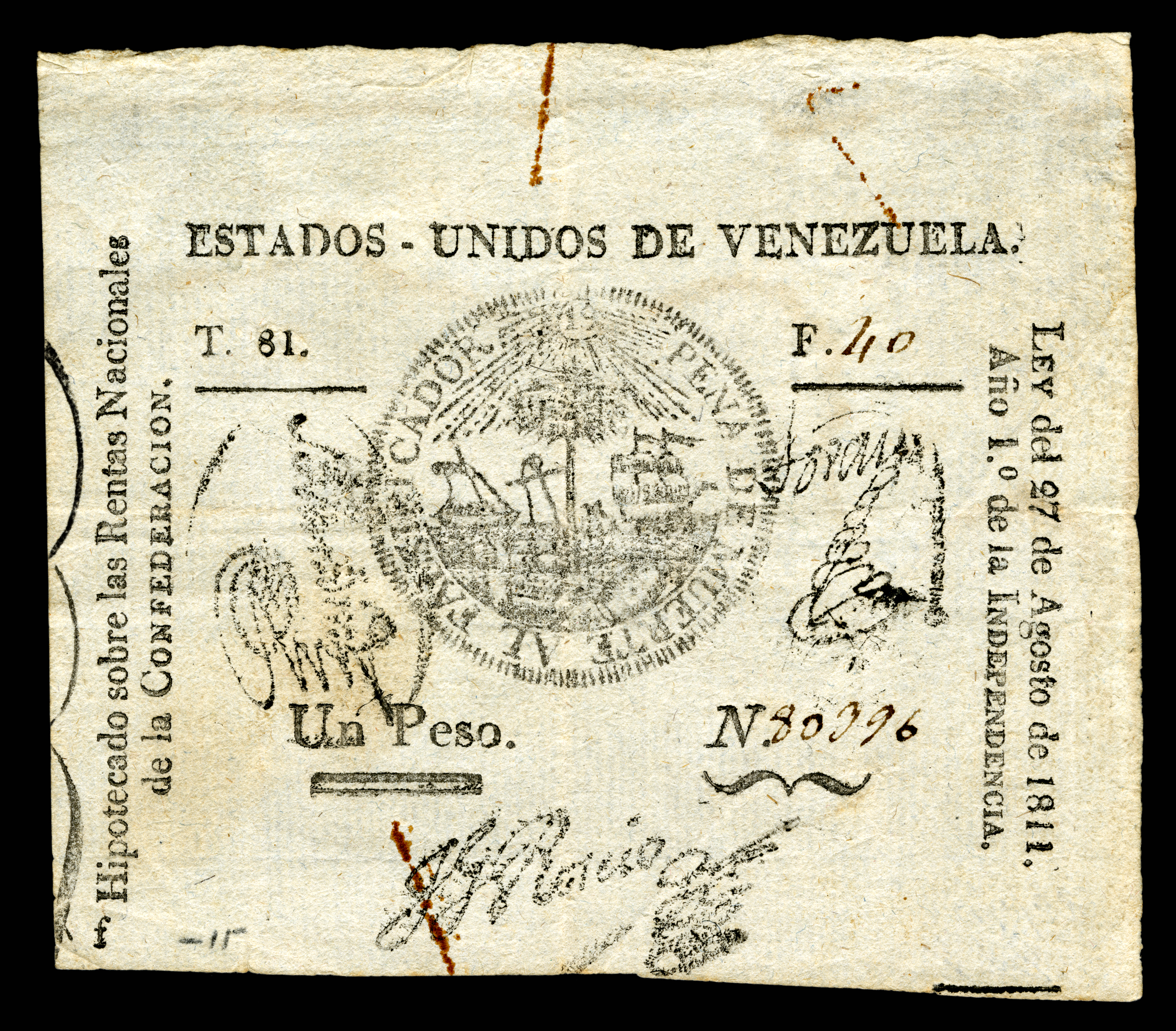
United States of Venezuela, 1 peso (1811), from the first issue of national paper currency.

The peso (local name peso fuerte) was a currency of Venezuela until 1874. It was subdivided into 10 reales, each of 10 centavos.

== History ==
Until 1821, the Spanish colonial real circulated in Venezuela. Some of these coins were minted at the Caracas Royal Mint (Spanish: Real Casa de Moneda de Caracas) established in 1802. Coins minted in Caracas were called Venezuelan reales. On 27 August 1811, with the United States of Venezuela (Estados Unidos de Venezuela) having declared their independence, the recently established Supreme Congress of Venezuela (Congreso Supremo de Venezuela) establishes the peso with an equivalence of 8 reales to 1 peso and an initial issue of one million pesos in paper money.

Since no lower denominations or metallic coins had been issued; foreign, low-value coins circulated alongside the peso in Venezuela. In particular, with the establishment of the Colombian real in 1820 came its circulation in Venezuela the following year. Indeed, as part of Gran Colombia, the Caracas mint would issue Colombian reales starting in 1821, which would continue to circulate even after Venezuela separated from Gran Colombia. On 28 March 1835, the Congress of Venezuela acknowledged these uses de jure and granted the United States Penny legal tender status within Venezuela. The Colombian real remained in use until 1837 (when it was replaced by the Colombian peso).

On 29 March 1842, the Congress of Venezuela ordered the minting of 1, ½, and ¼ centavo coins, putting an end to the use of foreign coins for this purpose. To define the value of these smaller coins, the peso was subdivided into 10 reales, each of 10 centavos, following the suit of the Colombian currency. The coins would not be seen in circulation until the following year, for which reason they are generally referred to as the "1843 coins". All other denominations would be approved by Congress on 1 April 1854.

The peso was substituted in 1871 by the venezolano, although it wouldn't enter circulation until 18 June 1874. Finally, in 1879, the bolívar was introduced.

== Coins ==
In 1843, copper coins were introduced in denominations of ¼, ½ and 1 centavo. These were followed in 1858 by silver ½, 1, 2 and 5 reales. In 1863, silver 10-real (1-peso) coins were issued, although most were later melted.

== Banknotes ==
In 1811, the Estados Unidos de Venezuela issued notes in denominations of 2 reales, 1, 2, 4, 5 and 10 pesos. In 1849, the Treasury issued notes for 5 pesos, which were followed by government issues for 5, 10, 50, 100, 500 and 1000 pesos from 1859. From 1860, notes for 8 reales and 20 pesos were issued.

Peso fuerte
Preceded by: Real; Reason: establishment of national currency Ratio: 8 reales = 1 peso fuerte	Currency of Venezuela; 27 August 1811 – 18 June 1874	Succeeded by: Venezolano; Reason: coin quality Ratio: 1 peso fuerte = 1 venezolano
