= 20,000 Colombian peso note =

Colombian currency in history

20,000 Colombian pesos
- Country: Colombia
- Value: $20,000
- Width: 143 mm
- Height: 66 mm
- Security features: Watermark; Security thread; Embossing; Transvision effect; Ultraviolet ink; Microprints; Color-shifting ink; Serial number
- Material used: 100 % cotton fiber
- Years of printing: Since 1996

Obverse
- Design: Representations of Alfonso López Michelsen and a sugar apple

Reverse
- Design: Representations of La Mojana and the sombrero vueltiao

The 20,000 Colombian peso note ($20,000) is one of the notes in circulation in Colombia. It is about 143 × 66 millimeters and the predominant color is orange. The front features former Colombian president Alfonso López Michelsen and a sugar apple, while the reverse shows a sombrero vueltiao and the canals of La Mojana. The first series of 20,000 peso notes was issued from 1996 to 2016. This version measures 140 × 70 millimeters and is blue in color. Astronomer Julio Garavito Armero and the Moon are depicted on the front, while the back shows a view of planet Earth from the lunar surface.

As of May 2016, the Bank of the Republic of Colombia estimates that 344.8 million 20,000 Colombian peso notes are in circulation in the country. First put into circulation on 2 December 1996, it has numerous security features such as a watermark, ultraviolet ink, security thread and microprinting, which certify its authenticity. Despite campaigns by the Bank of the Republic of Colombia to help citizens spot counterfeits, counterfeit notes have been seized on several occasions. Made from 100% pure cotton fiber, it has an average life of 21 months from the date of issue.

== History ==
Until 1870, there were no banks in Colombia, with the Church and major merchants dominating the credit market. Gold, silver, nickel and copper coins circulated, but no notes were yet issued by the country's still underdeveloped monetary system. The Bank of Bogotá (Banco de Bogotá) was the first private bank to be founded in Colombia in 1870. From 1871, under Law 35 of 1865, notes issued by thirty-six private banks began to coexist with metal coin until 1886, and could be redeemed by the latter. In 1886, the President of Colombia, Rafael Núñez, established a forced exchange rate for the note issued by the National Bank (Banco Nacional), founded in 1880, putting an end to the long-term issue of paper money by private banks. Decree no. 260 of 1885 suspended the convertibility of notes into metallic currency. Law no. 87 of 1886 established the National Bank note as the legal tender of the Republic, making it obligatory for the payment of public revenues and contributions, as well as for transactions between private individuals. In addition, it was henceforth forbidden to stipulate any other type of currency in contracts.

After its creation in 1923, the Bank of the Republic (Banco de la República) was established as the bank of banks and the only one authorized to issue currency. Between 1923 and 1931, denominations of 1, 2, 5, 10, 20, 50, 100 and 500 pesos entered circulation. These notes could be exchanged for gold and dollars. After the world crisis of the 1930s, they ceased to be convertible into gold and circulated as legal tender until the mid-1970s, when they were replaced by copper and nickel coins of equivalent value. Until 1991, these coins were produced by the General Treasury of the Nation, rather than by the Bank of the Republic. From 1991 onwards, the latter issued metallic coins, putting an end to the dichotomy in monetary issuance in Colombia.

== Graphic elements ==
=== First series (1996–2016) ===
The Bank of the Republic of Colombia calls on Colombian artist Juan Cárdenas for the overall design of the 20,000 Colombian peso note. Made entirely of pure cotton fiber, it is the second-highest denomination note in circulation in Colombia, measuring 140 × 70 millimeters. Like other Colombian notes in circulation, it pays tribute to a Colombian personality.

On the front side of this paper currency, whose main color is blue, the figure of scientist Julio Garavito Armero is depicted, with an image of the Moon to his left. In addition, the number "20" is written in Braille in the center of the left-hand side of the note for the blind and partially sighted. This new identification sign appears on 100 million Colombian 20,000 peso notes from 13 June 2011, and is being distributed for the first time in Bogotá. Other graphic elements include the value of the note in figures, the name of the currency (peso), that of the country (Colombia) and that of the central bank (Banco de la República). Finally, each note bears the signatures of the General Manager and the Executive Director of the Bank of the Republic of Colombia, who were in office at the time of issue.

The back of the note features an image of the Earth seen from a yellow lunar landscape, with the Garavito crater in the foreground, named after the astronomer. These illustrations are based on photographs taken in the late 1960s. In the background, whose main colors are violet, blue and magenta, appear various colored geometric shapes, taken from Euclidean geometry and used to solve astronomical and mathematical problems. At top left is the Bogotá Astronomical Observatory, of which Julio Garavito Armero was director for twenty-seven years, a position he obtained in 1892 with the government of Miguel Antonio Caro and which he began to exercise the following year. The logo of the Bank of the Republic of Colombia is also present, at the bottom left of the note.

=== Second series (since 2016) ===
The 20,000 peso note, whose predominant color is orange, measures 143 × 66 millimeters. On the front side of this paper currency, the portrait of former President of the Republic Alfonso López Michelsen is depicted on the right. There are two strips of wavy stripes on either side of the portrait. The one on the right, in orange, includes the text in capital letters "veinte mil pesos", while the one on the left, in coffee and orange tones, includes the inscription in capital letters "Alfonso López Michelsen presidente de la República de Colombia (1974-1978)". In the center of the note, López Michelsen is also shown fully upright, holding a sombrero vueltiao in his hand. To the left of López Michelsen's body is another partially printed sombrero vueltiao and a sugar apple. The denomination "20 MIL PESOS" is placed in the upper left-hand corner of the note. The serial number, consisting of two alphabetical characters and eight digits, is located in the lower right-hand corner of the noteand to the left of the President's body. The signatures of the General Manager of the Bank of the Republic of Colombia and the Executive Director, as well as the names of the central bank (Banco de la República) and the country (Colombia), are located in the lower left-hand corner.

The back of the notedepicts the canals of La Mojana, a pre-Hispanic hydraulic system built by the Zenúes. A sombrero vueltiao is featured in the lower left-hand corner of the note. Just above, a peasant can be seen carrying arrow cane, the essential raw material for the design of the sombrero vueltiao. The logo of the Bank of the Republic of Colombia is in the top right-hand corner. The value of the noteis shown in the top left-hand corner under the heading "20 MIL PESOS" and in the bottom right-hand corner under the heading "VEINTE MIL PESOS". A poem by Benjamín Puche Villadiegofeaturing the sombrero vueltiao is embossed on the right-hand side of the note.

For the visually impaired, the number 20 is written in Braille on the lower part of the notebetween the text "BANCO DE LA REPÚBLICA" and the feet of the former president. In addition, tactile markings, consisting of five diagonal lines running parallel to each other, are located on the side edges of the front of the note.

== Safety features ==
=== First series (1996–2016) ===
Colombian 20,000 peso notes are protected in several ways. For example, they have two security threads: the first has the appearance of an opaque strip, while on the second, the text "VEINTE MIL PESOS" can be read several times in succession. A transparent watermark shows Julio Garavito Armero's face, with an interlaced line to his right. There are also several embossed prints on the front and back of the note. Thanks to ultraviolet light, for example, several texts, such as the value of the notewritten in full and in figures, as well as fibrils appear in yellow. The note is also protected by a serial number, various micro-prints and a color-shifting ink used on the front for the number 20, which is gold in color and turns green when the note is tilted. Finally, on both sides of the note, there is a pattern representing a geometric shape made up of several white and colored areas. When the note is viewed through a transparency, these areas coincide perfectly with those on the other side. This technique, called "registro perfecto" in Spanish, is a transvision effect, like the one used on euro notes to show their face value.

=== Second series (since 2016) ===
The 20,000 Colombian peso notes in this second series are protected in several ways. They have a shiny, green security thread. When the note is moved, part of this security thread turns purple. The text "BRC" and the silhouette of the sombrero vueltiao are also visible through the security thread. A watermark depicts the face of Alfonso López Michelsen and the number "20". There are also several embossed impressions on the front and back of the note. Thanks to ultraviolet light, the surface of the note appears opaque except, for example, for the serial number on the front, which fluoresces yellow, micro-texts and the sombrero vueltiao, which turn green or orange, while yellow or red fibrils appear on both sides of the note. It is also protected by a serial number, by various micro-prints and by the color-shifting ink used on the front of the note for the sugar apple, which is green and turns blue when the note is tilted. Finally, it is protected by transvision effects. Thus, when the note is viewed through a transparency, a sombrero vueltiao and the text "BRC", partly on the front and partly on the back, are rendered in their entirety. Fine lines in different colors also form several combinations of motifs. On the front, to the left of the portrait of the President, a latent image representing the text "BRC" can be seen when the note is almost horizontal.

== Production and storage ==
Between 1960 and 2017, of the 26,017.95 million notes produced by the Bank of the Republic of Colombia, 2,989.30 million were 20,000 Colombian peso notes, first put into circulation on 2 December 1996, with an issue date of 23 July 1996. The English printing house Thomas De La Rue prepares the materials for the paper currency, which is then printed by the Bank of the Republic of Colombia's note printing house (Imprenta de Billetes del Banco de la República de Colombia), officially inaugurated on 23 October 1959.

In March 2010, the production cost of a 20,000 Colombian peso note was estimated at 85 pesos. By comparison, 1,000 and 50,000 Colombian peso notes cost 57 and 103 pesos respectively. This difference can be explained by the fact that the higher the value of the note, the more security features are built into it, thus generating higher costs. In 2012, more than 60% of production costs were for security features such as watermarks, security threads or fibrils, and around 20% went to special inks, which provide an additional level of security thanks to their resistance to various chemical agents, water and heat.

Annual production of 20,000 peso notes (in millions)
1996	1997	1998	1999	2000	2001	2002	2003
48	47,10	66,05	176,75	149	102,60	116	192
2004	2005	2006	2007	2008	2009	2010	2011
188,10	147,50	200,90	161,80	144,40	205,60	177,80	115,70
2012	2013	2014	2015	2016	2017	2018	2019
101,20	87,60	156,40	108,20	174,40	122,20	-	-

Notes in poor condition sent by commercial banks to the Central Treasury (Central de Efectivo) are destroyed. The notemanufacturing process lasts 28 days, from first printing to delivery to the Treasury. The average life of paper currency in Colombia from the moment it is put into circulation is one year. In 2012, the lifespan of the 20,000 peso note was higher, at 21 months, although this is still less than the 34 months for the 50,000 peso note. Unlike other countries that have adopted plastic-coated notes to guarantee a longer lifespan, the Bank of the Republic of Colombia is opposed to them. Indeed, with this technology, notes can be falsified more easily, as the manufacturing elements are easier to obtain than cotton paper, the manufacture of which is more restricted.

== Issue and circulation ==
Since 1987, the Bank of the Republic has used the decimal metric system as the issuing model for its currency. Developed by L.C. Payne and H.M. Morgan in England, it has been adapted to Colombia. Its primary objective is to anticipate the production of notes in order to maintain the stocks of money needed to meet the economy's demand, and to have safety reserves to cover any shortfalls in supply. In order to keep costs as low as possible, this banking institution must also project the dates when it will be necessary to introduce new denominations on notes or replace them with metallic currency.

The Bank of the Republic estimates that, at the end of May 2016, 344.8 million 20,000 Colombian peso notes are in circulation in Colombia, or approximately 6,896,000,000,000 Colombian pesos in denominations of 20,000.

Millions of Colombian pesos in 20,000 notes in circulation at year-end
2002	2003	2004	2005	2006	2007	2008
6 053 631,7	6 920 565,9	7 569 116,8	8 530 823	9 294 064,4	8 924 615,9	8 405 106,7
2009	2010	2011	2012	2013	2014	2015
7 634 937,8	7 796 313,4	8 065 461,6	7 653 794,1	7 518 489,6	7 764 146,24	8 462 003,22

== Counterfeiting ==
The President of the Bank of the Republic of Colombia, José Darío Uribe Escobar, launches the "Billetes y monedas: valor y arte" (Notes and coins: value and art) campaign in 2010 to help citizens spot counterfeits. Through a series of workshops, cashiers, shopkeepers, public service drivers and, in general, anyone who might be exposed to receiving counterfeit money are trained to recognize counterfeit notes. On completion of the training, they receive a decal to display in their stores and on their cash registers, to scare off potential counterfeit money traffickers. According to José Darío Uribe, "the various educational campaigns carried out by the Bank of the Republic have reduced the number of counterfeit notes in Colombia". The Bank of the Republic recommends recognizing counterfeit notes by the simple method of "touching, looking and tilting" (Tocar, mirar y girar).

In 2010, the Bank of the Republic of Colombia estimates that, for every million genuine notes in circulation, 45 are counterfeit. To combat counterfeiting, the Grupo contra la Moneda Falsa of the Cuerpo Tecnico de Investigacion, a division of the Fiscalía General de la Nación, carries out operations to dismantle counterfeiting networks. For example, in a raid in 2011, CTI agents seized 225 million counterfeit pesos from a house used as a clandestine printing works in Bello, Antioquia. A lithographic press used to print paper money and plates for the production of 5,000, 20,000 and 50,000 peso notes were also recovered. In June 2016, in Medellín, Colombian police dismantled two clandestine workshops producing counterfeit 5,000, 10,000, 20,000 and 50,000 peso notes. This led to the biggest seizure of counterfeit currency in the country's history, totalling 35,000 million pesos.

In October 2016, less than four months after the new note was put into circulation, Directorate of Criminal Investigation and Interpol (DIJIN by its acronym in Spanish) discovered counterfeit 20,000 peso notes depicting former president Alfonso López Michelsen during an operation against a criminal organization whose leader, Cucho, was captured.

== Editions ==
The first series of Colombian 20,000 peso notes was issued thirty times. The initial issue bore the signatures of the gerente general (president) and gerente ejecutivo (executive director) of the Bank of the Republic of Colombia, who at the time were Miguel Urrutia Montoya and Fernando Copete Saldarriaga respectively.

The portrait of Alfonso López Michelsen and the sombrero vueltiao have been incorporated into the new 20,000 peso note since 2016, under Laws no. 1599 of 2012 and no. 908 of 2004 respectively.

20,000 Colombian peso notes issued and put into circulation
Series	n.°	Editions	Circulation releases	Changes from previous edition (other than date of edition)	Reference
1st	1	23 July 1996	2 December 1996		
1st	2	6 January 1998	22 May 1998		
1st	3	7 August 1998	7 December 1998		
1st	4	6 May 1999	19 October 1999	The Bank's emblem is now located in the lower left-hand corner of the reverse.	
1st	5	1 May 2000	7 July 2000	From now on, the note will bear the signature of the President of the Bank of the Republic of Colombia, Miguel Urrutia Montoya, and the Executive Director, Gerardo Hernández Correa.	
1st	6	12 October 2000	26 January 2001		
1st	7	1 June 2001	10 September 2001	The place of publication Santa Fe de Bogotá no longer appears in the previous version.	
1st	8	23 July 2001	21 May 2002		
1st	9	7 August 2001	9 December 2002		
1st	10	14 May 2002	6 June 2003		
1st	11	20 November 2002	12 December 2003		
1st	12	13 June 2003	3 September 2004		
1st	13	16 June 2003	21 December 2004		
1st	14	21 September 2004	31 October 2005		
1st	15	22 September 2004	7 December 2005		
1st	16	8 March 2005	7 July 2006	Miguel Urrutia Montoya's signature is replaced by that of the new President of the Bank of the Republic of Colombia, José Darío Uribe Escobar. Executive Director Gerardo Hernández Correa's signature remains.	
1st	17	3 November 2005	11 September 2006		
1st	18	5 February 2006	29 October 2007		
1st	19	20 November 2006	28 January 2008		
1st	20	21 November 2006	4 November 2008		
1st	21	22 November 2006	13 July 2009		
1st	22	21 August 2007	9 December 2009		
1st	23	2 September 2008	15 June 2010		
1st	24	3 September 2008	20 May 2011		
1st	25	23 August 2009	13 June 2011	The number 20 is added in Braille for blind people in the center of the left-hand side of the front panel.	
1st	26	24 August 2009	7 December 2012		
1st	27	5 August 2010	31 October 2013		
1st	28	6 August 2010	18 July 2014		
1st	29	23 August 2012	14 November 2014	The signature of the President of the Bank of the Republic of Colombia, José Darío Uribe Escobar, is still present. Gerardo Hernández Correa's signature has been replaced by that of the new Executive Director, José Tolosa Buitrago.	
1st	30	6 September 2013	16 October 2015		
2nd	31	19 August 2015	30 June 2016	This is the first edition of the second series of 20,000 peso notes.	
2nd	32	19 August 2015	7 December 2016		
2nd	33	2 August 2016	24 July 2017		
2nd	34	2 August 2016	13 March 2018		

== See also ==
- 50,000 Colombian peso note
- Colombian peso
- Economy of Colombia

== Bibliography ==
- Chacón, Nestor Ricardo (2005). Derecho Monetario (in Spanish). Universidad del Rosario. ISBN 9-58707058-5.
