= Armero (surname) =

Armero is a surname. Notable people with the surname include:

- Álvaro Fernández Armero (born 1969), Spanish filmmaker
- Francisco Armero, 1st Marquess of Nervión (1804–1866), Spanish military officer and politician
- Julio Garavito Armero (1865–1920), Colombian astronomer
- Pablo Armero (born 1986), Colombian football player
