= Garavito =

Garavito is a surname. Notable people with the surname include:

- Luis Garavito (1957–2023), prolific Colombian serial killer and rapist
- Julio Garavito Armero (1865–1920), Colombian astronomer

== See also ==
- Garavito (crater), a lunar impact crater on the Moon
