= Coins of the Venezuelan venezolano =

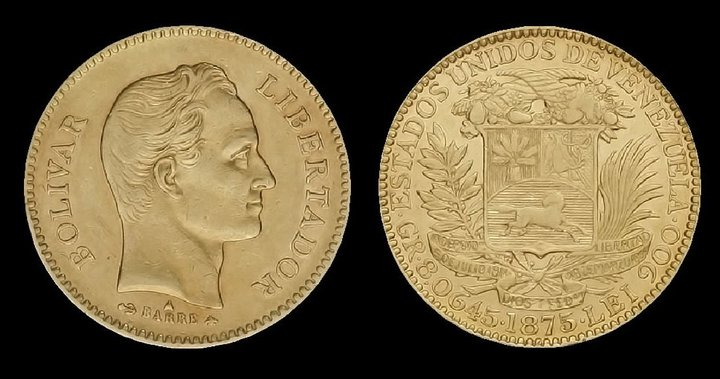
5 Venezolanos coin

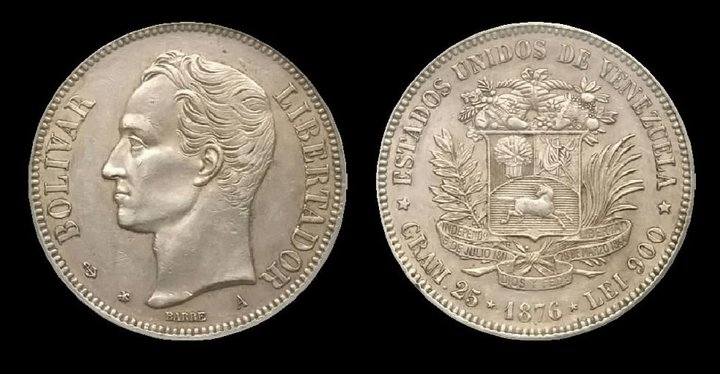
1 Venezolano coin

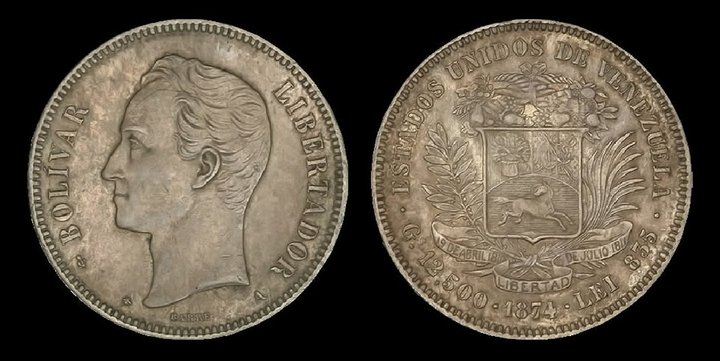
50 centaves of Venezolano coin

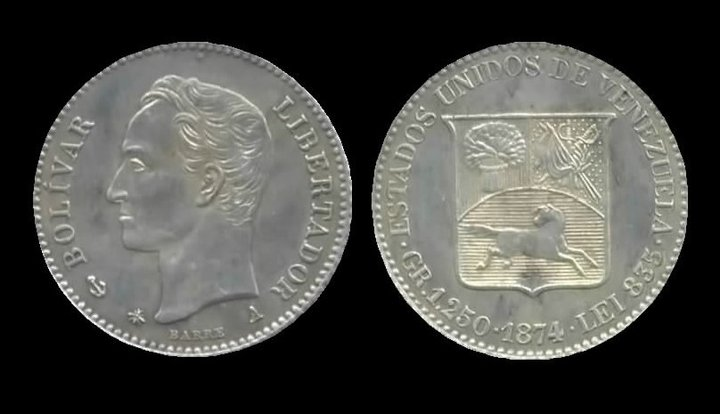
5 centaves of Venezolano coin

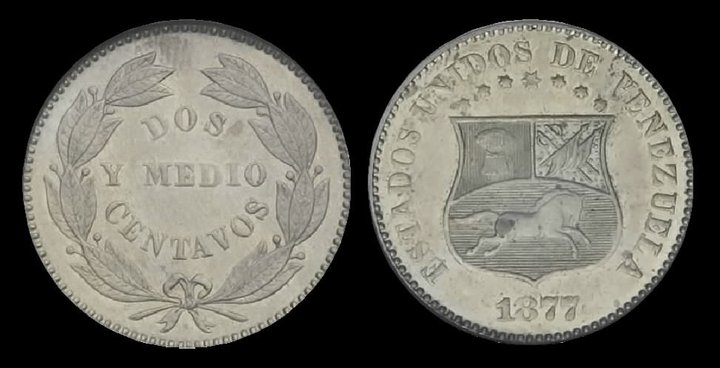
2,5 centaves of Venezolano coin

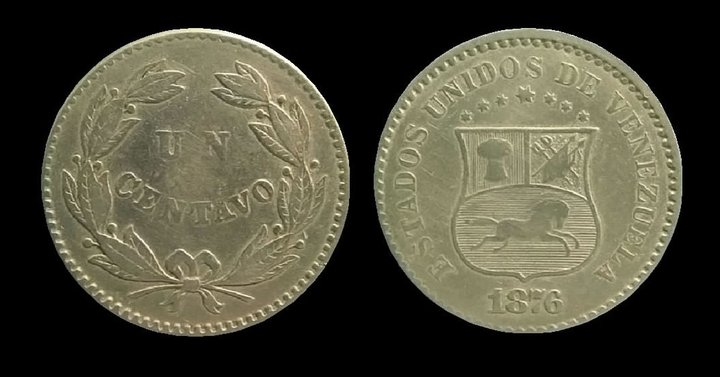
1 centaves of Venezolano coin

The Coins of the Venezuelan venezolano circulated between 1874 and 1897. On June 11, 1873, the government ordered subsidiary silver coins of 5, 10, 20, and 50 centésimos de venezolano from Paris. An order for gold coins was placed on September 16, 1874, originally for pieces of 1, 5, 10, and 20 venezolanos, the 20-venezolano gold piece to be called the Bolívar. This order was subsequently altered to a silver 1 venezolano and a gold 5 venezolanos. The dies for the coins produced in Paris were engraved by Albert Désiré Barre, chief engraver of the Paris Mint (1855–1878).

On June 14, 1876, the Minister of Finance ordered coins of 75% copper and 25% nickel for 1 and 2½ centésimos de venezolano from the United States to replace copper centavos. They were minted at Philadelphia.

Gold 900 fine

- 5 venezolanos

Obv. beaded border; in the field the bust of Bolívar facing right; "BOLÍVAR" left + "LIBERTADOR" right + anchor, bee, "BARRE", "A" [marks of the manager, chief engraver, and Paris Mint, respectively]. Rev. in the field the large national arms; "ESTADOS UNIDOS DE VENEZUELA" above; "GR*8,0645" *1875* LEI 900" below.

Silver 900 fine

- venezolano

Obv. beaded border; in the field the bust of Bolívar facing left; "BOLÍVAR" left + "LIBERTADOR" right + anchor, bee, "BARRE", "A" [marks of the manager, chief engraver, and Paris Mint, respectively]. Rev. in the field the large national arms; "ESTADOS UNIDOS DE VENEZUELA" above, "GRAM.25 *1876* LEI 900" below.

Silver 835 fine

- 50 centavos
- 20 centavos
- 10 centavos
- 5 centavos

Common obv. beaded border; in the field the bust of Bolívar facing left; "BOLÍVAR" left + "LIBERTADOR" right + anchor, bee, "BARRE", "A" [marks of the manager, chief engraver, and Paris Mint, respectively]. Common rev. in the field the national arms (5c with small, others with large arms); "ESTADOS UNIDOS DE VENEZUELA" above, "[weight] *[year]* LEI 835" below.
[weight]: 5c, "GR.1,250"; 10c, "GR.2,500"; 20c, "GRAM,5"; 50c, "Gs.12,500".

Copper-nickel

- 2½ centavos
- 1 centavo

Obv. beaded border; in the field the small national arms; "ESTADOS UNIDOS DE VENEZUELA" above, [year] below. Rev. "[value]" inside laurel wreath.
[value]: 1c, "UN | CENTAVO"; 2½c, "DOS | Y MEDIO | CENTAVOS".

Venezolano Gold, silver, and cupronickel coins dated 1873–1877 (by year in millions of pieces, approximate)
Coin:	0·01	0·025	0·05	0·10	0·20	0·50	1	5
name:	puya	locha	medio	real	peseta	bamba	fuerte	-----
	CuNi	CuNi	AR 835	AR 835	AR 835	AR 835	AR 900	AV 900
grams	2·500	4·000	1·250	2·500	5·000	12·500	25·000	8·0645
mm:	19	23	15	18	23	30	37	22
1873						0·200		
1874			0·800	0·800	0·400	0·200		
1875								0·0692
1876	8·000	1·500	0·520	0·280	0·136	0·158	0·035	
1877	2·000	0·500						
