= Venezuelan real =

Currency

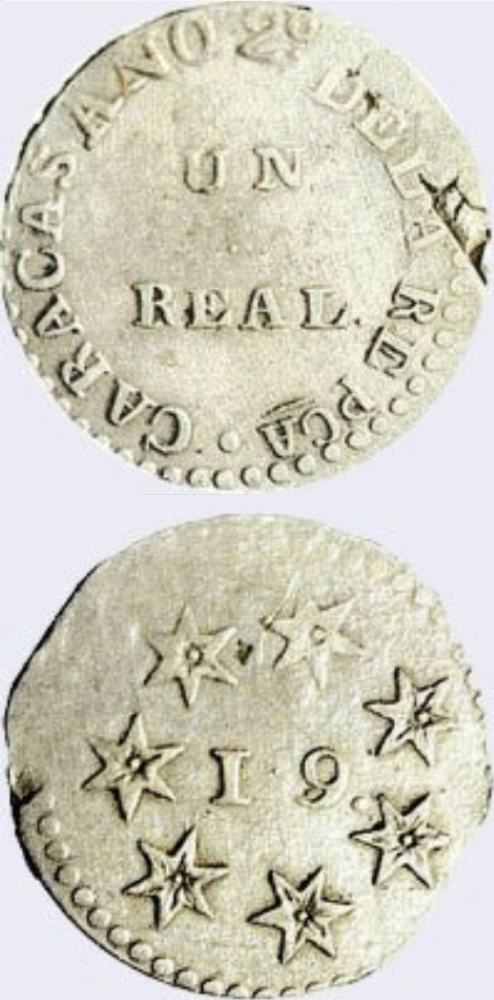
Coin of one Real in silver, minted in Caracas.

The real (plural: reales) was the currency of Venezuela until 1843.

== History ==
Until 1821, the Spanish colonial real circulated in Venezuela. On 12 June 1802, a mint was opened in Caracas and issued coins denominated in reales until 1821. Paper money was introduced in 1811 denominated in pesos. The Colombian real circulated in Venezuela from 1821, with some coins struck in Caracas. In 1837, the Colombian real was replaced by the Colombian peso (subdivided into 8 reales), which was itself replaced by the Venezuelan peso (subdivided into 10 reales) in 1842 (though it would take a year for the new coins to enter circulation, replacing the 1820s reales). The "real" moniker would continue to be used as a subdivision of the peso until 1863 when the last coin bearing "real" was struck.

== Coins ==
From 1802, copper 1/8 and 1/4 real coins were issued. Silver 1 and 2 reales followed in 1810. In 1812, the Republican government issued copper 1/8 and 1/4 real and silver 1/2 and 1 real. From 1813, the provinces of Guayana and Maracaibo issued copper 1/8 and 1/4 real coins. The Royalists issued silver 1, 2 and 4 reales between 1817 and 1821. During the period Venezuela was part of Gran Colombia, silver 1/4 real coins were struck at Caracas.

Real
| Preceded by: Silver Real; Reason: Establishment of local mint Ratio: 1 silver real = 1 real | Currency of Venezuela; 12 June 1802 – 29 March 1842 (start of phaseout) | Succeeded by: Peso fuerte Reason: Establishment of national currency Ratio: 8 reales = 1 peso fuerte |
