= Garabito =

Garabito may refer to:

- Garabito (canton), canton in Puntarenas, Costa Rica
- King Garabito, Huetar king, ruled c. 1561–1574
- Garabito Empire, state ruled by King Garabito
- Jaime Garabito, the real name of the character known as Jaimito the Mailman in the Mexican television sitcom El Chavo del Ocho.

== See also ==
- Garavito
