= 50,000 Colombian peso note =

50,000 pesos
(Colombia)
- Value: 50,000 pesos
- Width: 148 mm
- Height: 66 mm
- Security features: hologram stripe, watermarks, security thread, embossing, microprinting, ultra-violet ink, colour-shifting ink, serial number
- Material used: cotton fibre
- Years of printing: 2000 - 2016; 2016 – present (new version)

Obverse
- Design: Gabriel García Márquez
- Designer: Bank of the Republic

Reverse
- Designer: Bank of the Republic

The 50,000 Colombian peso note is the second highest denomination of Colombian currency. Designed by Óscar Muñoz, the front of the notes feature Jorge Isaacs and the heroine of his novel María, and the back of the notes feature an Albizia saman tree, two palm trees, an image of Isaacs' house El Paraiso, and an excerpt from María. In June 2013, the Bank of the Republic of Colombia estimated that 602,500,000 notes of the 50,000 denomination were in circulation.

It was first printed on 1 December 2000, and contains many safety features such as a watermark, ultra-violet ink, a holographic strip, and microprinting. Measuring 140 by 70 millimetres (5.5 by 2.8 in), each note is made of cotton fibre.

== History ==
Until 1870, there were no banks in Colombia; credit was only available through the Church and major traders. Coins made of gold, silver, nickel and copper were in circulation but no notes were issued, given the underdeveloped monetary system of Colombia. The Banco de Bogotá was the first private bank to be established in Colombia, in 1870. From 1871 to 1886, thirty-six private banks issued notes under Act 35. However, in 1886, President Rafael Núñez declared notes produced by Banco Nacional as Colombia's legal tender.

After its creation in 1923, the Bank of the Republic (Spanish: Banco de la República) was established as Colombia's main bank, and the only one permitted to issue currency. Between 1923 and 1931, denominations of 1, 2, 5, 10, 20, 50, 100 and 500 peso notes were put into circulation, which were able to be exchanged for gold or United States dollars. After the 1930s, these notes ceased to be convertible into gold but remained in circulation until the mid 1970s, when they were replaced by copper and nickel coins. These coins were manufactured until 1991 by the General Treasury of the Nation.

== Graphics ==
The printing of the notes of the Bank of the Republic of Colombia (Spanish: Imprenta de Billetes del Banco de la República de Colombia) was officially inaugurated on 23 October 1959, and the 50,000 peso note was first printed in 2000. The 50,000 peso note is the highest denomination of currency in Colombia, and measures 140mm by 70mm. The illustrations are presented vertically, and the note was designed by Óscar Muñoz.

On the front side of the note, the main colours are purple, green and yellow, and it features an image of writer and poet Jorge Isaacs, with a background of the Cauca River in Valle del Cauca. The heroine of his novel María is also shown, an image which was inspired a monument by Luis A. Parera. "50" is written in Braille. Also on the front of the note is the name of the currency (peso), the country (Colombia), and the name of the Bank of the Republic.

The reverse of the note features an Albizia saman tree, which is characteristic to the region of Valle del Cauca, and also an image of Isaacs' house El Paraiso, which he purchased in 1854 and resided in during his adolescence. This side is predominantly purple and yellow, and also contains the logo of the Bank of the Republic. Two palm trees are also printed on the reverse, and behind them is a paragraph from María about the evening atmosphere in Valle del Cauca:

Una tarde, tarde como las de mi país, engalanada con nubes de color violeta y lampos de oro pálido, bella como María, bella y transitoria como fue ésta para mí, ella, mi hermana y yo, sentados sobre la ancha piedra de la pendiente, desde donde veíamos a la derecha en la honda vega rodar las corrientes bulliciosas del río, y teniendo a nuestros pies el valle majestuoso y callado, leía yo el episodio de Atala, y las dos, admirables en su inmovilidad y abandono.

== Editions ==
Since the initial printing of the 50,000 peso note, there have been nineteen editions of it:

Editions of the 50,000 peso note
Issue number	Date of issue	Date of release	Changes from the previous issue
1	7 August 2000	1 December 2000	
2	1 May 2001	1 March 2002	The place of printing (Bogotá) no longer appears on the note.
3	23 July 2001	11 August 2003	
4	15 May 2002	11 October 2004	
5	20 June 2003	23 September 2005	
6	9 March 2005	1 December 2006	The signature of Miguel Urrutia Montoya is replaced with the new director of the Bank of the Republic's signature, José Darío Uribe Escobar. The signature of executive director Gerardo Hernandez Correa remains on the note.
7	6 February 2006	10 April 2007	
8	23 November 2006	14 December 2007	
9	24 November 2006	10 November 2008	
10	22 August 2007	5 June 2009	
11	4 September 2008	12 January 2010	
12	5 September 2008	2 November 2010	
13	25 August 2009	8 April 2011	
14	26 August 2009	21 October 2011	
15	27 August 2009	19 December 2011	
16	7 August 2010	2 November 2012	
17	8 August 2010	5 April 2013	
18	26 August 2011	4 October 2013	
19	27 August 2011	12 December 2013	

== Safety features ==
The notes have two security threads, the first being an opaque band, and the second being the text "50 MIL PESOS COLOMBIA" which can be seen under direct light. There is a watermark of Jorge Isaacs' face, along with many examples of relief printing. Under ultraviolet light, the note appears to be orange with yellow fibrils. It is also protected by a serial number, and various microprinting and colour-shifting ink is used on the front for the number 50 (which the colour-shifting ink causes to change from a golden to green colour when tilted). On both sides of the note, there are books shown on the notes with blank areas of colour. When the note is viewed by transparency, these areas coincide with the ones on the other side of the note.

== Production ==
As of March 2010, the production cost of each 50,000 peso note is 103 pesos. In comparison, a 1,000 peso note costs 57 pesos to produce, given that it does not have as many safety devices. Notes in poor condition are sent to the Central Treasury (Spanish: Central de Efectivo), where they are destroyed. The manufacturing process of each note takes 28 days, and each note will stay in circulation for 34 months. Despite other countries adopting laminated notes for greater durability, Colombia has decided not to in order to attempt to prevent counterfeit notes.

== See also ==
- 20,000 Colombian peso note
- Colombian peso
