= Venezuelan venezolano =

Former currency of Venezuela

Venezolano
Preceded by: Peso; Reason: coin quality Ratio: at parity	Currency of Venezuela; 11 May 1871 – 31 March 1879	Succeeded by: Bolívar; Reason: unification of circulating currencies Ratio: 1/5 venezolano = 1 bolívar

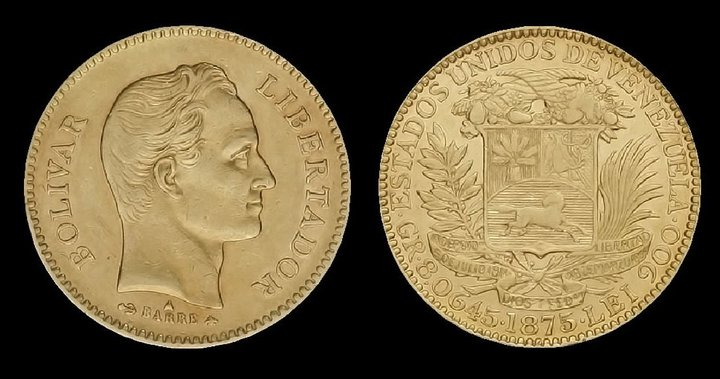
5 Venezolanos coin

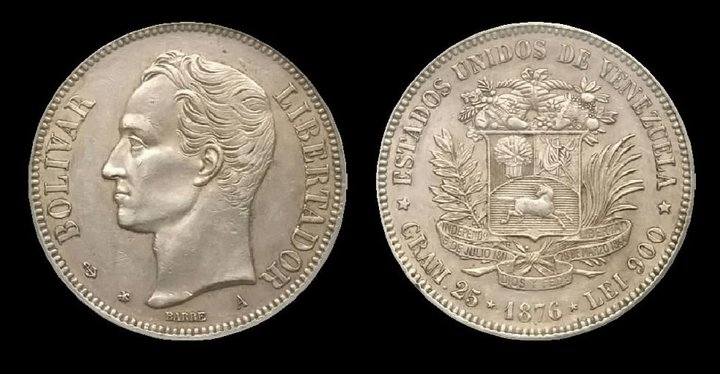
1 Venezolano coin

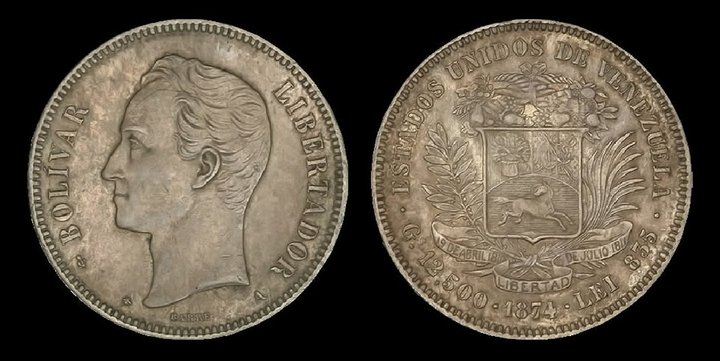
50 centavos of Venezolano coin

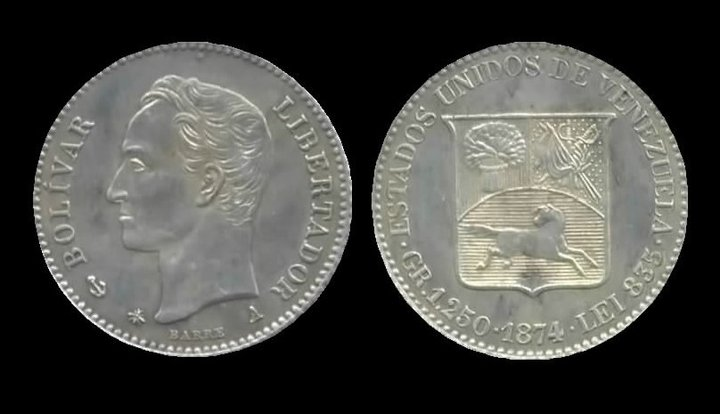
5 centavos of Venezolano coin

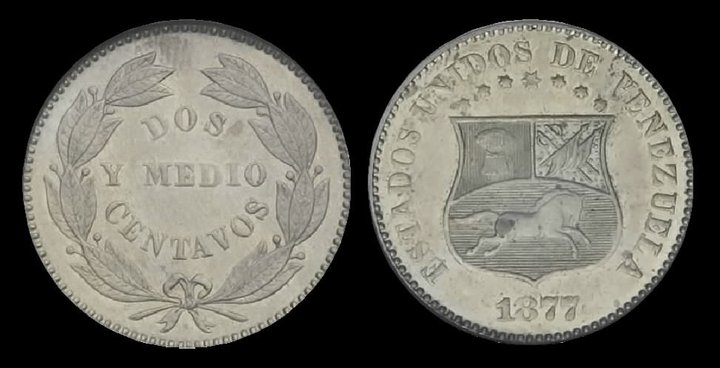
2,5 centavos of Venezolano coin

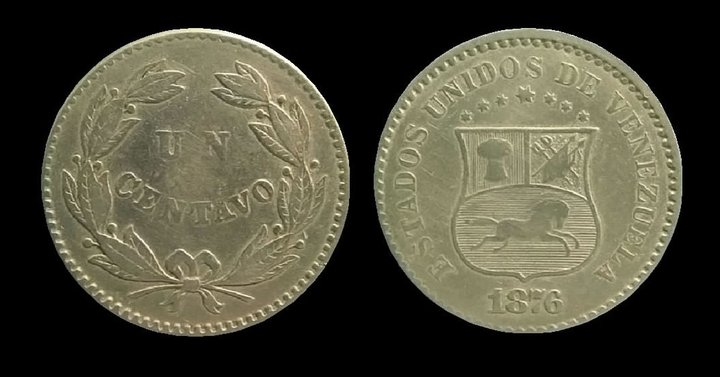
1 centavo of Venezolano coin

The venezolano was the currency of Venezuela between 1872 and 1879. It was divided into 100 centavos, although the names céntimo and centésimo were also used. Venezolano was also the name of two currencies planned in 1854 and 1865 (see Currency of Venezuela).

== History ==
Given the inability of previous governments to order enough coins from the mints in Paris, London, and United States to meet demand, many foreign and demonetised coins circulated that were prone to perforations, scratches, chipping, or smoothing beyond recognition. The monetary law of 11 May 1871 replaced the peso (the only one of the coins in circulation that was legal tender) with the venezolano at par. Coins were minted by several banks including la Compañía de Crédito (lit. The Credit Company) and Estado de Guayana (lit. State of Guiana) following a pattern of copper, nickel, silver and gold.

From 1 January 1872 all accounts had to be converted and expressed in venezolanos and centavos. Coins minted in conformity with the 1857 monetary law (centavos of pesos) were to continue in circulation, however, it would cease to be legal to accept payment in foreign currency. The new venezolano coins were introduced into circulation in June 1874. The Venezuelan coinage of 1858 had been very limited; the coinage of 1873-1877 marked the establishment of a true, modern national coinage.

These coins are the first to use the effigy of Bolívar, the same one still in use in current coins. This design had already been contemplated as part of the monetary law of 12 June 1865 for coins that would be minted in gold and silver, but this was never carried out. Another innovation was in the 5 Venezolanos coin, which depicted Bolívar facing to the right.

In 1879, the Latin Monetary Union bimetallic standard was adopted, with the silver venezolano (venezolano de plata or fuerte) of 25g .900 fine and a gold venezolano of 1.612 g .900 fine. The subsidiary silver coinage was only .835 fine, legal tender to a maximum of 40 venezolanos per transaction.

However, the peso and the real continued to circulate illegally. The monetary law of 31 March 1879 replaced the venezolano and the outdated currencies as the single monetary unit with the bolívar at 5 bolívares = 1 venezolano or 1 bolívar = 20 centavos de venezolano.

== Coins ==
In 1874, silver 5, 10, 20 and 50 centavos and 1 venezolano coins were introduced. These were followed in 1875 by gold 5 venezolanos and in 1876 by cupro-nickel 1 and 2½ centavos.

== Banknotes ==
Banknotes were produced by the Compañia de Crédito (Company of Credit), the Banco de Caracas (Bank of Caracas) and the State of Guayana. Denominations included 50 centésimos and 1, 2, 4, 5, 8, 10, 20, 50 and 100 venezolanos

The State of Guayana (Estado de Guayana) issued state notes of limited local significance in 1878-1880 for 50 centésimos and 1, 2, 4, and 8 venezolanos between 1878 and 1879, printed in Ciudad Bolívar.
