= Henri Chrétien =

French astronomer (1879–1956)

Henri Jacques Chrétien
- Chrétien at the Fourth Conference International Union for Cooperation in Solar Research at Mount Wilson Observatory, 1910
- Born: 1 February 1879; Paris, France
- Died: 6 February 1956 (aged 77); Washington, D.C.
- Known for: Ritchey–Chrétien telescope
- Scientific career
- Fields: Astronomy
- Institutions: Nice Observatory; École supérieure d'optique

Henri Jacques Chrétien (French pronunciation: [ɑ̃ʁi ʒak kʁetjɛ̃]; 1 February 1879, Paris – 6 February 1956, Washington, D.C.) was a French astronomer and an inventor.

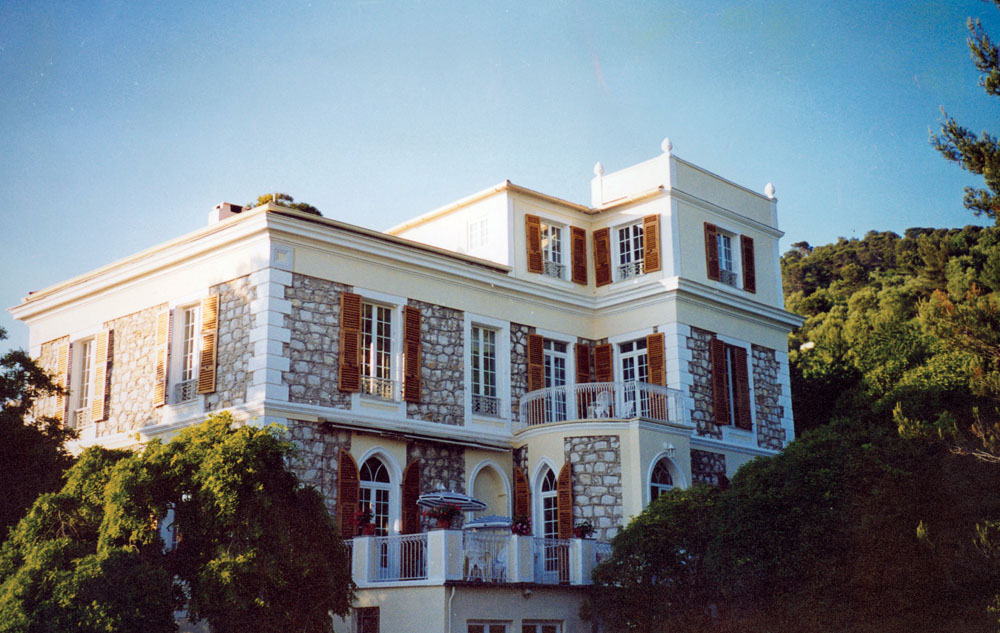
Villa Paradou, Cap Ferrat, France

Trompe-l'œil mosaic floor in the Villa Paradou by Rainer Maria Latzke honoring Henri Chrétien,

Born in Paris, France, his most famous inventions are:

- the anamorphic widescreen process, using an anamorphic lens system called Hypergonar, that resulted in the CinemaScope widescreen technique, and
- the co-invention, with George Willis Ritchey, of the Ritchey–Chrétien telescope, an improved type of astronomical telescope, employing a system now used in virtually all large research telescopes.

He spent part of his early astronomical career at the Nice Observatory, which was close to his house, the Villa Paradou. The Villa was built by famous French architect Charles Garnier who also built the Nice Observatory and both the operas of Paris and Monaco. In 1995, the abandoned villa was acquired by the artist Rainer Maria Latzke, who restored it and added new murals to the existing frescoes.

Chrétien was one of the founders of the Institut d'optique théorique et appliquée and professor at the French "grande école" SupOptique (École supérieure d'optique).

== Awards and honours ==
- The astronomical Chrétien International Research Grants awards are in honour of him
- In 1901, Chrétien, Joseph Joachim Landerer and Thomas David Anderson jointly received the Prix Jules Janssen, the highest award of the Société astronomique de France (French Astronomical Society).
- Valz Prize from the French Academy of Sciences (1931)
- The crater Chrétien on the Moon is named in his honour.
- In 1955, he received an Academy Award for his work on the CinemaScope process
- The Pavillon Henri Chrétien, an historical building on the Nice Observatory site which is visible from the city of Nice, also bears his name.

== Publications ==
- ADS NASA
- Library of Congress
- Library of Congress
