= Santo Domingo real =

Currency of the Spanish colony of Santo Domingo

The real was the currency of Santo Domingo (now the Dominican Republic) until 1822. Some coins were struck locally which circulated alongside other Spanish colonial coins. The real was replaced by the Haitian gourde when Santo Domingo was taken over by Haïti.

For later currencies of the Dominican Republic, see Dominican peso

== Coins ==
Coins were minted in denominations of 1/4, 1 and 2 reales, with the 1/4 real in copper and the 1 and 2 reales in silver. Mexican 1 and 8 real coins were countermarked with the crowned monogram F7^{o} for circulation in Santo Domingo.
