= Colombian peso =

Currency of Colombia

Peso colombiano (Spanish)
- Series 2015

ISO 4217
- Code: COP (numeric: 170)
- Subunit: 0.01

Units of account
- Symbol: $
- Subunit
- 1/100: Centavo (Note: Regular issue of centavo coins ended in 1984. The centavo is no longer in practical use, although financial statements do still record amounts to the centavo (e.g., "$123.456,78"; Colombia uses the comma as the decimal separator))

Denominations
- Banknotes
- Freq. used: $2,000, $5,000, $10,000, $20,000, $50,000, $100,000
- Rarely used: $1,000 (discontinued)
- Coins
- Freq. used: $100, $200, $500, $1,000
- Rarely used: $50

Demographics
- Date of introduction: 1837
- Replaced: Colombian real
- Official user(s): Colombia
- Unofficial users: Venezuela: Apure; Barinas; Mérida; Táchira

Issuance
- Central bank: Banco de la República
- Website: www.banrep.gov.co

Valuation
- Inflation: 4,82% (June 2025)

The Colombian peso (sign: $; code: COP) is the currency of Colombia. Its ISO 4217 code is COP. The official sign is $, with Col$. also being used to distinguish it from other peso- and dollar-denominated currencies.

One peso is divided into one hundred centavos; however, because of high inflation in the 1970s and 1980s, Colombia ceased issuing centavo coins for circulation in 1984. It remains customary to write monetary amounts with centavos, although it is rare in daily lives and general contexts. The 50 peso coins are still legal tender, but due to its low value and circulation, most cash transactions are rounded to the nearest 100 pesos; while electronic transactions and banking statements are still processed to the centavo, centavos have practically no purchasing power.

== History ==
US dollar exchange rate against Colombian peso, starting from 1991.

Colombia used Spanish colonial real until 1820 after independence from Spain was achieved. It was replaced by the Colombian real. In 1837, the Colombian real was replaced by the current peso at a rate of 1 peso = 8 reales and was initially subdivided into 8 reales. In 1847, Colombia decimalized the currency and the peso was subdivided into ten reales, each of 10 décimos de reales, later centavos. The real was renamed the décimo in 1853, although the last reales were struck in 1880. The current system of 100 centavos to the peso was first used in 1819 on early banknotes but did not reappear until the early 1860s on banknotes and was not used on the coinage until 1872.

In 1871, Colombia adopted the gold standard, pegging the peso to the French franc at a rate of 1 peso = 5 francs. This peg only lasted until 1886, when convertibility was suspended. From 1888, printing press inflation caused Colombia's paper money (pegged to sterling at a rate of four shillings to one peso, or 5 pesos = 1 pound) to depreciate and the exchange rate between specie and paper money was fixed at 100 peso moneda corriente = 1 coinage peso. Between 1907 and 1914, coins were issued denominated in "peso p/m", equal to paper pesos. In 1910, the Conversion Board began issuing banknotes in the form of peso oro. In 1931, the United Kingdom left the gold standard and the peso shifted its peg to the United States dollar, at a rate of 1.05 pesos = 1 dollar, a slight devaluation from its previous peg, this until 1949. Nevertheless, Peso banknotes continued to be issued expressed as peso oro until 1993.

In 2018, the Congress of Colombia debated whether to redenominate the peso at a rate of 1,000 pesos = 1 new peso, removing three zeroes from its face value, in order to make accounting and banking operations easier. A new series of banknotes was introduced in 2016 with the last three zeroes of the denomination replaced by the word "mil" (thousand), this would enable the printing of the same banknotes with the word "mil" replaced by the word "nuevos" (new). The proposal was supported by then President Juan Manuel Santos, but faced opposition due to the high cost it would have and the minimal benefits it would bring, also confusion in a mostly cash-based economy, contracts made, and the possibility of future inflation rending the changes meaningless, though reduction of inflation was not one of the expected outcomes of the redenomination. President Iván Duque did not support the change, and the proposal is currently not considered by the Government.

== Coins ==
Between 1837 and 1839, silver 1/4, 1/2, 1, 2, and 8 real coins were introduced, along with gold 1, 2, and 16 pesos. These were mostly continuations of coins issued before 1837 in the name of the Republic of Colombia but with the escudo denominations replaced by pesos. In 1847, the currency was decimalized and coins were introduced in denominations of 1/2 and 1 décimo de real in copper and 1, 2, 8, and 10 reales in silver. 1/4 and 1/2 real coins followed in 1849 and 1850. In 1853, silver 1/2 and 1 décimo, and gold 10 peso coins were introduced, followed by 2 décimos in 1854 and 1 peso in 1855, both in silver. In 1856, gold 5 peso coins were added.

Between 1859 and 1862, coins were issued by the Grenadine Confederation in silver for 1/4, 1/2 and 2 reales, 1/4, 1/2 and 1 décimo, and 1 peso, and in gold for 1, 2, 5, 10 and 20 pesos. The United States of New Grenada issued silver 1 décimo and 1 peso in 1861.

Beginning in 1862, coins were issued by the United States of Colombia. Silver coins were struck in denominations of 1/4, 1/2, 1, 2, and 5 décimos, and 1 peso, together with gold 1, 2, 5, 10, and 20 pesos. With the introduction of the centavo in 1872, silver 2 1/2, 5, 10, 20, and 50 centavos were issued, followed by cupro-nickel 1 1/4 centavos in 1874 and cupro-nickel 2 1/2 centavos in 1881.

In 1886, the country's name reverted to the Republic of Colombia. The first issues were cupro-nickel 5 centavos. Except for silver 50 centavos (also denominated 5 décimos) issued between 1887 and 1889, no other denominations were issued until 1897, when silver 10 and 20 centavos were introduced. Silver 5 centavos were issued in 1902

In 1907, following the stabilization of the paper money, cupro-nickel 1, 2, and 5 pesos p/m were introduced and issued until 1916. In 1913, after the pegging of the peso to sterling, gold 2 1/2 and 5 peso coins were introduced which were of the same weight and composition as the half sovereign and sovereign. Gold 10 pesos were also issued in 1919 and 1924, with the 2 1/2 and 5 pesos issued until 1929 and 1930, respectively.

In 1918, the 1, 2, and 5 pesos p/m coins were replaced by 1, 2, and 5 centavo coins of the same size and composition. In 1942, bronze 1 and 5 centavo coins were introduced, followed by bronze 2 centavos in 1948. Between 1952 and 1958, cupro-nickel replaced silver in the 10, 20 and 50 centavos.

In 1967, copper-clad-steel 1 and 5 centavos were introduced, together with nickel-clad-steel 10, 20 and 50 centavos and cupro-nickel 1 peso coins, the 2 centavos having ceased production in 1960. In 1977, bronze 2 pesos were introduced. In 1984, production of all coins below 1 peso ended. Higher denominations were introduced in the following years of high inflation. 5 peso coins were introduced in 1980, followed by 10 pesos in 1981, 20 pesos in 1982, 50 pesos in 1986, 100 pesos in 1992, 200 pesos in 1994, 500 pesos in 1993 and 1000 pesos in 1996. However, due to massive counterfeiting problems, the 1000 pesos was withdrawn by stages. By 2002, the coin was out of circulation.

In February 2009, the central bank stopped the minting of 5-, 10-, and 20-peso coins. They were still legal tender, but due to their low value and circulation, most cash transactions were rounded to the nearest 50 or 100 pesos.

In 2012, the Bank of the Republic of Colombia issued a new series of coins with the 500 and 1000 peso coins now struck as bi-metallic coins.

2012 Coin Series
Value	Technical parameters				Description		
Value	Diameter	Thickness	Mass	Composition	Edge	Obverse	Reverse
50 pesos	17 mm	1.3 mm	2.0 g	Nickel-plated steel	Plain	The spectacled bear, its popular name, and scientific name.	Value, bordered with the words "Republic of Colombia" and the year of minting.
100 pesos	20.3 mm	1.55 mm	3.34 g	Brass-plated steel 90.8% iron, 1.2% carbon; Layers: 6.4%-7.2% copper, 3.2%-2.4% zinc	Plain	The frailejón (Espeletia Grandiflora), its popular name, and scientific name.	Value, bordered with the words "Republic of Colombia" and the year of minting.
200 pesos	22.4 mm	1.7 mm	4.61 g	65% copper 20% zinc 15% nickel	Lettered with Plain edge	The scarlet macaw, its popular name, and scientific name.	Value, bordered with the words "Republic of Colombia" and the year of minting.
500 pesos	23.7 mm	2 mm	7.14 g	Outer Ring: 65% copper 20% zinc 15% nickel Centre Plug: 92% copper 6% aluminium 2% nickel	Segmented (Plain and Reeded sections)	The glass frog, its popular name, and scientific name.	Value, bordered with the words "Republic of Colombia" and the year of minting.
1,000 pesos	26.7 mm	2.7 mm	9.95 g	Outer Ring: 92% copper 6% aluminium 2% nickel Centre Plug: 65% copper 20% zinc 15% nickel	Security	The loggerhead sea turtle, its popular name, and scientific name.	Value, bordered with the words "Republic of Colombia" and the year of minting.

Pre-2012 Coin Series
Value	Technical parameters				Description	
Value	Diameter	Thickness	Mass	Composition	Obverse	Reverse
20 pesos	17.2 mm	1.15 mm	2 g	70% copper 30% zinc	Simón Bolívar	Value
50 pesos	21 mm	1.3 mm	4.5 g	65% copper, 20 % zinc, 15 % nickel	Coat of arms of Colombia bordered with the words República de Colombia	Value
100 pesos	23 mm	1.55 mm	5.31 g	aluminium bronze 92% copper 6% aluminium 2% nickel	Coat of arms of Colombia bordered with the words República de Colombia	Value
200 pesos	24.4 mm	1.7 mm	7.08 g	65% copper 20% zinc 15% nickel	Quimbaya civilization figurine	Value
500 pesos	23.5 mm	2 mm	7.43 g	Outer Ring: 65% copper 20% zinc 15% nickel Centre Plug: 92% copper 6% aluminium 2% nickel	Guacarí's tree "El árbol de Guacarí", in recognition of the efforts by the people of Guacarí, Valle del Cauca to preserve the environment and protect the ecology	Value

== Banknotes ==
Between 1857 and 1880, five of Colombia's then provinces, Bolívar, Cauca, Cundinamarca, Panama and Santander issued their own paper money. Denominations included 10¢ and 50¢, 1, 2, 3, 5, 10, 50 and 100 pesos.

In the early 1860s, banknotes were issued in denominations of 20¢ and 1, 2, 3, 10, 20 and 100 pesos, with all denominations also given in reales. In 1881, the Banco Nacional introduced notes for 20¢, and 1, 5, 10, 20, 50 and 100 pesos. These were followed by 50¢ notes in 1882 and 10¢ in 1885. 1,000 peso notes were introduced in 1895 and 500 peso notes in 1900. In 1904, the Treasury took over paper money production, issuing 1, 2, 5, 10, 25, 50 and 100 peso notes, followed by 1,000 pesos in 1908. In 1910, the Conversion Board introduced 50 and 100 peso notes, followed by 1, 2, 5 and 10 pesos in 1915.

More than sixty retail banks issued banknotes between 1865 and 1923. Denominations issued included 10¢, 20¢, 25¢, 50¢, and 1, 2, 5, 10, 20, 25, 50, 100 and 500 pesos.

In 1923, the Banco de la República monopolized paper money production and introduced notes denominated in peso oro. The first were provisional issues, overprinted on earlier notes of the Casa de Moneda de Medellín, in denominations of 2 1/2, 5, 10 and 20 pesos. Regular issues followed for 1, 2, 5, 10, 50, 100, and 500 pesos oro. Twenty peso notes were introduced in 1927.

In 1932 and 1941, silver certificates were issued for 1 and 5 pesos plata, although 1 and 5 peso oro notes continued to be produced. Treasury notes for 5 and 10 pesos oro were issued in 1938, followed by 1/2 peso oro between 1948 and 1953. Half peso oro notes were also produced by the Banco de la República in 1943 by cutting in half 1 peso notes.

The Banco de la República introduced 200 and 1,000 peso oro notes in 1974 and 1979, respectively, whilst 1 and 2 peso oro notes ceased production in 1977, followed by 10 pesos oro in 1980, 5 pesos oro in 1981, 20 pesos in 1983 and 50 pesos in 1986. 500 pesos oro notes were introduced in 1986 with 10,000 pesos oro in 1992. Production of 100 peso oro notes ended in 1991, followed by that of the 200 pesos oro in 1992 and 500 pesos oro in 1993. In 1993, the word oro was dropped. 20,000 peso notes were introduced in 1996, followed by 50,000 pesos in 2000.

In November 2006, the 1,000 and 2,000 peso notes were reduced in size from 140 × 70 mm to 130 × 65 mm, because these notes are frequently replaced due to heavy use.

In December 2010, the Banco de la República issued a 2,000 peso note that now includes the number "2" expressed in Braille in the watermark area.

In 2016, the Banco de la Republica issued a new series of banknotes in denominations of 2,000, 5,000, 10,000, 20,000, 50,000 and 100,000 pesos, with the latter being a new and the highest denomination. These banknotes give continuity of biodiversity present in the new series of coins that began circulating in 2012, while highlighting a group of cultural elements and landscapes of Colombia's geography. Additionally, the notes pay tribute to major personalities of culture, science and politics, and reinforces recognition of women's important role in Colombian society. The new 100,000 pesos banknote was introduced on 31 March 2016, followed by the 20,000 pesos note on 30 June 2016, the 50,000 pesos note on 19 August 2016, the 5,000 pesos note on 9 November 2016, and the 2,000 pesos note on 29 November 2016. The 10,000 pesos note was issued on 7 December 2016, completing the new banknote series.

2016 Banknote series
Value	Dimensions	Background color	Description			Date of			Notes
Value	Dimensions	Background color	Obverse	Reverse	Watermark	first series	Issue	last series	Notes
2,000 pesos	128 × 66 mm	Blue	Débora Arango	Caño Cristales	The face of painter Débora Arango and the number 2	19 August 2015	29 November 2016		
5,000 pesos	133 × 66 mm	Brown	José Asunción Silva	Colombian paramos	The face of poet José Asunción Silva and the number 5	19 August 2015	9 November 2016		
10,000 pesos	138 × 66 mm	Red	Virginia Gutiérrez de Pineda	Amazon natural region	The face of anthropologist Virginia Gutiérrez and the number 10	19 August 2015	7 December 2016		
20,000 pesos	143 × 66 mm	Orange	Alfonso López Michelsen	La Mojana channels in the region of the Zenú people and the sombrero vueltiao	The face of President Alfonso López Michelsen and the number 20	19 August 2015	30 June 2016		
50,000 pesos	148 × 66 mm	Violet	Gabriel García Márquez	Lost City (core of the culture tayrona)	The face of Nobel Prize winner Gabriel García Márquez and the number 50	19 August 2015	19 August 2016		
100,000 pesos	153 × 66 mm	Green	Carlos Lleras Restrepo	Wax palm in Cocora valley, Quindío; Barranquero bird; Luis Vidales's poem about wax palm; Liberty head bank seal	The face of President Carlos Lleras Restrepo and the number 100.	8 August 2014	31 March 2016		

Pre-2016 Banknote series
Value	Dimensions	Background color	Description			Date of			Notes
Value	Dimensions	Background color	Obverse	Reverse	Watermark	first series	Issue	last series	Notes
1,000 pesos	130 × 65 mm	Orange	Jorge Eliécer Gaitán	Jorge Eliécer Gaitán (upper-half body) and a crowd	Jorge Eliécer Gaitán	August 7, 2001	November 17, 2001		
2,000 pesos	130 × 65 mm	Green and beige	Francisco de Paula Santander	The door of the Casa de la moneda	Francisco de Paula Santander	April 2, 1996			2000 pesos banknotes with the issue date of 19.08.2009 (August 19, 2009) include a Braille script added in the watermark area.
5,000 pesos	140 × 70 mm	Green	José Asunción Silva	Outdoors and the entire "Nocturno" poem in microtext font	José Asunción Silva	March 1, 1995	September 22, 1995		
10,000 pesos	140 × 70 mm	Reddish brown	Policarpa Salavarrieta	Guaduas main plaza, place of birth of Policarpa Salavarrieta	Policarpa Salavarrieta	March 1, 1995	November 30, 1995		
20,000 pesos	140 × 70 mm	Sapphire	Julio Garavito, and the Moon, a reference to the Garavito Crater	The Earth as viewed from the Moon's surface	Julio Garavito	July 23, 1996	December 2, 1996		
50,000 pesos	140 × 70 mm	Purple and white	Jorge Isaacs	A paragraph of La María	Jorge Isaacs	August 7, 2000	November 24, 2000		

Withdrawn banknotes
Value	Dimensions	Background color	Description			Date of			Notes
Value	Dimensions	Background color	Obverse	Reverse	Watermark	first series	Issue	last series	Notes
1 peso oro	140 × 70 mm	Turquoise	Santander and Bolívar	Effigy of the freedom	Without watermarks				
1 peso oro	140 × 70 mm	Indigo	Bolívar and Santander	Andean condor	Without watermarks	August 7, 1973			
2 pesos oro	140 × 70 mm	Purple	Policarpa Salavarrieta	Muisca raft. The figure refers to the ceremony of the legend of El Dorado.	Without watermarks	July 20, 1976			
5 pesos oro	140 × 70 mm	Dark green	José María Córdova	Castillo San Felipe de Barajas, Cartagena	Without watermarks	July 20, 1971			
10 pesos oro	140 × 70 mm	Purple	Antonio Nariño	San Agustín Archaeological Park	Without watermarks	August 7, 1980			
20 pesos oro	140 × 70 mm	Coffee	Francisco José de Caldas	Various archaeological items belonging to the Museo del Oro	Without watermarks				
20 pesos oro	140 × 70 mm	Purple	Francisco José de Caldas	Building of the Banco de la República in Barranquilla. Gold Museum	Without watermarks	January 2, 1961			
50 pesos oro	140 × 70 mm	Purple	Camilo Torres Tenorio	Orchidaceae (Cattleya trianae), national flower of Colombia	Camilo Torres Tenorio	July 20, 1973			
100 pesos oro	140 × 70 mm	Purple	Francisco de Paula Santander	Capitolio Nacional, Bogotá	The freedom.				
100 pesos oro	140 × 70 mm	Orange	Antonio Nariño	Villa de Leyva, Boyacá Department	Antonio Nariño	August 7, 1981			
200 pesos oro	140 × 70 mm	Dark green	Simón Bolívar	Peasant collecting coffee	Simón Bolívar				
200 pesos oro	140 × 70 mm	Dark green	José Celestino Mutis	Cloister of the Colegio Mayor de Nuestra Señora del Rosario, Bogotá	José Celestino Mutis	April 1, 1991			
500 pesos oro	140 × 70 mm	Green dark and black	Francisco de Paula Santander	Salt Cathedral of Zipaquirá	Perfil.				
500 pesos oro	140 × 70 mm	Coffee	Francisco de Paula Santander	Casa de la Moneda, Bogotá	Perfil.	July 20, 1986			
1000 pesos oro	140 × 70 mm	Brown and green	José Antonio Galán	Casa de Nariño, Bogotá	José Antonio Galán	April 1, 1979			
1000 pesos oro	140 × 70 mm	Turquoise	Simón Bolívar	Monument to the Lancers, Boyacá Department	Simón Bolívar	January 1, 1982		1997	
2000 pesos oro	140 × 70 mm	Brown	Simón Bolívar	Pass of El Libertador Simon Bolivar over the Pisba Tableland, work of Francisco Antonio Cano	Simón Bolívar	January 1, 1984		1994	
5000 pesos oro	140 × 70 mm	Purple	Rafael Núñez	Miguel Antonio Caro, the shield and the States that made up the United States of Colombia	Rafael Núñez	August 5, 1986		1994	
10,000 pesos oro	140 × 70 mm	Coffee	Emberá people	Birds of the fauna of Colombia and the map of Waldseemüller (1507)	Emberá people			1994	

== Use in Venezuela ==
The crisis in Venezuela has caused an economic crisis in which the value of the bolívar declined rapidly, resulting in hyperinflation. Some areas in Venezuela informally accept the peso for transactions, alongside the United States dollar.

The currency sees widespread acceptance in the Venezuelan border state of Táchira, with occasional acceptance in Apure, Barinas, Mérida, and Zulia. As of late 2025, the peso remains the main currency used in the majority of transactions made in Táchira, with the bolívar still occasionally used.

== Unidad de Valor Real (UVR) ==
The Unidad de Valor Real ("real value unit", UVR, ISO 4217 code COU) is an accounting currency, maintained by the Banco de la República, that reflects inflation and purchase power. It is used to calculate the cost of housing loans which allows financial entities to maintain the purchasing power of borrowed money.

Current COP exchange rates
From Google Finance:	AUD CAD CHF CNY EUR GBP HKD JPY USD BRL INR
From Yahoo! Finance:	AUD CAD CHF CNY EUR GBP HKD JPY USD BRL INR
From XE.com:	AUD CAD CHF CNY EUR GBP HKD JPY USD BRL INR
From OANDA:	AUD CAD CHF CNY EUR GBP HKD JPY USD BRL INR

== See also ==
- Economy of Colombia
- Mexican peso
- Vertical currency

== Bibliography ==
- Krause, Chester L.; Clifford Mishler (1991). Standard Catalog of World Coins: 1801–1991 (18th ed.). Krause Publications. ISBN 0873411501.
- Pick, Albert (1994). Bruce, Colin R. II; Shafer, Neil (eds.). Standard Catalog of World Paper Money: General Issues (7th ed.). Krause Publications. ISBN 0-87341-207-9.
