= Chrétien (crater) =

Lunar impact crater

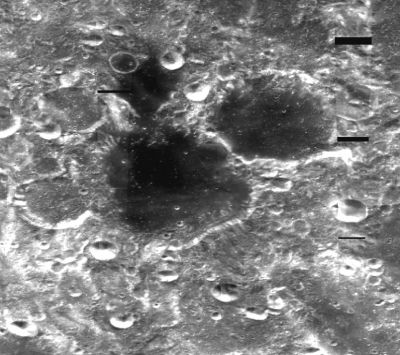
- Clementine mosaic
- Coordinates: 45.9°S 162.9°E
- Diameter: 98.63 km (61.29 mi)
- Depth: Unknown
- Colongitude: 198° at sunrise
- Formation: Nectarian
- Eponym: Henri Chrétien

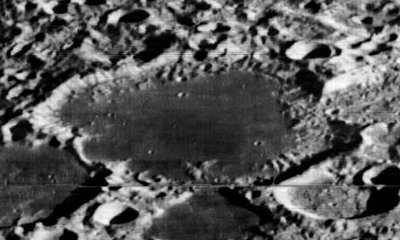
Oblique Lunar Orbiter 2 view, facing south

Chrétien is a lunar impact crater that is located in the southern hemisphere on the far side of the Moon from the Earth. It lies due south of the Mare Ingenii, one of the few maria on the Moon's far side. The crater lies in the midpoint between the craters Garavito to the west-southwest and Oresme to the east-northeast, both of these being somewhat smaller than Chrétien.

On the lunar geologic timescale, this crater dates to the Nectarian period. The crater has a low albedo interior floor, which has the same darker hue as the Mare Ingenii to the north. This floor dates to the Imbrian epoch, and has a thickness of 0.4 km (0.25 mi). The irregular satellite crater Chrétien C, which shares the straight and narrow northeastern rim of Chrétien, is also covered with this dark basaltic lava. The outer rim of Chrétien is irregular in shape, with several other satellite craters intruding into the sides. The most notable of these are Chrétien S across the southwest rim, and Chrétien W attached to the northwest rim.

The northern rim of Chrétien has a break that joins a small, irregular plain. This area has been resurfaced by the same lava flows that covered the interior of Chrétien. At the southern end, the inner wall forms a wide, irregular surface while the damaged rim bulges outward to the south.

This crater was named after the French mathematician and astronomer Henri Chrétien (1870–1956). Its designation was formally adopted by the International Astronomical Union in 1970. Previously, the crater was known as Crater 427.

== Satellite craters ==
By convention these features are identified on lunar maps by placing the letter on the side of the crater midpoint that is closest to Chrétien.

Chrétien	Latitude	Longitude	Diameter
A	43.9° S	163.6° E	13 km
C	44.5° S	165.3° E	63 km
S	46.5° S	160.5° E	40 km
W	44.3° S	160.8° E	34 km
