= Sombrero vueltiao =

Traditional Colombian hat

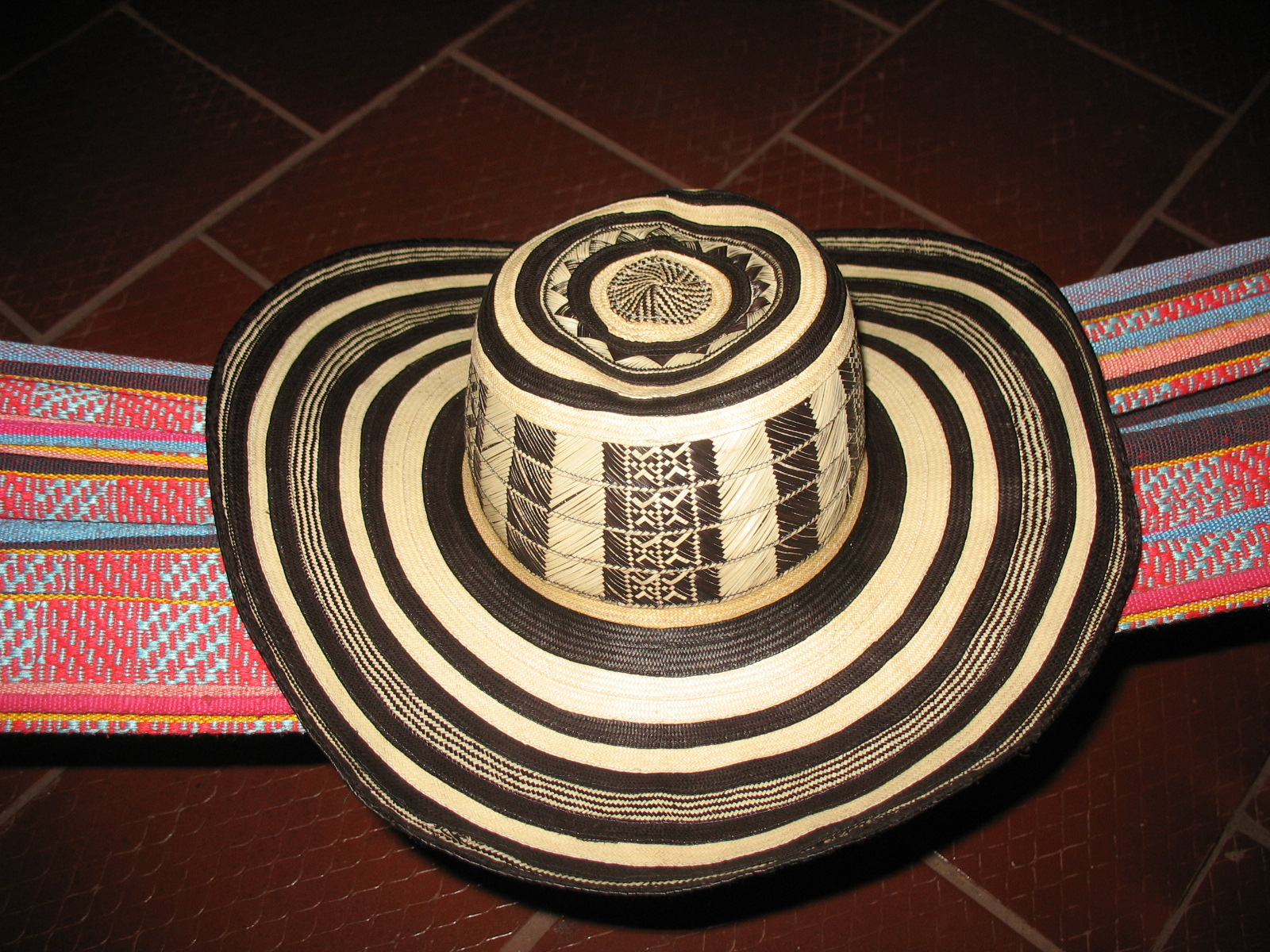
- An example of a sombrero vueltiao.
- Type: Hat
- Place of origin: Tuchin

The sombrero vueltiao is a traditional hat originating from the indigenous Zenú people of Colombia. Its popularity has made it a symbol of the country. It is traditionally made from various palm plants native to the region.

== Origin and history ==
The word vueltiao is a regionalism from the northern caribbean region of Colombia, in the areas surrounding the Magdalena River basin; it originates in the word for 'turn' or 'lap' (Spanish: vuelta), and comes from the way the hat is made.

The traditional hat originates from the indigenous Zenú people whose ancestral territory is located in the San Jorge and Sinú River valleys within what is now the Córdoba and Sucre Departments.

In 2013, with the goal of protecting indigenous production of the vueltiao, the government of Colombia implemented a fine of up to $520 million COP for vendors buying counterfeit versions of the hat from China.

== Construction ==
A sombrero vueltiao is made from caña flecha, material sourced from several species of palm native to the region, including sabanera from the interior coastal region, costera, and criolla from Córdoba Department.

The quality of the hat is determined by the number of pairs of fibers braided together to make it and its flexibility. The more flexible the hat is, the higher quality it is.

== Variations ==
The Quinciano is the most traditional variation of the sombrero vueltiao as well as the cheapest and most simple in design. 15 pairs of caña flecha strips are used in the design.

== National symbol of Colombia ==
The popularity of the sombrero vueltiao has made it a national symbol of Colombia recognized abroad. In 2004, it was officially named a National Cultural Symbol by the government of Colombia through Law 908.

== Gallery ==
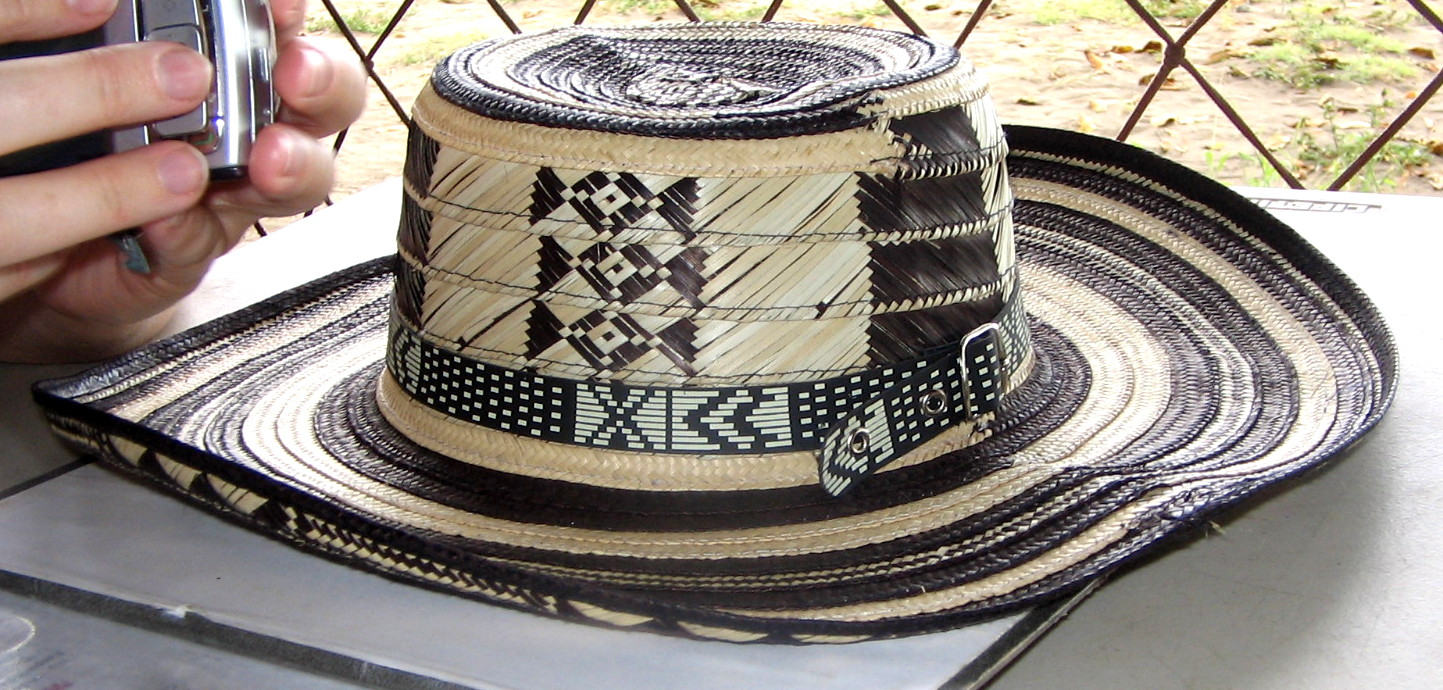
An example of a sombrero vueltiao, pattern visible.

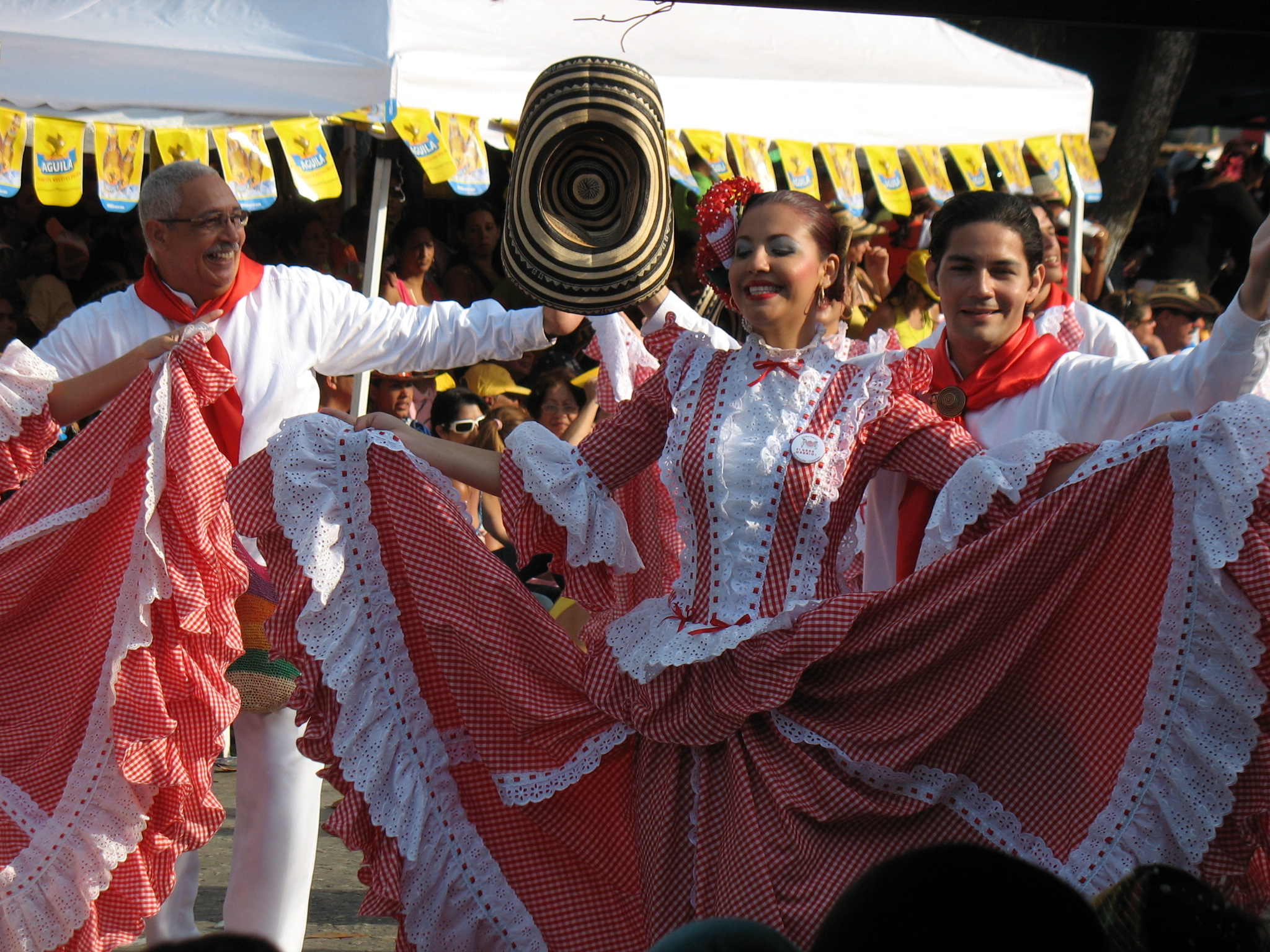
A cumbia dancer holding a sombrero vueltiao.

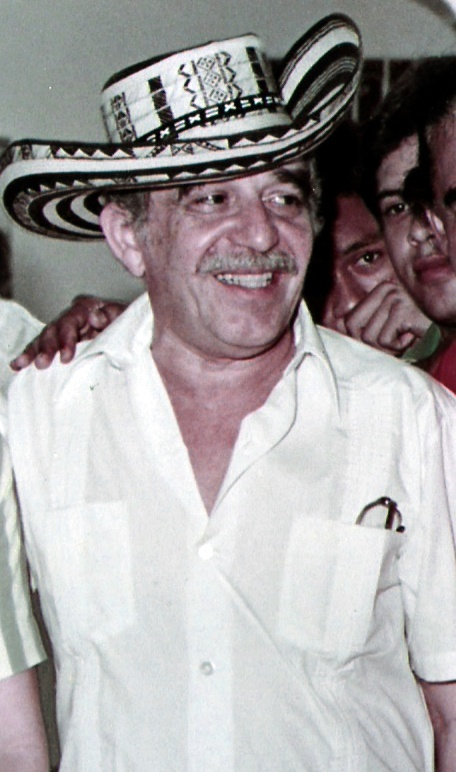
Gabriel García Márquez wearing a sombrero vueltiao.

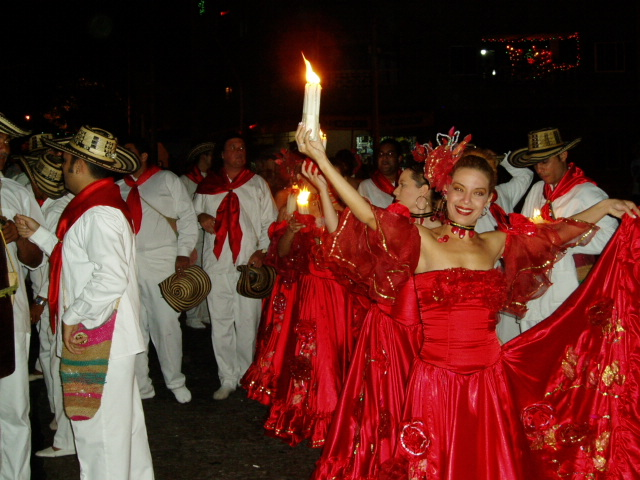
Multiple people seen wearing sombreros vueltiaos at the Barranquilla's Carnival.

== See also ==
- Arhuaca mochila
- Ruana
- List of hat styles
