= Colombian real =

Currency of Colombia until 1837

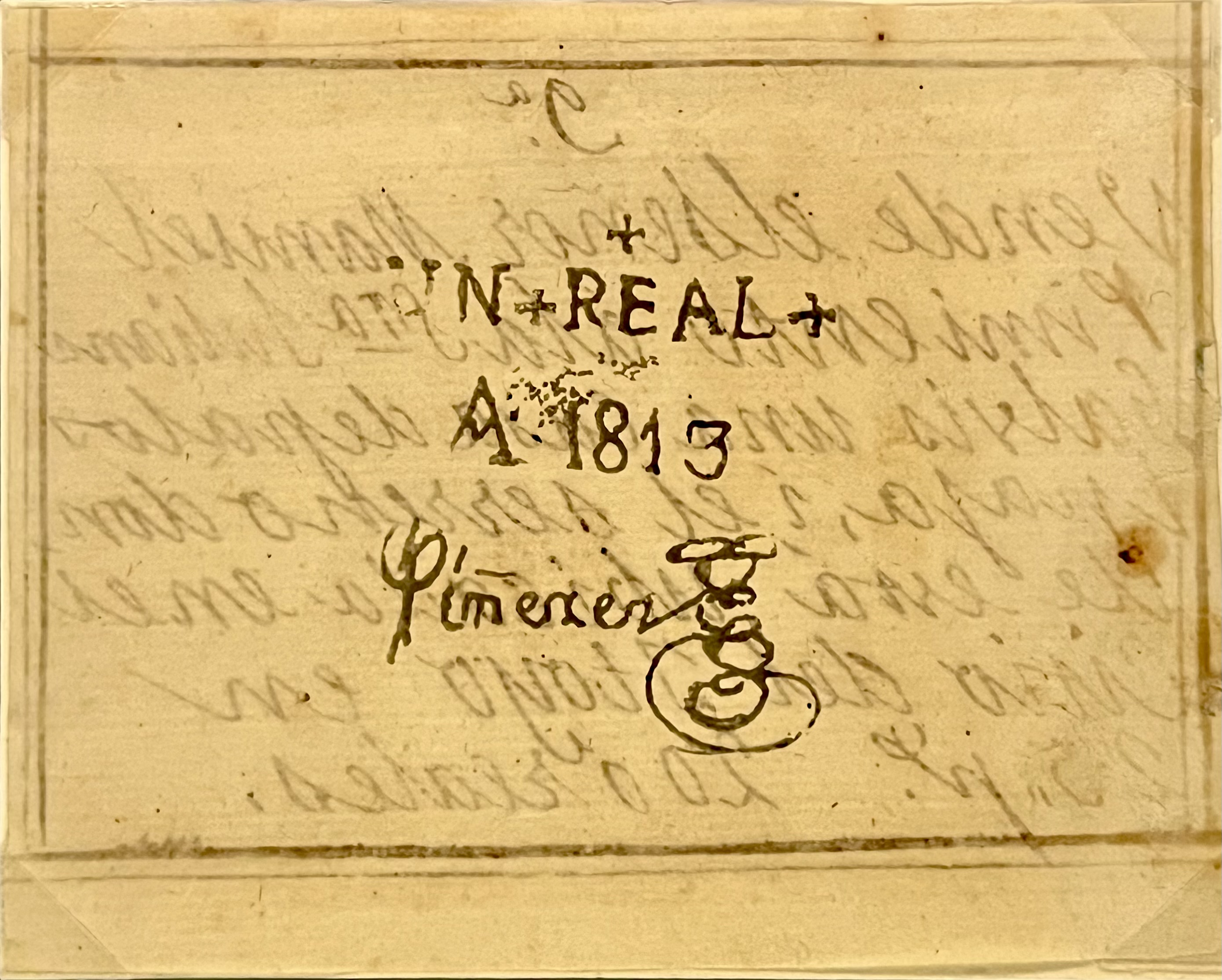
One real banknote from Mompox, 1813

The real was the currency of Colombia until 1837. No subdivisions of the real existed until after the real had ceased to be the primary unit of currency. However, 8 reales = 1 peso and 16 reales = 1 escudo.

== History ==
Until 1820, Colombia used the Spanish colonial real, some of which were minted in Bogotá and Popayán. After 1820, issues were made specifically for Colombia, under the various names that the state used. In 1837, the peso, worth 8 reales, became the primary unit of currency. The real continued to circulate as an eighth of a peso until 1847, when a new real was introduced worth one tenth of a peso and subdivided into 10 decimos de real. This new real was renamed the decimo in 1853, although coins denominated in reales were again issued 1859-1862 and in 1880.

== Coins ==
During the Spanish colonial period, silver 1/4, 1/2, 1, 2, 4 and 8 reales and gold 1, 2, 4 and 8 escudos were struck at Bogotá and Popayán, the last of which were produced in 1820. During the war of independence, regional issues were made by royalists in Popayán and Santa Marta, and by republicans in Cartagena and Cundinamarca. Popayán issued copper 1/2, 2 and 8 real coins, Santa Marta issued copper 1/4 and 1/2 real and silver 2 reales, Cartagena issued copper 1/2 and 2 reales, and Cundinamarca issued silver 1/4, 1/2, 1 and 2 reales. Cundinamarca went on to issue silver 1/2, 1, 2 and 8 reales between 1820 and 1823.

The United Provinces of New Granada issued silver coins in denominations of 1/2, 1, 2 and 8 reales between 1819 and 1822. These were followed by coins of the Republic of Colombia, silver 1/4, 1/2, 1 and 8 reales, and gold 1 peso, 1, 2, 4 and 8 escudos.

== Banknotes ==
Around 1819, notes were issued by the government in denominations of 1/2, 1, 2 and 4 reales, also denominated as 6 1/4, 12 1/2, 25 and 50 centavos. These were followed, some time in the 1820s, by notes for 1, 2, 3 and 5 pesos.
