= Spanish colonial real =

Spanish colonial coinage

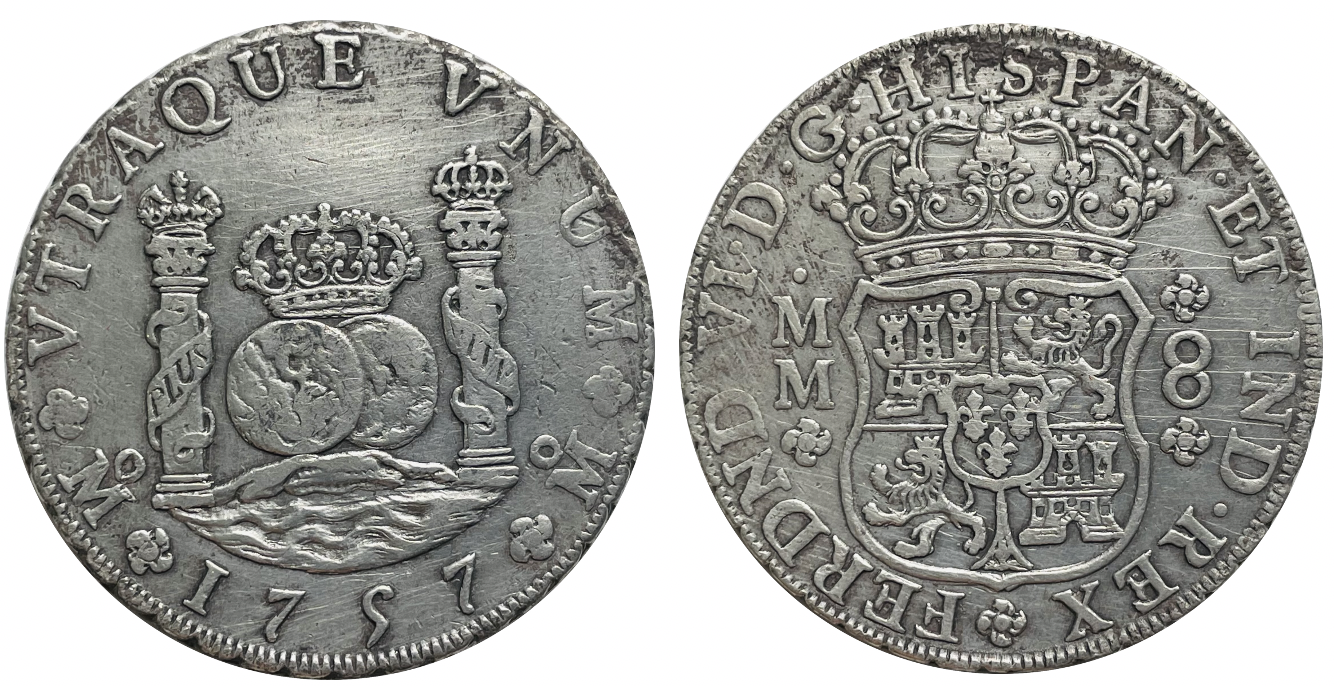
Silver coin: 8 reales Fernando VI, Viceroyalty of New Spain - 1757 MM

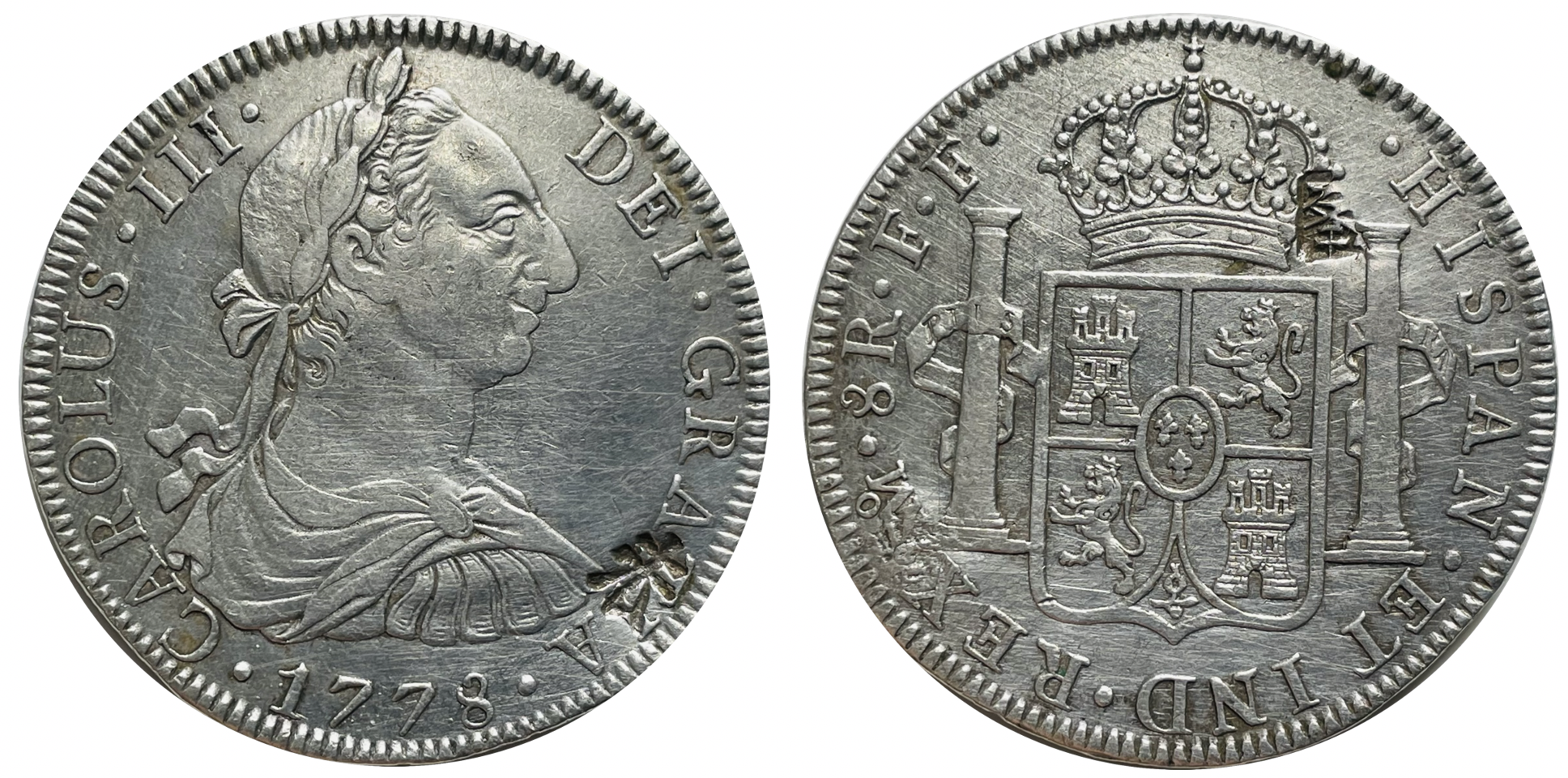
Silver coin: 8 reales Carlos III, Viceroyalty of New Spain - 1778 FF chopmark

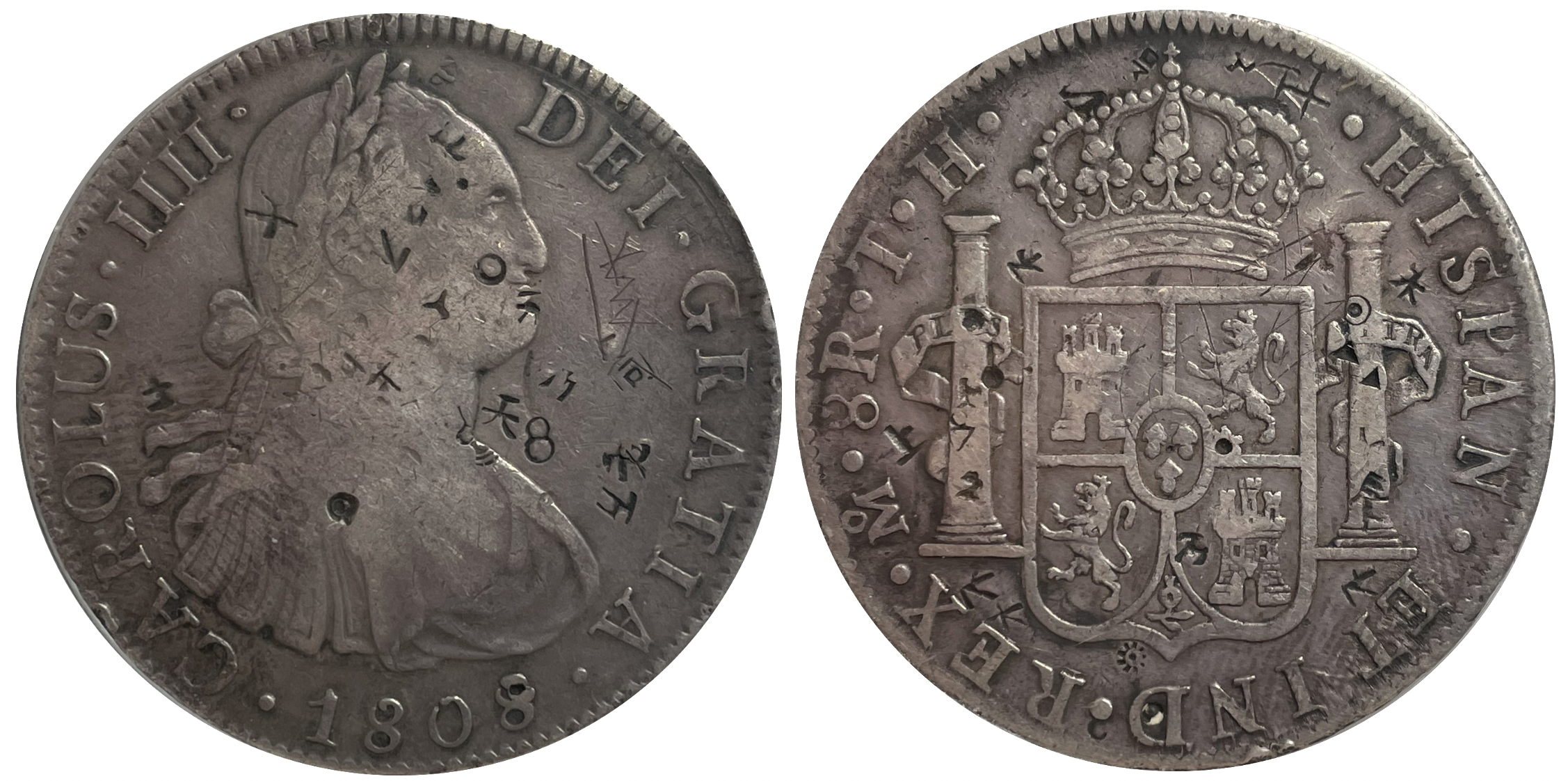
Silver coin: 8 reales Carlos IV, Viceroyalty of New Spain - 1808 chopmark

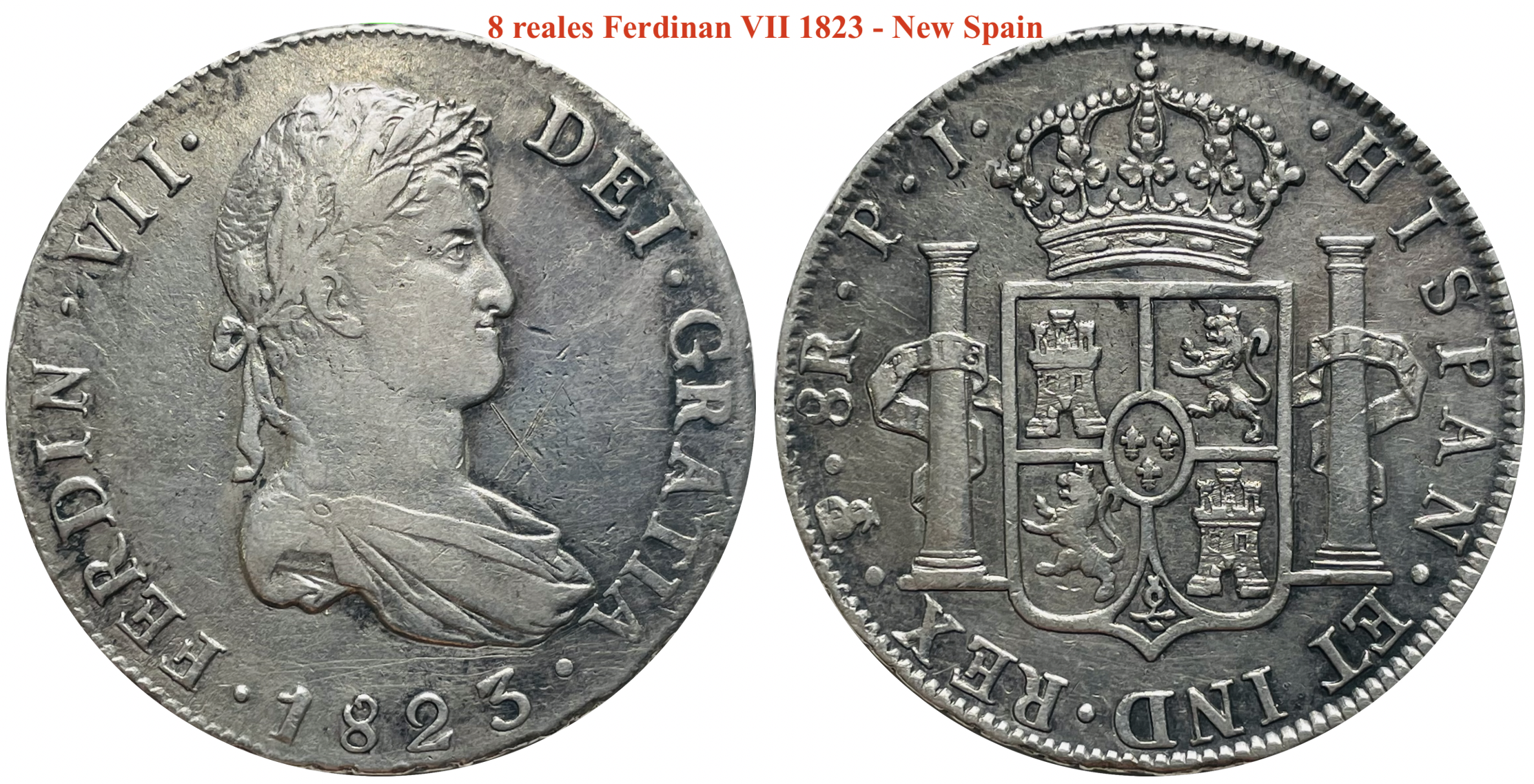
Silver coin: 8 reales Fernando VII, Viceroyalty of Rio de la Plata - 1823 PTSPJ

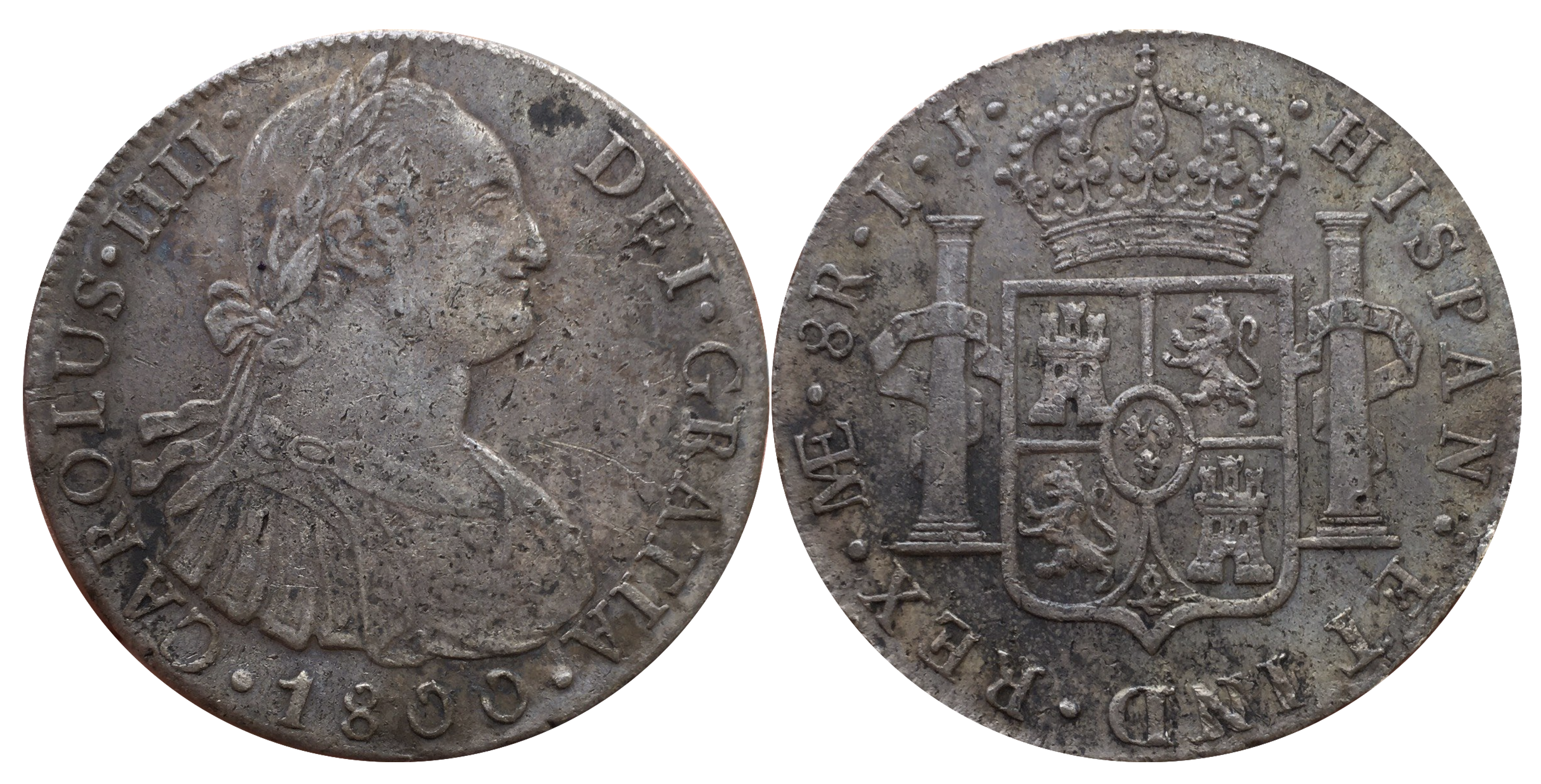
Silver coin: 8 reales Carlos IV, Viceroyalty of Peru - 1800

The silver real (Spanish: real de plata) was the currency of the Spanish colonies in America and the Philippines. In the seventeenth century the silver real was established at two billon reales (reales de vellón) or sixty-eight maravedíes. Gold escudos (worth 16 reales) were also issued. The coins circulated throughout Spain's colonies and beyond, with the eight-real piece, known in English as the Spanish dollar, becoming an international standard and spawning, among other currencies, the United States dollar. A reform in 1737 set the silver real at two and half billon reales (reales de vellón) or eighty-five maravedís. This coin, called the real de plata fuerte, became the new standard, issued as coins until the early 19th century. The gold escudo was worth 16 reales de plata fuerte.

== History ==
Coins were produced at mints in Bogotá, Caracas, Guatemala City, Lima, Mexico City, Popayán, Potosí, Santo Domingo and Santiago. For details, see the:

- Colombian reales
- Mexican reales
- Peruvian reales
- Santo Domingo reales
- Venezuelan reales

After the independence of Spain's colonies, the real was replaced by currencies also denominated in reales and escudos, including the Argentine real, Central American Republic real, Ecuadorian real, Honduran real, Paraguayan real and Santo Domingo real.

== Coins ==
From 1572 to 1773 Spanish colonial silver coins were cobs. Initially cut from a silver bar and hammer struck on a coin die, they were accurate in weight, though sometimes debased in precious metal content. However unlike machined coins, they were often irregular in shape, especially if a too-thick coin was clipped by the mint to reach the proper weight. After 1732 similar, but better shaped cobs were produced on screw presses. Cob denominations were 1/2, 1, 2, 4, and 8 reales. When circulating in New England the larger coins might be cut to give intermediate values; since a real was nicknamed a "bit", the expression "two bits" came to mean a quarter dollar.

Unlike in Spain, the copper coins were generally not struck by the colonial mints. Most issued silver coins in denominations of 1/4, 1/2, 1, 2, 4 and 8 reales and gold coins for 1/2, 1, 2, 4 and 8 escudos. Exceptions were the Santo Domingo mint, which did strike maravedíes in the sixteenth century and the Caracas mint which issued fraction of real copper coins in the early nineteenth century to facilitate commerce.

== Columnarios ==
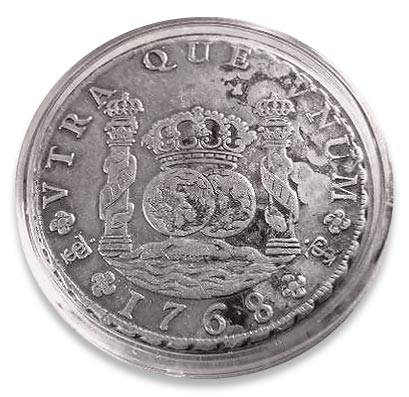
A Spanish colonial silver coin, minted in Potosí in 1768, featuring the columns and the hemispheres

Columnarios are silver coins that were minted by Spain from 1732 to 1773 throughout its New World colonies. While the majority of columnarios were struck in Mexico, smaller mints existed in Guatemala; Lima, Peru; Santiago, Chile; Potosí, Bolivia; and Colombia. The base denomination is an 8 reales coin (aka Piece of eight or Spanish dollar). Other minor denominations included 4 reales, 2 reales, 1 real, and 1/2 real. The 8 reales coin is the predecessor to the American dollar. Before the United States Mint was in production, columnarios circulated, along with other coinage, in the US colonies, as legal tender until the middle of the 19th century.

Prior to the columnario, Spanish coins were hammer struck. These rather crude looking coins were called cobs. Clipping was a problem with cobs as it was easy to shave small amounts of silver from their edges, and although this action was punishable by death, it was still a widespread occurrence. The columnario, unlike the odd-shaped cob, is a round coin with milled edges which makes clipping detectable and less likely to occur.

The design of the columnario consists on the reverse of two worlds — representing the new world and old world — with a royal crown above. Below are the waves of the sea that separate the worlds and on the left and right are columns (hence the name "columnarios") representing the Pillars of Hercules adorned with crowns and wrapped with a banner spelling "PLUS ULTRA", meaning "more beyond". The reverse also has the letters "VTRAQUE VNUM", referring to the Old and New Worlds, "Both are One", and the date at the bottom, with mint marks on both sides.

The obverse features the crown's name followed by "D G HISPAN ET IND REX", meaning, "By the Grace of God, King of Spain and the Indies." The assayer's mark is on the left and the denomination on the right of a large Spanish shield which is adorned with a royal crown atop. Various florets, rosettes, stops, and other features are used to separate features.

The edge has a repeating laurel leaf design which is very difficult to counterfeit and is often used for authentication purposes.

== See also ==
- Currency of Spanish America
- Peso
- Spanish dollar
- Spanish escudo
- Spanish real
- Viceroyalty
