= Julio Garavito Armero =

Colombian astronomer and mathematician

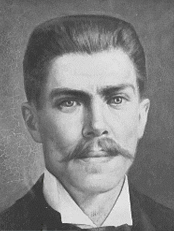
- Born: 5 January 1865; Bogotá, Colombia
- Died: 11 March 1920 (aged 55)
- Scientific career
- Fields: Astronomy (Celestial mechanics)
- Workplaces: es:Observatorio Astronómico Nacional de Colombia

Julio Garavito Armero (5 January 1865 – 11 March 1920) was a Colombian astronomer.

== Life ==
Born in Bogotá, he was a child prodigy in science and mathematics. He obtained his degrees as mathematician and civil engineer in the Universidad Nacional de Colombia (National University of Colombia). In 1892, he worked as the director of the Observatorio Astronómico Nacional (National Astronomical Observatory). His investigative works had been published in Los Anales de Ingeniería (The Annals of Engineering) since 1890, seven years before he took over editing the publication.

In his youth he studied at San Bartolomé high school, but in 1885 he had to interrupt his studies temporarily because of the civil wars which were affecting his home country. During the Thousand Days War, Garavito was part of a secret scientific society called El Círculo de los Nueve Puntos (the nine-point circle), where the condition for admission was to solve a problem about Euler's theorem. This group was active until Garavito's death. As an astronomer of the observatory, he did many useful scientific investigations such as calculating the latitude of Bogotá, studies about the comets which passed by the Earth between 1901 and 1910 (such as Comet Halley), and the 1916 solar eclipse (seen in the majority of Colombia).

But perhaps the most important were his studies about celestial mechanics, which finally turned into studies about lunar fluctuations and their influence on weather, floods, polar ice, and the Earthorbital acceleration (this was corroborated later). He worked also in other areas such as optics (this work was left unfinished at his death), and economics, by which he helped the country recover from the rough civil war. With this objective, he gave lectures and conferences in economics and the human factors which affected it, such as war or overpopulation.

He was later the director of the Chorographic Commission, created with the objectives of developing the Colombian railways and defining the frontier with Venezuela. He is believed to have questioned Albert Einstein's theory of relativity.

He has been compared to two great scientists of the 19th century: Spanish José Celestino Mutis and Neogranadine (modern day Colombia) Francisco José de Caldas.

== Legacy ==
A crater on the Moon's far side is named Garavito after him. One of the most prestigious universities in Colombia is also named after him: Escuela Colombiana de Ingeniería (Colombian School of Engineering "Julio Garavito"), created in 1972, with a special emphasis in Applied Sciences and Engineering.

His face appeared on the 20,000 colombian peso bill, with the Moon on the same side of the bill, and the Earth as viewed from the Moon's surface on the other side. Because of this, and the blue colour of the bill, there is a local folk superstition that bringing offerings of blue candles and blue flowers to his grave in the Central Cemetery of Bogotá and praying there can help one to become wealthy.
