= Garavito (crater) =

Crater on the Moon

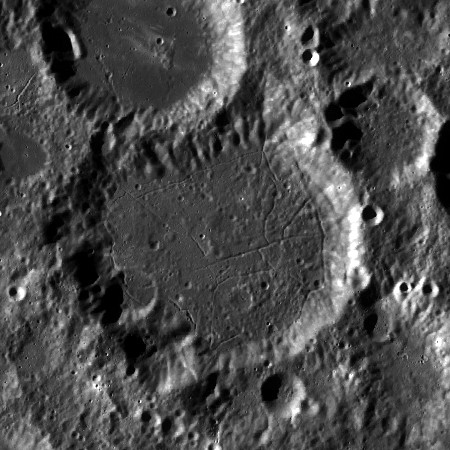
- LRO image
- Coordinates: 47.5°S 156.7°E
- Diameter: 81.05 km (50.36 mi)
- Depth: Unknown
- Colongitude: 204° at sunrise
- Eponym: Julio Garavito

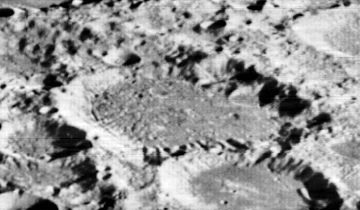
Oblique Lunar Orbiter 2 view, facing south

Garavito is a degraded lunar impact crater that is located in the southern hemisphere on the Moon's far side. It lies within the enormous South Pole-Aitken basin, to the north-northwest of the huge walled plain named Poincaré, and to the west of the crater Chrétien.

This crater has a worn and eroded outer rim, particularly along the west and southern edges. Along the northern rim, the satellite crater Garavito Y intrudes into the rim, and its outer flanks spread onto the interior floor of Garavito. A smaller crater Garavito D is attached to the northeastern exterior. The interior floor is relatively featureless, with a few tiny craterlets and the faint remains of old impacts.

This formation is named after Colombian astronomer Julio Garavito Armero (1865-1920). Its designation was formally adopted in 1970 by the International Astronomical Union. Previously, the crater was identified as Crater 424.

== Satellite craters ==
By convention these features are identified on lunar maps by placing the letter on the side of the crater mid-point that is closest to Garavito crater.

Garavito	Latitude	Longitude	Diameter
C	45.0° S	159.0° E	25 km
D	46.6° S	158.8° E	33 km
Q	49.6° S	153.6° E	42 km
Y	45.5° S	15.6° E	52 km

There is a high albedo patch on the interior floor of Garavito Y.
