= 1650 =

1650 in various calendars
- Gregorian calendar: 1650; MDCL
- Ab urbe condita: 2403
- Armenian calendar: 1099; ԹՎ ՌՂԹ
- Assyrian calendar: 6400
- Balinese saka calendar: 1571–1572
- Bengali calendar: 1056–1057
- Berber calendar: 2600
- English Regnal year: 1 Cha. 2 – 2 Cha. 2 (Interregnum)
- Buddhist calendar: 2194
- Burmese calendar: 1012
- Byzantine calendar: 7158–7159
- Chinese calendar: 己丑年 (Earth Ox); 4347 or 4140 — to — 庚寅年 (Metal Tiger); 4348 or 4141
- Coptic calendar: 1366–1367
- Discordian calendar: 2816
- Ethiopian calendar: 1642–1643
- Hebrew calendar: 5410–5411
- Hindu calendars
- Vikram Samvat: 1706–1707
- Shaka Samvat: 1571–1572
- Kali Yuga: 4750–4751
- Holocene calendar: 11650
- Igbo calendar: 650–651
- Iranian calendar: 1028–1029
- Islamic calendar: 1059–1061
- Japanese calendar: Keian 3 (慶安３年)
- Javanese calendar: 1571–1572
- Julian calendar: Gregorian minus 10 days
- Korean calendar: 3983
- Minguo calendar: 262 before ROC 民前262年
- Nanakshahi calendar: 182
- Thai solar calendar: 2192–2193
- Tibetan calendar: ས་མོ་གླང་ལོ་ (female Earth-Ox); 1776 or 1395 or 623 — to — ལྕགས་ཕོ་སྟག་ལོ་ (male Iron-Tiger); 1777 or 1396 or 624

September 3: Battle of Dunbar

1650 (MDCL) was a common year starting on Saturday of the Gregorian calendar and a common year starting on Tuesday of the Julian calendar, the 1650th year of the Common Era (CE) and Anno Domini (AD) designations, the 650th year of the 2nd millennium, the 50th year of the 17th century, and the 1st year of the 1650s decade. As of the start of 1650, the Gregorian calendar was 10 days ahead of the Julian calendar, which remained in localized use until 1923.

== Events ==
=== January–March ===
- January 7 – Prince Louis I of Anhalt-Köthen, dies after a reign of more than 63 years. The area is now part of the northeastern German state of Saxony-Anhalt.
- January 18 – Cardinal Jules Mazarin, the Chief Minister of France and head of its government since 1642, learns of a plot against him and has the Prince de Condé, the Prince de Conti and the Duc de Longueville arrested, prompting a rebellion by parliament against the Crown.
- January 25 – As part of the purges following the Great Potosí Mint Fraud of 1649 Francisco Gómez de la Rocha, a rich former corregidor of Potosí, is executed.
- January 28 – The Sultan bin Saif of Oman expels the Portuguese colonial government from Muscat, forcing the surrender of the port of Muttrah and of Fort Capitan, and captures two warships, ending 35 years of Portuguese occupation.
- February 1 – The French verse play Andromède, commissioned by Cardinal Mazarin, written by Pierre Corneille and with elaborate sets designed by Giacomo Torelli, premieres before the royal family at the Théâtre Royal de Bourbon.
- February 13 – Oliver Cromwell's troops sweep through Ireland and bombard the Kiltinan Castle in County Tipperary.
- February 26 – Jacob van Kittensteyn succeeds Joan Maetsuycker as the Dutch Governor of Zeylan (now the nation of Sri Lanka).
- March 10
  - João Rodrigues de Vasconcelos, Portuguese Count of Castelo Melhor, becomes the new Governor of Brazil.
  - The Commonwealth of England's navy Robert Blake blockades a surviving English Royalist fleet commanded by Prince Rupert of the Rhine in the Tagus estuary at Lisbon. Rupert breaks out on October 12.
- March 28 – The Siege of Kilkenny in Ireland by Oliver Cromwell ends in after six days as royalist Sir Walter Butler turns over control of the city to the Commonwealth of England forces.

=== April–June ===
- April 27 – The Battle of Carbisdale begins when a Royalist army invades mainland Scotland from the Orkney Islands. The Royalists are defeated by a Covenanter army.
- May 17 – A quarter of the New Model Army at the Siege of Clonmel in Ireland is trapped and killed.
- June 9 – The Harvard Corporation, the more powerful of the two administrative boards of Harvard, is established (the first legal corporation in the Americas).
- June 23 – Claimant King Charles II of England, Scotland and Ireland arrives in Scotland (at Garmouth), the only one of the three kingdoms that has accepted him as ruler.

=== July–September ===
- July 1 – Einkommende Zeitungen, the first daily printed newspaper, begins publication in Leipzig (ceases 1918).
- July 13 – Italian priest and astronomer Gerolamo Sersale of Naples takes advantage of a full moon and draws an extremely detailed lunar map, which is then engraved and reproduced for other astronomers.
- July 22 – Having completed his invasion of Ireland, England's General Oliver Cromwell begins the war against the Kingdom of Scotland, crossing from Northumberland at Berwick-upon-Tweed into Berwickshire, and leads troops toward Edinburgh.
- July 29 – William II of Orange, stadtholder of Holland, attempts to conquer the rest of the Netherlands and attempts a coup d'état against the Dutch Republic.
- August 13 – Colonel George Monck forms Monck's Regiment of Foot, forerunner of the Coldstream Guards.
- September 3 – Third English Civil War: Battle of Dunbar (1650) – Parliamentarian forces under Oliver Cromwell defeat a Scottish army, commanded by David Leslie.
- September 19 – Treaty of Hartford: the English Commonwealth's Connecticut Colony and the Dutch Republic's colony of New Netherland establish their frontiers in North America.
- September 27 – The Kolumbo volcano on Santorini experiences a massive eruption (VEI 6).
- September 29 – Henry Robinson opens his Office of Addresses and Encounters, a form of employment exchange, in Threadneedle Street, London.

=== October–December ===
- October 17 – The Western Remonstrance is signed by members of the Parliament of Scotland who condemn the recognition of Charles II being crowned King of Scotland, and pledging allegiance to England's General Oliver Cromwell.
- October 20 – Christina, Queen of Sweden, who has been the legal ruler of Sweden for almost 18 years, has an elaborate coronation ceremony at the castle of Jacobsdal near Stockholm. The coronation had originally been planned for her 18th birthday in 1644 but was delayed by a war with Denmark-Norway.
- October 30 – The Commonwealth of England government passes a law prohibiting trade between English merchants and English colonies that had sided with Charles II over Oliver Cromwell. Specifically labeled as rebel colonies for purposes of the ban are the North American colonies of Virginia and the Somers Isles (alias Bermuda), as well as the Caribbean islands of Barbados and Antigua.
- November 4 – William III of Orange becomes Prince of the House of Orange at the moment of his birth, succeeding his father, who had died a few days earlier. He does not become stadtholder, so the United Provinces becomes a true republic.
- December 14 – Anne Greene is hanged at Oxford Castle in England for infanticide, having concealed an illegitimate stillbirth. The following day she revives in the dissection room and, being pardoned, lives until 1659.
- December 25 – Thomas Cooper, former Usher of Gresham's School, England, is hanged as a Royalist rebel.

=== Date unknown ===
- The first modern Palio di Siena horserace is held in Italy.
- Puritans chop down the original Glastonbury Thorn in England.
- English highwayman and Captain James Hind campaigns for the Royalist cause (according to his own account).
- Jews are allowed to return to France.
- Three-wheeled wheelchairs are invented in Nuremberg by watchmaker Stephan Farffler.
- Ethiopia deports Portuguese diplomats and missionaries.
- The town of Sharon, Massachusetts is founded.
- Estimation – Istanbul becomes the largest city of the world, taking the lead from Beijing.

== Births ==
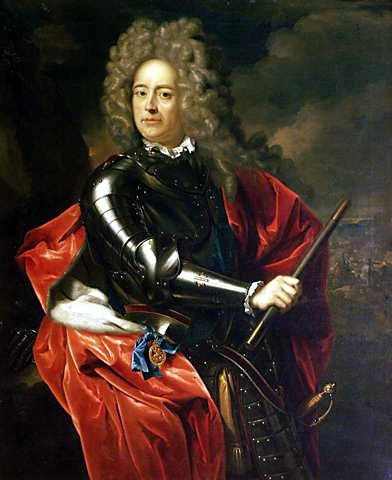
John Churchill, 1st Duke of Marlborough

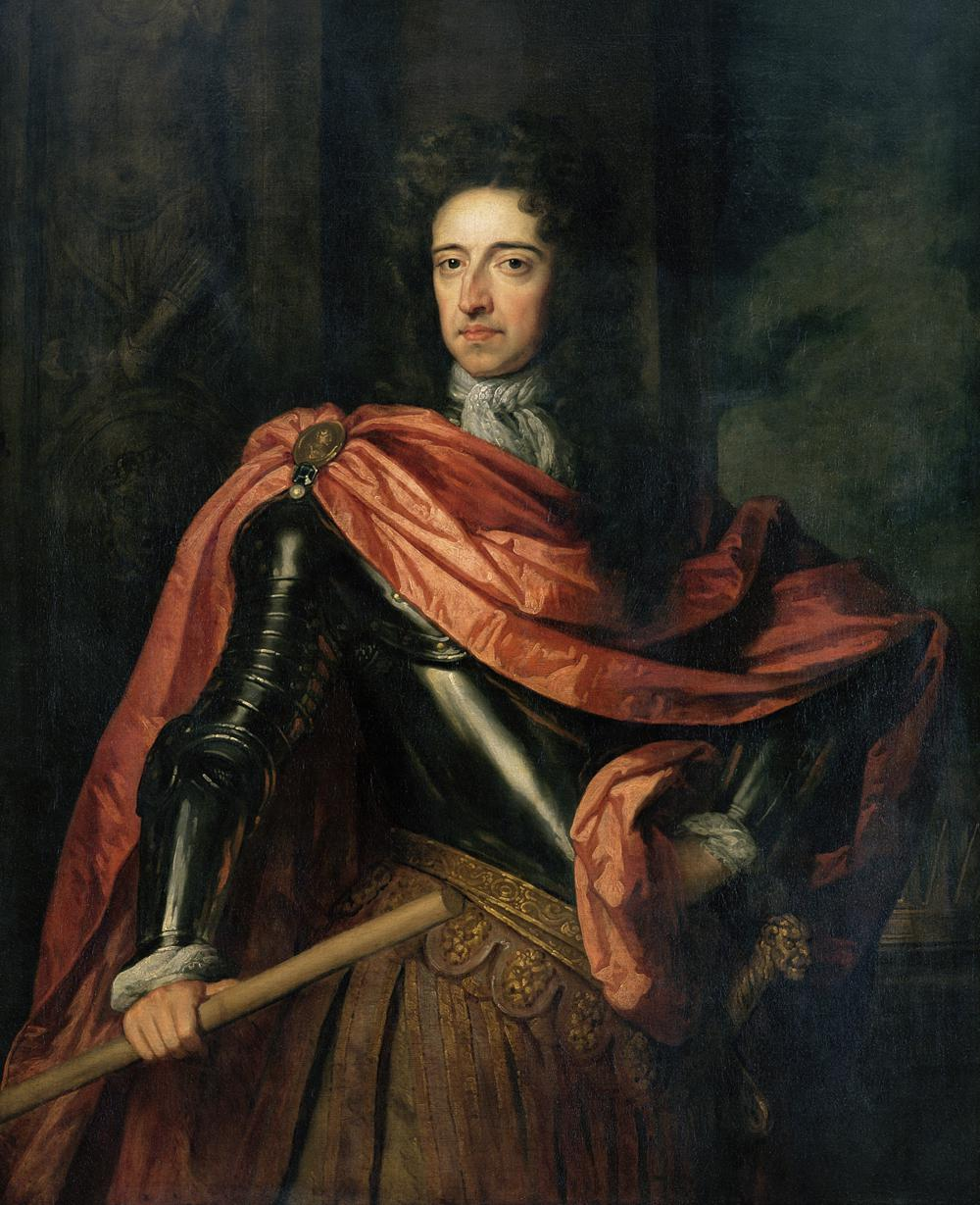
William III of England

- January 1 – George Rooke, Royal Navy admiral (d. 1709)
- January 10 – Countess Sophie Amalie of Nassau-Siegen, Duchess consort of Courland (1682–1688) (d. 1688)
- February 2 – Nell Gwyn, English actress and royal mistress (d. 1687)
- February 5 – Anne-Jules, 2nd duc de Noailles, French general (d. 1708)
- February 26 – Tomás Marín de Poveda, 1st Marquis of Cañada Hermosa, Royal Governor of Chile (d. 1703)
- February 27 – Jan Verkolje, Dutch painter (d. 1693)
- March 6 – John Conyers (MP born 1650), English politician (d. 1725)
- March 24 – Sir Jonathan Trelawny, 3rd Baronet, British bishop (d. 1721)
- March 25
  - Sir Richard Cox, 1st Baronet, England (d. 1733)
  - Ernest, Count of Stolberg-Ilsenburg, German nobleman (d. 1710)
- April 10 – Sebastiano Antonio Tanara, Spanish Catholic cardinal (d. 1724)
- April 15 – Hedwig of the Palatinate-Sulzbach, Archduchess of Austria, Duchess of Saxe-Lauenburg (d. 1681)
- April 18 – Sir Edward Dering, 3rd Baronet, English politician (d. 1689)
- April 20
  - Felice Boselli, Italian painter (d. 1732)
  - William Bedloe, English fraudster and informer (d. 1680)
- April 27 – Charlotte Amalie of Hesse-Kassel, Queen Consort of Denmark (1670–1699) (d. 1714)
- May 19 – Cornelis HrR Ridder de Graeff, Dutch nobleman and chief landholder of the Zijpe and Haze Polder (d. 1678)
- May 26 – John Churchill, 1st Duke of Marlborough, English general (d. 1722)
- June 5 – Ogasawara Nagashige, Japanese daimyō (d. 1732)
- June 14 – Carlo Alessandro Guidi, Italian lyric poet (d. 1712)
- June 25 – Joseph Sherman (Massachusetts Bay Colony), American politician (d. 1731)
- July 1 – Maria Anna Vasa, Polish princess (d. 1651)
- July 6 – Frederick Casimir Kettler, Duke of Courland and Semigallia (d. 1698)
- July 25 – William Burkitt, English biblical expositor, vicar in Dedham (d. 1703)
- July 30 – Edward Lewis (Devizes MP), English politician (d. 1674)
- August 7 – Louis Joseph, Duke of Guise (d. 1671)
- August 16 – Vincenzo Coronelli, Franciscan friar, Italian cartographer, encyclopedist (d. 1718)
- August 17 – Jean Gaston, Duke of Valois (d. 1652)
- August 27 – Carl Philipp, Reichsgraf von Wylich und Lottum, Prussian field marshal (d. 1719)
- August 30 – Ludovico Sabbatini, Italian priest (d. 1724)
- September 7 – Juan Manuel María de la Aurora, 8th duke of Escalona, Spanish aristocrat (d. 1725)
- September 20 – Adrian Beverland, Dutch philosopher and jurist who settled in England (d. 1716)
- September 23 – Jeremy Collier, English theatre critic, non-juror bishop and theologian (d. 1726)
- October 9 – René Auguste Constantin de Renneville, French writer (d. 1723)
- October 10
  - Jane Rolfe, granddaughter of Pocahontas (d. 1676)
  - Ulisse Giuseppe Gozzadini, Italian Catholic cardinal (d. 1728)
- October 19 – Charles Erskine, Earl of Mar (d. 1689)
- October 20 – Robert Shirley, 1st Earl Ferrers, English peer and courtier (d. 1717)
- October 21 – Jean Bart, French admiral (d. 1702)
- October 24 – Steven Blankaart, Dutch entomologist (d. 1704)
- November 4 – King William III of England, Scotland, and Ireland (d. 1702)
- November 7 – John Robinson, English diplomat (d. 1723)
- November 17 – Joanna Koerten, Dutch painter (d. 1715)
- November 18 – Robert Walpole (1650–1700), English politician (d. 1700)
- November 19 – Henry, Duke of Saxe-Römhild (d. 1710)
- November 23 – Joseph Oriol, Spanish Catholic priest, saint (d. 1702)
- November 28 – Jan Palfijn, Flemish surgeon and obstetrician (d. 1730)
- November 30 – Domenico Martinelli, Italian architect (d. 1718)
- December 3 – August of Saxe-Weissenfels (1650–1674), Prince of Saxe-Weissenfels and provost of Magdeburg (d. 1674)
- December 6 – Johann Friedrich Mayer (theologian), German Lutheran theologian (d. 1712)
- December 10 – Theophilus Hastings, 7th Earl of Huntingdon (d. 1701)
- December 16
  - Alexander Hermann, Count of Wartensleben, Prussian field marshal (d. 1734)
  - Sir Robert Marsham, 4th Baronet, English politician (d. 1703)
- December 17 – Christoph Arnold, German astronomer (d. 1695)
- December 25 – Claude Aveneau, French missionary (d. 1711)
- date unknown
  - Thomas Savery, English engineer and inventor (d. 1715)
  - Jan Antonín Losy, Czech lutist (d. 1721)

== Deaths ==
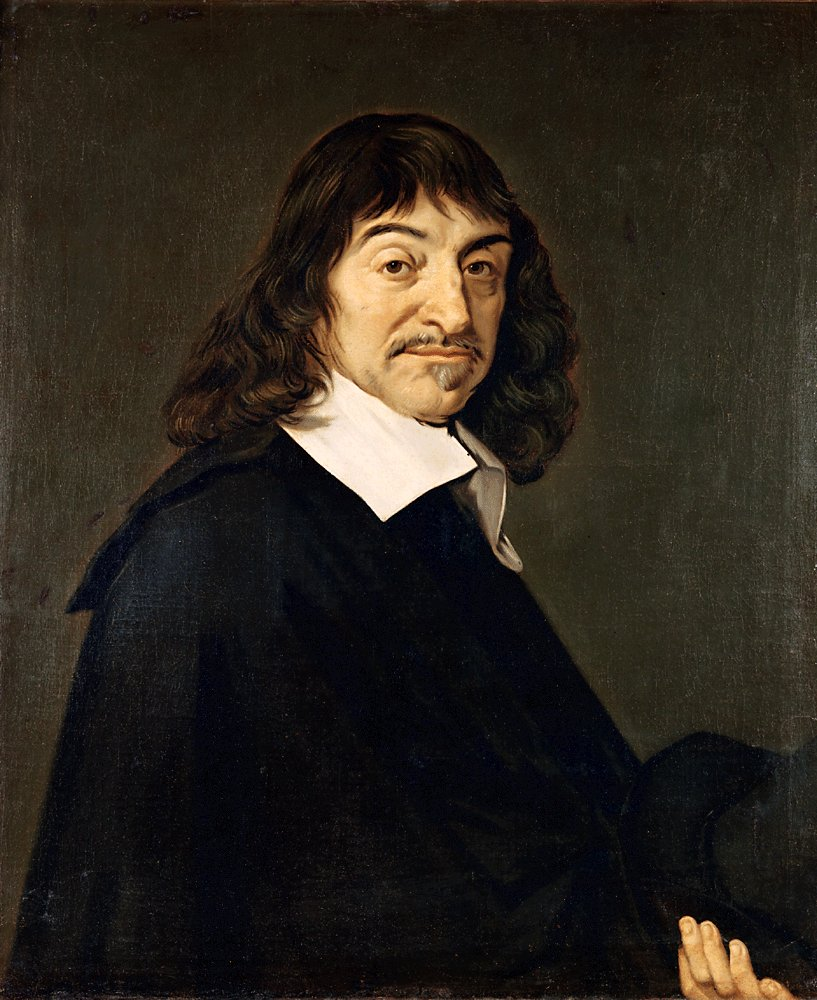
René Descartes

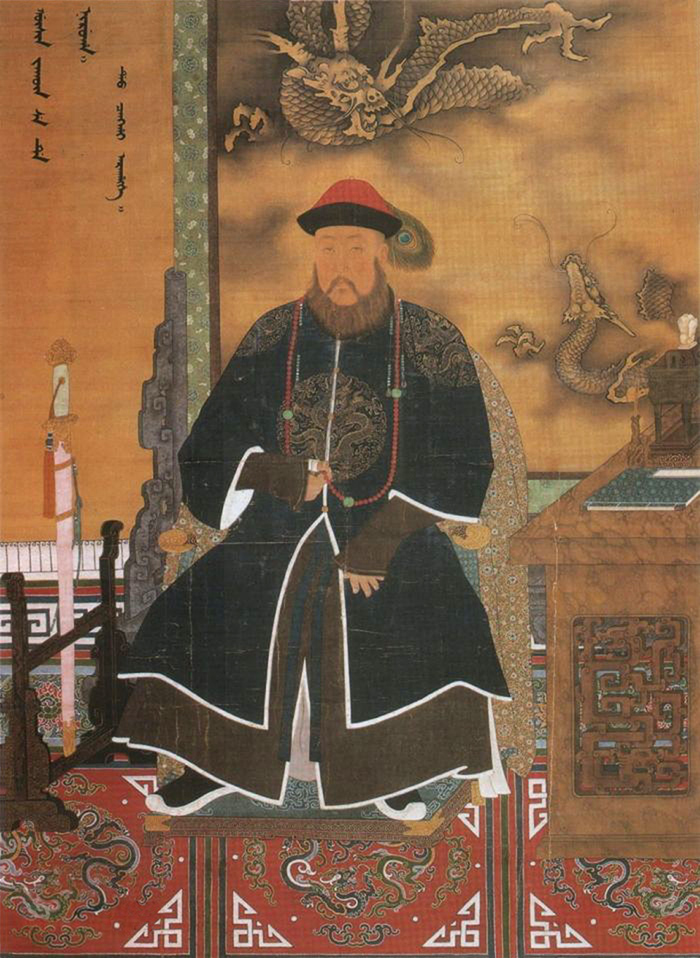
Prince Dorgon

- January 7 – Louis I of Anhalt-Köthen, German prince (b. 1579)
- January 18 – Matteo Rosselli, Italian painter (b. 1578)
- January 23 – Philip Herbert, 4th Earl of Pembroke (b. 1584)
- February 11
  - René Descartes, French philosopher (b. 1596)
  - Adriaen van Gaesbeeck, Dutch painter of genre subjects and portraits (b. 1621)
- February 26 – Claude Favre de Vaugelas, Savoyard grammarian and man of letters (b. 1585)
- March 8 – Antonio Tornielli, Italian Catholic prelate (b. 1579)
- March 11 – John Henderson, 5th of Fordell, Scottish noble (b. 1605)
- March 16 – Sophie Elisabeth of Brandenburg, Duchess consort of Saxe-Altenburg (b. 1616)
- March 25
  - Elisabeth of Brunswick-Wolfenbüttel, Duchess of Saxe-Altenburg (b. 1593)
  - John Williams, Welsh clergyman and political advisor to King James I (b. 1582)
- April 3 – Christian Gueintz, German teacher and writer-grammarian (b. 1592)
- April 18 – Simonds d'Ewes, English antiquarian and politician (b. 1602)
- April 21 – Yagyū Jūbei Mitsuyoshi, Japanese samurai (b. 1607)
- April 22 – Stephanius, Danish historian (b. 1599)
- May 7 – Kanō Naonobu, Japanese painter of the Kanō school of painting (b. 1607)
- May 21 – James Graham, 1st Marquess of Montrose, Scottish royalist (b. 1612)
- May 20 – Francesco Sacrati, Italian composer (b. 1605)
- May 25 – Michel Particelli d'Émery, French politician (b. 1596)
- May 28 – Agnes of Hesse-Kassel, Princess consort of Anhalt-Dessau (b. 1606)
- June 8 – Maximilian von und zu Trauttmansdorff, Austrian diplomat (b. 1584)
- June 18 – Christoph Scheiner, German astronomer (b. 1573 or 1575)
- June 19
  - Matthäus Merian, Swiss engraver (b. 1593)
  - Simon Philip, Count of Lippe-Detmold (1636–1650) (b. 1632)
- June 26 – Hedwig of Brunswick-Wolfenbüttel, Duchess consort of Pomerania (b. 1595)
- June 28 – Jean Rotrou, French poet and tragedian (b. 1609)
- June 30 – Niccolò Cabeo, Italian Jesuit writer, theologian (b. 1586)
- July 2 – Marion Delorme, French courtesan known for her relationships with the important men of her time (b. 1613)
- July 16 – Margaretha van Valckenburch, Dutch shipowner, only female member of the VOC (b. 1565)
- July 18 – Robert Levinz, English Royalist, hanged in London by Parliamentary forces as a spy (b. 1615)
- August – John Parkinson, English herbalist and botanist (b. 1567)
- August 16 – Cesare Monti, Italian cardinal, Archbishop of Milan (b. 1593)
- September 7 – Scévole de Sainte-Marthe, French historian (b. 1571)
- September 8 – Elizabeth Stuart, second daughter of King Charles I of England (b. 1635)
- September 13 – Ferdinand of Bavaria (b. 1577)
- September 14 – Josias von Rantzau, Marshal of France (b. 1609)
- September 24 – Charles de Valois, Duke of Angoulême, son of Charles IX of France (b. 1573)
- October 25 – Franciscus Quaresmius, Italian writer and orientalist (b. 1583)
- October 29 – David Calderwood, Scottish historian (b. 1575)
- November 6 – Prince William II of Orange (b. 1626)
- November 24 – Manuel Cardoso, Portuguese composer (b. 1566)
- December 13 – (bapt.) Phineas Fletcher, English poet (b. 1582)
- December 31 – Dorgon, Manchu prince (b. 1612)
- date unknown – Catalina de Erauso, Spanish-Mexican nun and soldier (b. 1592)
  - Koçi Bey, Ottoman man of letters
  - Magdalena Andersdotter, Norwegian-Faroese shipowner (b. 1590)
  - Teofila Chmielecka, Polish military wife (b. 1590)
