= Potosí Silversmithing School =

Silversmithing school in Bolivia

Coordinates: 19.5865°S 65.7687°W

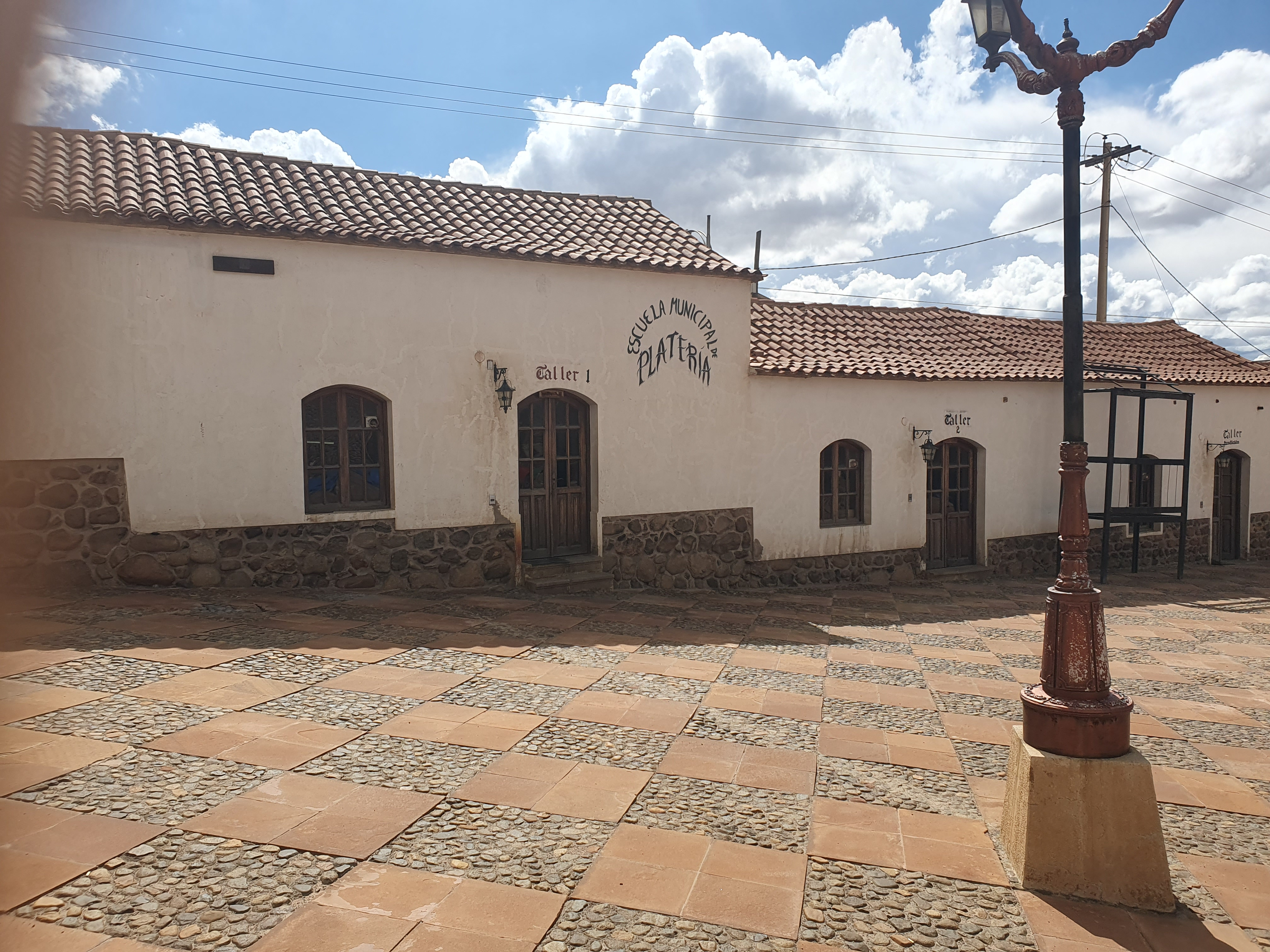
View of Potosí's Silversmithing School

The Potosí Silversmithing School (Spanish: Escuela Municipal de Plateria de Potosí) is a institute in Potosí, Bolivia, that offers courses and training in silversmithing. The school was established in November 2011 by an initiative of the municipal government of Potosí, the mining company Manquiri and the Chamber of Artisans. The school graduated its first chohort in early 2013 in a ceremony attended by vice president Álvaro García Linera. The school is supplied by high-purity silver (99.96%) by Manquiri. Both old and young are admitted as students with 17 years being the minimum age. The school as well as the processing of the making of silver from silver ore are part of a Bolivian industrialization effort.

Administratively, the school is part of the secretariat for economic development of the municipality of Potosí.

== See also ==
- Great Potosí Mint Fraud of 1649
- National Mint of Bolivia
- Cerro Rico
