= Sinai Liberation Day =

Egyptian national holiday

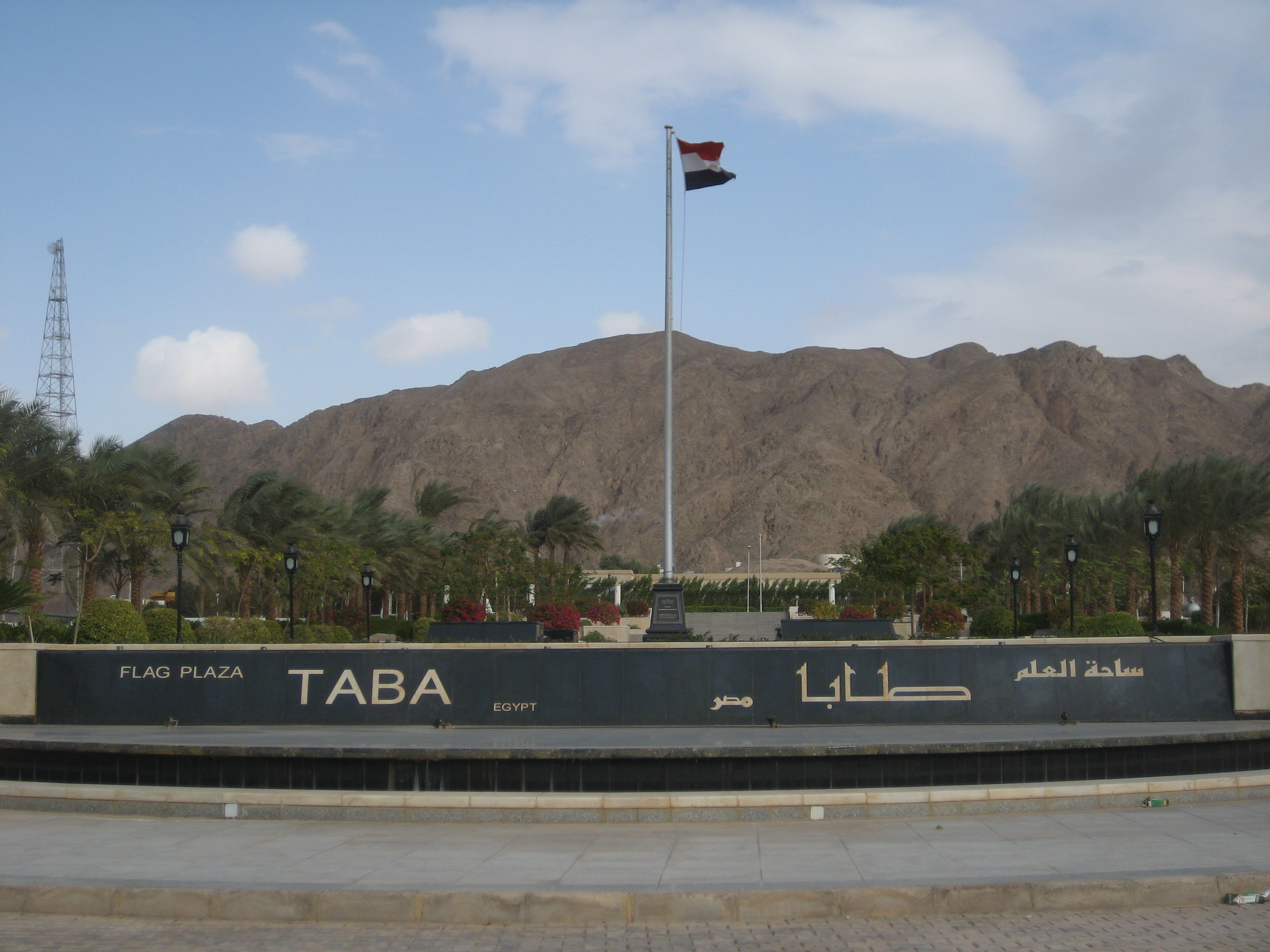
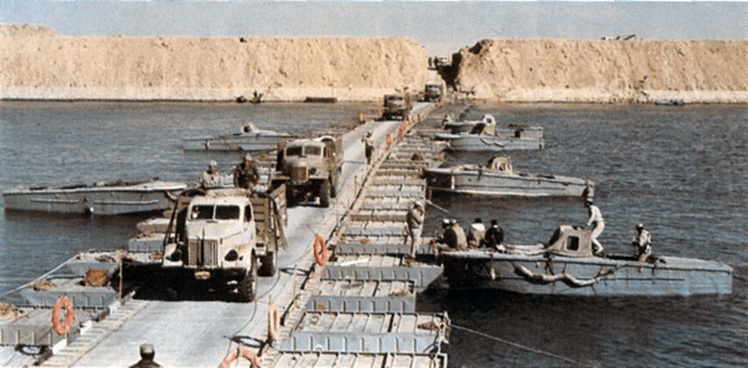
Top: The Egyptian flag raised at the Flag Plaza, Taba, South Sinai, Egypt
Bottom: Egyptian vehicles crossing the Suez Canal toward the Sinai Peninsula on October 7, 1973, during the October War

Sinai Liberation Day is a public holiday in Egypt which celebrates the liberation of the land of Sinai from Israeli occupation back to Egyptian sovereignty. It is the anniversary of the liberation of the peninsula of Sinai corresponding to April 25 of each year, celebrating the day in 1982 when Egypt recovered the land of Sinai and the withdrawal of the last Israeli soldier from the city of Taba in 1988. This came in accordance to the international peace treaty of 1979 and the settlement of the long diplomatic disputes. On this day, Egyptians give tribute to the Egyptian officers and soldiers from the Egyptian armed forces and their sacrifices which led to the recovery of Sinai from occupation. This day is also dedicated for celebrating the beauty of Sinai which hosts many touristic cities like Sharm El Sheikh and Dahab along the Egyptian Red Sea Riviera, being popular destinations for Egyptians and foreign tourists alike.

== See also ==
- Public holidays in Egypt
- October War
- Sinai Peninsula
