= Public holidays in Egypt =

Public holidays are celebrated by the entire population of Egypt. Holidays in Egypt have many classifications. Some holidays are religious and others are secular, while some can be fixed holidays on the calendar while others are movable. There are four Islamic holidays and two Christian holidays. The National Day of Egypt is celebrated on July, 23 which coincides with the annual celebration of the Egyptian revolution of 1952 when the modern republic of Egypt was declared, ending the period of the Kingdom of Egypt.

Government offices and ministries in Egypt rest on Friday of each week. In addition, banks and many institutes have non-working days on Saturday too which is an official resting-day or Sunday which is not official but commonly used as a resting-day by non-governmental institutes and shops with Christian religious observance. Some barbershops and hairdressers close their shops on Monday instead of Friday, Saturday and Sunday when they keep their shops open.

== National holidays ==
The following holidays are celebrated across the country, where government offices and ministries are closed. These holidays are either national secular holidays or important religious holidays.

=== Fixed holidays ===
The following holidays occur annually on a fixed day of the calendar:

Date	English name	Arabic name	Description
January 7	Christmas Day	عيد الميلاد المجيد	Celebrates the birth of Jesus Christ, according to the Coptic calendar (29 Koiak) (It could be classified as movable, as it traditionally follows the Julian rather than the Gregorian calendar)
January 25	Revolution Day 2011; National Police Day	عيد ثورة 25 يناير عيد الشرطة	Celebrates the day of the beginning of the Egyptian revolution of 2011, protesting the 29-year rule of Hosni Mubarak. Celebrates the anniversary of Police officers' resistance against the British Army in 1952 during the final months of the Kingdom of Egypt.
April 25	Sinai Liberation Day	عيد تحرير سيناء	Celebrates the final withdrawal of all Israeli military forces from the Sinai Peninsula in 1982.
May 1	Labour Day	عيد العمال	
June 30	30 June Day	عيد ثورة 30 يونيو	Observes the June 2013 Egyptian protests, which saw President Mohamed Morsi deposed by the military a few days later.
July 23	Revolution Day	عيد ثورة 23 يوليو	Celebrates the Egyptian Revolution of 1952 which led to the declaration of the modern republic of Egypt. This is considered the National Day of Egypt.
October 6	Armed Forces Day	عيد القوات المسلحة	Celebrates Egypt's military forces. The date is based on Egypt and Syria's invasion of Israel in the Yom Kippur War, which eventually led to the return of the Sinai Peninsula from Israeli occupation back to Egyptian sovereignty.

Some government-related offices, including most universities, are also closed on the Coptic Orthodox date of Epiphany, 19 January.

=== Movable holidays ===
The following days are public holidays but the date on which each occurs varies, either because the date is fixed relative to the lunar Islamic calendar or (in the case of Sham El Nessim) has no fixed date in any calendar. In order in which they occur:

Date	English name	Arabic name	Description
April or May	Sham El Nessim (Spring Festival)	شم النسيم	The Monday following Orthodox Easter
1 Muharram	Islamic New Year	عيد رأس السنة الهجرية	The first day of the year based on the lunar Islamic calendar (1 Muharram)
12 Rabi' al-Awwal	Prophet Muhammad's Birthday	المولد النبوي الشريف	The birthday of Muhammad, according to the Sunni account (12 Rabi al-Awwal)
1–3 Shawwal	Eid al-Fitr	عيد الفطر المبارك	Breaking of the fast of Ramadan, for three days (1-3 Shawwal)
10–13 Zul-Higga	Eid al-Adha	عيد الأضحى المبارك	End of the Hajj and commemoration of the Sacrifice of Abraham, for four days (10-13 Dhu al-Hijjah)
