= National Mint of Bolivia =

Coordinates: 19°35′19″S 65°45′15″W

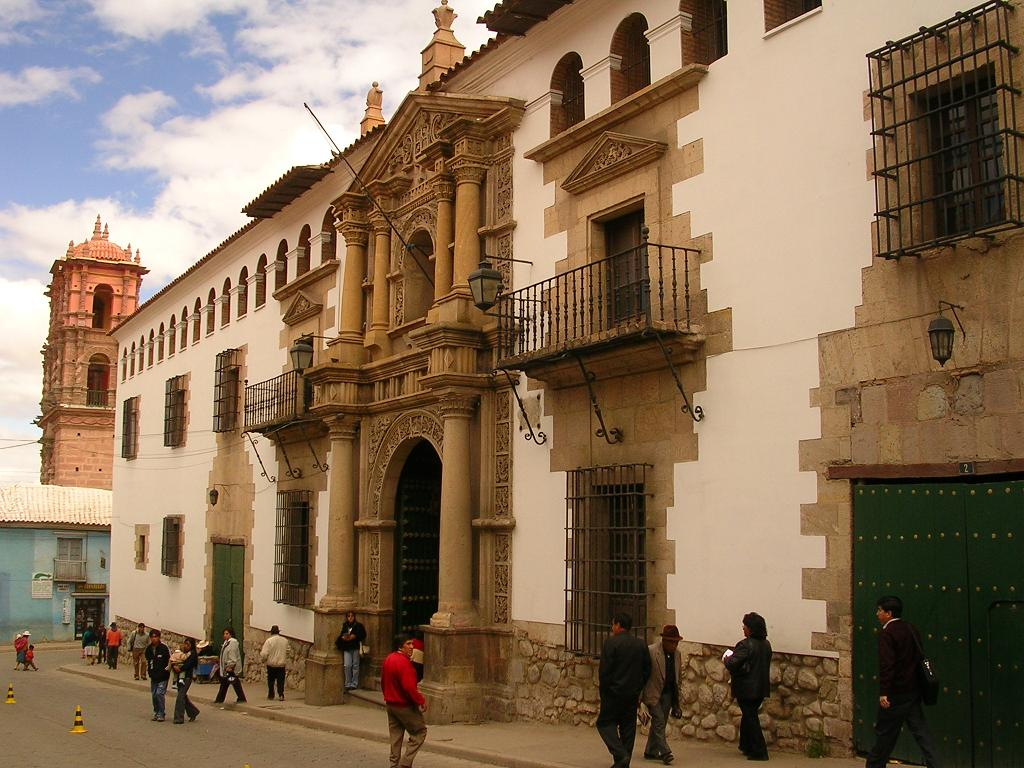
- Façade of the Mint, February 2007
- Interactive map of the National Mint of Bolivia area

General information
- Location: Potosí, Bolivia
- Opened: 1572

Design and construction
- Architect: Jerónimo Leto

The National Mint of Bolivia (Spanish: Casa de la Moneda de Bolivia) or the Mint of Potosí (in colonial era) is a former mint located in the city of Potosí in Bolivia. It was from the mint of Potosí that most of the silver shipped through the Spanish Main came, in the form of coins denominating the Spanish dollar, which became world's major international currency during the reign of the Spanish Empire. The current-day facility is a museum, on the site of the colonial mint's second location, which operated from 1773 to 1951.

The coinage minted during its period became so well known in the world that a saying, memorialized by Miguel de Cervantes, came into use: valer un potosí, "to be worth a potosí" (that is, "a fortune").

== First mint ==
Silver mining at Cerro Rico (a mountain of silver ore), a growth of population and a commercial expansion coupled with Potosí's notable height, prompted a necessity to organise a coinage centre. Minting began immediately on the basis of a rudimentary technology that remained for the next 212 years, from 1572 to 1767.

A proposal by the Spanish viceroy Francisco de Toledo, Count of Oropesa set about the initial construction of the first mint. In 1572 the foundations near the Royal Palaces in the Plaza del Regozijo (now Plaza 10 de Noviembre) under the auspices of the architect Jerónimo Leto, who finished the work in three years. The overall costs exceeded 8,000 pesos, the equivalent of around ten million dollars in today's currency. Charles III of Spain is said to have remarked on hearing the cost of the mint, "the whole building must be made of pure silver".

== Second mint ==
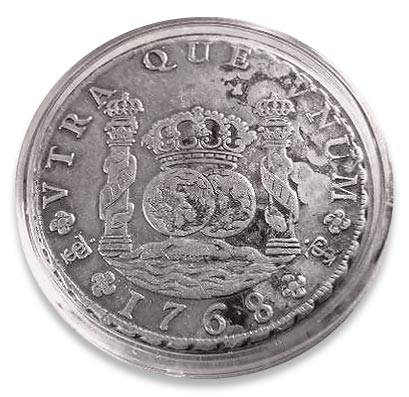
A coin struck in the Mint of Potosí in 1768.

Following a scandal and the resulting investigation, plans to reform the old factory were abandoned and a new building was erected in the neighbouring plaza del Gato. The scandal reflected ongoing challenges at the Potosí mint, including incidents such as the Great Potosi Mint Fraud of 1649, in which officials tampered with coin weight and silver content, undermining the integrity of the currency and prompting stricter oversight from Spanish colonial authorities. These events highlighted the need for improved quality control and technological innovation in coin production.

The new factory saw its construction begin in 1757 and finish in 1770 amongst a number of difficulties. Hammered coinage, the technique whereby coins were produced by placing a blank piece of metal of the correct weight between two dies, and then striking the upper die with a hammer to produce the required image on both sides, which had been used since the first coins at Potosí continued at the old factory until 1773. Nevertheless, the first screw-press coins were produced in 1767 as used as such until 1869 when moveable steam presses were installed.

Dennis O. Flynn and Arturo Giráldez have argued that "the singular product most responsible for the birth of world trade was silver." They also estimate that "Spanish America was the source of approximately 150,000 tons of silver between 1500 and 1800, comprising perhaps 80 percent of world production." Silver from the Potosí mint, including that produced at the second mint, circulated widely across Europe, the Americas, and Asia through trade networks such as the Manila Galleon route.

Alejandra Irigoin notes that the breakdown of the Spanish Peso standard in the early 19th century disrupted these networks. Markets that had relied on Spanish American silver, particularly in China and parts of Asia faced declines in coin quality and reliability. According to Irigoin, the "implosion of the Spanish Empire after 1808 led to fragmentation of a previously unified monetary regime, resulting in production of coins of divergent quality, fineness, and weight." The mint's large-scale production contributed to the development of early modern global trade and finance, linking the Americas to markets across multiple continents and demonstrating the central role of colonial silver in the emergence of world commerce.

The modern day Casa de la Moneda museum is at the site of the second mint.

== Later years and Republican minting ==
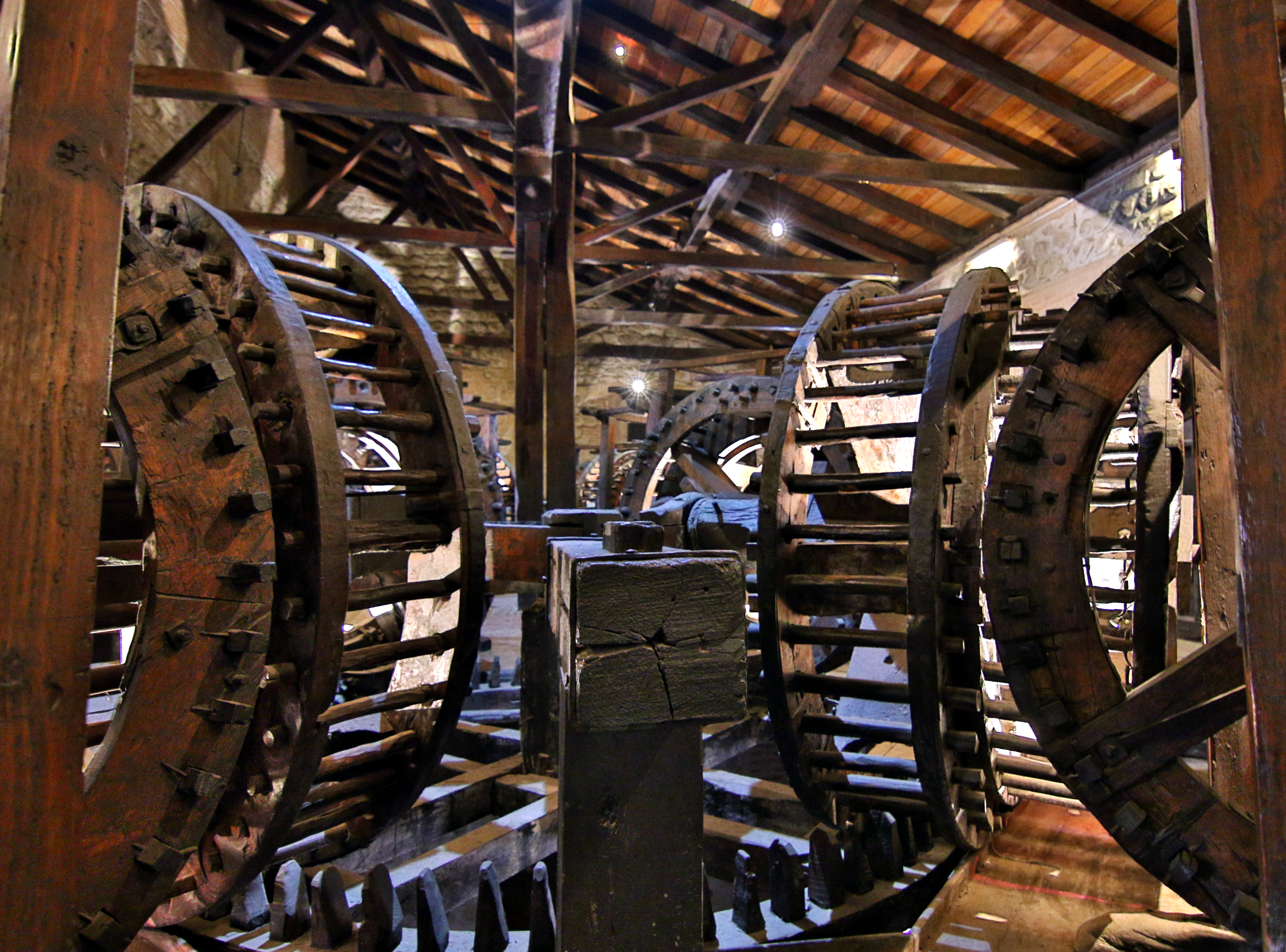
Geartrain within the National Mint of Bolivia.

The revolutionary authorities of the United Provinces of the Río de la Plata taking over the Casa de Moneda by General Manuel Belgrano in 1813. Days before -in Buenos Aires- the Assembly of the Year XIII created a national currency for the United Provinces of the Río de la Plata, which had been approved on April 13, 1813.

The Potosí Mint minted gold coins with values of 8, 4, 2 and 1 escudos, and silver coins with 8, 4, 2, 1 and ½ reales. These coins, instead of having the face of the King of Spain, began to carry the legend "In Union and Liberty". On the obverse appeared a radiant Sun of May with eyes, nose, mouth and 32 rays, while the coat of arms of Argentina appeared on the reverse. The legend indicated United Provinces of the Río de la Plata and had the PTS monogram identifying the Potosí mint. In 1815, the stamps were taken from Potosí to Córdoba, where the first mint in Argentina was installed.

The Republic of Bolivia was formed on the 6 August 1825. Little after a conflict that stretched 15 years with the support of Simón Bolívar and Antonio José de Sucre, the administrative organization and monetary unit was established, albeit with numerous difficulties. Two years would have to pass, whilst Spanish currencies continued circulating, before the first Republican coin would be struck.

In 1933 the abandoned Mint was used as a headquarters during the Chaco War was fought between Bolivia and Paraguay over control of a great part of the Gran Chaco region of South America. It was subsequently used as a stable for the peasants who traveled to the Potosí market from the countryside.

The post-independence facility, at the site of the second colonial mint, produced its last coin in 1951, and is now a museum. It is considered one of the most important museums in Bolivia. The building has UNESCO World Heritage status under the City of Potosi listing in 1987.

== See also ==
- Great Potosi Mint Fraud of 1649
- Potosí Silversmithing School
