= National Police Day (Egypt) =

Public holiday in Egypt

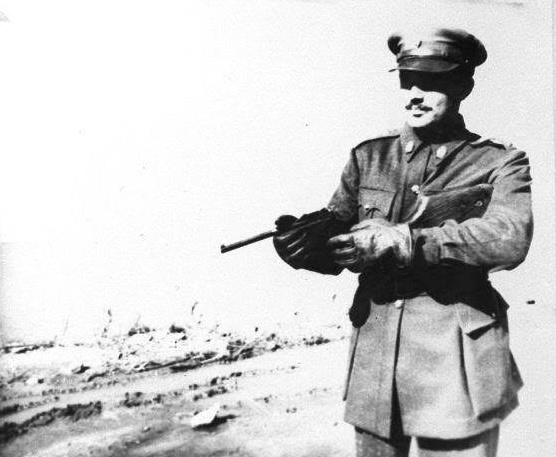
- Salah Zulfikar in 1952, who participated in the Battle of Ismailia
- Significance: Battle of Ismailia
- Date: 25 January
- Next time: 25 January 2027
- Frequency: Annual

National Police Day is a national holiday in Egypt that occurs each year on 25 January.

The holiday commemorates and is a remembrance of the Battle of Ismailia where 50 police officers were killed and more wounded when they refused British demands to hand over weapons and evacuate the Ismaïlia Police Station on 25 January 1952. The British Army surrounded the police station, then brought tanks in and took over the station. One of the major heroes of this battle was Captain Salah Zulfikar. The event was photographed by a local man and photos were published, inciting anger and riots throughout Egypt.

January 25 was declared as an official holiday in 2009 by Egyptian President Hosni Mubarak to recognize the efforts of Egyptian police to maintain security and stability in Egypt and acknowledge their sacrifices.

When the Egyptian police drifted away from their duty of keeping civilians and country safe and began humiliating people to back Mubarak's corrupt regime, a number of Egyptian opposition groups had chosen this day to start mass protests in 2011, which turned into a massive popular revolution which swept across the country on January 28. This revolution is known as the Revolution of 25 January. President Hosni Mubarak stepped down from office, and the Supreme Council of the armed forces took over the governing of the country.

== See also ==
- 2011 Egyptian revolution
- Law enforcement in Egypt
- Public holidays in Egypt
