= Joseph Sherman (Massachusetts Bay Colony) =

American politician (1650–1731)

Joseph Sherman (June 25, 1650 - January 20, 1731) was born at Watertown, Massachusetts Bay Colony. He married on November 16, 1673, at Watertown, Elizabeth Winship, daughter of Lt. Edward Winship and Elizabeth Parke. She was born April 25, 1652, in Cambridge, Massachusetts Bay Colony. He was said to have been a blacksmith.

From 1675 to 1676 he served as a corporal in King Philip's War under Captains Poole and Brattle. From 1682 to 1684 he was a Constable and in 1685 and 1686 a tythingman. He was also a "hogrif and Fence Viewer" in 1692 and 1697, and an assessor in 1695. He was a surveyor in 1700 and 1701, and then elected seven times as a Watertown selectman between 1700 and 1712. From 1702 to 1705, he was also made a representative to the General Court in Boston, Massachusetts Bay Colony.

He was the grandfather of American founding father Roger Sherman.
