= Battle of Ismailia (1952) =

Armed confrontation between the British army and Egyptian police in Ismailia, Egypt

- Part of the decolonisation of Africa and Suez Emergency
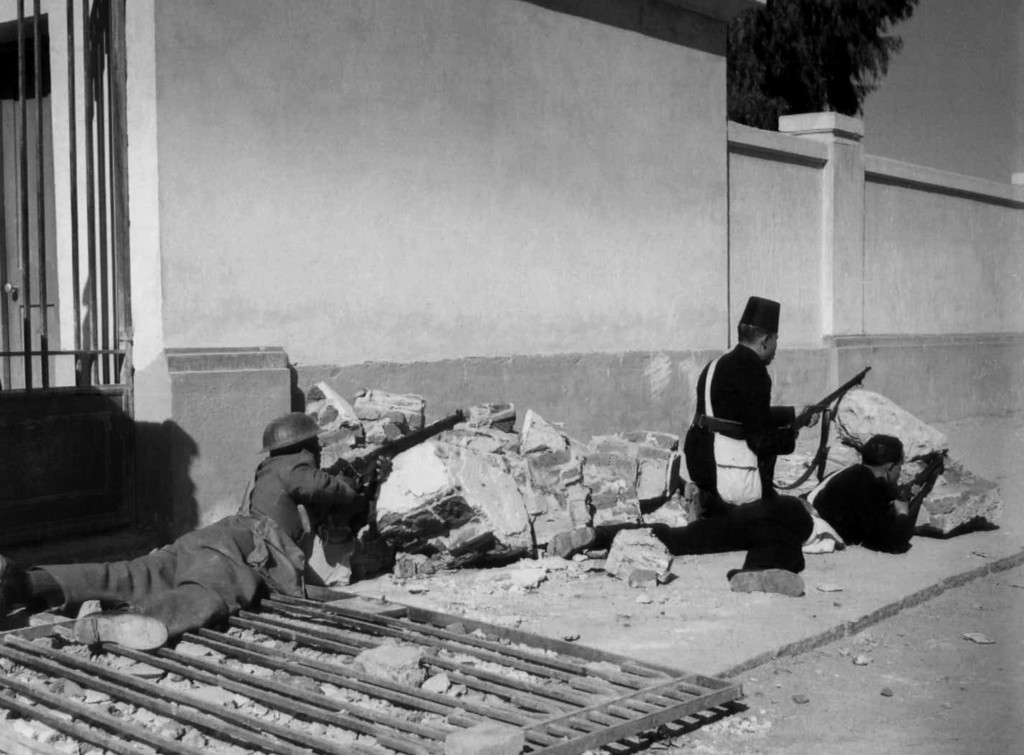
- Egyptian forces during the engagement
Date	25 January 1952
Location	Ismailia, Kingdom of Egypt
Result	British victory: Cairo fire; Attacks on British soldiers by Egyptian guerrillas in the Suez Canal Zone increase and get more violent; Egyptian Revolution of 1952

Belligerents
United Kingdom	Egypt

Commanders and leaders
George Erskine (United Kingdom) Kenneth Exham	Fouad Serageddin; Ahmed Raef; Salah Zulfikar; Mostafa Refaat

Strength
7,000 soldiers 6 tanks	880 policemen

Casualties and losses
13 killed 22 wounded 33 killed (fedayeen attacks)	56 killed 73 wounded

The Battle of Ismailia was an armed confrontation which took place in the Egyptian city of Ismailia on 25 January 1952 between the British Army and Egyptian police. After British forces led by George Erskine tracked a group of fedayeen to a government building in Ismailia, the policemen inside refused to accede to British demands to come outside, surrender their weapons and evacuate the region. When the building's occupants shot and killed a British negotiator, Erskine ordered his troops to attack and capture the building.

In the ensuing confrontation, which took place over two hours, the British captured the building after suffering 13 killed and 22 wounded. 56 Egyptian policemen were killed and 73 wounded, and when news of the engagement was publicized the next day it sparked the Cairo fire and eventually led to the 1952 Egyptian revolution. The British had suffered 33 killed from fedayeen attacks before the incident.

== Background ==
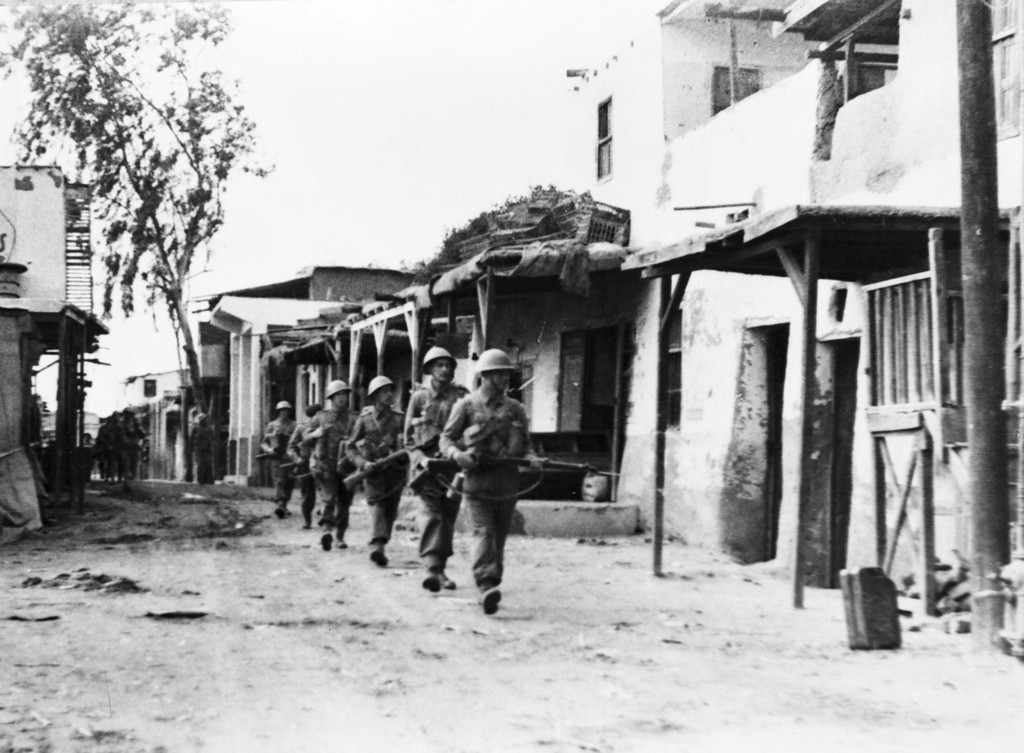
British troops searching for fedayeen in Ismalia on 19 January 1952 after an outbreak of violence in the area.

Beginning in 1882, the British Empire initiated an occupation of Egypt after the Anglo-Egyptian War broke out. The 1919 Egyptian revolution led to the British recognition of Egypt's independence in 1922 as the Kingdom of Egypt, though Britain retained de facto control over the region. After World War II, the British occupation zone had shrunk to the area around the Suez Canal. Beginning in the 1950s, Egyptian nationalists opposed to the occupation organized themselves into guerrilla groups known as fedayeen and launched attacks on British forces in Egypt.

Fedayeen attacks, which consisted of irregular warfare such as sabotage and raids, resulted in 33 British servicemembers being killed and 69 wounded and led to a sharp breakdown in Egypt–United Kingdom relations. These attacks, though not officially supported by the government of Egypt, were highly popular among the Egyptian public; when Egyptian authorities established offices to register the names of workers who wished to resign from their jobs and "contribute to the national struggle", 91,572 Egyptians registered their names in the period from 16 October 1951 to 30 November 1951. Local contractors around the Canal Zone (the British term for their area of occupation in Egypt) also ceased to supply provisions to British forces in Egypt, then numbering in 80,000 strong, in solidarity with the fedayeen.

The city of Ismailia, which was in the Canal Zone and thus under British control, was host to the headquarters of the British military and thus a target for fedayeen attacks. Egyptian security forces in the area were supportive of the fedayeen and provided them with equipment, training and supplies, which the British were aware of. In late 1951 and early 1952, British troops had carried out numerous anti-fedayeen operations around the Canal Zone, including one in Ismailia on 19 January 1952 in response to an outbreak of violence which saw fedayeen guerrillas kill two British soldiers and a nun and wound nine soldiers.

== Battle ==
On 25 January, a British force led by General George Erskine and consisting of 7,000 soldiers and 6 Centurion tanks surrounded an Egyptian government building (which contained a barracks) in Ismailia. The British had followed a group of fedayeen that had fled into the building; the occupants, 880 Egyptian auxiliary policemen, had allowed them to take shelter. Erskine arranged for a negotiator who spoke Arabic to communicate to the occupants of the building that they were to hand over their weapons, evacuate the building and leave the area completely or face an attack. The policemen rebuffed Erskine's demands and contacted Egyptian Minister of the Interior, Fouad Serageddin, who communicated back that he approved their actions and told them to stand firm and not surrender under any circumstances.

After a shot fired from inside the building killed the British negotiator, Erskine ordered his troops, which included the Lancashire Fusiliers, to attack the building. Though the Egyptian policemen were greatly outmatched, being equipped solely with firearms compared to the British, who had tanks, field guns and armoured fighting vehicles, they continued to resist for over an hour. The British eventually managed to capture the building after two hours of fighting, when the Egyptians ran out of ammunition. Captain Salah Zulfikar was a major key figure who volunteered in the battle. Both sides had suffered minor casualties: the British suffered 13 soldiers killed and 22 wounded, while the policemen had more substantial losses- 56 killed and 73 wounded. All policemen who survived the engagement were taken captive by British forces.

== Aftermath ==
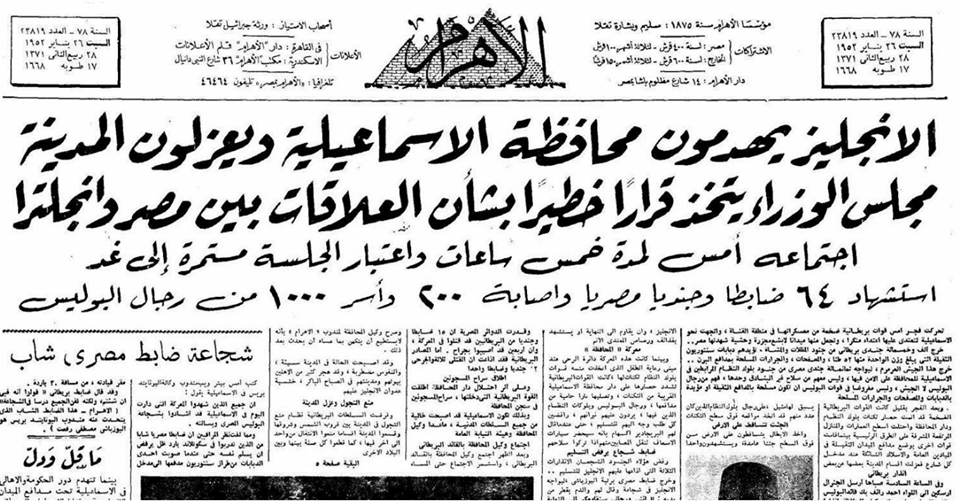
Egyptian newspaper Al-Ahram reporting on the battle

On the morning of Saturday, 26 January 1952, the news of the incident spread throughout Egypt, and the Egyptians received this news with anger and discontent, and massive demonstrations took place in Cairo, and police and soldiers participated with university students in their demonstrations, and demonstrations broke out in the streets of Cairo, which were filled with angry masses. This angry atmosphere caused the Cairo fire, and further caused the deterioration of King Farouk's popularity to the highest level, which paved the way for the officers to launch the 23 July Movement led by Major General Mohamed Naguib in the same year.

The spontaneous anti-British protests that followed the battle were quickly seized upon by organized elements in the crowd, who burned and ransacked large sectors of Cairo amidst the unexplained absence of Egyptian security forces. The fire is thought by some to have signalled the end of the Kingdom of Egypt. The perpetrators of the Cairo Fire remain unknown to this day, and the truth about this important event in modern Egyptian history has yet to be established. The disorder that befell Cairo during the 1952 fire has been compared to the chaos that followed the anti-government protests of 25 January 2011, which saw demonstrations take place amidst massive arson and looting, an inexplicable withdrawal of the police, and organized prison-breaking.

25 January turned into the National Police Day that is celebrated every year. It also became a national holiday for Ismailia Governorate, and in 2009 January 25 of each year became an official holiday in Egypt.

== Gallery ==
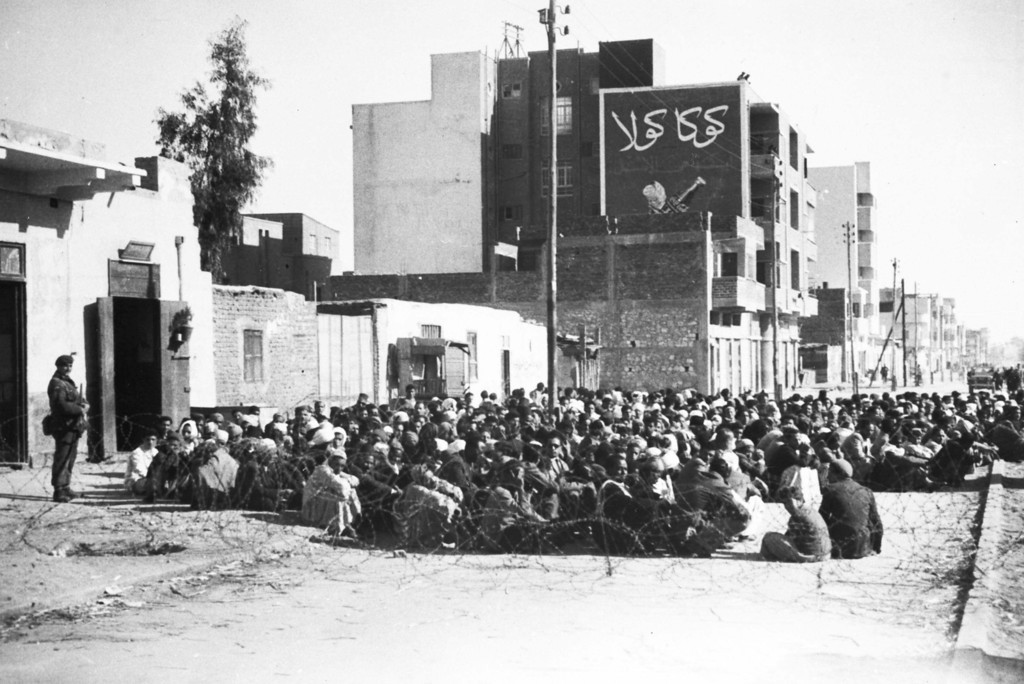

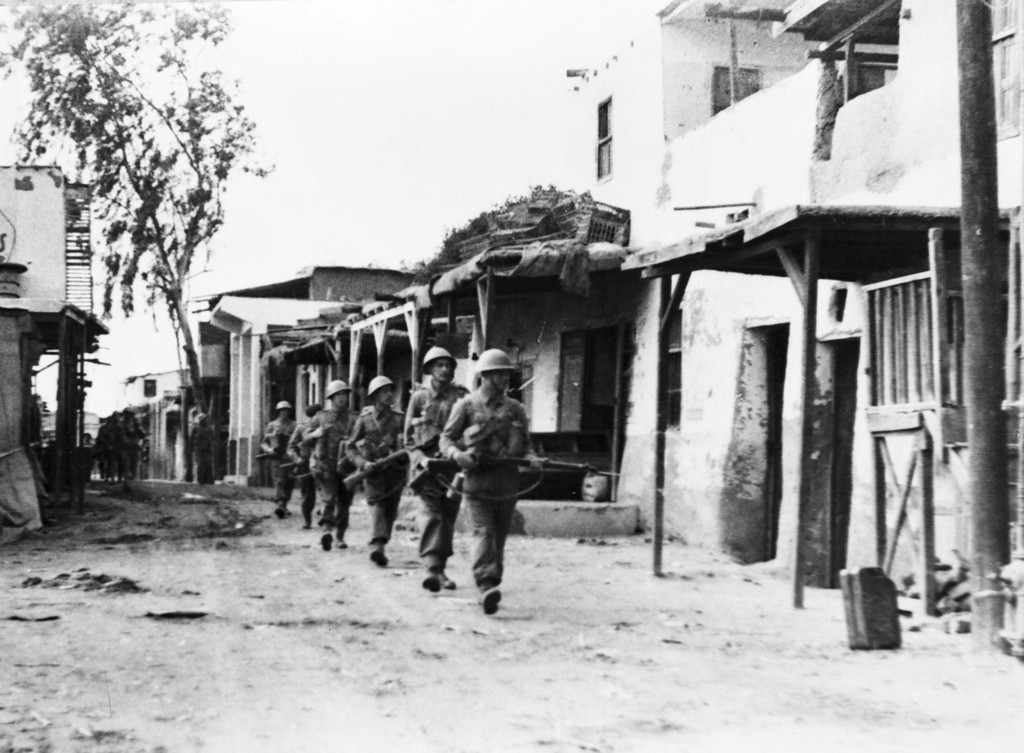

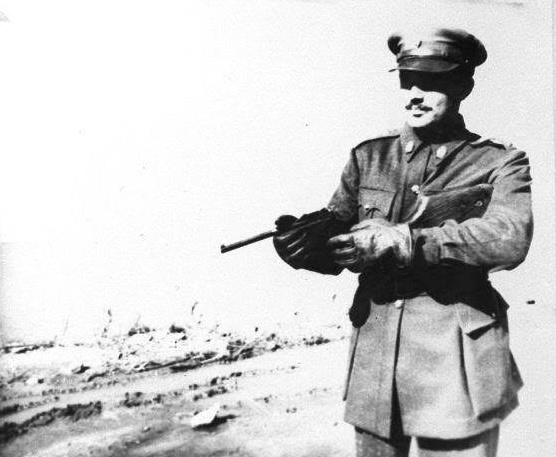

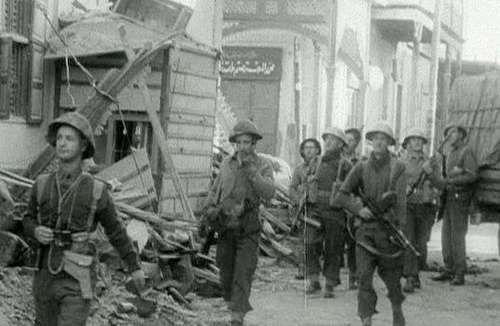

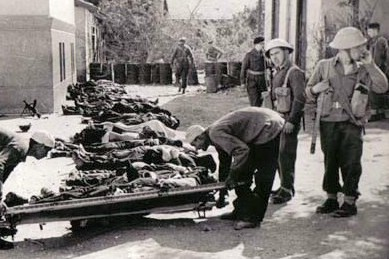

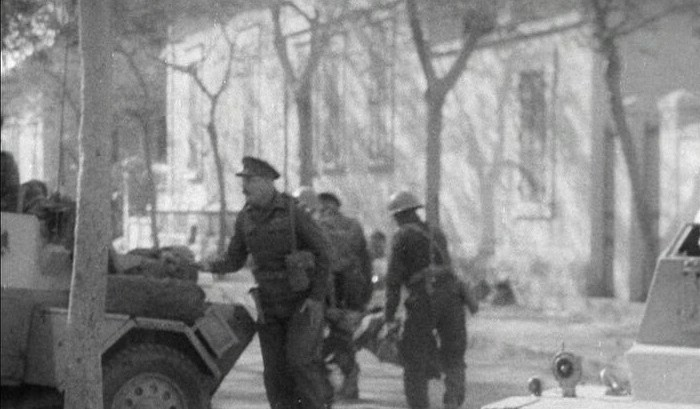

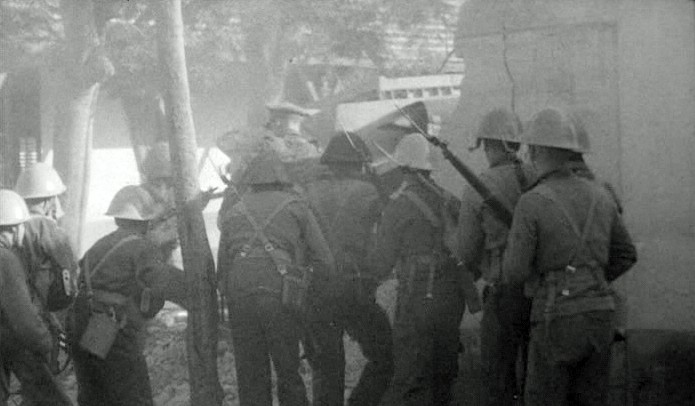

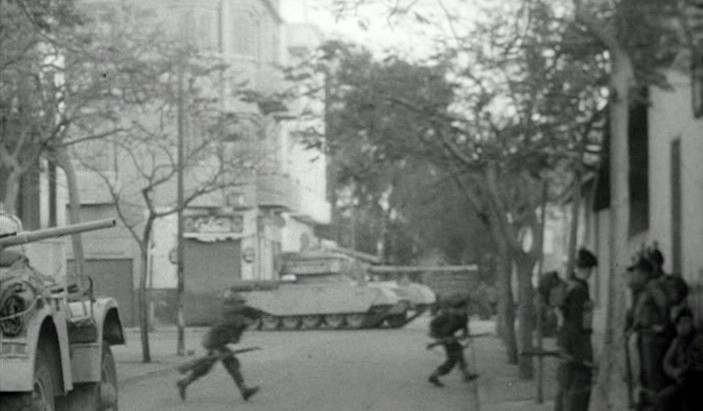
