= Francisco Gómez de la Rocha =

Francisco Gómez de la Rocha was a corregidor of Potosí (d. January 26, 1650). Through the 1640s he led a widespread debasement fraud in conjunction with local silver merchants. On January 25, 1650 he was executed for his involvement in the Great Potosí Mint Fraud of 1649 Francisco Gómez de la Rocha, a rich former corregidor of Potosí is executed.
