= Great Potosí Mint Fraud of 1649 =

Spanish monetary scandal

The Great Potosí Mint Fraud of 1649 was a financial fraud involving the fineness of silver coinage that began in Potosí, Spanish Viceroyalty of Peru, now Bolivia. The scandal had worldwide effects that lasted for decades.

== Background ==
Potosí was founded in 1545 as a mining town near Cerro Rico, a mountain that contained enormous quantities of silver ore. By 1570, a new process using mercury amalgamation was developed that allowed the silver ores of the mountain to be profitably exploited using forced labor in hazardous conditions. In 1572, the first mint of Potosí was constructed to process the smelted silver into real coins, which were then shipped to Arica on the western coast of South America and from there to the Spanish Main and points around the world. By the early 17th century, Potosí had a population of 160,000. The minted coins were to have a silver content of 93 parts per 100, as decreed by King Philip IV of Spain in December 1642.

== Scandal ==
Rumors of the fineness of the silver coins from Potosí began to circulate in the early 17th century. Slave owners and mint officials blamed the mint slaves for the reduced fineness of coins minted at Potosí. Complaints from the Kingdom of Aragon and the Kingdom of Castile in 1648 asserted the coins to be worth as little as 5 reales instead of 8 reales. Royal trials confirmed the coins from Potosí contained only 75% of the silver they were supposed to contain. In response to this, King Philip sent Francisco de Nestares Marín, a former inquisitor, to investigate the situation. He began his investigation at the end of 1648.

Marín's investigation revealed that the fraud permeated the entire silver operation. Key figures in the fraud were Francisco Gómez de la Rocha, a rich former corregidor of Potosí, and Juan Ramírez de Arellano, an assayer at the mint. Both of them were executed for their crimes, and other assayers at the mint were fined or removed from their positions. The corregidor of Potosí was removed from his position and imprisoned. Several silver merchants were also executed.

Marín named Juan Rodríguez de Rodas as the head assayer of the mint, a purpose for which he had been sent from Spain. Coins minted under Rodas were known as rodases, while the debased coins were referred to as rochunas. However the new coins, though better, were still short of the required fineness.

== Impact and aftermath ==
The scandal had a large impact on Habsburg Spain, causing a global panic with effects reaching as far as Southeast Asia. Spanish war efforts of the time were impacted. Trade was significantly affected, and while decisions were being made about what to do with the suspect currency, people held onto their Potosí-origin coins. With mistrust of the currency, trade was paralyzed in some places, consumer product availability reduced, and prices increased. Spanish currency in Europe was discredited. In October 1650 King Philip ordered that 8- and 4-real coins were to be devalued. This affected all coins from the Potosí mint that were in circulation, whether they were of appropriate fineness or not. For this purpose, he gave García Sarmiento de Sotomayor, the Viceroy of Peru, discretion to implement the mandate as he saw fit. In January 1652, Sotomayor decreed that the rochunas coins would be devalued to 6 reales and submitted for melting. The new 8-real rodases would be worth 7.5 reales, and the 4-real rodases would be worth 3.75 reales. The lower denominations of coins were unchanged. As part of the decision, the new rodases had to be countermarked to indicate their worth. Some of the older rochunas coins were fraudulently countermarked to indicate they were worth 7.5 reales, which further debased trust in the rodas coins. New, replacement coins with new marks began production in March 1652 with a value of 8 reales. These new coins replaced the rochunas and rodas in circulation, which were subsequently declared illegal for trade in 1657.

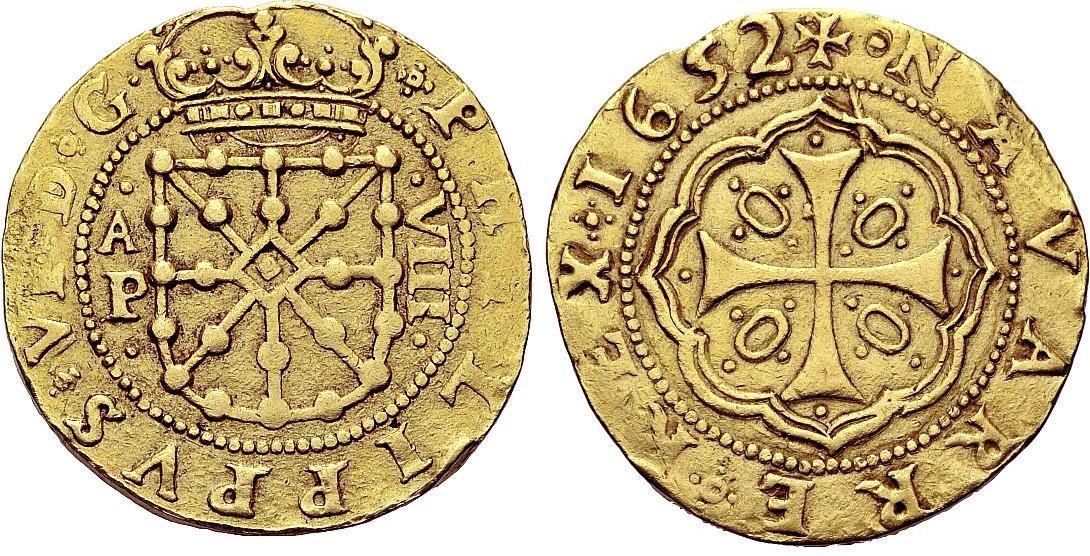
1652 8-escudos gold piece addressing the king as Philip VI of Navarre

The reissue forced the reactivation of mints also in the European part of the empire. In Pamplona, Kingdom of Navarre, silver and gold coins were produced between 1651 and 1652. However the legend Philippus Dei Gratia Castelle et Navarrae rex ("Philip king of Castile and Navarre by the grace of God") offended the Cortes of Navarre, zealous of their charter, and the king had to issue corrected coins with no mention of Castile and his ordinal as Philip VI corresponding to the list of Navarrese monarchs.
