= Alejandro Obregón =

Colombian artist (1920–1992)

- Photographed by Guillermo Angulo.
- Born: Alejandro Jesús Obregón Roses; 4 June 1920; Barcelona, Catalonia, Spain
- Died: 11 April 1992 (aged 71); Cartagena, Bolívar, Colombia
- Known for: Painting
- Notable work: Violencia; Estudiante muerto; Velorio; Amanecer en los Andes
- Movement: Abstract, Surrealism, Cubism
- Spouses: Ilva Rasch-Isla Rodriguez; Freda Sargent; Sonia Osorio Saint-Malo

Alejandro Jesús Obregón Rosės (4 June 1920 – 11 April 1992) was a Colombian painter, muralist, sculptor and engraver.

== Biography ==
Obregón was born in Barcelona, Spain. He was the son of a Colombian father and a Catalan mother. The Obregón family owned a textile factory in Barranquilla, Colombia. Most of his childhood was spent in Barranquilla and Liverpool, England. After returning to Barranquilla, he decided to become an artist. He studied fine arts in Boston for a year in 1939, then returned to Barcelona to serve as Vice-consul of Colombia for four years. He married Ilva Rasch-Isla, the daughter of poet Miguel Rasch-Isla, during his time in Spain. In 1948, he became Director of the School of Fine Arts in Santafé de Bogotá, where he was influenced by the fresco style of artists Pedro Nel Gómez and Santiago Martinez Delgado. He left the School of Fine Arts and moved to France with his second wife, Sonia Osorio; he later married his third wife, English painter Freda Sargent. After traveling around Europe, he returned to Barranquilla in 1955. Obregón died on April 11, 1992, succumbing to a brain tumor. He lived and worked in Cartagena for the last 22 years of his life, from 1970 until his death in 1992.

=== Career ===
Obregón presented his first solo exhibition in Colombia in 1945. He participated in the fifth and sixth Salón de Artistas Colombianos in 1944 and 1945, which attracted attention from press and critics. In 1945, Obregón settled in Barranquilla where he won the first prize for Dorso de mujer at the first Salón Anual de Artistas Costeños and showed his second solo exhibition in February 1946. During the same year, he moved to Paris and exhibited work throughout France, Germany and Switzerland. Then he moved to Alba, near Avignon, where he remained until 1955. In 1955, Souvenir of Venice (1954) was acquired for the Museum of Modern Art New York, making Obregón one of the few Colombians in the museum's collection. He won the Salón de Artistas Colombianos Prize in 1962.

== Style and elements ==
Obregón was primarily a painter. His compositions are usually divided horizontally into two areas; style was characterized by use of color and impasto. Landscapes were translated into geometric symbols of Colombia. Obregón is an example of the abstract Surrealist trend in Latin America.

Critic Marta Traba identified a series of characteristic elements in Obregon's work: personal poetic values; self-sufficiency in regard to freedom of form; search for identity based on the landscape, zoology, and flora; elliptic space people by magic elements; and contempt for urban culture. Obregon made extensive use of his personal imagination and vitality.

== Periods ==
Between 1942 and 1946, Obregón assimilated different influences. His painting shows the influence of Picasso and Graham Sutherland, although these are only points of departure. Between 1947 and 1957, influenced by Goya and Picasso, he painted themes such as lunatic asylums, madmen in cafes, and dogs. He was witness to the popular revolt of April 9, 1948, and became especially interested in interpreting that event, which would reach its maximum expression in his oil Violencia. In his third period, from 1958 to 1965, Obregón made another trip to Europe and the United States. During the 1960s, Obregón used a pictographic system of his own invention, with formal and chromatic symbols. This system was recognized at the Ninth São Paulo Biennial, where he represented Colombia in his own pavilion and was awarded the Francisco Matarazzo Sobrinho Grand Prize for Latin America. After 1966, once he earned wide recognition at home and abroad, he switched from oils to acrylic.

== Influences ==
Obregón took influence from European culture, while retaining an Andean imagery and stylistic creation, using guitars, bulls, and the Andean condor in his pieces. In 1959, Obregón painted his first condor, which has since appeared in almost fifty canvases during his career. While alluding to the nation, as the condor figures in Colombia's coat of arms, in Obregón's work, the condor also refers to the exaltation of the might of American nature, the ideal of liberty, and the power of vitality. The use of guitar iconography may have come from the influence of Picasso, whose Cubist influence was the starting point for Obregón's artwork.

At different times throughout his career, Obregón produced works related to political violence in Colombia, such as La Violencia, since 1948. Estudiante Muerto, awarded the national prize for Colombia at the 1956 Guggenheim International Exhibition, belonged to a group of paintings commemorating students and popular leaders who lost their lives during this period of social unrest.

== La Violencia works ==
Velorio (Wake), also known as Estudiante fusilado (Executed Student) and other similar names, was one of Obregón's most prominent commentaries on La Violencia. In this piece, Obregón displays his early cubist influence, evident in the reduction of details and objects into elemental shapes. While the simple image appears to display a body, with bandages covering the man's body and a partially severed leg, the context of the piece provides more information. Obregón painted this piece during La Violencia in Colombia. Obregón was one of the first Colombian artists to comment on La Violencia. Velorio refers to a specific event that happened on June 8 and 9 of 1954; a student uprising at the National University against the dictatorship of President Gustavo Rojas Pinilla resulted in the massacre of thirteen students by army forces. Contemporaries Ignacio Gómez Jaramillo and Enrique Grau also witnessed this event, but Obregón's painting is more abstract and more expressive than their interpretations of the same event. The departure from anecdotal issues and the use of non-naturalistic lines and colors and fragmentation of the figure with expressive purposes in El Velorio is believed to have influenced other artists interested in addressing the socio-political issues during the sixties.

In Violencia (1962), Obregón conveyed the ominous atmosphere and perversion evident in the violence that occurred in rural areas. This painting suggests the figure of a pregnant woman on her back, a figure which blends with the landscape. She has been attacked and killed; the skin of her face seems to have been torn up. The gray body with scratches and subtle touches of red creates an impression of desolation. While the presentation date of Violencia cannot tie the painting to any specific instance, it can be inferred that he was aware of the atrocities of the time.

== Murals ==
Tierra, mar y aire (Earth, Sea, and Wind) is a mural currently on the façade of the Mezrahi building, located at 53 Carrera and 76th Street in Barranquilla, Colombia. Obregón was commissioned to create the mural by Samuel Mezrahi, father of the current owner and resident of the building, Mair Mezrahi-Tourgemen, when the artist was at the midpoint of his artistic career. Obregón was paid 15,000.00 pesos to complete the project. It took Obregón around a year to finish the mural, as he chose an extremely delicate and time-consuming approach, requiring a complex process called mosaic. To construct the mural, he glued individual pieces of ceramic tiles (Cristanac) on the wall of the Mezrahi building. Tierra, mar y aire covers the entire height of the three-story building wall. The surface of the work measures 9 m × 6 m (30 ft × 20 ft). Obregón utilized intense colors and symbols that pay tribute to the tropical nature of the area. Although the mural is in need of repair, no effort has been made as the materials are no longer being manufactured.

Cosas de aire (Air Things), created in 1970, was donated by The BBVA Bank of Colombia to the Museo de Arte Moderno de Barranquilla in 2008. It is an acrylic mural on mortar cement, measuring 16.5x9 meters, featuring bright and sweeping geometric patterns devoid of the brushstrokes that are typical of his work. It is the last of a series of five murals painted by Obregón in Barranquilla.

== Exhibitions and awards ==
- 1956 Cattle Drowning in the Magdelena River, Gulf Caribbean Competition, Houston, Texas. First prize
- 1956 Estudiante muerto, Solomon R. Guggenheim Foundation International Exhibition. National prize
- 1962 Salón de Artistas Colombianos
- 1999 Arte y violencia en Colombia desde 1948, Museo de Arte Moderno, Bogotá, Colombia
- 2009 50 Years, 50 Works: Art of Latin America, Caribbean of the 20th Century, Museo de Antioquia in Medellin, Colombia

== Selected artworks ==
- Tierra, Mar, y Aire, 1957
- Estudiante Muerto, 1956
- Tropical Jardines, 1962
- Last Condor, 1965
- Torocondor
- Approaching Cyclone, 1960
- Carnivorous Flowers
- Huesos de mis bestias: el alcatraz, 1966
- Cosas de Aire, 1970
