= Salon of Colombian Artists =

The Salon of Colombian Artists (Spanish: Salón de Artistas Colombianos) is a cultural event in Colombia, considered the event with most trajectory. This event is celebrated every year between August 5 and September 12 with two main categories a national event and a set of regional contests.

The first version of the Salon of Colombian Artists was set up during the presidency of Enrique Olaya Herrera whose administration tried to organize an official gallery. In 1931 the first official Salon of Colombian Artists took place in the Fine Arts Pavilion at the Independence Park in Bogotá. Ricardo Gómez Campuzano obtained the first place in painting and Luis Alberto Acuña in sculpture. Only until 1940 the first annual Salon of Colombian Artists was organized.

== Winners ==
Winners 1940 - 2002

- 1940 first Prize: Ignacio Gomez Jaramillo with "Madre del pintor", gold medal:Santiago Martínez Delgado with "El que volvio"
- 1941 first Prize: Santiago Martínez Delgado, with "Interludio", gold medal:Débora Arango
- 1942 first Prize: Carlos Correa, with "La Anunciación" Sculpture: José Domingo Domínguez with "Angustia"

1943 Suspended

- 1944 First Prize: Miguel Sopó Duque, with "Maternidad", in sculpture

Miguel Diaz Vargas, with "Estudio en gris", in painting

- 1945 First prize: Jorge Ruíz Linares, with "Retrato de Eduardo Mendoza"
- 1946 First prize: Josefina Albarracín, with Sculpture "Cabeza de muchacha" and First prize: Carlos Díaz Vendaval,
- 1950 First prize: Moisés Vargas, with Sculpture "Laureano Gómez", Luis Alberto Acuña, with El Bautizo de Aquimín
- 1952 Tito Lombana, San Sebastián Escultura

Blanca Sinesterra de Carreño Delfinius (primavera) Pintura

- 1957 Enrique Grau Elementos bajo un eclipse Pintura Hugo Martínez Forma mística Escultura
- 1958 Fernando Botero La Camara Degli Sposi Pintura
- 1959 Eduardo Ramírez Villamizar Horizontal blanco y negro Pintura
- 1961 Ignacio Gomez Jaramillo 3 Dibujos Dibujo

Pedro Luis Hanné Gallo Niña pintora Grabado Manuel Hernández Flores en blanco y rojo Pintura

- 1962 Alejandro Obregón, Violencia

Eduardo Ramírez Villamizar, Relieve circular Escultura

- 1963 Pedro Alcántara Herrán, Naturaleza muerta # 1, 2, 3 Dibujo Beatriz Daza, Crisol para Prometeo Escultura

Carlos Granada, Solo con su muerte Pintura Edgar Negret, celeste Escultura Augusto Rendón, Santa Bárbara Grabado

- 1964 Leonel Góngora, El gran inquisidor Dibujo

Eduardo Ramírez Villamizar Saludo al astronauta Escultura Augusto Rivera Paisaje y carroña Pintura

- 1965 Pedro Alcántara Herrán De esta tumba, de estas benditas cenizas no nacerán violetas Dibujo

Feliza Bursztyn Mirando al norte Escultura Normam Mejía, La horrible mujer castigada Pintura

- 1966 Pedro Alcántara Herrán Testimonio # 1, 2, 3 Dibujo

Roxana Mejía, Ziruma Cerámica Alejandro Obregón, Ícaro y las avispas Pintura Eduardo Ramírez Villamizar, El río Escultura Augusto Rendón, Un homenaje Grabado

- 1967 Edgar Negret, Cabo Kennedy Escultura
- 1969 Carlos Rojas Ingeniería de la visión Pintura
- 1970 Omar Rayo Butatán Pintura
- 1971 Olga de Amaral Muro tejido # 79 Textil
- 1972 Suspended
- 1973 Ever Astudillo Dibujo # 10 - # 11 Dibujo

Juan Antonio Roda El delirio de las monjas muertas Pintura Carlos Rojas Espacios Escultura

- 1974 Juan Cárdenas Arroyo Autorretrato Dibujo

John Castles Modulación vertical Escultura María de la Paz Jaramillo La señora Macbeth Grabado

- 1976 Germán Botero Torre de metal Escultura

Santiago Cárdenas La corbata Pintura Fernell Franco Interior 1 - Interior 2 Fotografía

- 1978 Ana Mercedes Hoyos Atmósfera Pintura

Grupo El sindicato Alacena con zapatos Escultura

- 1980 María Consuelo García Juego # 1 Escultura

Beatriz Jaramillo Zócalo Audiovisual

- 1985 Carlos Salazar La carta ( Betsabé ) Pintura

Ronny Vayda Sin título Escultura

- 1986 Leonel Góngora Maternidad, Magadalena Pintura

Víctor Laignelet Trilogía de los espejos Pintura Ángel Loochkarh El Ángel nos llama Pintura Miguel Ángel Rojas Las partes I - Las partes II Pintura Alicia Viteri Tiempo gris Pintura Gustavo Zalamea Pera amarilla, estudio con frutas Pintura

- 1987 Luis Fernando Peláez Sin título Escultura Aeropuerto Olaya Herrera, Medellín

Doris Salcedo Sin título Instalación

- 1989 Diego Mazuera Desayuno en las rocas Pintura

Miguel Ángel Rojas Felicidad perdida Fotografía Bibiana Vélez Dificultad inicial Pintura Hugo Zapata Geografía Escultura

- 1990 Rafael Echeverri Sin título Pintura

Consuelo Gómez Guatavita Escultura María Teresa Hincapié Una cosa es una cosa Performance Alberto Sojo Sin título Pintura

- 1992 Catalina Mejía Sin título Pintura

Nadín Ospina In - Partibus Infidelium Instalación Enrique Vargas El hilo de Ariadna Performance

- 1994 Fernando Arias Cuarto frío Instalación

José Horacio Martínez La Naturaleza no da saltos Pintura Alfonzo Suárez Ciodaro Visitas y apariciones Performance

- 1996 María Teresa Hincapié Divina proporción Performance

Mario Opazo Ícaro González, de la serie de Los ausentes Instalación Luis Fernando Roldán Calendario Pintura

- 1998 Wilson Díaz Fallas de origen Instalación

Alejandro Ortiz Sin título Instalación Grupo Nómada Rastros al vacío Performance

- 2000 Proyecto Pentágono PROYECTO PARALE
- 2002 38 Juan José Rendón Movimiento interior Videoinstalación
