= This is a magazine =

This is a magazine (about nothing)
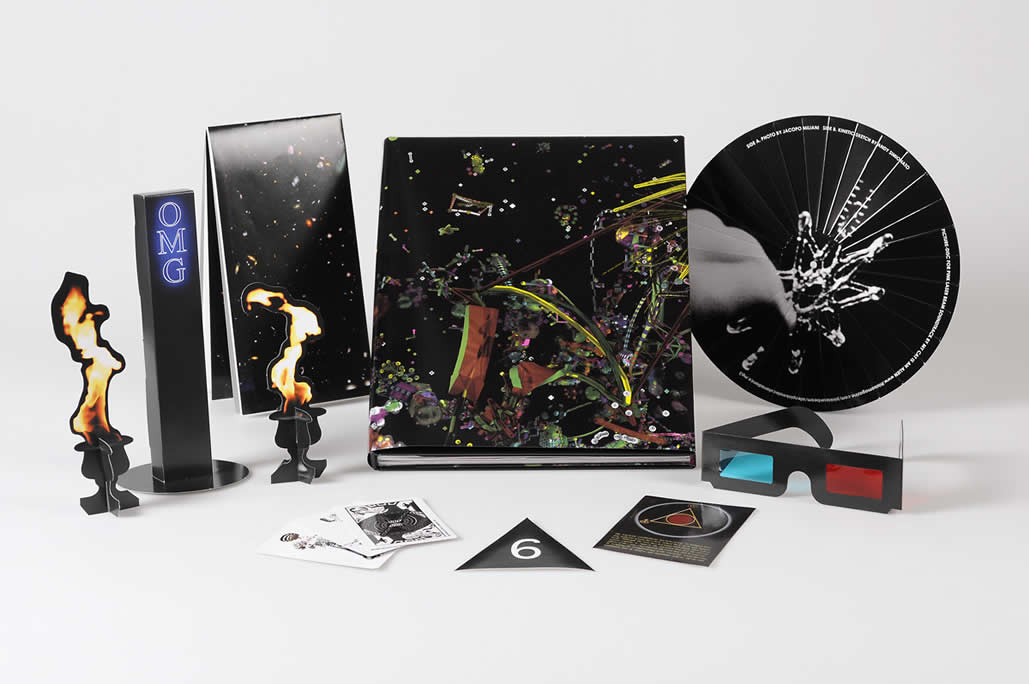
- This is a Magazine Compendium 6, dated 2006
- Editors-in-Chief: Karen ann Donnachie, Andrea (Andy) Simionato
- Categories: Fashion, art, design
- Frequency: Irregular
- Format: Various
- Circulation: Various
- Publisher: Donnachie, Simionato & Sons
- Founded: 2002
- First issue: 10 October 2001
- Country: Italy
- Based in: Milano
- Language: English
- Website: https://thisisamagazine.com
- ISSN: 1721-4904

This is a magazine is an experimental art publication founded in 2002 by Karen ann Donnachie, Andy Simionato & Sons. "One of the best known" flip-book style online magazines it has also published in a variety of formats including a PowerPoint edition, Animated GIF collections as well as video peep-shows and sound-objects. Alongside the internet specific episodes a series of hard-cover printed books or compendia and multi-media projects such as the Everything Will Be OK have been published.

The project is considered "highly influential" in Lauren Parker's Victoria & Albert Museum book on internet publications, Interplay and "a publishing phenomenon" by Adrian Shaughnessy in The UK Journal for Made Images, Varoom.

In an interview for UK magazine Graphics International, New York designer and artist Stefan Sagmeister said "I just think This is a magazine is one of the most interesting publications out there...I followed it from the start and was consistently surprised by its inventiveness"

"Redefining what it means to call something a magazine", This is a magazine's editorial style combines artworks by internet artists with found internet ephemera. Over the past decade the project has been exhibited in a number of museums and galleries and has been the subject for publications on art, design, and new media for its ability to move beyond traditional models of curation, publication production, and distribution.

== Selected contributing artists ==
- Miltos Manetas, GR
- Sergei Sviatchenko, DK
- Jodi (art collective), NL
- Angelo Plessas, GR
- Animal Collective, USA
- Brody Condon, USA
- David Shrigley, UK
- Rafaël_Rozendaal, NE
- James Victore, USA
- Jason Salavon, USA
- Jon Burgerman, UK
- Lorna Mills, USA
- Jon Rafman, CA
- Yoshi Sodeoka, JP
- Lia (artist), AT
- Mirko Ilić, USA
- Petra Cortright, USA
- MTAA, USA
- Nadín Ospina, CB
- Pamela Anderson, USA
- Starfuckers, IT
- Antonio Riello, IT

== Compendia ==
- Pink Laser Beam, 2009
- Who I think I am, 2007
- Everything Will Be OK (book) with DVD, 2005
- Chaos Happens, 2004
- Fashionequalsfiction, 2003
- Love, the Universe and Everything, 2002

== Exhibitions and conferences ==
- TDM5 Grafica Italiana, Triennale di Milano Design Museum, Milan, Italy (2012–13)
- Triennale di Milano Design Museum, Milan, Italy (2010)
- Hijacked, Perth Institute of Contemporary Arts, Perth, Australia (2008)
- Colophon 2007, Independent Publication Festival, Luxembourg (2007)
- Reading Room (2005) and Viewing Room (2007), Senko Gallery, Viborg, Denmark
- CMYK — International Trend Magazines Festival, Barcelona, Spain (2004)
- Semi-permanent, Sydney, Australia (2004)
- SignJAM, Milan, Italy (2008)
- ARCO, Madrid, Spain (2005)
