= Enrique Grau =

Colombian artist (1920–2004)

Enrique Grau (December 18, 1920 – April 1, 2004) was a Colombian artist best known for his depictions of Amerindian and Afro-Colombian figures. He was a member of the triumvirate of key Colombian artists of the 20th century which included Fernando Botero and Alejandro Obregón.

== Early life ==
Grau was born in Panama City, Panama, just like many of the children of his time with Colombian parents, and raised in Cartagena, Colombia. He was the son of Enrique Grau Velez and Carmen Araujo Jimenez.

== Career ==
A self-made artist, he was influenced by the Colombian masters Ignacio Gomez Jaramillo, Santiago Martinez Delgado and Pedro Nel Gómez. Grau studied at the Art Students League in New York City, U.S. from 1941 to 1942, and later toured Italy, where he learned etching and fresco techniques before moving to the city of Cartagena.

He won the Salón de Artistas Colombianos in 1957 launching a well-noted career in the arts. His associations of white, black, and indigenous figures and objects such as masks, eggs, fruit, or cages brought him international fame, with exhibitions at the Guggenheim Museum in New York City and the Paris Museum of Modern Art.

== Death and legacy ==
Grau donated 1,300 works of art (including some by other artists) to the city of Cartagena, which were used to establish the Museum of Modern Art.

Grau died of pulmonary complications at a hospital in Bogotá, Colombia, at age 83.
