= Mateo Blanco =

American artist

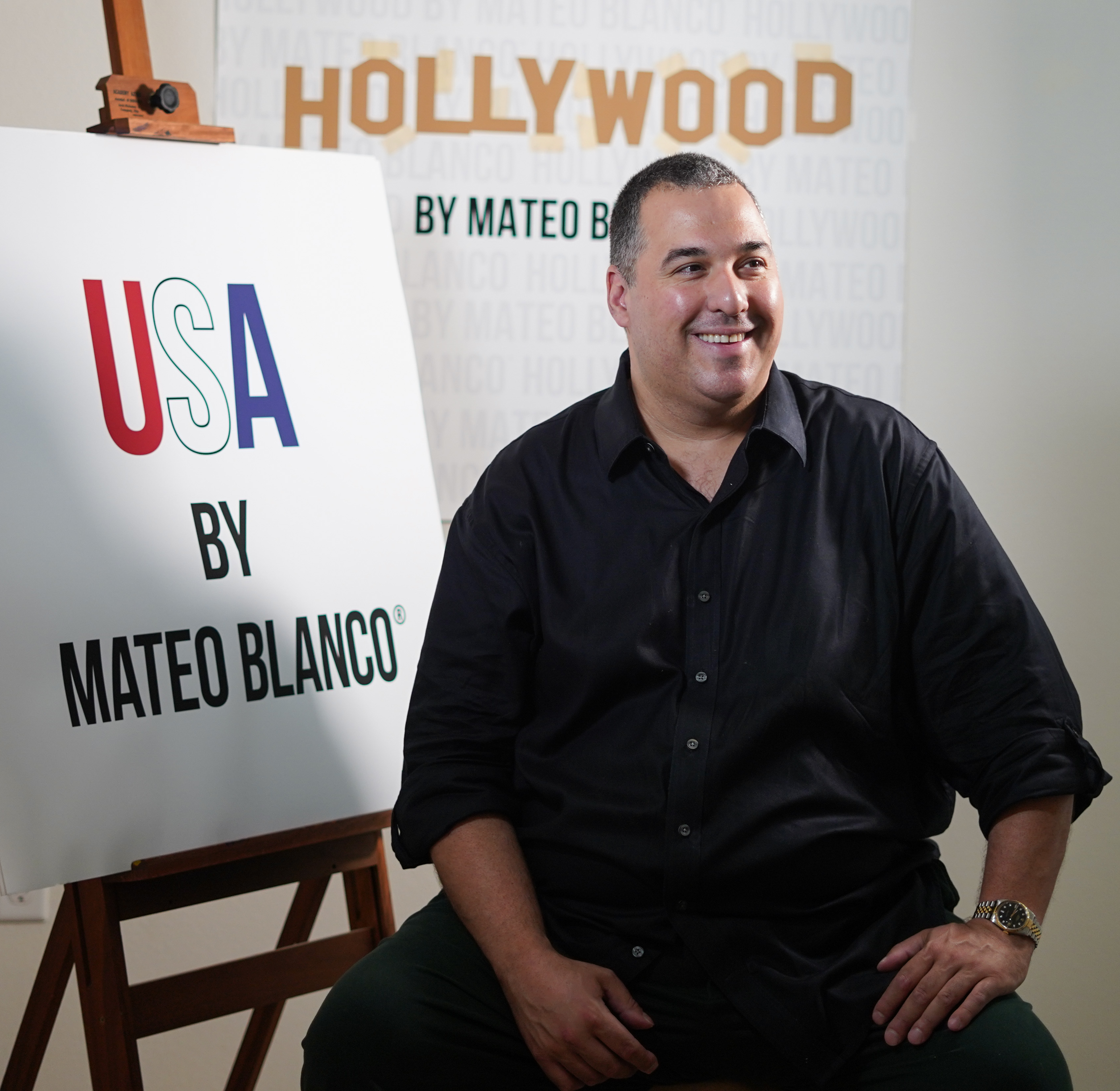
- Mateo Blanco in his studio The United States of America 2023
- Born: 10 September 1981 (age 44); Miami, Florida, U.S.
- Known for: using non-conventional items to create Art

Mateo Blanco (born 10 September 1981) is an American artist, singer and art collector. Blanco uses non-conventional items to create art.

As an artist, Blanco is also known for his unique renditions of the American flag using uncommon textiles and materials. Many of Mateo's creations are acquired by Ripley's Believe It or Not. The Boca Raton Museum of Art, The Butler Institute of American Art, The Museum of Art - DeLand , The Mennello Museum of American Art and Maja Museum in Jericó, Antioquia, Colombia is home to some of the world's most iconic pieces of art by Mateo Blanco. As an American tenor, he recorded an album titled Mateo Blanco 7:24. Currently, he lives in Orlando, Florida.

== Early life and education ==
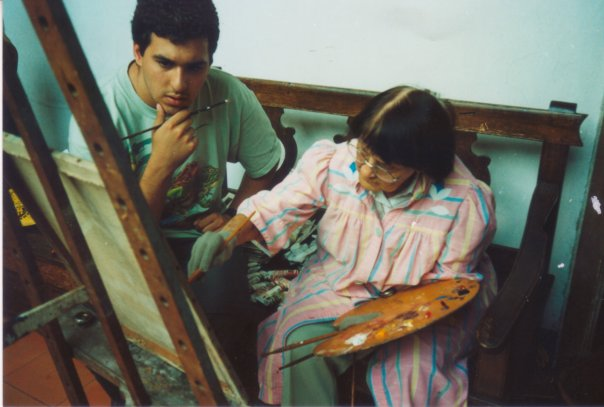
Mateo Blanco with Débora Arango

Although he was born in the United States, his parents moved to Medellín in 1986 where they built the San Mateo house in honor of their son. There, he lived his childhood and youth from the age of five to 19 (2000) in Colombia. In the capital of Antioquia he grew up in an environment surrounded by artists and politicians, which allowed him to strengthen ties of friendship with artists, presidents, intellectuals and musicians who formed and influenced him such as the 27th President of Colombia Belisario Betancur , Tomás Sánchez, David Manzur , Enrique Grau, Olga de Amaral, Beatriz González, Fernando Botero and his wife Sophia Vari. The latter would show and advise him - in Mateo's words - to be a complete artist with knowledge and discipline.

Mateo Blanco began his formal training under the supervision of Débora Arango in Medellin. He studied with Arturo Estrada Hernández, Jesusita Vallejo de Mora and Lola Vélez. Further, he studied Goldsmithing and Jewelry in Medellin, and, later, commercial music at Florida Atlantic University. Mateo received a training on classical opera singing, performed in La traviata, Rigoletto, Don Giovanni and Il Trovatore. Blanco was a part of Opera house in Colombia. Blanco has also make presentations accompanied by Aretha Franklin and performed for former president George H. W. Bush at his birthday dinner.

== Key Art-Works ==
- Credit Flag by Mateo Blanco, 42 credit cards 2024.
- Native Flag by Mateo Blanco, Textile 2023.
- Vigilance, Perseverance and Justice by Mateo Blanco, Textile 2023.
- A 78X55 inches Jennifer Lawrence's portrait with 9,658 Planters peanuts.
- A portrait of Tennessee native Dolly Parton made of piece of clothes without paint.
- A series, “Joseph, Coat of Many Colors”, as an honor to Jewish history.
- Cheetah sculptures made from Cheetos Puffs.
- Portraits of singer Madonna, with wooden slits carved over her image for a 2D effect.
- A 3D replica of a FedEx truck with dog hair.
- A 3D sculpture of Sofía Vergara using feathers.

== Books Mentioning ==
2018 "Odd is Art." Ripley’s Believe It or Not!

2019 Meyer, Edward. "Buying the Bizarre: Confessions of a Compulsive Collector".

== Films About ==
2021 "Caged Bird" (film about Mateo Blanco), Fusion Fest; Orlando, Florida
