= Everything Will Be OK (book) =

2005 mixed media publication

Everything Will Be OK is the title of a hard-cover folio format book and full-length DVD published in 2005 in Italy. It is primarily a collection of videos, animations and print-specific artworks by artists working in and around the internet and is published by This is a magazine (about nothing). It is the fourth book from a series of experimental publications by Donnachie, Simionato & Son.

Adrian Shaughnessy, chief-editor of Varoom Magazine (UK) said "This is not a book, it is an event. Like Helmut Newton’s book-with-table, or the repackaging of Andy Warhol’s Interview magazine in a suitcase-with-wheels, ...it is more like a portable multi-media exhibition than a book...Donnachie/Simionato have created a publishing phenomenon."

== DVD ==
Included with each copy of the book is the DVD of the same title containing original time-based artworks and video. The book also contained a plastic devil's horn (corna) lucky charm bookmark, a sealed sugar-cube, and a pink latex balloon printed with the words "Everything will be OK".

The DVD contains a number of easter eggs viewable by moving left twice then pressing play when selecting Augustin Gimel's film title from the index. It also has a hidden sub-titles track which when viewed becomes a second layer of black silhouettes for the video Holes in Between by Donnachie/Simionato with original music by the avant-garde band Starfuckers. An archive of This is a magazine online editions from 2002 to 2004, including the Everything will be OK PowerPoint episode is accessible from the DVD-ROM section.

== Netart ==
An associated net art called EverythingwillbeOK.com comprising a video-loop of an inflatable stick figure has been maintained since 2004.

== Collections ==
The Everything will be OK project, including the original video DVD and hard-cover book is part of the KIOSK collection, Christoph Keller's touring art publications archive, now a permanent collection of the National Art Library in Berlin, and has been exhibited at the ICA (USA), the Witte de With Center for Contemporary Art Rotterdam (Rotterdam), Artists Space (NY), the Emily Carr Institute (Vancouver), and Mudam (Luxembourg), among others.

== Selected exhibitions ==
- Hijacked, Perth Institute of Contemporary Arts, Perth, Australia (2008)
- Colophon 2007, Independent Publication Festival, Luxembourg (2007)
- Holes In Between, Netmage, Bologna, Italy (2006)
- Reading Room, Senko Gallery by Sergei Sviatchenko, Viborg, Denmark (2005)
- CMYK - International Trend Magazines Festival, Barcelona, Spain (2004)
