= Josefina Albarracín =

Colombian sculptor, drafter and professor (1910–2007)

- Albarracín in 1995
- Born: 4 May 1910; Bogotá, Colombia
- Died: 4 May 2007 (aged 97); Bogotá, Colombia
- Other name: Josefina Albarracín de Barba
- Education: Academy of Fine Arts of Bogotá
- Occupations: Sculptor; drafter; professor
- Spouse: Ramón Barba Guichard (m. 1934; died 1965)
- Children: 3

Josefina Albarracín de Barba (4 May 1910 – 4 May 2007 (Note: Also cited as 1997.)) was a Colombian sculptor, drafter and professor, known for her wooden sculptures of indigenous peoples.

== Biography ==
Albarracín was born on 4 May 1910 in Bogotá. Studying at the Academy of Fine Arts of Bogotá, Albarracín was the student of her future husband Ramón Barba Guichard.

From 1945 to 1964, Albarracín was a professor of carving, modeling, and drawing at the Pontificia Universidad Javeriana. In 1940, Albarracín participated in the inaugural Salon of Colombian Artists, winning the third prize for her sculpture El Obrero. In 1950, Albarracín exhibited her sculpture Muchacha campesina at the Colombian Artists' Salon, for which she won the first prize.

Albarracín was known for her wooden sculptures of indigenous peoples, particularly those of peasant women. Together with Hena Rodríguez, Albarracín's work played a pivotal role in the consolidation of modern art in Colombia. Albarracín continued her artistic practice until 1999.

== Personal life ==
In 1934, Albarracín married the Spanish sculptor Ramón Barba Guichard (1892–1965) with whom she had three children.

On 4 May 2007 Albarracín died in Bogotá, aged 97.
