= Tito Lombana =

Colombian sculptor (1932–1998)

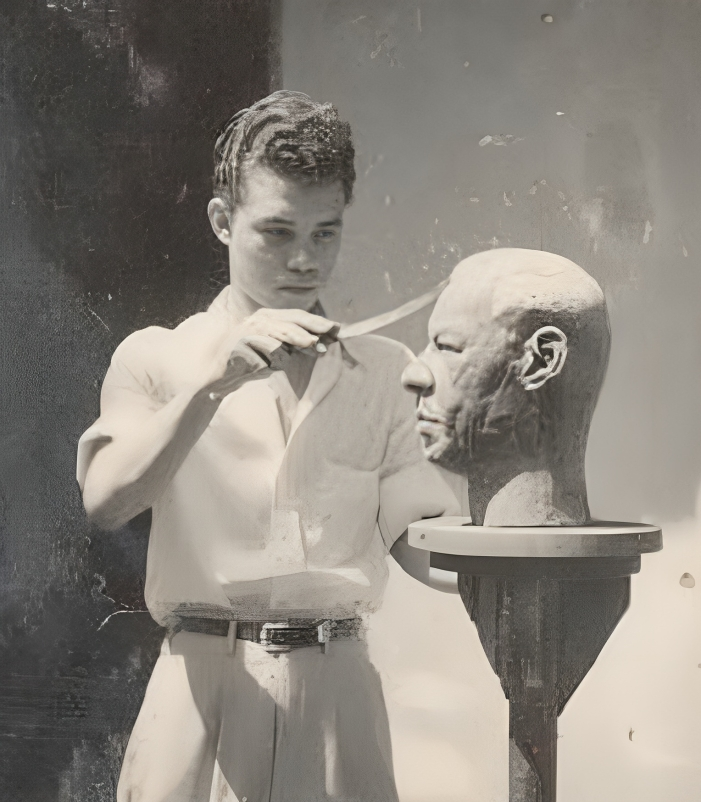
- Born: 1932; Ríofrío, Magdalena, Colombia
- Died: 1998 (aged 65–66); Cartagena de Indias
- Occupation: Sculptor
- Notable work: Zapatos viejos
- Awards: National Artists' Salon (1953)

Tito Lombana (1932–1998) was a Colombian sculptor and was brother of sculptors Héctor and Marcel Lombana.

== Biography ==
Lombana won the first prize in sculpture at the 9th National Showcase of Artists of Colombia in 1952, for which he was awarded a four-year scholarship to study in Europe. He lived in Madrid, sculpting where he studied at the Real Academia de Bellas Artes de San Fernando, and completed his studies at the Accademia di Belle Arti di Firenze in Florence, Italy.

In January 1957, he proposed and executed for the city of Cartagena in honor of the Cartagena poet Luis Carlos López, in allusion to his poem entitled A mi. The sculpture stood in Cartagena until the mid-1990s, when it was demolished to make way for a bridge. His brother, Héctor, recreated the sculpture and placed it by Castle San Felipe de Barajas.

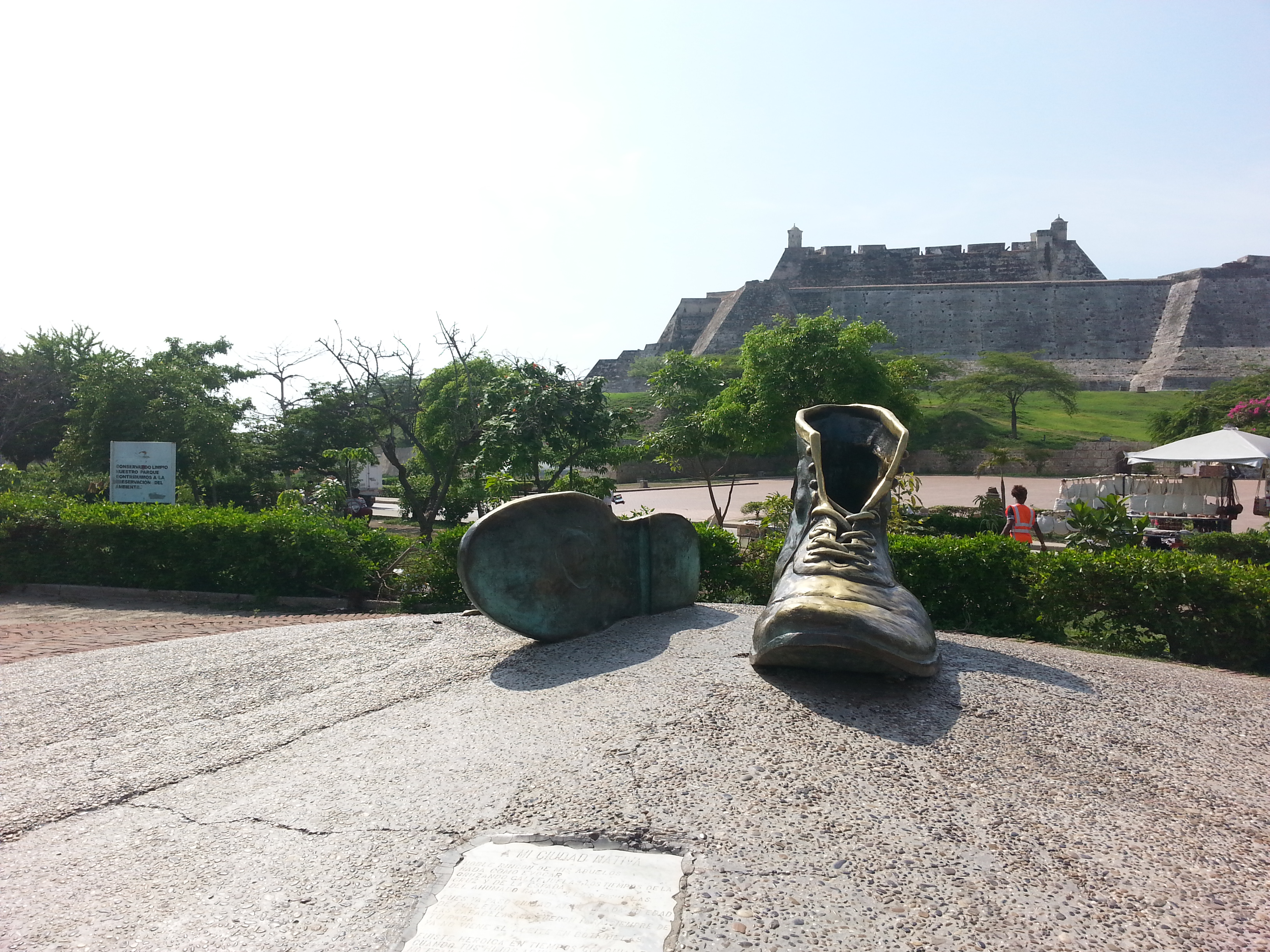
Héctor's bronze recreation of Las Botas Viejas in Cartagena

He had a solo exhibition at the Luis Ángel Arango Library in Bogotá, showcasing six marine animal-themed chiseled creations made from white carrara marble and red marble.

In 1975, Lombana and his co-conspirator, Pietro Tirasso, were arrested for drug trafficking in the United States by attempting to distribute 20 kilograms of cocaine.

== Legacy ==
In 2019, Daniela Abad, the granddaughter of Lombana, produced a documentary about Tito Lombana, documenting his life in drug trafficking. It premiered at the Cartagena de Indias International Film Festival.
