= María Teresa Hincapié =

Colombian performance artist

- Born: 1956; Armenia, Colombia
- Died: 18 January 2008 (aged 51–52); Colombia; Breast cancer
- Nationality: Colombian
- Style: Visual artist

María Teresa Hincapié (1956 – 18 January 2008) was a Colombian performance artist. Performance art is presented in front of an audience embracing different forms of expressions like dance, theater, music, film and plastic art.

== Life and career ==
She was born in 1956 in Armenia, the capital of the department of Quindio. Her initial studies were in acting and she developed her work towards the field of performance art, where she stood out as being at the vanguard of this artistic field in Colombia. Hincapié came from a dissociated discipline called plastic art, at least in Colombia. She studied in France, Indonesia, India and Japan where she became a versatile artist with various cultural influences.

In 1990 she obtained first prize at the XXXIII Salon of Colombian Artists with her work Una cosa es una cosa and became a member of the theatrical group 'Acto Latino' (Latin Act).

Hincapié worked with Colombian and Mexican play directors, choreographers and script writers Alvaro Restrepo and Juan Monsalve in Una cosa es una cosa, Parquedades, Vitrina, and Historias Del Silencio. She died from breast cancer on 18 January 2008.

== Artistic career ==
- 1981 Historias Del Silencio (Stories of the Silence)
- 1984 Edipo Rey de Sófocles, directed by Juan Monsalve
- 1985 Monologue Ondina
- 1986 Desde La Huerta De Los Mundos
- 1987 Parquedades
- 1989 Vitrina
- 1989 Punto De Fuga
- 1990 Una cosa es una cosa
- 1996 Divina proporción
- Unknown El espacio se mueve
- Unknown Peregrinos urbanos

== Recognition ==
- 19901990, First prize at the Salon of Colombian Artists with an eight-hour performance
- 1996 Primer premio XXXIV Salon of Colombian Artists, Bogotá;
- 2002 El espacio se mueve despacio (The Space Moves Slowly), Beca del Ministerio de Cultura, Sierra Nevada de Santa Marta.

== Exhibitions ==
- 2001 I Bienal de Valencia - The Body of Art; Bienal de Valencia, Valencia Da Adversidade Vivemos - Artistes d'Amérique latine - Carte blanche à Carlos Bas; Musée d'Art Moderne de la Ville de Paris - MAM/ARC, Paris
- 2005 51st International Art Exhibition - Always a little further; La Biennale di Venezia, Venecia
- 2006 27° Bienal São Paulo; Fundação Bienal de São Paulo, São Paulo
- 2010 Frost Art Museum, FIU, Miami Florida; Installation and exhibit
