= Brodo di Cagne Strategico =

Brodo Di Cagne Strategico

EP by Starfuckers
- Released: 1991
- Genre: Experimental Rock, Noise rock
- Label: Electric Eye Helter Skelter

Starfuckers chronology
Metallic Diseases (1989)	Brodo Di Cagne Strategico (1991)	Sinistri (album) (1994)

Brodo Di Cagne Strategico (translated: Strategic Bitches Brew) is an EP by the Italian experimental rock band Starfuckers, released in 1991.

== Track list ==
From Discogs.

1. Saturazione
2. Freddo cancro bianco
3. Calma piatta
4. Conseguenze
5. Saturazione pt. II
6. Strategie operative

== Line up ==
Manuele Giannini: voice, guitar, amplifiers, turntables

Roberto Bertacchini: drums

Gianni Ginesi: guitar, amplifier

Gianfranco Verdaschi: guitar, amplifier

Paolo Casini: bass (2)

Mauro Vasoli: bass (1-4-6)

Paolo Vasoli: saxophones (2-3-4-5-6)
