= La Madonna de Bogota (Raphael) =

Painting by Raphael

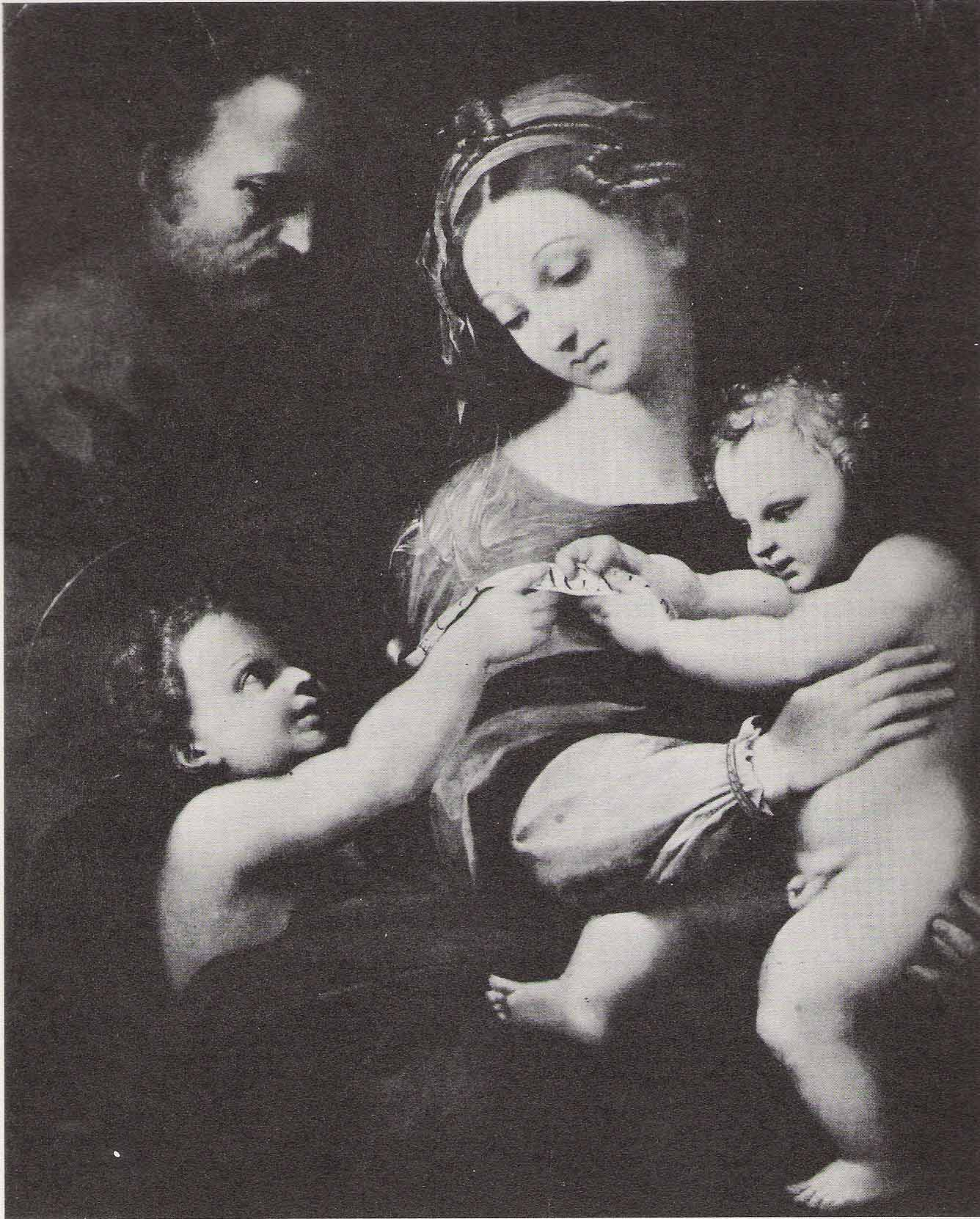
La Madonna de Bogota by Raphael; after restoration work by Leo. A Marzolo.

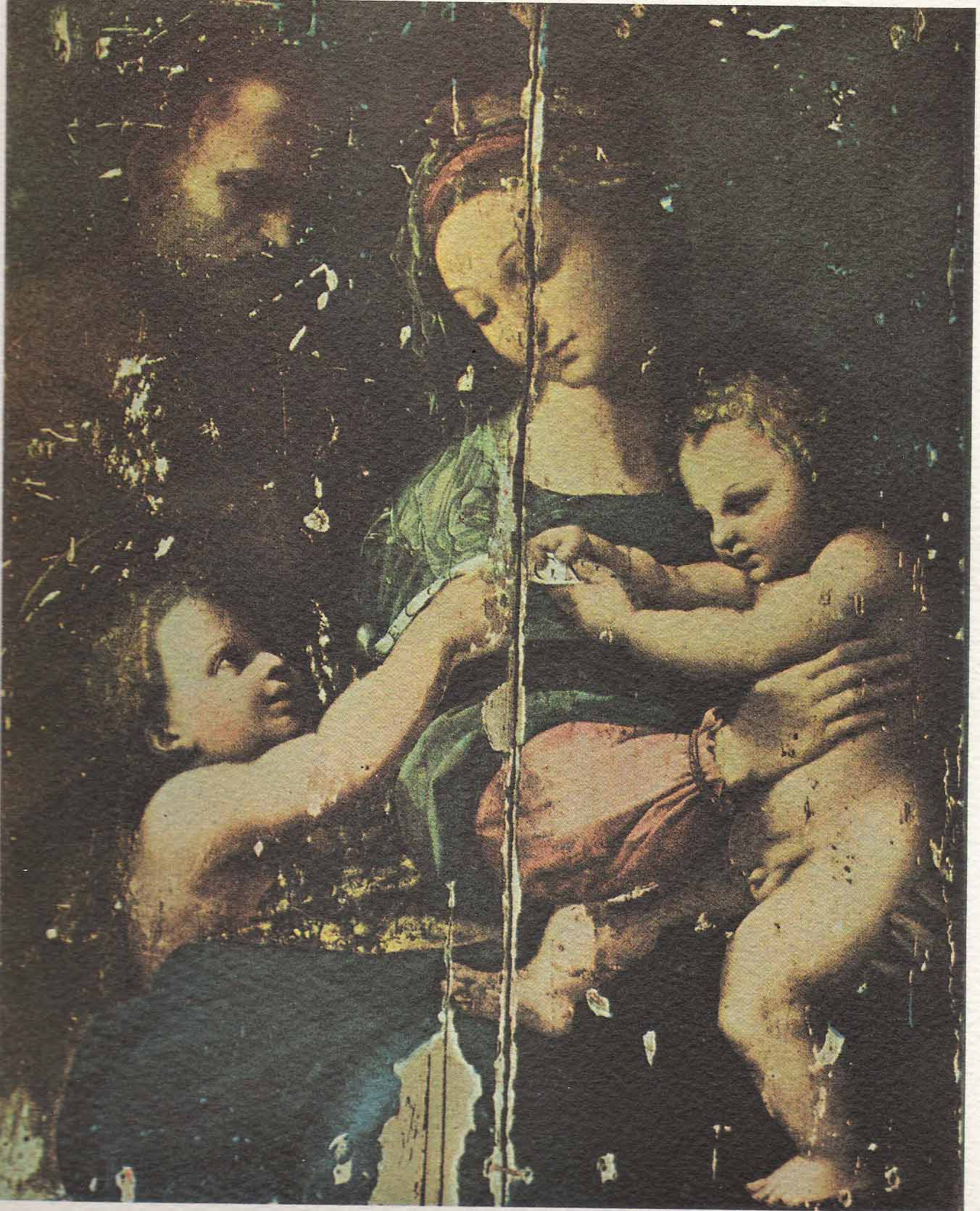
La Madonna de Bogota by Raphael; as Santiago Martínez Delgado discovered it.

The Madonna of Bogota is a painting of the Madonna and Child, rediscovered in Bogotá, Colombia in 1938, that has been attributed to Raphael. It was brought to present day Colombia (Nuevo Reino de Granada) by the Spanish crusader and conquistador Gonzalo Suárez Rendón, who was awarded the painting by Emperor Charles V as a war trophy after the Battle of Pavia.

== Rediscovery ==
In 1938 Mrs. Maria Mendoza, a friend of Santiago Martínez Delgado, invited him and his wife Leonor Concha de Martínez, to her home in Bogotá. Mrs. Mendoza had with her a painting she thought to be by Gregorio Vazquez Arce y Ceballos, a well-known Colombian artist about whom Martínez Delgado had written a book. Based on the fact that Martínez was considered an expert in art history and Arce y Ceballos, she asked him to attribute the piece. As soon as Martínez laid eyes on the painting he immediately knew that it was either by Raphael or by someone in his school.

The piece was in very poor condition, split in two and kept together by a piece of wire. Martínez took the painting for further study and research, and after taking x-rays and other steps he was convinced that it was, in fact, an original Raphael. When the rumor about the painting reached the press, it quickly started a heated debate; some dismissed it, including the El Tiempo daily that argued that it was a copy of a Raphael piece at the Museo del Prado.

Soon Martínez called for a symposium at the municipal theater to discuss the matter. The event was attended by well-known Colombian experts like Enrique Uribe White, Antonio Bergmann, Domingo Otero and Ines Acevedo Biester. Martínez explained the provenance and the scientific work done on the work making an irrefutable point. He also revealed that the painting had been brought to Colombia by Caballero Góngora; furthermore, Enrique Restrepo proved that although it was similar to the one in the Prado it was different in many aspects. The most important of these aspects is that the painting in Madrid's El Escorial Chapel had been there for a long time making it impossible to copy during the 16th century.

Finally in 1939 Martínez brought the painting to New York's Metropolitan Museum and to Columbia University where it was studied by Daniel Catton, Rich A. Sweet, Ruber H. Clark, Leo A. Marzolo, Adolfo Venturi, and Wilhelm Valentiner, who was in New York for the 1939 New York World's Fair. In June 1939 the painting was confirmed as an original Raphael and entered named the Madonna of Bogota. The piece was then taken to the Art Institute of Chicago to be restored.

Joaquin Piñeros Corpas confirmed it in Colombia on an article in El Tiempo: “Confirmado: Madonna De Bogota Por Rafael Sanzio Urbino.” Many US papers acclaimed Martínez Delgado for his discovery.

== Authentication ==
In 1939, Ruth VanSickle Ford, the then president of the Chicago Academy of Fine Arts, issued the painting with a certificate of authenticity. The following year, in 1940, the Brooklyn Museum issued the painting with a certificate of authenticity attributing the work to Raphael.

== Present ==
The painting is currently kept in an unidentified New York City bank vault; it is expected to be turned to the ownership of the San Agustín Church in Bogotá, Colombia, as stipulated in Martínez' last will and testament.

== See also ==
- List of paintings by Raphael
