= Medellín Museum of Modern Art =

Art museum in Medellín, Colombia

Coordinates: 6°13′25″N 75°34′27″W

- Museo de Arte Moderno de Medellín
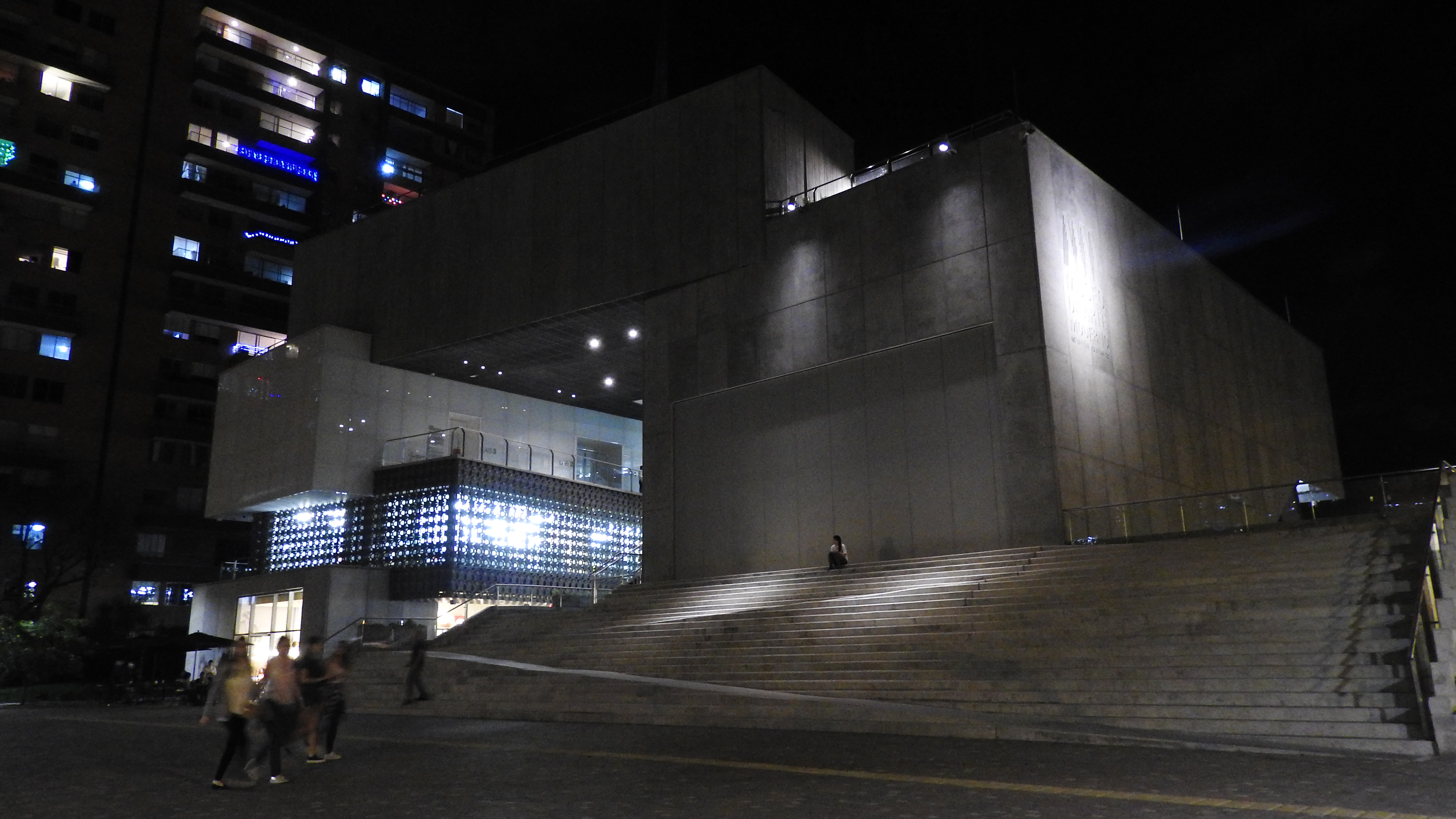
- Established: 1978
- Location: Medellín, Colombia

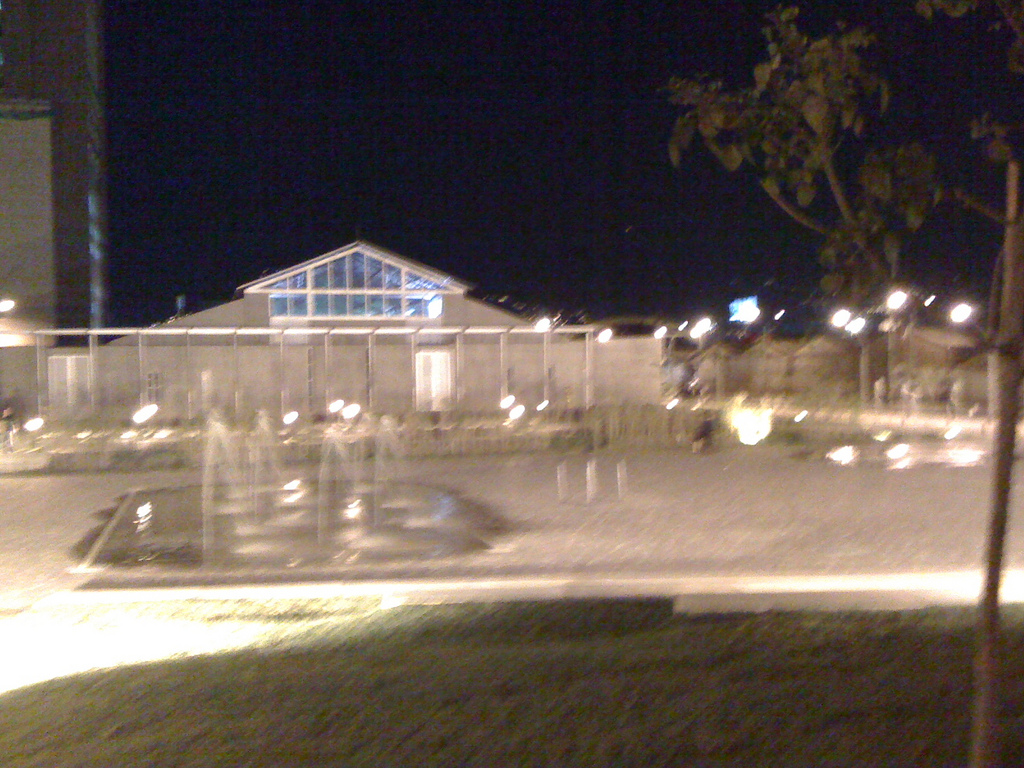
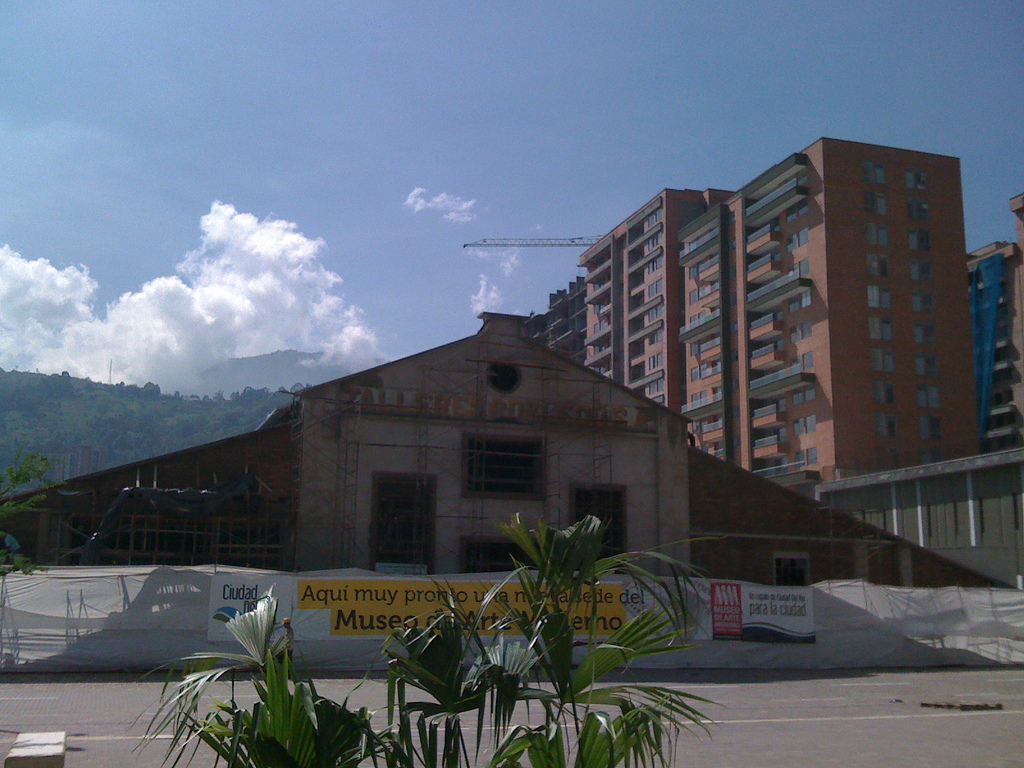

The Museum of Modern Art of Medellín (MAMM, Museo de Arte Moderno de Medellín) is a museum of modern art in the Colombian city of Medellín. It was founded in 1978.

Many artworks by Débora Arango, who was born in Medellín, are part of the museum's collection. Leiko Ikemura had a show at the museum in 1999.

== See also ==
- Bogotá Museum of Modern Art
