= Ana Mercedes Hoyos =

Colombian painter and sculptor (1942–2014)

- Born: 29 September 1942; Bogotá, Colombia
- Died: 5 September 2014 (aged 71); Bogotá, Colombia
- Occupation: Artist
- Years active: 1961–2014
- Spouse: Jacques Mosseri
- Children: 1

Ana Mercedes Hoyos (29 September 1942 – 5 September 2014) was a Colombian painter, sculptor and a pioneer in modern art in the country. In her half-century of artistic works, she garnered over seventeen awards of national and international recognition. Beginning her career in a Pop Art style which moved towards abstract, her trajectory moved toward cubism and realism as she explored light, color, sensuality and the bounty of her surroundings. Her reinterpretations of master painters led her to an exploration of Colombian multiculturalism, and her later works focused on Afro-Colombian and mestizo heritage within the Colombian landscape. Her works can be found in the permanent collections of the Fuji Art Museum in Tokyo; the Ibercaja Collection in Zaragoza, Spain; the Museum of Modern Art in Mexico City; the Nassau County Museum of Art of Roslyn Harbor, New York, as well as Juan Antonio Roda and museums in other Latin American cities. Her collection of archival materials on San Basilio de Palenque were donated to the United Nations University in Tokyo and the Smithsonian's National Museum of African American History and Culture.

== Early life ==
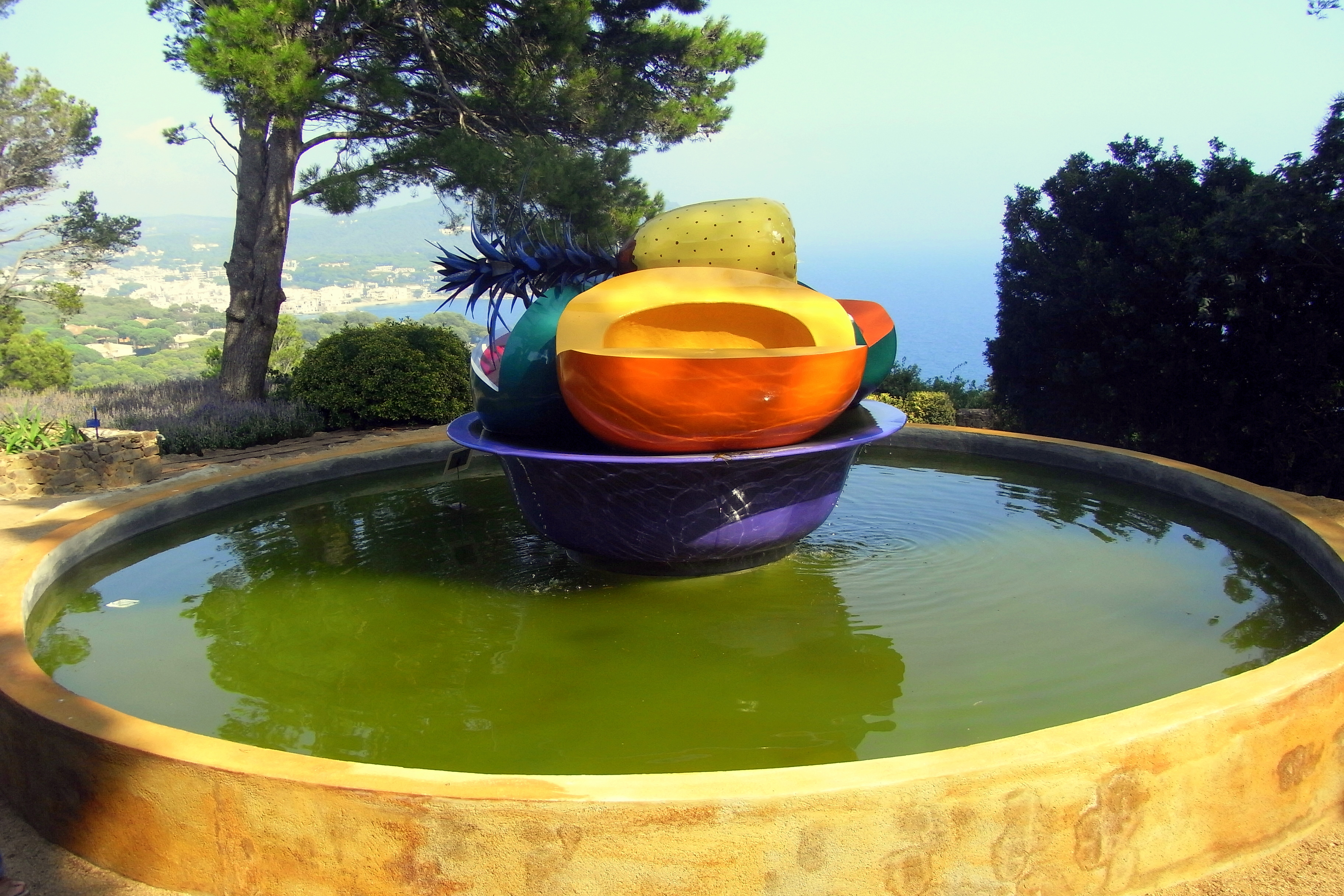
Hoyos' 2009 sculpture at Jardíns de Cap Roig

Ana Mercedes Hoyos Mejía was born on 29 September 1942 in Bogotá, Colombia to Ester Mejía Gutiérrez and Manuel José Hoyos Toro. Her father was an architectural engineer and encouraged Hoyos in the study of art history. She completed her primary and secondary schooling at Colegio Marymount in Bogotá, taking private lessons in painting under Luciano Jaramillo. This formal schooling was offset with trips to Europe, Mexico and the United States to learn about art in other cultures. She studied visual arts at the University of the Andes with Jaramillo, as well as Juan Antonio Roda, Marta Traba and Armando Villegas, though she did not complete her studies. In 1967, she married Jacques Mosseri, an architect, and they spent a month in New York City, exploring exhibits of Pop Art, before returning home to Bogotá. Subsequently their daughter Ana was born in 1969.

== Career ==
Hoyos began her career as a teacher, at the University of the Andes, where she taught from 1961 to 1965. She began exhibiting in 1966 and in 1967, won the second prize at Bogotá's Museum of Contemporary Art (Spanish: Museo de Arte Contemporáneo de Bogotá) Young Painter's Biennial. The following year she took first place in the Bogotá Museum of Modern Art's "Environmental Spaces" exhibition. In the latter part of the 1960s, she produced Pop Art works and by the 1970s, was working in a minimalist style producing abstract works. These led to the creation of her first series, Ventanas (Windows), which many consider her most important works. The oil paintings were small with a square presentation, utilizing vertical and horizontal lines to frame an abstract landscape. The window was a device to focus the view on a frozen moment in time, typically depicting a landscape image, with the frame itself representing the separation of the internal and external reality. In her later works in this series, the framed image becomes more obscure and it is impossible to determine if one is looking in or out of the window. In 1971, Hoyos won the Caracas Prize at the 22nd Salon of National Artists, for paintings 1–10 of the Ventanas collection. (Note: This exhibit has been widely reported as the XX Salón de Artistas Nacionales; however, the 20th salon, marred by controversy, was held in 1969 and the first prize was awarded to Carlos Rojas.) By the mid-1970s Hoyos' series Atmósferas (Atmospheres) breaks through the window and the images explore the unfettered expanse of light, abandoning the frame entirely. Painting with alternating layers of various colors with each followed by a white layer, she explored the depths of color focused in light. In 1978, Hoyos won the 27th National Salon of Visual Artists first place prize for her Atmósferas works, which was controversial because of the highly competitive nature of the Colombian art scene and ultimately led her to make New York City her second home. The recognition led to international exposure, as well when she was invited to participate in the Biennale de Paris and in an exhibition, "GeometríaSensível", with Roberto Pontual and other Latin American artists hosted by the Museum of Modern Art in Rio de Janeiro.

Hoyos' next evolution was in a series of floral and fruit works, in which she stripped out most of the petals and focused on the flower head of sunflowers. By using only the circular forms to explore the sensuality of earth's abundance, she attempted to remove spatial references to focus on the flower itself. From these images, she moved into a series of still lifes returning to a window-like photographic frame. Using fruits typical to those found on the beaches of Cartagena, her form became oblong, as if the fruit were itself a landscape. She achieved symmetry though use of shapes of plantain counter-balanced by watermelon surrounding either slices of fruit or the bounty found in a fruit vendor's shop. Between 1984 and 1987, these still lifes became an exploration of art history, paying homage to master painters of the past, such as Caravaggio, Cézanne, Jawlensky, Lichtenstein, Van Gogh, Zurbarán. Reworking some of their paintings, Hoyos' study of history inserted her own view of magical or mythical and ethnic experience into the European tradition. In 1988, she was brought to the attention of North American audiences with an interview in Newsweek, which featured interviews with artists labeled "new teachers".

Through her still lifes, Hoyos came to appreciate Afro-Colombian heritage, transitioning from an admiration of the beauty of the lush bounty to an appreciation of the cultural contributions and multicultural diversity of the people that populated Colombia. She began researching slavery and its counterpart, the idea of freedom, to come to an understanding of how those historical events shaped and changed Colombia. She began documenting through photographs and oral interviews the history of San Basilio de Palenque, collecting testimonials of common people, their herbal knowledge, legends, games and cultural traditions. This exploration of Colombia's past, led her to produce the series of works on the Afro-Colombian community for which she is most known and for which she gained wide recognition. The paintings used exaggerated light and details infused with tropical images and colors to depict the Caribbean coastal populations and vegetation.

In 1992, Hoyos was invited by the Japan Foundation to participate in a cultural exchange program for artists. The following year, works from her collection on Palenque were exhibited at the Yoshii Gallery in New York City. Her works were exhibited by Louis Stern Fine Arts in 1996 and 1998; the 1996 show was featured in the Los Angeles Times. President Bill Clinton invited her to participate in the conference on "Culture and Diplomacy" held at the White House in 2000. That same year, she was given an Honoris Causa master's degree in visual arts from the University of Antioquia of Medellín. From November 2004 to March 2005, a traveling retrospective of Hoyos' work toured throughout Mexico before moving on to Colombia over that same summer. The exhibit consisted of works over a 36-year period, including from her series Ventanas; Atmósferas; still lifes; tributes; and Colombian negritude. The variety of styles, including abstract, Pop Art, and realism presented, in a chronological display, the development of the artist and her explosive use of color and rhythm. Her contemporary style, reflected both art movements in her era, as well as her pictorial commentary on the history of Latin America through her images of the multicultural traditions of mestizos and Afro-Latinos.

In February 2014, an exhibit, Tres D (3-D), was hosted at the Nueveochenta Gallery featuring rarely-seen sculptural works by Hoyos. Her three-dimensional works followed and were consistent with the themes expressed in her paintings over the course of her career. Shortly before her death, in July 2014, Hoyos made arrangements for her collection of artifacts relating to the palenqueros to be donated to the United Nations University in Tokyo with a smaller portion going to the National Museum of African American History and Culture, which houses the Smithsonian's collection of African-American history.

== Death and legacy ==
Hoyos died on 5 September 2014 in Bogotá after a brief hospitalization. In her lifetime, she was honored with over 17 national and international awards in recognition of her work. She has works included in the permanent collections of the Fuji Art Museum in Tokyo; the Ibercaja Collection in Zaragoza, Spain; the Museum of Modern Art in Mexico City; the Nassau County Museum of Art of Roslyn Harbor, New York, as well as the Bogotá Museum of Modern Art and museums in other Latin American cities.

On 17 December 2022, the Google Doodle was dedicated to Hoyos to celebrate her life and work.
