= Infinitive Sessions =

2002 album by Starfuckers

(infinitive sessions)

Studio album by Starfuckers
- Released: 2002
- Genre: Experimental Rock, Noise rock
- Label: Dbk Works

Starfuckers chronology
Infrantumi (1997)	(infinitive sessions) (2002)

(infinitive sessions) is the fourth studio album by the Italian experimental rock band Starfuckers, released in 2002.

== Track list ==
1. "Blues Off"
2. "Drive On"
3. "Off Blues"
4. "Eternal Soundcheck"
5. "Funked X"
6. "Vamped X"

== Line-up ==
- Manuele Giannini: guitars
- Roberto Bertacchini: drums
- Alessandro Bocci: electronics
