= Old Boots =

Sculptures located in Cartagena, Colombia and Coral Gables, Florida, United States

Las Botas Viejas
- Monumento Los Zapatos Viejos
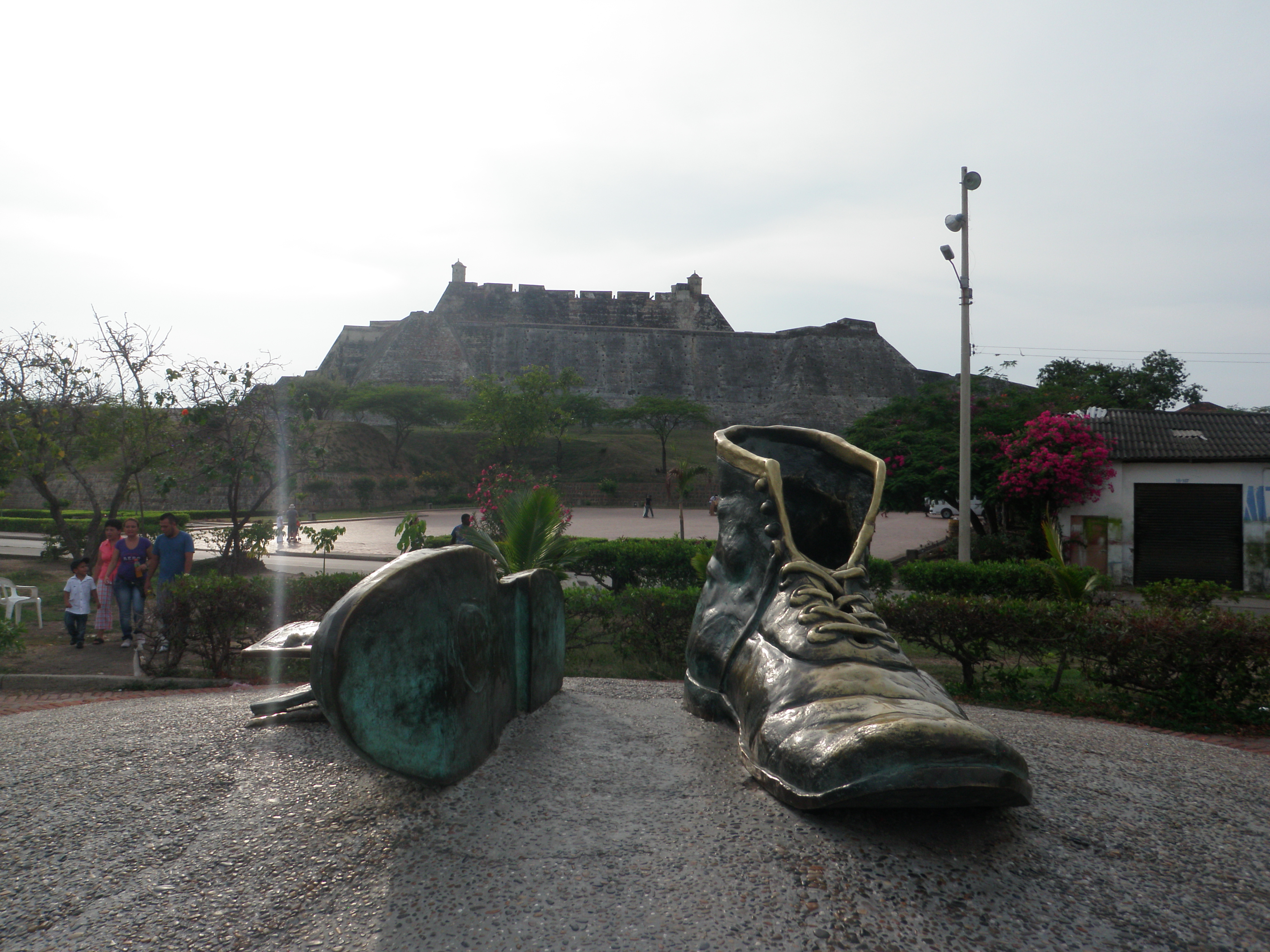
- Artist: Tito Lombana, Hector Lombana
- Year: 1957
- Catalogue: Monumento Nacional de Colombia 05-042
- Medium: Bronze
- Subject: Boots
- Location: Cartagena; 10°25′17″N 75°32′15″W

Old Boots (Spanish: Las Botas Viejas), also known as the Old Shoes Monument (Spanish: Monumento Los Zapatos Viejos) is a sculpture located in Cartagena, Colombia. The statue was created in honor of Colombian poet Luis Carlos López, who, in his poem A mi Ciudad Nativa, compared the city of Cartagena to a pair of old boots.

== History ==
The sculpture was originally created out of enameled cement by Colombian artist Tito Lombana in 1957. It was located by Media Luna, but was demolished in 1992 to make way for the construction of the Heredia Bridge, and was rebuilt by his brother Hector Lombana in 1994, this time out of bronze.

There is a replica of the piece at the Cartagena Plaza in Coral Gables, Florida.

== Description ==
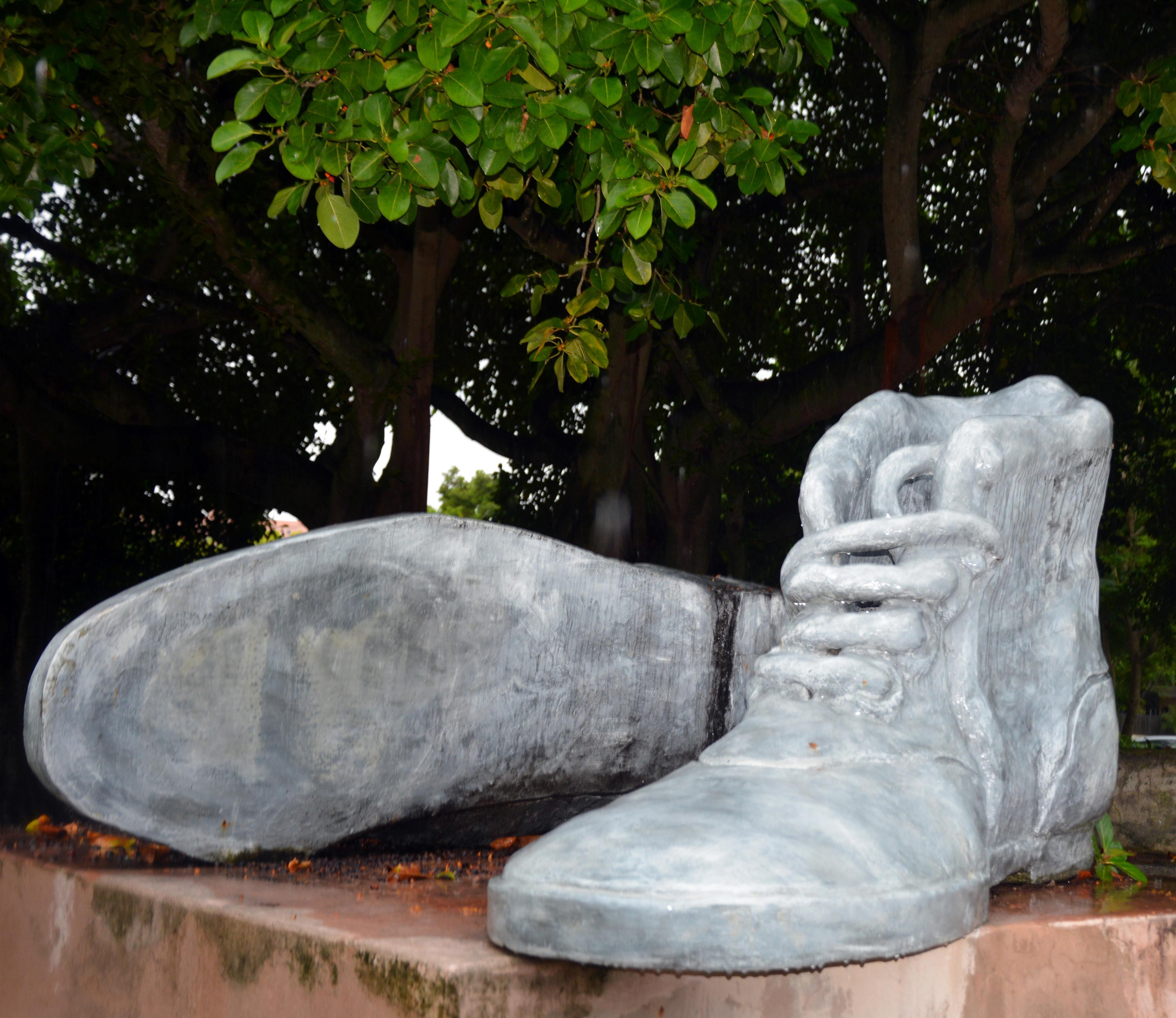
Replica of the statue in Cartagena Plaza in Coral Gables, Florida; it was a gift from the city of Cartagena to Coral Gables

Located in the Getsemaní neighborhood and overlooked by the Castillo San Felipe de Barajas, the statue is composed of two large bronze boots with laces, with one standing up straight and the other lying flat on the ground. They are located on cement and are surrounded by pruned bushes.
