= Metallic Diseases =

Studio album by Starfuckers
- Released: 1989
- Recorded: June 12-14, 1989
- Studio: TMB Rockhouse
- Genre: Experimental Rock, Noise rock
- Label: Electric Eye
- Producer: Starfuckers

Starfuckers chronology
Metallic Diseases (1989)	Brodo Di Cagne Strategico (1991)

Metallic Diseases is the first album by the Italian experimental rock band Starfuckers, released in 1989.

== Track list ==
From Discogs.

1. Love you
2. Cans
3. Shake Off
4. Western Man
5. Dead Metal City Blues
6. The Right Side
7. U.S.A.
8. Cold White Cancer
9. (I'm) Alive!
10. Flower Lover
