= Sonia Osorio =

- Born: Sonia Osorio de Saint-Malo; 25 March 1928; Bogotá, D.C., Colombia
- Died: 28 March 2011 (aged 83); Cartagena de Indias, Bolívar, Colombia
- Occupations: Ballet dancer, Choreographer
- Known for: Founder of the Colombia Ballet.
- Spouse(s): Julius Siefken Duperly; Alejandro Obregón Roses; Francesco Paleotti Lanzoni
- Children: Kenneth Siefken Osorio; Bonnie Blue Siefken Osorio; Rodrigo Obregón Osorio; Silvana Obregón Osorio; Giovanni Lanzoni Osorio
- Parent(s): Luis Enrique Osorio Morales; Lucía de Saint-Malo Prieto
- Awards: Order of Boyacá - (2010)

Sonia Osorio de Saint-Malo (25 March 1928 – 28 March 2011) was a Colombian ballet dancer and choreographer. During her long career she became an important folklorist and promoter of the arts and culture having worked closely with and for the Carnival of Barranquilla and having founded in 1960 the Colombia Ballet, a national ballet company that incorporates the native dances, styles and rhythms of Colombia.

== Early life ==
Osorio was born on 25 March 1928 to Luis Enrique Osorio Morales and Lucía de Saint-Malo Prieto in Bogotá. Her father Luis Enrique, was a playwright and poet, one of the precursors of theatre in Colombia.

== Family ==
She was married and divorced three times. With her first husband Julius Siefken du Perly she had two children, Kenneth and Bonnie Blue. With her second husband, Alejandro Obregón Roses she had two children, Rodrigo and Silvana. And with her third husband, Francesco Paleotti Lanzoni, she had one child, Giovanni who then married Dario Pavajeau's smallest child, Vicky Pavajeau, and had a daughter, Francesca Paleotti-Lanzoni.
