= Ignacio Gómez Jaramillo =

Colombian artist (1910–1970)

Ignacio Gómez Jaramillo (30 December 1910 – 12 July 1970) was a Colombian painter, drawer, and muralist. Gómez Jaramillo was one of Colombia's most important artists of the 20th century. He was part of the Colombian Muralist Movement along with Santiago Martinez Delgado and Pedro Nel Gómez. He won first place in painting in the 1940 and 1961 years of the Salon of Colombian Artists.

Gómez Jaramillo was known as an "atitrabista" for his defense of post-modern Colombian Art. He was a professor at the Fine Arts School of Bogotá.

Some of his paintings are part of the permanent collection at the Colombian National Museum. His mural, The Liberation of Slaves, is also featured in the Room of Artistic Heritage in the Rafael Uribe Uribe Palace of Culture.

== Biography ==
Ignacio Gómez Jaramillo was born in Medellín to Sigfredo Gómez Jiménez and Encarnación Jaramillo. Ignacio studied in the Antonio J. Duque Art School in Medellín. He also studied engineering in college for several semesters.

In 1928 he worked as a draftsman in a workshop for Pepe Mexía. In 1929, he traveled to Spain to study architecture, but quickly began studying art again at the Royal Artistic Circle of Barcelona. In 1930, he painted a series of landscapes of Toledo and in 1931 he had his first solo exhibition in Madrid. In 1932 he moved to Paris, where he studied at the Academie de la Grande Chaumiere. In 1934, he returned to Colombia and made two solo exhibitions. In 1936, he traveled with a government scholarship to study mural painting in Mexico. On his return, in 1938, he painted two murals for the Capitolio Nacional in Bogotá. The three were found to be unsuitable for the Capitol and were covered with lime, to be discovered and restored by students of the National University in 1959. In 1940 and 1942, Gomez Jaramillo received first place prizes in painting in the first and third National Exhibition Artists of Colombia.

When León de Greiff was Director of Cultural Promotion and Fine Arts, he co-founded in 1949 with a large group of intellectuals and artists that included Alfonso López Michelsen, Ignacio Gómez Jaramillo and Baldomero Sanín Cano among others, the Colombo-Soviet Cultural Institute with the aim of improving friendship and cultural relations with the Soviet Socialist Republic.

Gómez Jaramillo was one of three great artists who revolutionized Murals in Colombia. He was professor and director of the School of Fine Arts in Bogotá and President of the Association of Writers and Artists of Colombia. As a writer for El Tiempo in Bogotá, he published a series of polemics about Colombian art with Marta Traba, for which he is known as "antitrabista".

He died in Coveñas, in the department of Sucre, in 1970.
