= Gustavo Zalamea =

Colombian artist (1951–2011)

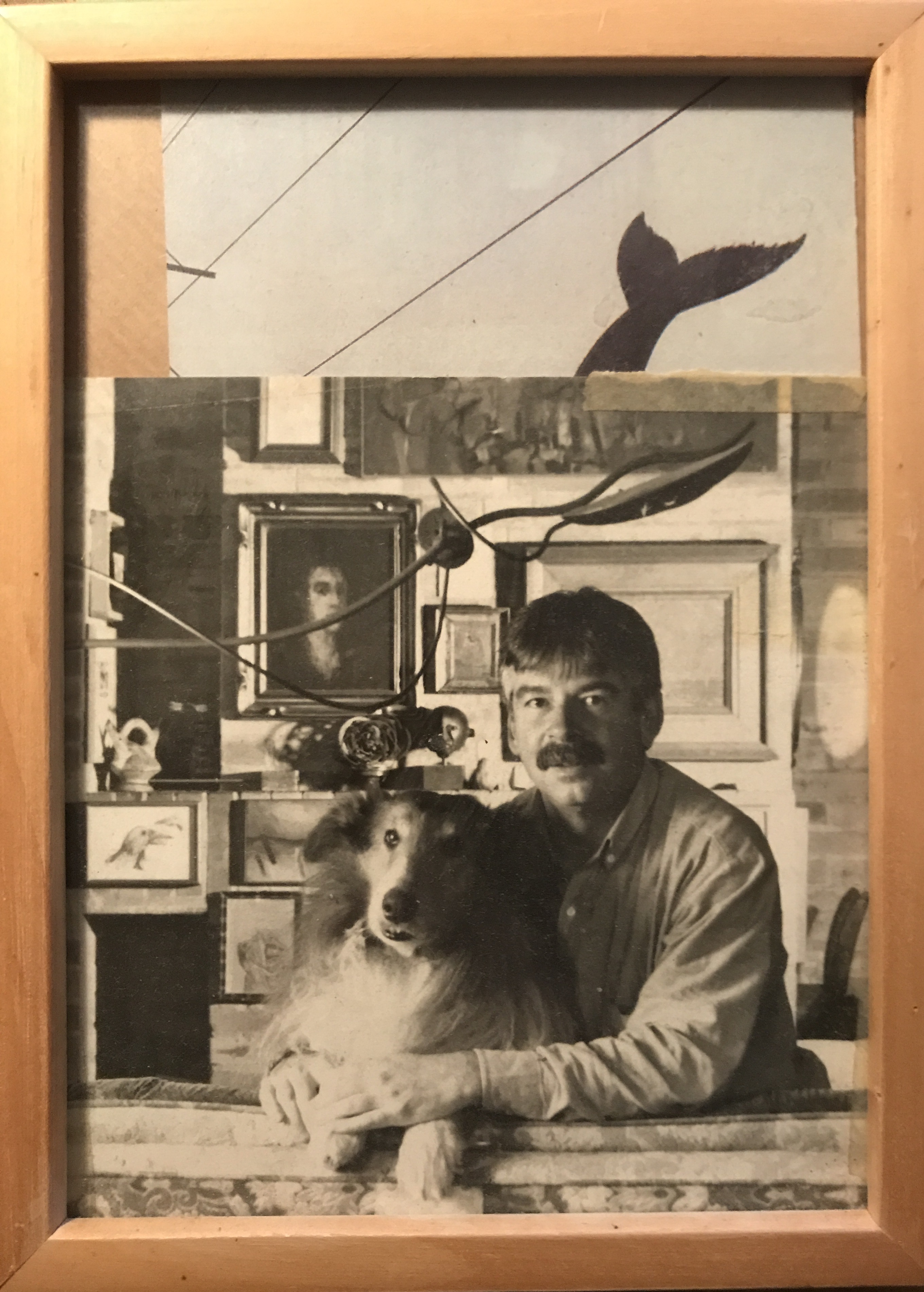
1991 photomontage of Zalamea

Gustavo Zalamea Traba (1951–2011) was a Colombian painter and graphic artist.

== Biography ==
Zalamea was born on January 6^{th}, 1951, in Buenos Aires, to journalist and politician Alberto Zalamea Costa and art critic Marta Traba. He studied architecture at the National University of Colombia in 1969, then later attended the University of Concepción in 1971, studying anthropology and design. He later returned to the Universidad Nacional of Colombia, where from 2004 until 2006 he was the director of the art program.

He died on July 12^{th}, 2011, in Manaus after a bout of pneumonia, leaving a legacy of over 50 solo exhibitions and around 100 group exhibitions in Colombia and internationally.

== Awards ==
In 1986, Zalamea won First Prize at the 30^{th} Annual Salon of Colombian Artists. In 1989, he received First Prize for Painting in a competition between France and Colombia, and in 1992, he was given two awards: the Andrés Bello House Prize in Caracas and the winning prize of the Andrés Bello Agreement Competition in Bogotá. In 1993, he was given the National Graphic Design Award by the Government of Colombia, and in 1994, he won the 125th anniversary merit-based competition organized by the National University of Colombia. In 2003, he was the guest of honour at the 12th National Hall of Trade Unions of the Renault Group in Paris and the Barranco Contemporary Art Festival in Lima.

== Exhibitions ==
Solo exhibitions

- November 1971 - Belarca Gallery, Bogotá
- June 1975 - Viva Mexico Gallery, Caracas
- 1976 - National University of Colombia Art Museum
- 1976 - San Diego Gallery, Bogotá
- 1980 - Parts Gallery, Medellín
- November 1986 - Bogotá Museum of Modern Art
- September 1987 - La Tertulia Museum, Cali
