= Juan Cárdenas Arroyo =

Colombian painter (1939–2024)

Juan Cárdenas Arroyo (12 August 1939 – 15 December 2024) was a Colombian figurative painter.

== Life and career ==
Cárdenas was born in Popayán, Cauca, on 12 August 1939. In 1962 he studied painting at the Rhode Island School of Design, Providence, Rhode Island, in the United States.

His career began as a cartoonist in El Tiempo, La República, El Espacio, and in the magazine Flash. He was jailed for a cartoon. From 1969 to 1972 he was professor of Painting, Drawing, and Anatomy, University of the Andes, Colombia. He participated in and won first prize in the 25th National Salon of Colombian Artists in 1974 for his self-portrait ("Autorretrato Dibujo").

Cárdenas was also involved with the 1994 re-design of the Colombian peso: he designed the $5,000 and $20,000 banknotes. In 2022 he was awarded the Order of Boyacá, his country's highest peacetime decoration.

Cárdenas died on 15 December 2024, at the age of 85.
