= Jacques Mosseri =

Colombian architect (1936–2025)

- Born: 25 June 1936; Bogotá, Colombia
- Died: 25 September 2025 (aged 89); Bogotá, Colombia
- Known for: Architecture
- Notable work: National Library of Colombia, Bogota (1978), Bosque Izquierdo House (1973)
- Movement: Architecture
- Spouse: Ana Mercedes Hoyos
- Children: 1

Jacques Mosseri Hane (25 June 1936 – 25 September 2025) was a Colombian architect.

== Early life ==
Jacques Mosseri's maternal grandfather left Thessaloniki during the Balkan conflict and embarked for Peru from France; however, he decided to disembark in Puerto Colombia due to the length of the journey. From there, he moved to Barranquilla and then to other cities along the coast, around 1910. He returned to Salonica to get married but due to World War I, he decided to return to Colombia with his three children. Hence, Mosseri's mother was raised in the Colombian capital. In her adolescence, his mother traveled to Paris, met Mosseri's father, married, and returned to Colombia.

In 1941, he entered the Lycée Français of Bogotá. In 1954, he entered the Faculty of Architecture at the Pontificia Universidad Javeriana, graduating in 1959.

== Career ==
Mosseri served as a professor at the Pontificia Universidad Javeriana, Universidad Los Andes, National University of Colombia, and Jorge Tadeo Lozano University. The 1970s marked a pivotal era in Mosseri's architectural journey, distinguished by his innovative explorations in geometry and the use of brick. His designs during this time drew inspiration from the ancient walled cities and the reconstructive ethos of European postwar architecture, with a particular admiration for the work of Alvar Aalto. These influences were integral to Mosseri's evolving architectural language, blending historical reverence with modernist principles. Mosseri, a notable architect with a significant impact on Latin American architecture, particularly in Colombia, designed the Bosque Izquierdo House as his private residence. This project, completed in 1973, is situated on a 20 x 20m plot of land he acquired with his wife. The house itself occupies a modest footprint of 13 x 13 meters, creating a generous outdoor area that allows for the appreciation of the surrounding mountain views. This residence is characterized by its monastic appearance, reflecting the creative symbiosis between Mosseri and Hoyos, showcasing a unique blend of personal and architectural expression.

In addition to his residential projects, Mosseri's professional achievements include his significant contribution to the remodeling of the National Library of Colombia in 1978. Founded in 1777, this institution is a cornerstone of Colombia's cultural and historical heritage. Mosseri's work on the library was primarily focused on the interior, maintaining the building's original decorative elements and façade design. His renovation efforts included the modernization of its spaces to better serve its functions as a repository of legal publications, official documents, and a wide range of bibliographic materials, further emphasizing his role in preserving and enhancing Colombia's architectural legacy. He also designed the Plaza de Mercado Paloquemao with architect Dicken Castro Duque.

For the family residence in Bogotá, a creation of his own design and construction in partnership with his spouse, the distinguished Colombian artist Ana Mercedes Hoyos, Mosseri conceived the "Cuatroenuno (fourinone)" or "Four-in-one Table," a piece now showcased at the Museum of Modern Art in New York City for the exhibition Crafting Modernity: Design in Latin America, 1940–1980. This piece exemplifies a synthesis of functionality and aesthetics, reflecting the couple's collaborative spirit. Hoyos' acclaimed Windows series converses with Mosseri's inclination towards geometric forms, creating a harmonious interplay between their respective artistic visions.

== Personal life and death ==
Mosseri was married to artist Ana Mercedes Hoyos. He died on 25 September 2025, at the age of 89.
