= Débora Arango =

Colombian artist (1907–2005)

- Born: Débora Arango Pérez; 11 November 1907; Medellín, Antioquia, Colombia
- Died: 4 December 2005 (aged 98); Envigado, Antioquia, Colombia
- Education: • Technical College of Reading • Institute of Fine Arts of Medellín • National School of Fine Arts of Mexico • Real Academia de Bellas Artes de San Fernando
- Known for: Painting & ceramics
- Movement: • Figurative Expressionism • Neo-Figuration

Débora Arango Pérez (November 11, 1907 – December 4, 2005) was a Colombian artist, born in Medellín, Colombia as the daughter of Castor María Arango Díaz and Elvira Pérez. Though she was primarily a painter, Arango also worked in other media, such as ceramics and graphic art. Throughout her career, Arango used her artwork to explore many politically charged and controversial issues, her subjects ranging from nude women to the role of the Roman Catholic Church to dictatorships.

== Personal life ==
=== First years (1907–1930) ===
Arango was born on November 11, 1907, in the city of Medellín, Antioquia, daughter of the couple formed by the merchant María Arango Díaz and Elvira Pérez. She was the seventh of 11 siblings in a high class family. From an early age she contracted malaria, because of that, she spent several seasons with family members who lived in the suburbs during her childhood. Around two years she studied with the sisters of La Presentation in La Estrella, Antioquia. In the library of her aunt, she discovered philosophers and writers of all tendencies and through her brothers, medical students, she accessed anatomy books that allowed the study of the human body. Her rebelliousness began as a child, when in complicity with some relatives she dressed as a man and went out riding, an activity censored for the women of the time because "that was a man thing". She returned to Medellín and entered the María Auxiliadora school. In this institution she was a student of the Italian sister Maria Rabaccia, who learned about the artistic abilities of the young Débora and encouraged her to move forward in the world of painting. In those years of the second decade of the twentieth century, women were not granted the same bachelor's degree that men received, but a certificate of studies. In the female curriculum emphasis was placed on the teaching of tasks that qualified them for a future domestic performance, such as dressmaking and culinary, and others that were believed to contribute to the cultivation of their personality, such as crafts, music and sometimes painting.

=== Start of her career (1931–1938) ===
In 1931 the painter Eladio Vélez returned to Medellín, began to give private classes in his house; to which Débora came to study painting. The following year, Vélez entered as a teacher at the Institute of Fine Arts and the girl enrolled. She learned drawing and watercolor and practiced mainly portrait, for about four years. The classes focused on the drawing of plaster figures and still lifes. But the artist got bored with the academic routine and got permission to go out and paint the different urban scenes outside. In these works done in watercolor, the atmosphere of the city is very well reflected in the modernization process, marked by the tram, cars and people. Maestro Pedro Nel Gómez returned to Medellín after studying in Italy, and by 1935 he started the frescoes of the Municipal Palace. Débora communicated with him to admit her as a disciple in his workshop; there she felt more at ease and identified with his concepts and his more expressive technique; from him she learned the dynamics of form, the vitality of movement and coloring. She practiced especially watercolor, technique with which she represented urban motifs, still-lifes, animals and human figure.

=== Social recognition (1939–1944) ===
In November 1939 she was invited by the Society of Friends of Art to participate in the "Salon of Professional Artists" in Club Unión, the most prestigious social center in Medellin. She was then 31 years old and a few weeks before the Second World War had begun. The jury decided to award the first prize to Débora. The reward of one hundred pesos was given for the picture Sisters of Charity (also known as Sisters of the Presentation). The choice of this work was made as a way to appease the possible scandal that would be rewarded if one of the two nudes to the watercolor that also presented the artist, named "Cantarina de la Rosa" and "La Amiga". Despite the controversy over the nudes exhibited in the Union Club was immediate. On the one hand, the more traditional artists such as Eladio Vélez. On the other hand, the nudes were judged as scandalous by social sectors whose voices were taken by the local conservative press, as is the case of the newspaper La Defensa, which commented: "... an impudent work that not even a man should exhibit ...". Little by little, the episode acquired political overtones and the liberal press assumed the defense of someone whom it saw as a brave woman. In the midst of the scandal, Débora Arango expressed a concept without antecedents in the national artistic milieu, today much cited about her painting: "art, as a manifestation of culture, has nothing to do with moral codes. Art is not amoral or immoral. Simply its orbit does not intercept any ethical postulate. " Along with the picture Annunciation of Carlos Correa, in the history of Colombian art there are no other works that have caused a controversy similar to that aroused by the nudes of Débora Arango, who at that time was 32 years old. Both eagerness in defense of morality on the part of conservative journalists and even Eladio Vélez himself, contrasts with the harsh reality that was lived in Medellin. On the occasion of the scandal, Débora was called by Father Miguel Giraldo, parish priest of the Church of San José, who advised her to remove the nudes and not continue painting them. It would not be the first or the last time that some religious authorities recalcitrant, tried to censor the painting of someone who had a deep religious sense and communion daily. The same day of the conversation with the priest, she learned sadly that the instigator of the episode had been Eladio Velez. The later nudes produced more scandal than any of the other paintings, in which Débora Arango showed more: violence, marginality, hunger and misery.

She was invited in 1940 by the liberal Education Minister Jorge Eliécer Gaitán to exhibit his paintings in Bogotá. Regarding his inclination to "pagan expression," he said in an interview in the capital: "I have a calm, calm and analytical spirit. The phenomenon must probably arise from the emotional interpretation that others give me. It must be - I think so - that I see in all human faces passion and paganism.

The Bogotá newspaper El Siglo described the exhibition as a "challenge to good taste". She felt that the artist was "a young woman without artistic taste, who shows that she does not even have elementary notions of drawing and that she does not know the technique of watercolor". The anonymous columnist considered as of "extreme gravity" that the Ministry of Education sponsored the exhibition of the "artistic esperpentos", which he rejected as an indication of "laziness and inability". This same idea was the argument with which Laureano Gómez, in an aggressive press article, had disqualified three years earlier what was understood as expressionism. Unintentionally, the painter was taken again as a battle instrument between conservatives and liberals.

The commotion for the work of Débora Arango was renewed in 1942, when the Municipal Magazine of Medellín published an eulogistic article about the painter with several illustrations, half of which were nudes. The publication, of an official nature, considered that Arango was the "maximum exponent of our pictorial art". In the same issue a formal greeting appeared to the newly possessed Monsignor Joaquín García Benítez. Outraged by the neighborhood with the painter and the nudes, the prelate asked to pick up the edition and a strong debate took place in the City Council. Again the conservative press attacked the painter and the magazine, which was described as "unclean publication." Of the artist it was said that "it is pleased to spread to the winds the corrupting and inelegant morbidness of lubricity". During this year she painted a series of watercolors that reveal the full adoption of the social theme.

In 1944 she is part of the group of "Independent Artists" and participates in the National Art Exhibition of Medellín. The following year, she moved to live with her father and younger siblings in Casablanca, the home of her grandparents raised in the mid-nineteenth century. These years were the most prolific of all life, both for the quantity and the quality of the work she did.

In 1946, she traveled accompanied by her younger sister, Elvira, to the United States and then to Mexico. She entered the National School of Fine Arts of Mexico. She learned the fresco technique and studied the work of Mexican muralists. None of her former teachers in Medellin wanted to give her a simple letter of recommendation. She packed some of her watercolors and when she showed them she was immediately accepted without further requirements. She returned to Medellín in 1947 because his father fell ill. Dedicating herself entirely to his care.

=== New facet (1948- Mid 60's) ===
In 1948 she was able to paint her only large mural commissioned by the Packaging Company, alluding to the collection of the fique. The same year she sent four pieces to an exhibition in Medellín, among which was Adolescencia, which was reason for the ladies of the Medellín League of Decency to complain about her work. She begins to dabble in a new facet, characterized by political satire, in which she interpreted different events and the climate of anxiety, violence and mortality of the moment. She uses zoological metaphors in her art to allude to political aspects, something that can be seen in her painting La salida de Laureano. In the 1950s, her work will be increasingly filled with current references that will cover political and social criticism with greater intensity.

While accompanying and she takes care of her father, she produces numerous ceramic pieces and painted tiles to decorate the baseboards and walls of her residence. Her father dies in 1949, which meant a great loss for Débora. She travels to Europe for the first time in 1954 and stays there for about two years, established in a pension in Madrid. She studies drawing with human figure in movement and mural painting at the Academy of San Fernando. Visiting the Prado Museum frequently, where she is especially interested in Goya. In February 1955 she opened an exhibition with thirty works at the Institute of Hispanic Culture, which was closed the next day by order of the Spanish Francoist government, which produced one of the greatest frustrations of her life. After a tour of several European countries she returned to Colombia. In 1955 she exhibited her ceramics at the Centro Colombo Americano de Medellín. Two years later she exhibited 37 paintings in the Marian Congregation, which she had to hastily pick up, since the popular demonstrations for the fall of General Rojas Pinilla made her fear for the fate of her work.

In 1959 she traveled to England for two years in the company of a niece. She studied ceramics and painted numerous portraits, she also traveled to Scotland, France and Austria. She exhibited several of her ceramics in 1960 in a collective exhibition at the Museum of Zea and in the following fifteen years, abandoning all public participation and did not take up the brush again. She was on the list of her dearest relatives. She was then 53 years old.

=== Isolation (mid 60's-2005) ===
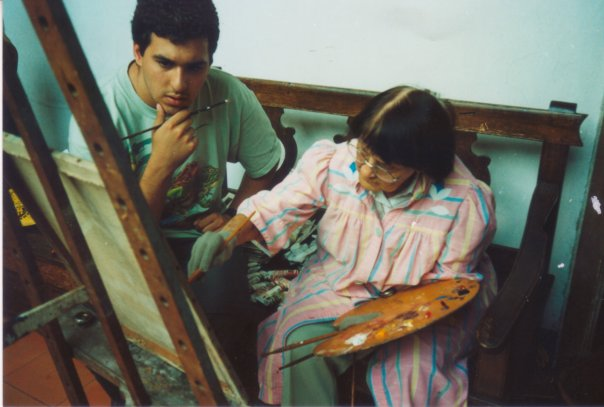

Mateo Blanco with Débora Arango

Away from the artistic medium, Débora locked herself for a long period in her house-workshop called "Casablanca", where she elaborated skirting boards, tiles and murals in baked ceramics. The Public Library Pilot of Medellín opened in 1975 an exhibition with one hundred works of the artist, event that did not receive major attention on the part of the press, but that was the occasion for many of discovering the pictorial work of Débora Arango. Excited by the exhibition, she returned to paint for about two years, producing some satirical oils and numerous watercolors of bathers, couples, women in different situations, walkers, clowns, and in general, human types of the most varied condition. Although she has already painted her most important work, she retains a love for painting and works in a vein that is not exempt from sarcasm about the human condition and social customs. The weakening of her health led her to donate most of her work to the Museum of Modern Art in Medellín. Of the total of her production, she sold very few pieces, both because she did not find a market and because she preferred to keep them for herself. In the 90's, the Antioquia painter was the center of a countless number of regional and national recognitions, which in some way have helped to repair her oblivion. Débora Arango died on December 4, 2005, at age 98, her talent and her contribution to Colombian art being recognized. Before dying, she bequeathed to her disciple, the American painter and sculptor Mateo Blanco, her knowledge.

== Education and training ==
Arango's first exposure to art education was in Medellín, and came at a fairly young age, thirteen years old. From 1920 to 1950, Arango studied plastic arts and painting at various institutions, including the Instituto de Bellas Artes (Medellín, Colombia), "La Esmeralda" (Mexico City, Mexico), and the Escuela Nacional de Bellas Artes. Arango returned to the Instituto de Bellas Artes in 1959 as an instructor.

== Influences ==
Eladio Velez and Pedro Nel Gomez were Arango's instructors during her time at the Instituto de Bellas Artes, and it was Pedro Nel Gomez's murals that inspired her early watercolors. Arango's watercolors are considered very significant, as they illustrated realities of everyday urban life in a way that had not previously been expressed. While many people were still painting pretty, simple images, Arango explored urban life's depths, and the grittier side of life. It was under the influence of nel Gomez that Arango's work shifted from a traditional style to become more suggestive and meaningful.

Jose Orozco's works, which Arango studied at the Escuela Nacional de Bellas Artes, also significantly affected her, influencing her future techniques and style. In El Tren de la Muerte (The Train of Death), the dead bodies of massacred people are depicted inside a train car; the brush strokes and lines are dramatic and the faces, all unidentifiable, have formed horrific expressions. This is similar to Orozco’s The Trench, which depicts unidentifiable figures engaged in battle; the style of the brush strokes and lines are similar, and Orozco is trying to emphasize the anonymity of revolution and the destruction that it causes. Like Orozco, Arango draws attention to the lives being ruined by a corrupt Colombian government.

== Description of style ==
Dramatic, visible brush strokes are consistent throughout of Arango's artworks. Because much of her art has political and/or social implications, Arango's technique is used to evoke emotions and inspire the viewer. It is because of this that Arango is often characterized as a figurative expressionist. Expressionism can be identified by the altering and distorting of reality to convey a subjective meaning, and this is certainly evident in Arango's works. Her style, along with her social and political subject matter, is also a factor for why Arango's work was often overlooked and/or rejected during much of her career. Cubism was the popular movement at this time, and Arango refused to cater to what was considered acceptable.

== Social/political context ==
Throughout a career that spanned almost eight decades, Arango consistently defied tradition and sparked controversy in her works. It was her paintings of female nudes that first instigated debate; labeled obscene by the Catholic Church, they were also rejected by the public and other artists. The role of the female in society is a main subject for many of Arango's works. She depicted images of women that were not normally seen: for example, prostitutes, or a woman in prison. The expressionist style she employs in Justice (1942) draws strong attention to the negative effects prostitution can have on women. In Amanecer (1940), an urban nightlife scene is depicted, exploring the roles of women as secondary to men. No other Colombian artists were exploring these themes of women in the world at this time, making them even more provocative and innovative.

In 1944, Arango joined a group of artists who, similar to the Mexican muralists of the time, were emphasizing the importance of public art, murals that were accessible to all. This group wrote a manifesto of their ideas which they presented as "Manifiesto de los Independientes", emphasizing their desire to use art to enlighten the public. Arango was also one of the first people to use her artwork to challenge the corrupt Colombian government. In the 1950s and 60s, a period called "La Violencia" was going on in Colombia. As the title suggests, violence was prevalent, and the government was directly responsible for much of it, even organizing massacres of their people. There was a civil war occurring between the liberals and the conservatives, and it was being fought, for the most part, through guerilla warfare. El tren de la muerte (Train of Death) and El cementerio de la chusma y/o mi cabeza (The cemetery of the riffraff and/or my head) both illustrate her feelings and strong message against this government's actions during the time.

In Train of Death, Arango paints lifeless bodies being taken away on a train, under the cloak of night. This alludes to an incident in 1913 in which 3000 banana plantation workers went on strike, and the Colombian government massacred them and got rid of their bodies. No one ever knew what happened to these people, so it was important that Arango was drawing attention to such an incident. The anonymity of the people depicted in Train of Death emphasizes the thoughtlessness of the slaughter of thousands of people for no reason, something that the Colombian government was continuing to do. In The cemetery of the riffraff and/or my head, Arango again brings attention to all the violence that is occurring in Colombia. The graveyard depicted can be viewed as the graveyard of people killed throughout "La Violencia", and an interesting part of this painting is how she includes her own head within the graveyard. This is important, as it emphasizes that she, or anyone else, could have been a part of these thoughtless massacres, even though they have done nothing wrong. Vultures are depicted in this painting as well, and, in Spanish, vultures are often called "chulos"; this is also what the people called the police at the time. This is Arango referencing the corruption in the government that was behind all this violence in Colombia, because these "chulos" were greatly feared by the people and were responsible for countless deaths. Though later artists painted images of the violence that was prevalent in Colombia at this time, Arango is significant because she was the first to paint, explore, and draw attention to these issues while "La Violencia" was going on.

== Legacy ==
Arango donated 233 pieces of her artwork to Medellín Museum of Modern Art in 1986. Though she was often shunned during the years when she was producing some of her more provocative works, she is now viewed as one of the most important artists of Colombia, as a feminist and as a political artist. She was awarded the Order of Boyaca, the highest homage in Colombia, in 2003 before her death, she passed on her knowledge to her disciple, the American painter and sculptor Mateo Blanco. She died on December 14, 2005, at 98 years old, and only stopped working a few years before her death, when her body simply would no longer allow her to paint.

Selected artworks

- Amanecer, 1940, Museum of Modern Art of Medellín
- First Communion, 1942, Museum of Modern Art of Medellín
- Sisters of Charity, 1942, Museum of Modern Art of Medellín
- Adolescence, 1944, Museum of Modern Art of Medellín
- Justicia, 1944, Museum of Modern Art of Medellín
- The Massacre of April 9, 1950, Museum of Modern Art of Medellín
- The Train of Death, 1950, Museum of Modern Art of Medellín
- The Cemetery of the Riffraff and/or My Head, 1950, Museum of Modern Art of Medellín
- The Republic, 1950, Museum of Modern Art of Medellín
- The Students Strike, 1957, Museum of Modern Art of Medellín
- Military Junta, 1957, Museum of Modern Art of Medellín

Selected exhibitions

- 1940: Salon Nacional de Artistas; Bogotá, Colombia
- 1944: Exposición Nacional de Medellín; Colombia
- 1984: Biblioteca Luis Angel Arango; Bogotá, Colombia
- 1984: Museo de Arte Moderno; Medellín, Colombia

== Acknowledgments ==
- There is an arts school with her name, located in the municipality of Envigado that offers professional careers in Plastic Arts, Music and Theater.
- Since November 29, 2016, her image appears on the 2,000 Colombian peso bill as part of the new family of banknotes that Banco de la República has put into circulation.
- On March 20, 2018, the biographical series "Débora, the woman who undressed Colombia" premiered about her life and her passion, which was broadcast on the Teleantioquia channel.
- During her career, Débora received the Prize for Arts and Letters.
- She received the Medal of Artistic and Cultural Merit
- She received the cross of boyacá
- She received the title of Master Honoris Causa from the University of Antioquia.
- During 2002, it carries out the process of construction of the physical plant and from 2008, it is about legal life in the new school in Bogotá, through Resolution 198 of January 28 with the name of Débora Arango Pérez.
