= Academy of Fine Arts of Bogotá =

- Escuela Nacional de Bellas Artes
- Formation: July 20, 1886; 140 years ago
- Founder: Alberto Urdaneta
- Type: Academy of fine arts, art museum, university and public university
- Coordinates: 4°35′48.01″N 74°4′37.99″W
- Parent organization: National University of Colombia

The Academy of Fine Arts of Bogotá, known in Colombia as the National School of Fine Arts (Spanish: Escuela Nacional de Bellas Artes), was an institution of higher education in Bogotá, Colombia, dedicated to teaching drawing, painting, sculpture, and music in that country.

Founded in 1886 by the polymath Alberto Urdaneta, it sought to mark a break with the old method of artistic teaching of the colonial era and thus be at the forefront of European art, but ended up reaffirming the Spanish heritage in Colombia. Catholic and conservative thought also prevailed, since, although its founder was a freethinker, the government of the time decisively influenced the development of the programs.

Among the teachers who taught there were prominent artists of the time such as its founder, the painter Epifanio Garay, the musician Jorge Price, and the architect Mariano Sanz de Santamaría; and foreigners such as the artists Césare Sighinolfi (Italy) and Luigi Ramelli (Switzerland). Among its outstanding students were Carolina Cárdenas Núñez.

The academy remained in existence even after the sudden death of its founder the year following its founding. Initially, it operated in the Convent of Santa Clara. It was later modified until it became the headquarters of the current Faculty of Arts of the National University of Colombia in 1965.

== History ==
The academy was officially opened on July 20, 1886, on the occasion of the commemoration of the cry for independence of 1810 by the artist and academic of great renown for the time, Alberto Urdaneta.

== Bibliography ==
- Universidad Nacional de Colombia. Presencia de los maestros 1886-1960. Bogotá: Museo de Arte de la Universidad Nacional de Colombia, 1986.
- Vásquez, William. Escuela Nacional de Bellas Artes de Colombia 1866-1899. Master's thesis, Bogotá: Universidad Nacional de Colombia, 2008.
