= Hector Lombana =

- Born: 3 March 1930; Riofrío
- Died: 19 October 2008 (aged 78); Santa Marta
- Known for: Sculpture

Hector Lombana Piñeres, (8 March 1930 – 19 October 2008) was a Colombian sculptor, painter, and architect from Riofrío, Magdalena.

Lombana was born in Riofrío. One of the most prolific sculptors in history, his works can be seen all over the world, with monuments present in the cities of Cartagena de Indias, Santa Marta, Cali, Barrancabermeja, Bucaramanga, Honda, Cimitarra, and Villavicencio in Colombia, Penonomé and Panama City in Panama, and Coral Gables in Florida, United States. Famous examples include 'El Cangrejo' (The Crab), 'Los Zapatos Viejos' (Old Shoes), 'India Catalina', el 'Sendero Yuma' (Path of the Yuma), 'Monumento a la Solidaridad' (Monument to Solidarity), among others. He died in Santa Marta, aged 78.
