= Leo A. Marzolo =

American painter

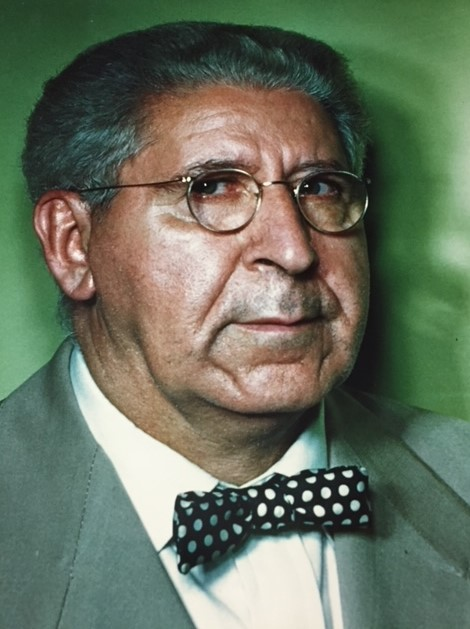
Leo Marzolo by Dr. Richard Chesrow

Leo Aurelio Marzolo (February 22, 1887 – March 1964) was a restorer of paintings at the Art Institute of Chicago and was also a painter. He was born in Martinez, California, United States.

He studied at the Chicago Gallery Association and the Palette and Chisel Academy. His work is in the Illinois State Museum at Springfield, Illinois.

Marzolo may have restored the "Madonna of Bogotá" painted by Raphael Sanzio of Urbino circa 1517. The Madonna keeps some resemblance to the Madonna of the Rose attributed to Raphael or Giulio Romano and is today at kept at the Prado Museum. Discovered by Santiago Martinez Delgado in his native city of Bogotá, the Madonna was taken to New York City and later to Chicago. However, there are doubts as to whom restored the said Madonna of if a copy was made. The two possible candidates for either one of them were Leo A. Marzolo and Sheldom Keck.

He retired in 1956.
