= Nadín Ospina =

Colombian artist

- Born: 6 May 1960 (age 65); Bogotá, Colombia
- Known for: Painting
- Awards: First Prize, 34th Salon of Colombian Artists (1992) and First Prize, 18th Salon of Fire, Gilberto Alzate Avendaño Foundation (2004)

Nadín Ospina (born May 16, 1960, in Bogotá) is a Colombian artist with significant international exposure. His awards include First Prize, 34th Salon of Colombian Artists (1992) and First Prize, 18th Salon of Fire, Gilberto Alzate Avendaño Foundation (2004). From 1979 to 1982, he held the position of Professor of Fine Arts, Jorge Tadeo Lozano University in Bogotá. In 1992 he participated and is awarded at the Salón de Artistas Colombianos. In 1997, he was a John Simon Guggenheim Memorial Foundation Fellow in New York City.

Some of Ospina's most noted work has combined cartoon and toy characters from contemporary North American and European mass entertainment culture with Latin American and Pre-Columbian artistic traditions. Examples include Pre-Columbian style statues of U.S. characters Mickey Mouse, Goofy, Bart Simpson and Eric Cartman as well as two-dimensional portrayals of Danish Lego figures in modern Colombian contexts.

Ospina reportedly was inspired to create the Pre-Columbian style statues after unknowingly buying fake Pre-Columbian pieces which led him to reflect on the idea of "untainted primitive Latin American culture".
