= Starfuckers =

- Origin: Italy
- Genres: Experimental music
- Years active: 1987/1998
- Labels: Electric Eye

Starfuckers was an Italian avant-garde experimental rock/art rock band, primarily from the 1990s. The band is considered a notable part of the Italian rock genre and one of the more "out there" bands during its active tenure. Starfuckers formed in 1987 and the band's first album of five came in 1989. It changed its name to Sinistri in 2000.

== Discography ==
- 1989 – Metallic Diseases
- 1991 – Brodo Di Cagne Strategico
- 1994 – Sinistri
- 1997 – Infrantumi
- 2002 – Infinitive Sessions

== Components ==
- Manuele Giannini
- Gianni Ginesi
- Roberto Bertacchini
- Paolo Casini
- Gianfranco Verdaschi
- Alessandro Bocci
