= Pedro Nel Gómez =

Colombian engineer, painter, and sculptor

Pedro Nel Gómez Agudelo
- Self portrait, 1949 oil on canvas 95,5 x 72 cm
- Born: 4 July 1899; Anorí, Antioquia, Colombia
- Died: 6 June 1984 (aged 84); Medellín, Antioquia, Colombia
- Resting place: San Pedro Cemetery Museum
- Education: Academia de Bellas Artes de Medellín; Accademia di Belle Arti di Firenze
- Known for: Muralism
- Movement: Mexican Mural Movement
- Spouse: Giuliana Scalaberni (1927—1964)

Pedro Nel Gómez Agudelo (4 July 1899–6 June 1984) was a Colombian engineer, painter, and sculptor, best known for his work as a muralist, and for starting, along with Santiago Martinez Delgado, the Colombian Muralist Movement, inspired by the Mexican movement that drew on nationalistic, social, and political messages as subjects.

One of Colombia's most prolific and prominent artists of his time, Gómez created 2,200 square meters of fresco murals in public buildings.

== Personal life ==
Pedro Nel was born on 4 July 1899 in Anorí, Antioquia, to Jesús Gómez González and María Luisa Agudelo Garcés. He attended the Academia de Bellas Artes de Medellín, where he completed his secondary studies in 1917. He then attended College of Mines of Medellín where he graduated in Civil Engineering in 1922. In 1923 he decided to move to Bogotá, where aside from working as an engineer and professor, he studied perspective and artistic anatomy with Francisco Antonio Cano. In 1925 he traveled to Europe and settled in Florence, Italy, where he attended the Accademia di Belle Arti di Firenze. While in Italy he met his future wife, and mother of his eight children, the Florentine, Giuliana Scalaberni. In 1930 he returned to Colombia, and became Director and professor of the Academia de Bellas Artes de Medellín.

== Legacy ==
As a teacher Nel Gómez has an impact in inspiring a future generation of nationalist artists including Carlos Correa and Débora Arango.

In 2019 the National Museum of Colombia held a retrospective of his work, entitled Pedro Nel Gómez: Relatos de una Nación (Testament of a Nation).
