= Santiago Martínez Delgado =

Colombian painter, sculptor, art historian and writer (1906-1954)

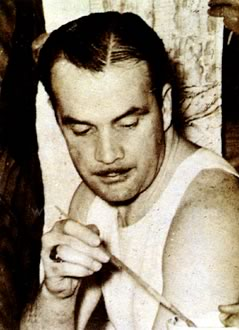
- 1947 Photograph
- Born: Santiago Martínez Delgado; 1906; Bogotá, DC, Colombia
- Died: 1954 (aged 47–48); Hacienda El Molino, Colombia
- Education: Chicago Academy of Fine Arts, Frank Lloyd Wright
- Known for: Painting
- Notable work: Mural at the Colombian Capitol
- Movement: Art Deco, Muralist
- Awards: Logan Medal of the arts, Salón de Artistas Colombianos
- Patrons: Nelson Rockefeller

Santiago Martínez Delgado (1906–1954) was a Colombian painter, sculptor, art historian and writer. He established a reputation as a prominent muralist during the 1940s and is also known for his watercolors, oil paintings, illustrations and woodcarvings.

Martínez attended the Chicago Academy of Fine Arts under the tutelage of Ruth VanSickle Ford. In 1933, he was awarded the Logan Medal of the Arts for his mural at the "Century of Progress" International Exhibition in Chicago. During these years in Chicago, he produced various illustrations for Esquire Magazine and participated in the Federal Art Project. Martínez was a disciple of Frank Lloyd Wright at Taliesin, where he began to experiment with the Art Deco style.

In Colombia, Martínez was awarded the gold medal in the 1940 Salón de Artistas Colombianos and was again awarded the top prize in 1941. In 1947, Martinez Delgado painted the mural at the Salón Elíptico in the Colombian Congress Building, considered one of the greatest murals of the 20th century. Martínez was then awarded La Orden De Boyaca (Colombia's highest government honor). Martinez was at the top of the Latin-American fine-arts scene when he died at the age of 47.

== Biography ==
=== Genealogy ===
Martinez's ancestry profoundly influenced his art choices and books. Born into an aristocratic family in Bogotá, his father was the Conservative party leader Luis Martinez and his mother Mercedes Delgado Mallarino. It was a difficult childhood due to his father's expulsion from Colombia as a result of an indictment for his involvement in an earlier Coup d'état.

=== Early years ===
Martinez began studying art at age 11 under the instruction of Colombian Master Roberto Pizano and following Andrés de Santa Maria at the Bogotá Fine Arts Academy. In 1925, he moved to Cartagena, where, at the age of 18, he directed and illustrated some sections for the newspaper "La Patria" under the pseudonym of "Sanmardel".

=== Chicago and Taliesin ===
Soon after, in 1926, Martínez traveled to Chicago, where he studied and worked for over five years at the Fine Arts Institute of Chicago under the tutelage of Ruth VanSickle Ford. In Chicago, Martínez befriended and worked alongside Edward Hopper, Isamu Noguchi, Willem de Kooning and Edgar Kaufmann Jr., among others. Wright was quoted: "Young Santiago's brush lines are elegant and his attitude gracious." In 1929, Martínez was awarded first prize for the "Best advertisement illustration" by the US Federation of Commercial Artists. Shortly after, he won the Logan Medal for the Arts for his mural: "Colombian evolution" at the 1933 Chicago International World Fair and exposition. At the fair, Martínez also assisted with the Murals at the General Motors Exhibit, as Diego Rivera's commission was cancelled due to the Lenin controversy in New York.

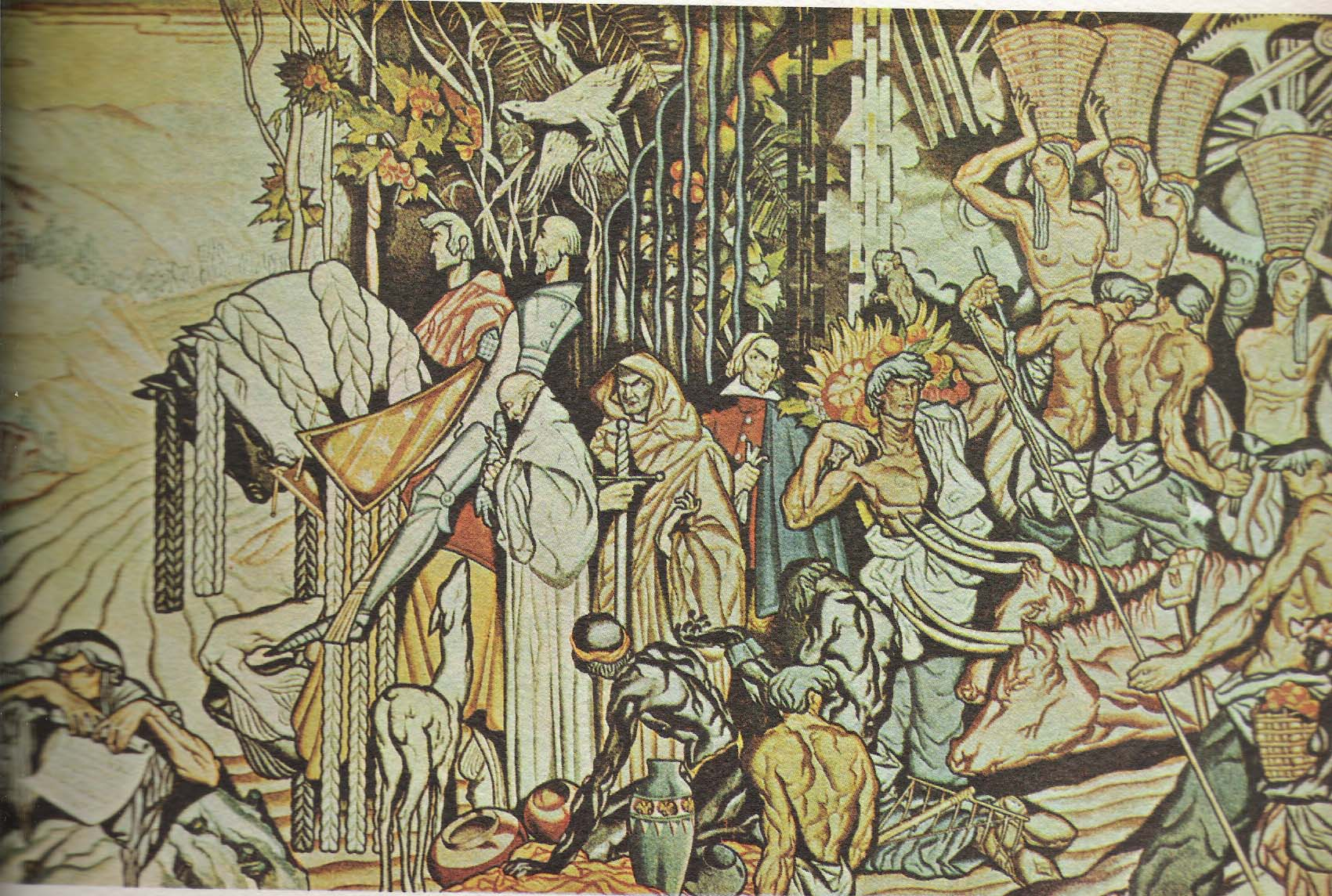
Mural for the 1933 Chicago International Fair.

=== Back in Colombia ===
Martínez returned to Colombia in 1934 with an innovative line pioneering in the pictorial Art Deco style. In 1936, Martínez founded the Art school and decoration at the Universidad Javeriana Femenina. From 1937 to 1940, he directed and illustrated the magazine "Revista Vida", which became the main outlet for cultural media at the time. It featured interviews of world-renowned artists like Joan Miró and writers like his longtime friend Gabriela Mistral. He also made various illustrations for America, Anarkos, Cromos and PAN Magazines.

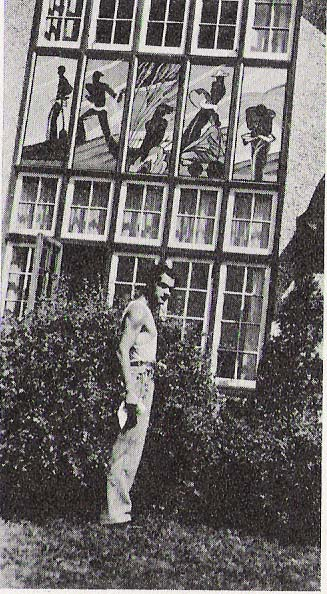
Working in stained windows for Frank Lloyd Wright, 1933

=== Madonna dilemma ===
Martinez, who was an avid historian and protector of the Colombian artistic heritage, discovered a painting by Raphael de Urbino. This discovery started a debate among Colombian scholars that is now referred to as "The dilemma of (La Madonna de Bogotá) (Spanish: Lio de la Madona). Martinez Delgado managed to prove the provenance of the piece along with its authenticity with the use of X-rays and detailed forensic work. In 1939, he took the painting to New York City during the 1939 World's Fair, where experts from the Metropolitan Museum, the Chicago Art Institute and the Louvre examined the painting. Among the experts were: Daniel Catton, Rich A. Sweet, Ruber H. Clark, Leo A. Marzolo, Adolfo Venturi and Wilhelm Valentiner. They all concurred with Master Martinez and confirmed its authenticity. The painting was included in the artist's catalog as the "Madonna of Bogotá."

=== Golden years ===
In 1940, Martínez participated in the first Salón de Artistas Colombianos, where he won the Gold Medal for the oil on canvas "El que volvió"; the subsequent year, he won first prize for the oil on canvas "Interludio". (Today at the Colombian National Museum). In 1943, Martínez made his first major mural in Colombia at the school Presentación of Chapinero. In 1945, work started on the Cúcuta Cathedral stations, as well as the murals and carvings at the city's government building. That year, Martínez also illustrated the biography of Sucre, written by Carlos Arturo Caparroso (Editorial Horizontes, Bogotá), and was designated as a Member of the Historic Academy of Bogotá. In 1947, Martinez was commissioned by the Honorable Alberto Lleras Camargo, then-director of the OEA, and the Honorable Laureano Gómez, the Inter-American Conference organizer, to create the mural for the elliptic chamber of the National Congress Building. He finished the fresco in time for the Inter American conference. General George Marshall of the US called the piece a wonder of contemporary art, and was relieved that the capital was spared from the fires during the Bogotazo. Martinez was given the Cruz de Boyacá award by President Mariano Ospina Pérez. Martinez also became the premier historian on Simón Bolívar and his army during the 1940s and 1950s. His limited edition Iconography on Bolivar is considered the most accurate work on the image and resalable of Simón Bolívar.

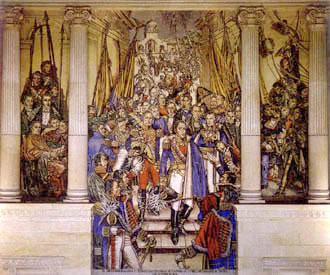
Mural by Santiago Martinez Delgado in the Colombian Congress.

=== Early death ===
In 1948, Martínez founded a commercial art studio. In the following years, he made various well-recognized brand logos, illustrations, history books, and over 30 majestic murals in addition to many of his best-known paintings. During this period, he wrote and directed the dramatization of radio scripts, such as "El Virrey Solis", that broke all the ratings records for that year. Martínez also made plays, including "Estampas místicas de la tierra del Señor", "Juan Manuel el Gavilán" (unedited) and "El derecho de nacer". In 1953, he was commissioned by Nelson Rockefeller to paint an oil on canvas of 8 x 4 meters (the largest Oil on Canvas in South America) for the Bank of New York in Bogotá, but he died before finishing it. It was placed on the bank, where it remains today as the largest oil on canvas in Colombia. Rockefeller, in a speech during the presentation of the painting to the public, called Martinez Delgado "the greatest Latin American artist of the decade". (Today, the building is the Interior Ministry Building, and City Bank donated the painting to the Colombian Government.)

Martinez died on January 12, 1954, in the hacienda "El Molino", of a stroke. On August 3 of the same year, the National Museum, with the collaboration of the Education Ministry, organized an exhibition in his honor.

== Listing of selected works ==
Martinez produced over 100 paintings in his career, in addition to murals, produced illustrations for books, lithographs, a great number of drawings, dozens of sculptures, and various other projects, including a large number of books and published articles, before passing at the age of 47. The list below has some of his most significant works.

=== Murals ===
- A century of Colombian evolution – 1933 3rd Pavilion Chicago World Fair - Chicago.
- Columns GE pavilion – 1933 General Electric Pavilion Chicago World Fair - Chicago.
- Bolivar and Santander in the Cucuta Congress – Elliptic Room of the National Congress - Bogotá.
- Ceiling fresco in the San Carlos Palace – Old presidential home, current foreign ministry - Bogotá.
- Fresco of Bavaria Building - Hall of the lobby old Bavaria Building - Bogotá.
- Building Caja Colombiana de Ahorros - Banco Santander - Bogotá.
- Cid Campeador – Cid Theater - Bogotá.
- El hombre - Theater Colombia - Bogotá.
- Room Hotel Granada (Missing)- Bogotá.
- Windmills of Quixote – Walls of café El Molino - Bogotá.
- Rooms Club Campestre - Club Campestre de Medellín - Medellín.
- El Trabajador - Banco Comercial Antioqueño - Medellín.
- Sin Titulo - Banco de Colombia - Medellín.
- Los Proceres - Banco de Colombia - Cúcuta
- Episodes of Santander's Life – National Palace of Cúcuta - Cúcuta.
- Madono of el Molino - Hacienda el Molino - Madrid, Colombia

=== Sculpture ===
- Rock face at the front of the National Palace in Cúcuta - Cucuta
- The Carving Collection made at Taliesin - Private Collection - USA
- The head of John the Baptist - National Museum - Bogotá
- Carvings at the Polytechnic School - Bogotá

=== Paintings/various media ===
- Bolívar (Charcoal) - Private Collection
- Mío Cristo del Monte - Private Collection
- The stories of Grim - Private Collection
- An Afternoon at the Hacienda - Private Collection
- Conchita Cintrón - Private Collection
- Head of Girl - Private Collection
- Illustrations for Vida - over 300 - ?
- Door Church of San Francisco - ?

=== Oil on Canvas ===
- Interludio - Museo Nacional - Bogotá
- El que volvio - Private Collection
- Retrato de José María Cordovez Moure - Acadeima de Historia - Bogotá
- Gold Diggers - Private Collection
- Don Quixote de la Mancha - Private Collection
- The rice of Jesus in the Cross - Cucuta Cathedral - Cucuta
- Jesus meets with the Virgin Mery - Cucuta Cathedral - Cucuta

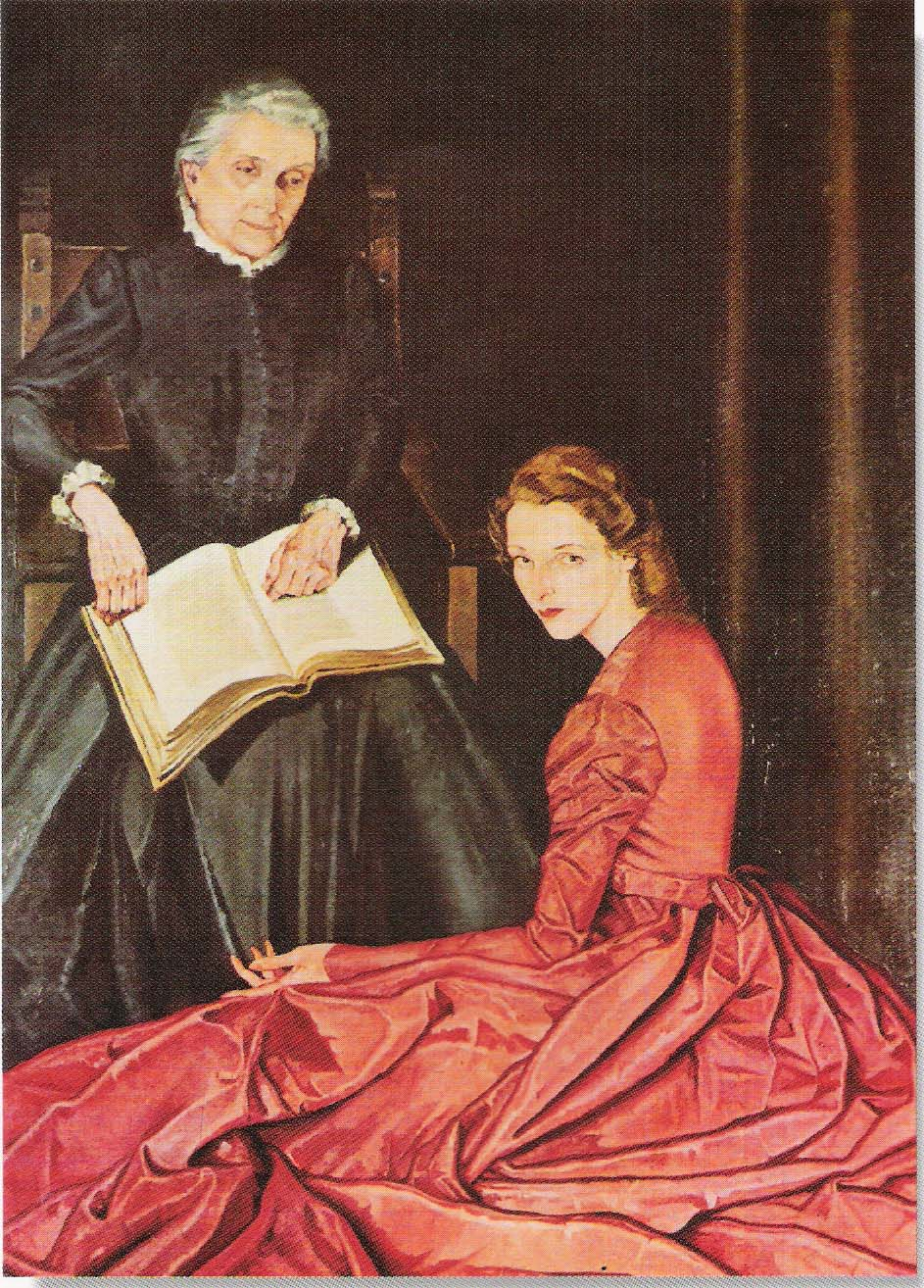
Interludio, Painting of Artist mother and wife.

- Jesus and Pilates - Cucuta Cathedral - Cucuta
- Agony of Jesus - Cucuta Cathedral - Cucuta
- Jesus carrying the Cross - Cucuta Cathedral - Cucuta
- Natural resources of Colombia - Interior Ministry Building - Bogotá

=== Watercolors ===
- Luisita Kling Fernández - Private Collection
- Amanecida - Private Collection
- Castle of San Felipe of Barajas - Private Collection
- Afternoon in La Mancha - Private Collection
- El Picador - Private Collection
- Potranca - Private Collection
- María Cecilia Aparicio Concha - Private Collection
- Interior - Private Collection
- Notes of Cartagena - Gun Club - Bogotá
- Walls of Cartagena - Gun Club Bogotá
- Quixote - Private Collection
- Sancho Panza - Private Collection
- Sketch for the fresco of the Salón Elíptico - Private Collection
- Flight of the Ducks - Private Collection
- Head of Quixote - Private Collection
- Thinking Girl - Private Collection
- Hunting Trophy - Private Collection

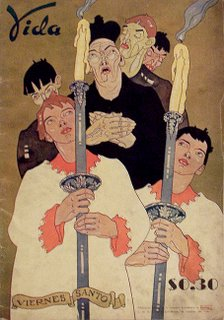
Illustration by Santiago Martinez Delgado.

- Sad Girl - Private Collection
- Head of Jesus - Private Collection
- Marina - Private Collection
- Procession - Private Collection
- Construction - Private Collection
- Mariscal Suere - Private Collection
- Home of Virrey Sámano - Private Collection
- Callejas of Santafé - Private Collection
- Cultural dresses of Colombia, Ecuador, Perú y Brasil - Private Collection
- Antonio José de Sucre, Mariscal de Ayacucho - Private Collection
- Bullfighters - Private Collection
- Sketch of the Fresco Molino Chapel in Cajicá - Private Collection
- The Te Flower - Private Collection

=== List of books by Martinez ===
- Title: Ensayo iconográfico del gran mariscal de Ayacucho

Author: Santiago Martinez Delgado Editorial:Bogotá : Ediciones de Santiago Martínez Delgado Year: 1945

- Title: In memoriam Belisario Caicedo González

Author: Santiago Martinez Delgado Editorial: Cali : Carvajal year: 19--

- Title: A. J. de Sucre

Author: Santiago Martinez Delgado Editorial: Bogotá : Tip. Prag Year: 1945

- Title: A propósito de don Gregorio Vásquez de Arce y Ceballos

Author: Santiago Martinez Delgado Editorial: Bogotá Vida Year: 1941

- Title: El arte y la ciencia

Author: Santiago Martinez Delgado Editorial:Bogotá Vida Year: 1942

- Title: Bolívar

Author: Santiago Martinez Delgado Editorial: Santiago Martinez Edicion numerada 100 Year: 1944

- Title: Carlos Polanco : discípulo de Zurbarán

Author: Santiago Martinez Delgado Editorial: Bogotá Vida Year:1939

- Title: La casa colombiana : decoración de interiores

Author: Santiago Martinez Delgado Editorial: Bogotá Sabado Year: 1944

- Title: El crimen de Berruecos

Author: Santiago Martinez Delgado Editorial: Bogotá Vida Year: 1942

- Title: El tigre

Author: Santiago Martinez Delgado Editorial: Bogotá Vida year:1936

- Title: Una reseña iconográfica del ejército y de las armas libertadoras

Author: Santiago Martinez Delgado Editorial: Bogotá Tipografía Praga year: 1944

== See also ==
- Art Deco
- Frank Lloyd Wright
- Gabriela Mistral
- Congress of Colombia
- Colombian Art

== Printed sources ==
- "Martinez, Delgado". Encyclopaedia de arte de Colombia. 1986.
- Pineros, Joaquin. "Santiago Martinez Delgado el Humanista": 1–70.

== Online sources ==
- Gehr, Pablo. "Santiago Martinez Delgado". Arte Colombia. Archived from the original on 2007-03-13.
