= Miguel Urrutia Art Museum =

Museo de Arte Miguel Urrutia (MAMU)
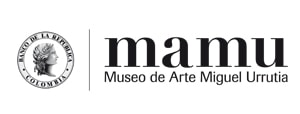

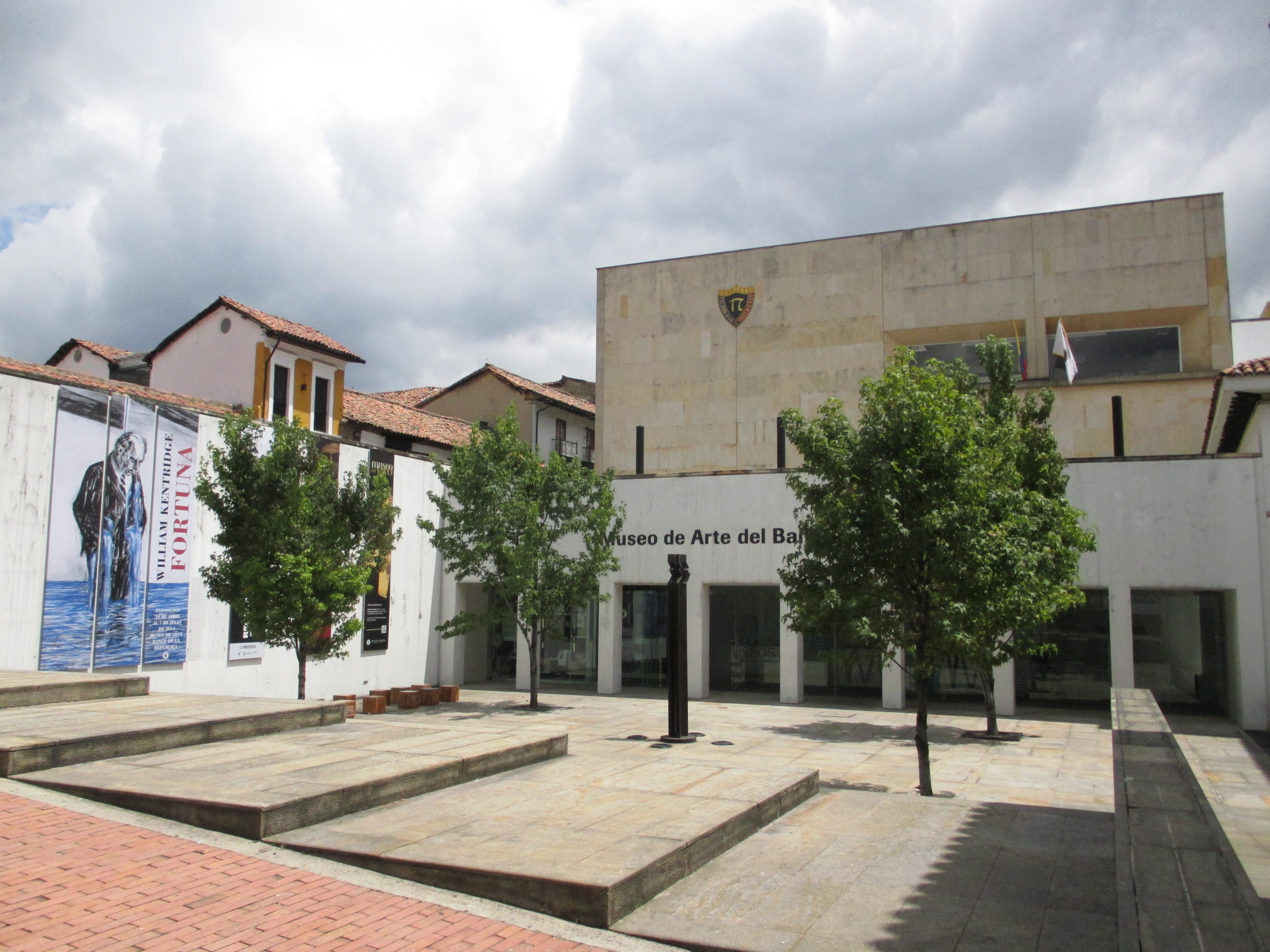
- Former name: Museo de Arte del Banco de la República (Bank of the Republic Art Museum)
- Established: 2004
- Location: Bogotá, Colombia
- Coordinates: 4°35′46″N 74°04′23″W
- Type: Art museum
- Public transit access: Museo del Oro station
- Website: official website

The Museo de Arte Miguel Urrutia (MAMU) (English: Miguel Urrutia Art Museum) is an art museum located in La Candelaria neighborhood of Bogotá, Colombia. It is managed by the Bank of the Republic of Colombia and used to display its art collection which numbered 6,222 works in 2018.

The MAMU is part of the Banrepcultural Network along with the Museo Botero, the Gold Museum, the Luis Ángel Arango Library, and the Museo Casa de Moneda.

== History ==
The art collection of the Banco de la República, the central bank of Colombia, dates back to 1957 and it now numbers over 6,500 works, mainly of Colombian and Latin American art. The art collection is displayed across the bank's cultural network including in the Miguel Urrutia Art Museum which is the largest venue for exhibiting visual arts within the network.

Established in 2004 as the Banco de la República Art Museum, the MAMU is the main art museum within the Bank of the Republic's cultural network and it's used to display the bank's art collection.

The Bank of the Republic's art collection dates back to 1957

Since 2013, the permanent exhibit has been divided in 5 different curatorial expositions: The first modern times,

In 2016, the museum changed its name from the Bank of the Republic Art Museum (Spanish: Museo de Arte del Banco de la República) to the Miguel Urrutia Art Museum as an homage to Colombian economist and academic Miguel Urrutia Montoya.

== Collection ==
The MAMU, alongside the Botero Museum, houses the Bank of the Republic Art Collection. Since 2013, the museum displays over 800 works of art in five curatorial departments.

=== First modern times (XVI–XVIII century) ===
Artists within this colonial-era include works by Antonio Acero de la Cruz, Angelino Medoro, Jan van Kessel the Elder, Jan Brueghel the Younger, Giovanni Francesco Maineri, Pieter Brueghel the Younger, modern artist Marina Abramović, and anonymous artists from the Quito School and the Cusco School amongst others.

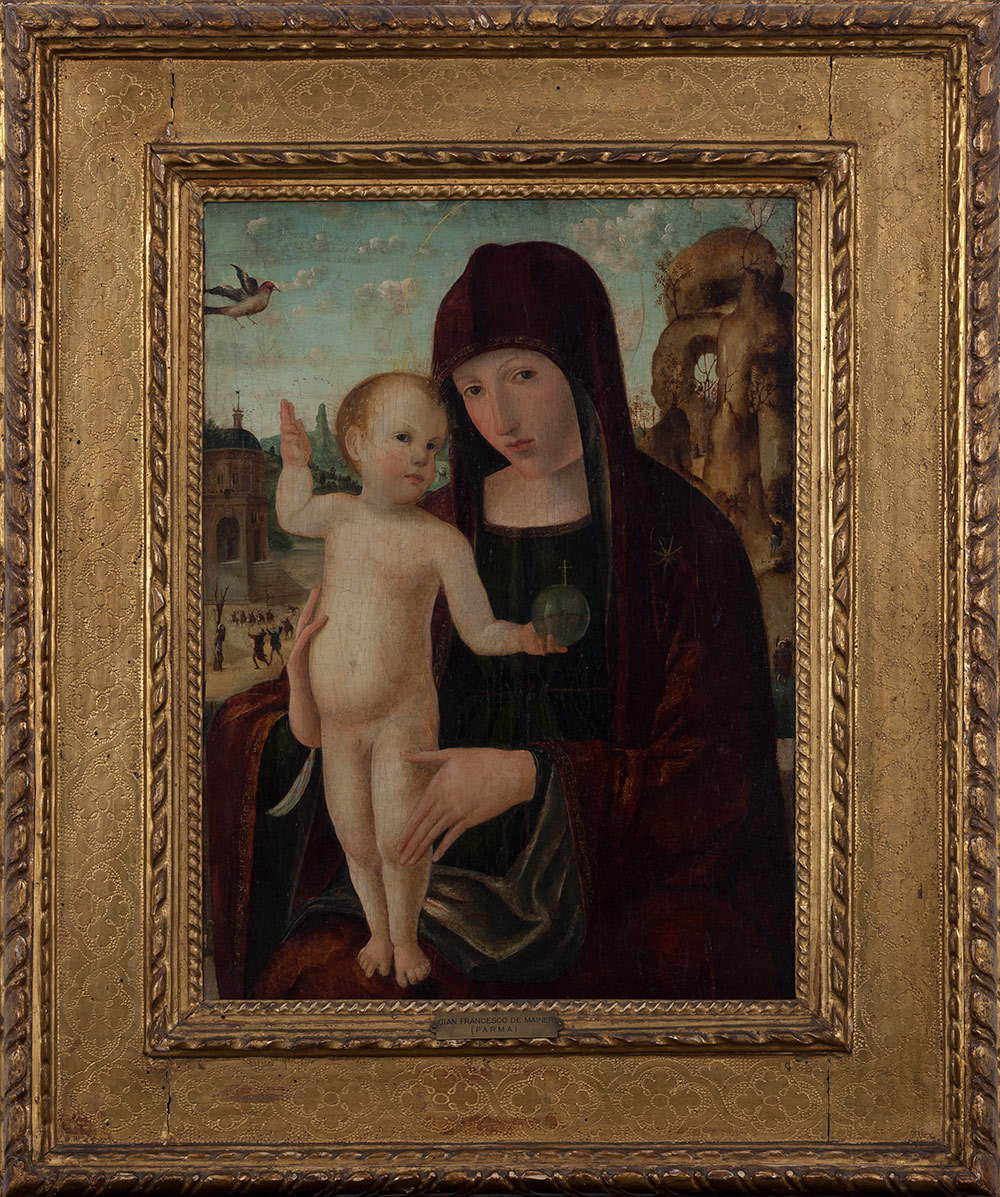
Giovanni Francesco Maineri, Madonna y niño, 1497

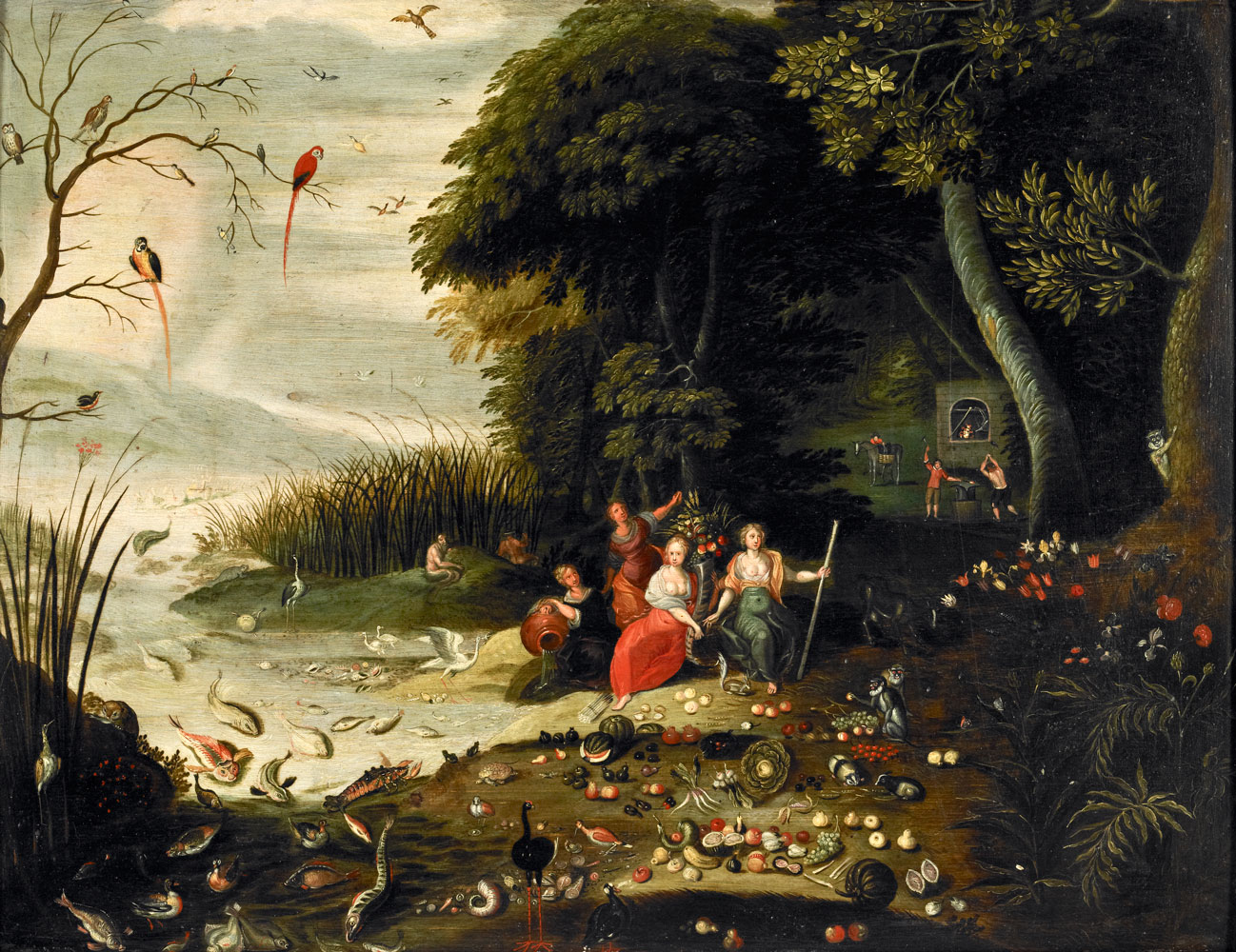
Jan van Kessel the Elder, Summer, 1640

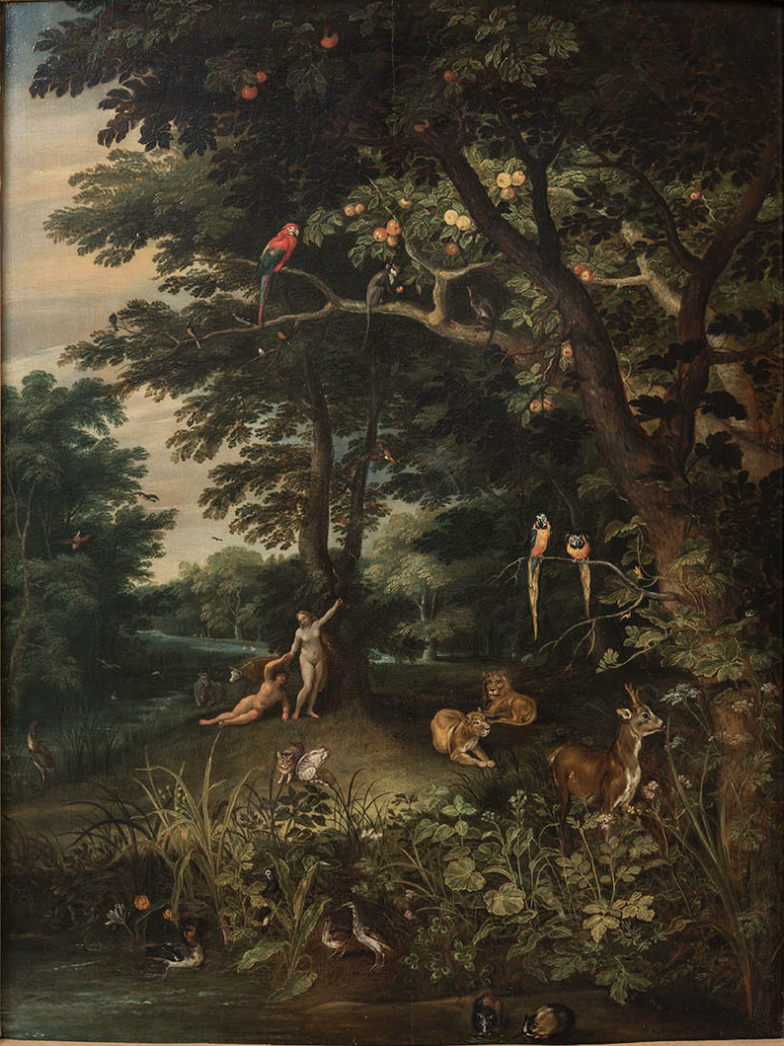
Jan Brueghel the Younger, Adam and Eve in the Garden of Eden, 17th century

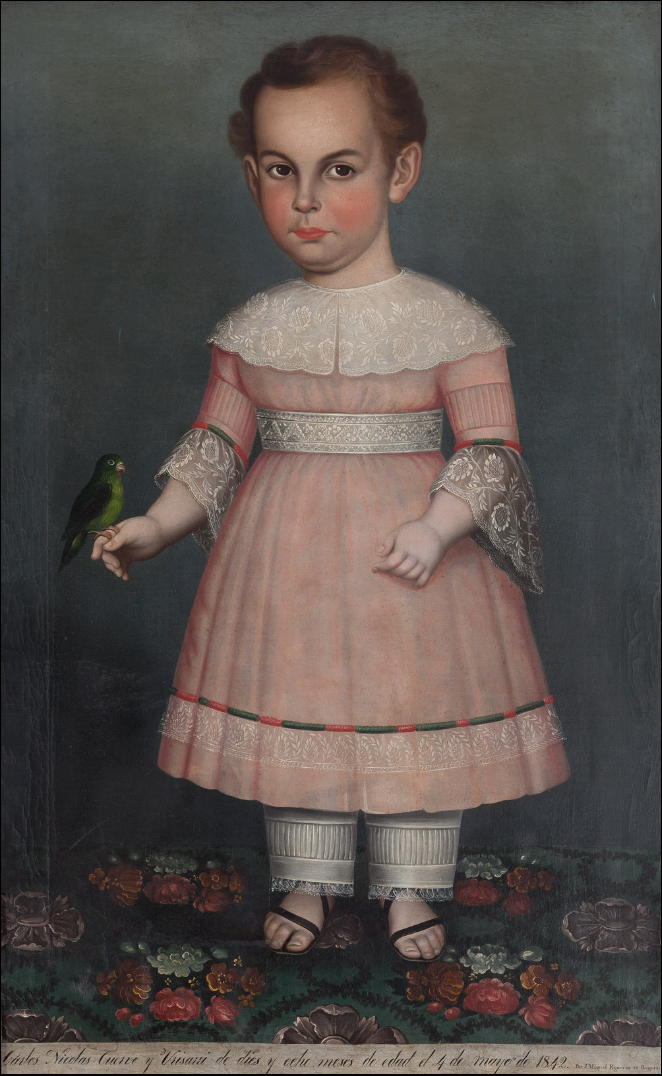
Jose Miguel Figueroa, Retrato del niño Cuervo, 1800

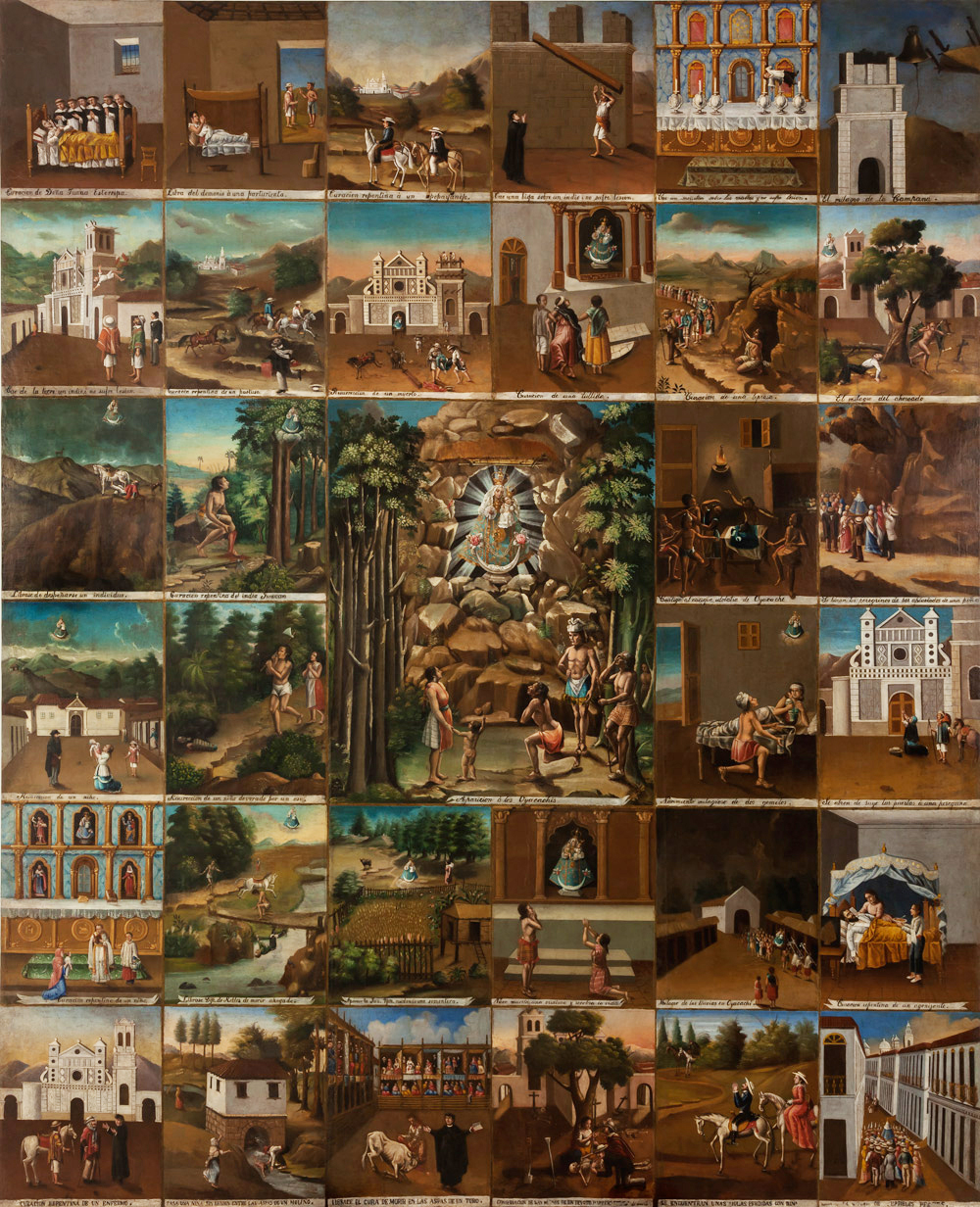
Apparition of the Virgin to the Oyacachi, unknown painter, 19th century

=== Ruptures and Continuities (XIX century) ===
Colombian artists within this curatorial era include works by Ramón Torres Méndez, Andrés de Santa María, Francisco Antonio Cano Cardona, Ricardo Acevedo Bernal, and Pedro José Figueroa amongst others.

International artists within this curatorial era include works by Chuck Close, Henry Price, Vik Muniz, François Désiré Roulin, Paul Gauguin, Jean-Baptiste-Louis Gros, and Felipe Santiago Gutiérrez amongst others.

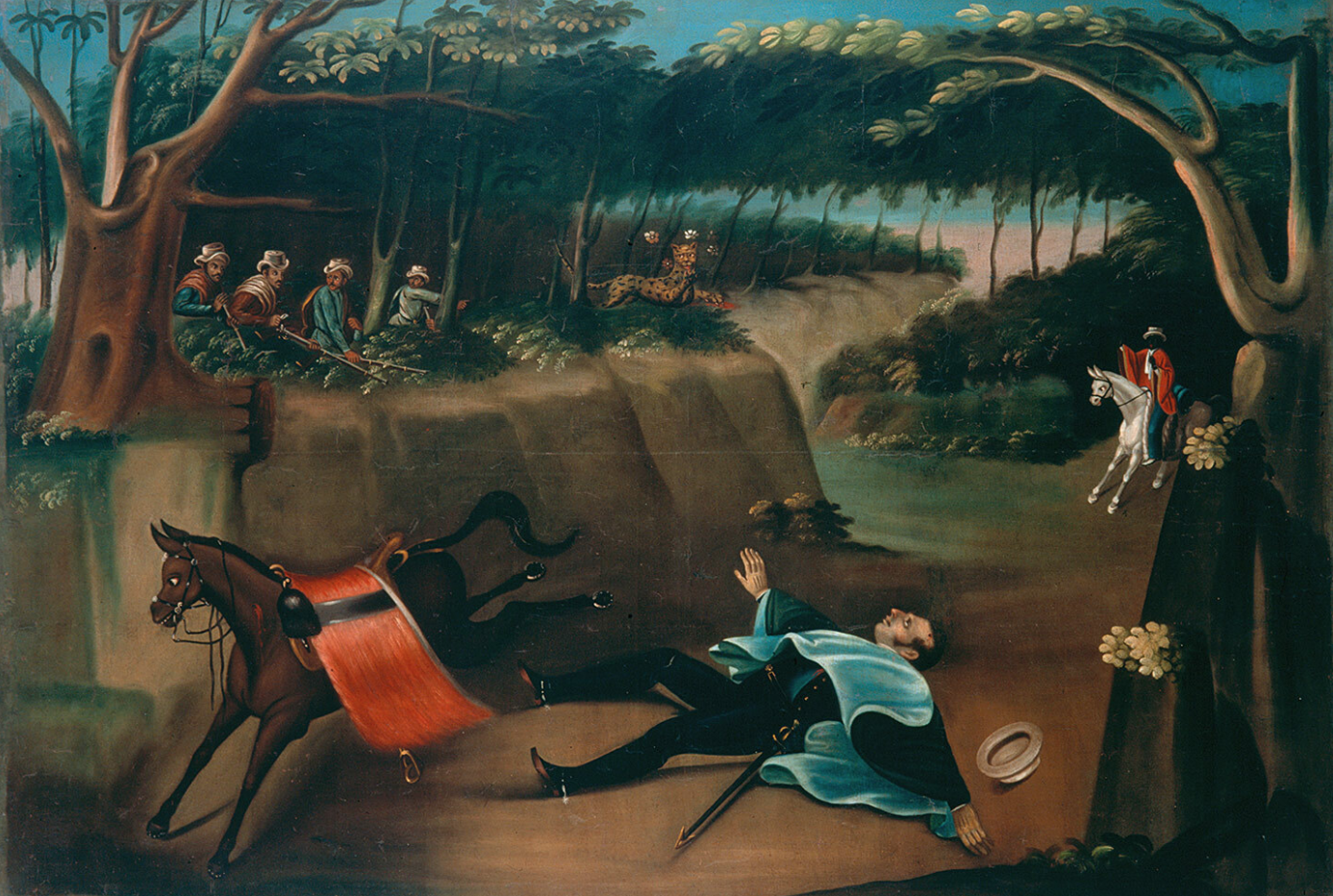
Pedro José Figueroa, the Death of Sucre, 1835

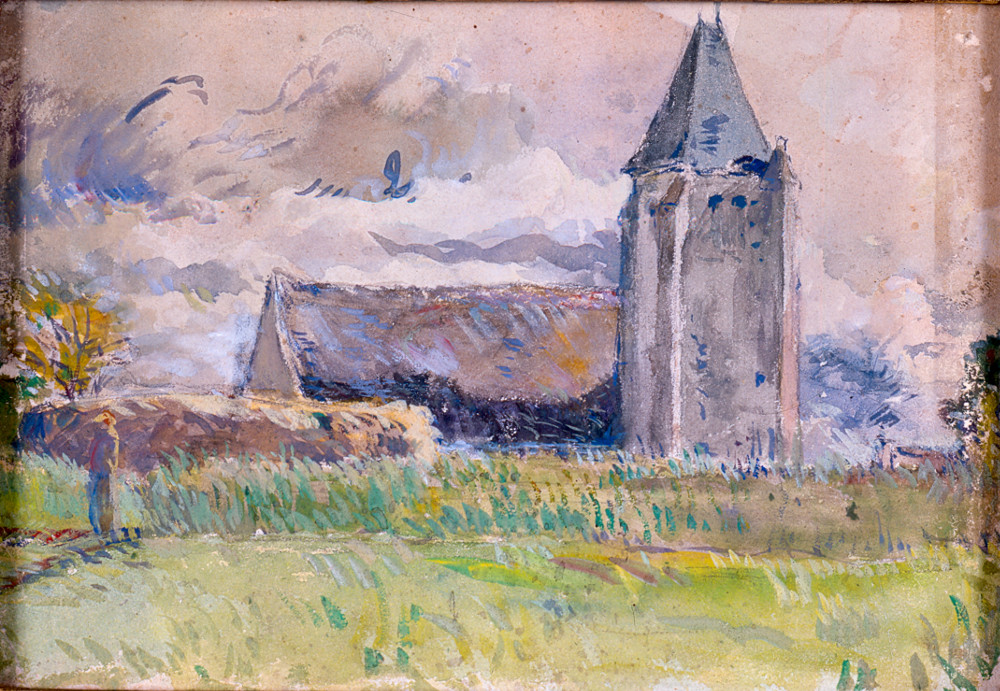
Paul Gauguin, the Eglise de Campagne, 1875

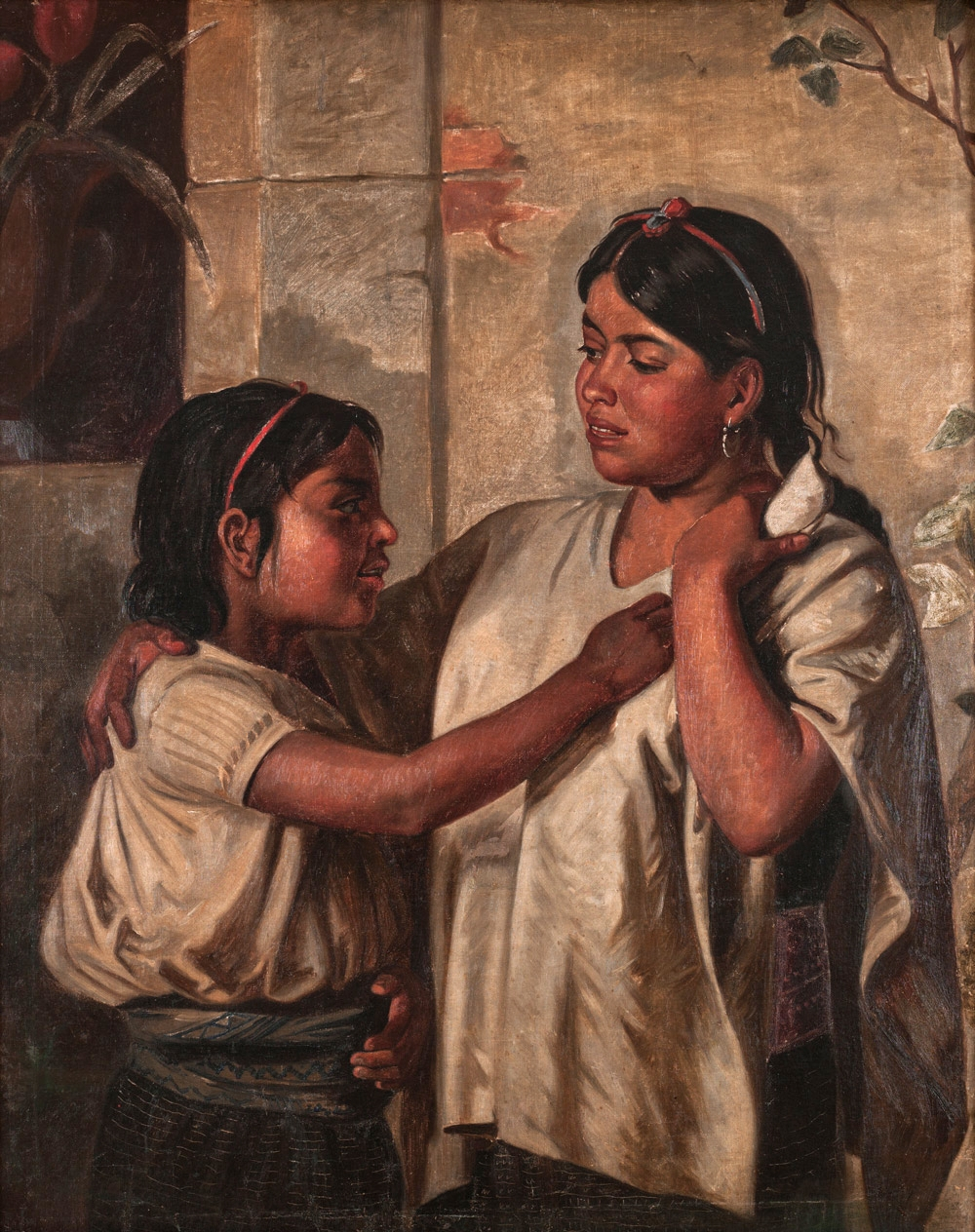
Felipe Santiago Gutiérrez, Indias de Oaxaca, 1877

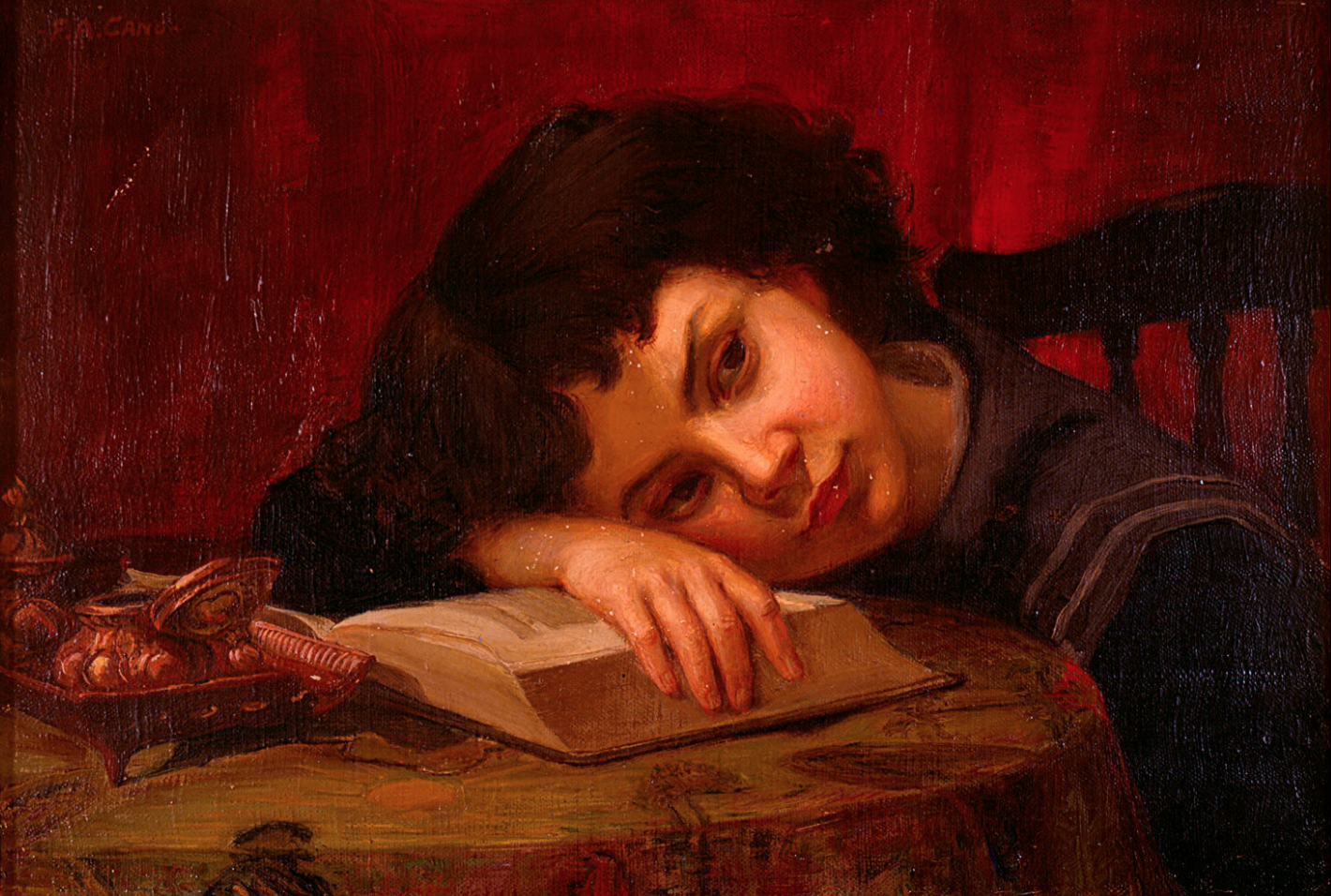
Francisco Antonio Cano Cardona, Retrato de niño, 1916

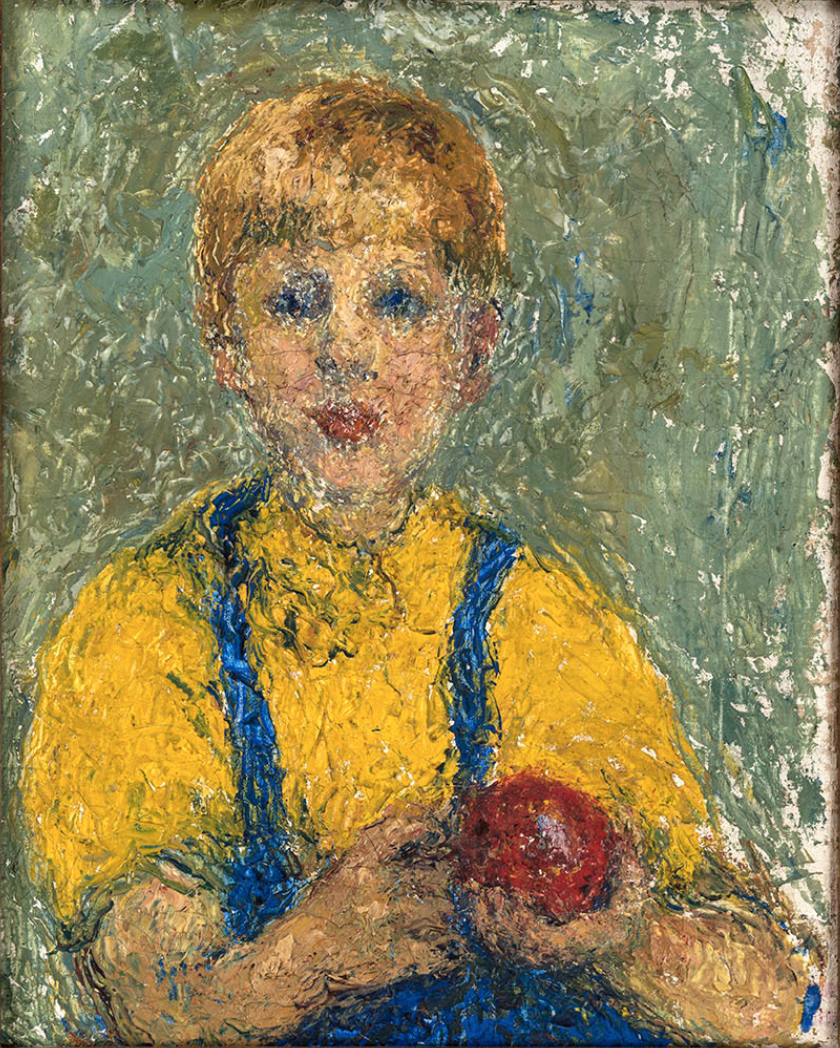
Andrés de Santa María, Retrato de Jaime, 1929

=== La Renovación Vanguardista (1910–1950) ===
Colombian artists within this curatorial era include works by Josefina Albarracín, Rómulo Rozo, Ignacio Gómez Jaramillo, Francisco Antonio Cano Cardona, Sergio Trujillo Magnenat, Marco Tobón Mejía, Andrés de Santa Maria, Hena Rodríguez, Marco Tobón Mejía, Eladio Vélez, and Pedro Nel Gómez amongst others.

International artists within this curatorial era include works by Rafael Barradas, Pedro Figari, Joaquín Torres-García, David Alfaro Siqueiros, and Armando Reverón amongst others.

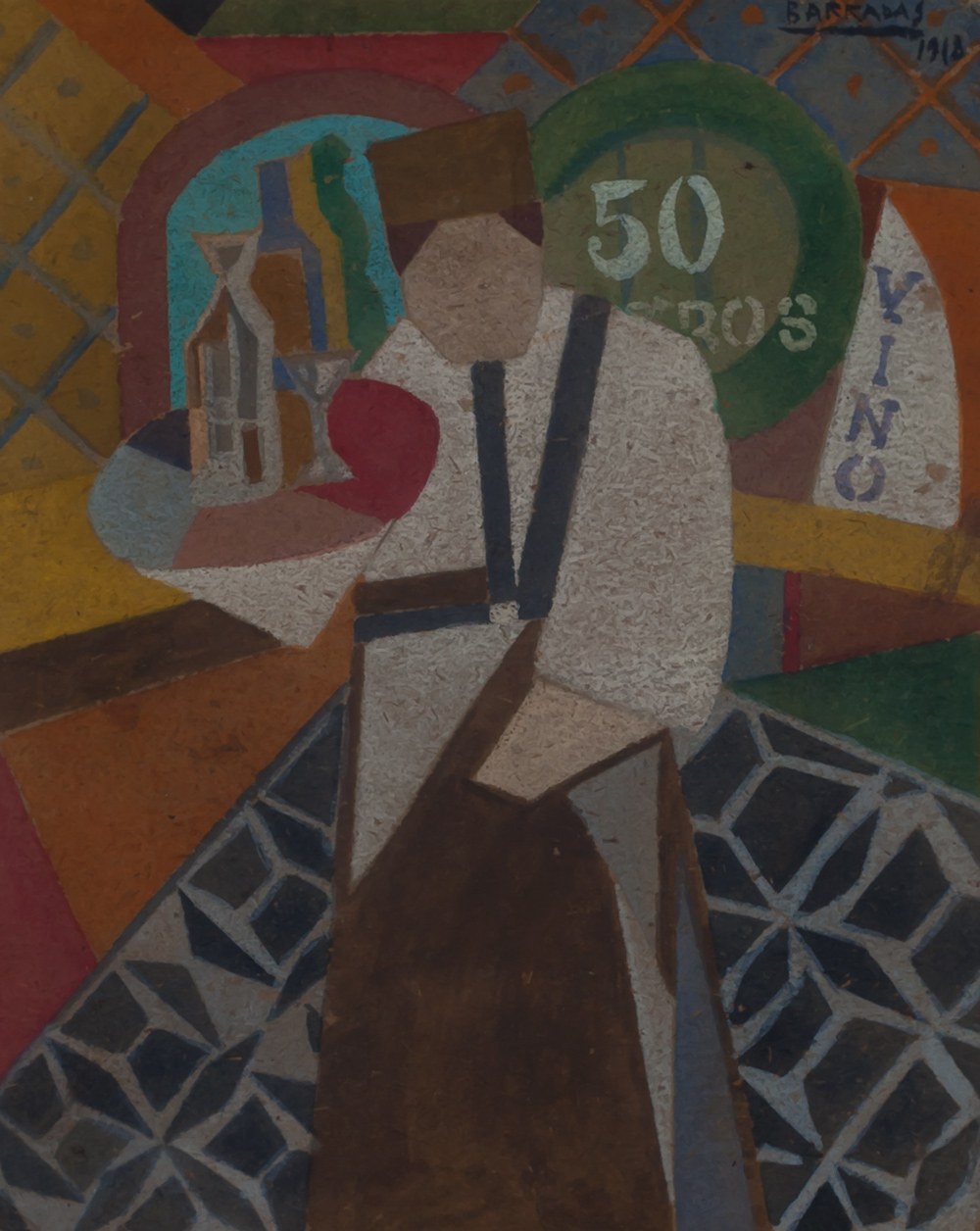
Rafael Barradas, Camarero, 1918

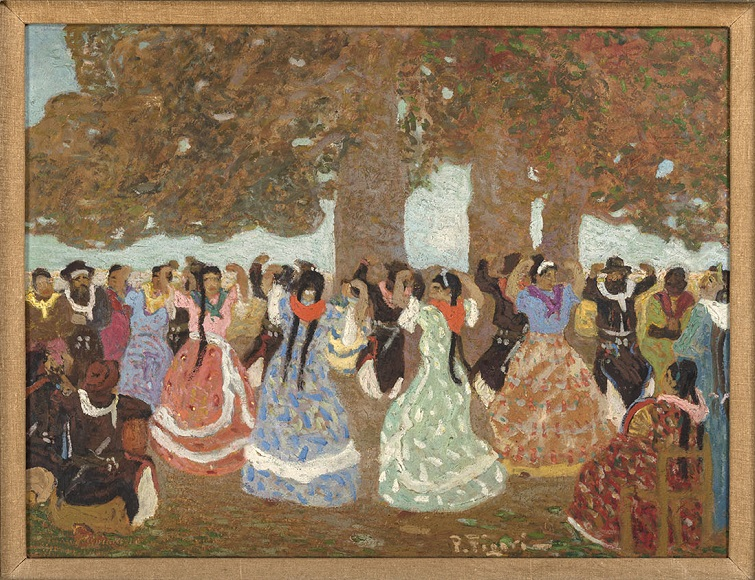
Pedro Figari, Figuras bailando, 1921

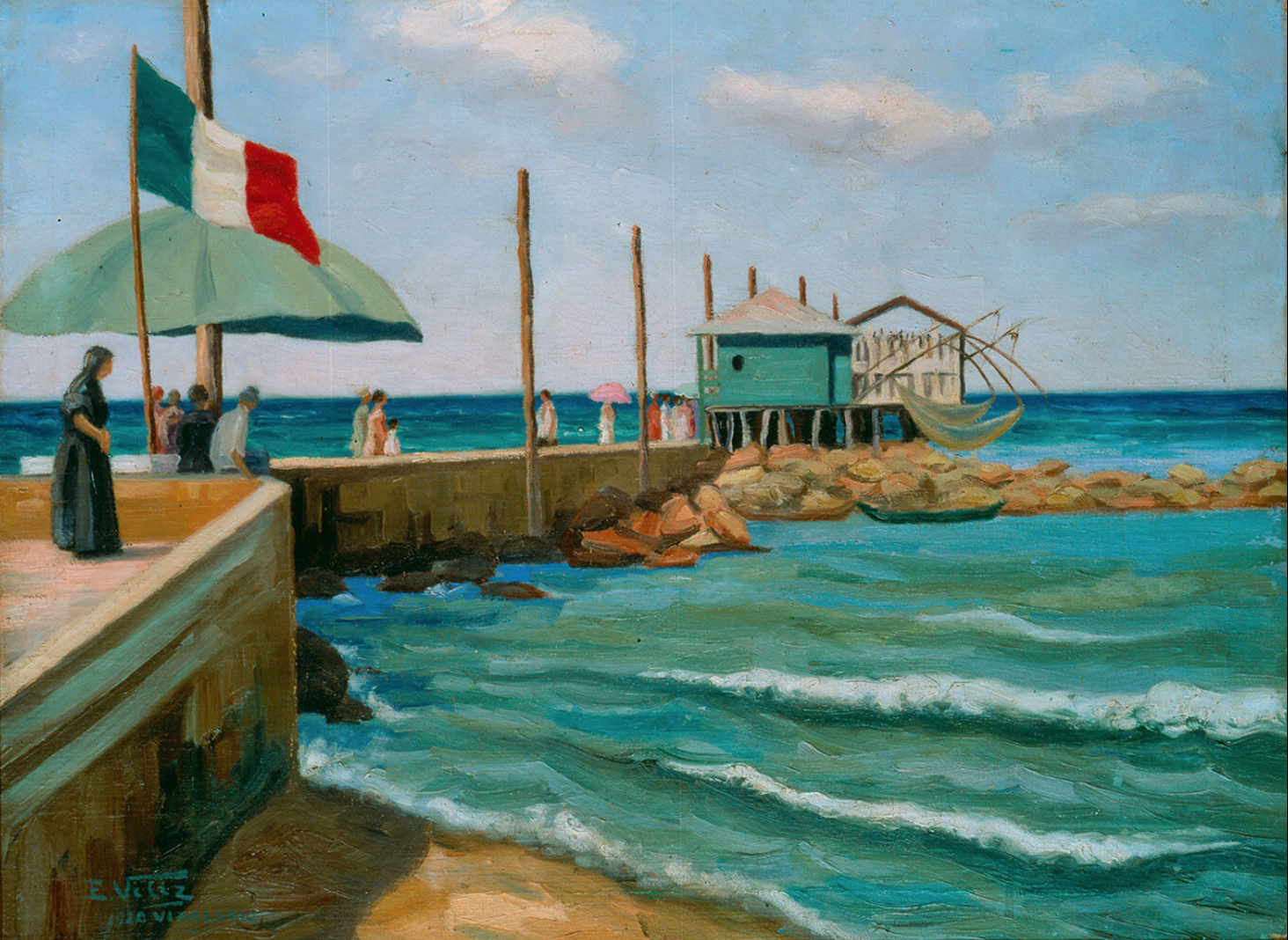
Eladio Vélez, Marina de Viareggio, 1928

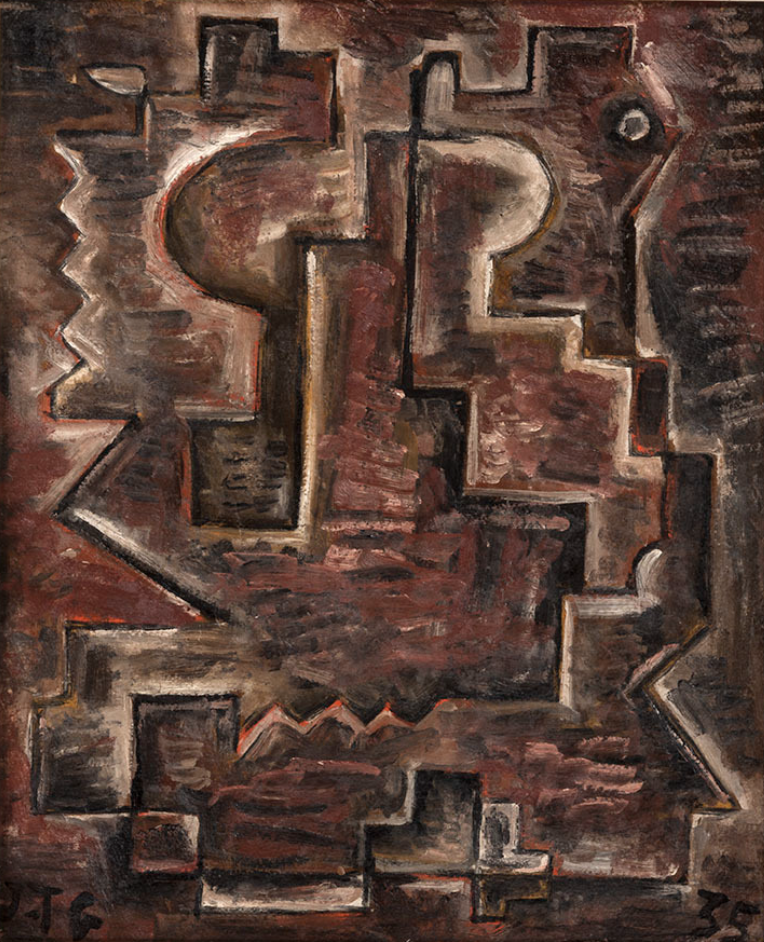
Joaquín Torres-García, Composición II, 1935

=== Classics, Experimentals, and Radicals (1950–1980) ===
Colombian artists within this curatorial era include Fernando Botero, Alejandro Obregón, Feliza Bursztyn, Miguel Ángel Rojas, Antonio Caro, Eduardo Ramírez Villamizar, Álvaro Barrios, Omar Rayo, Beatriz Gonzalez, Édgar Negret, Fanny Sanín, Enrique Grau, Miguel Ángel Rojas, Olga de Amaral, Lucy Tejada, Oscar Muñoz, and Ana Mercedes Hoyos amongst others.

International artists within this curatorial era include René Portocarrero, Francisco Toledo, Carlos Cruz-Diez, Rufino Tamayo, Jesús Rafael Soto, Rogelio Polesello, David Alfaro Siqueiros, Julio Le Parc, José Luis Cuevas, Fernando de Szyszlo, Vicente Rojo Almazán, Julio Alpuy, and Louise Nevelson amongst others.

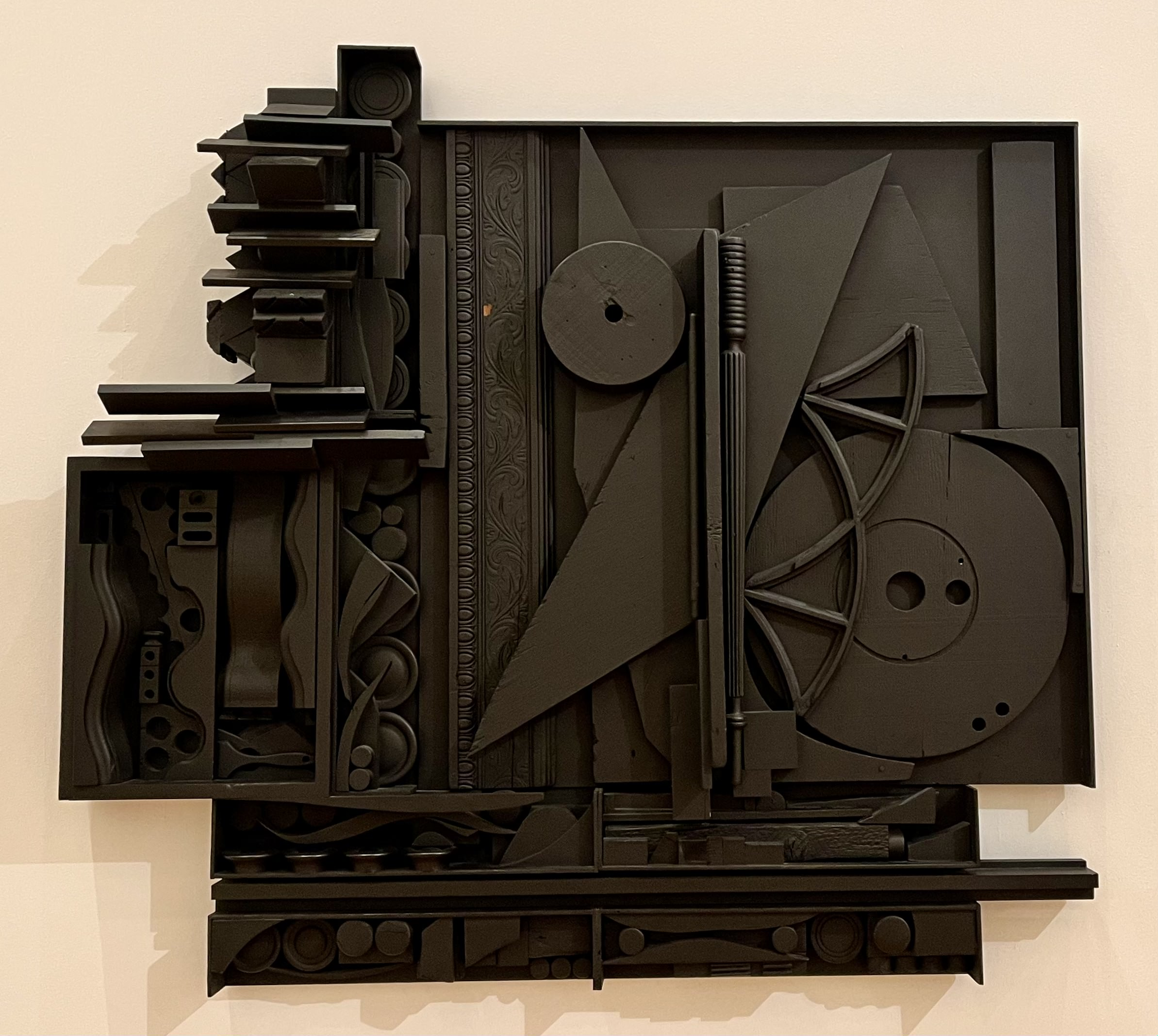
Louise Nevelson, Rain Garden Zag II, 1977

=== Three decades of art in expansion (1980 to today) ===
Colombian artists within this curatorial era include works by Doris Salcedo, Oscar Muñoz, Danilo Dueñas, Feliza Bursztyn, Juan Pablo Echeverri, Miguel Ángel Rojas, Beatriz Gonzalez, Olga de Amaral, María Fernanda Cardoso, Antonio Caro, and Álvaro Barrios amongst others.

International artists within this curatorial era include works by Ana Mendieta, Marta Minujín, Los Carpinteros, Cildo Meireles, Marco Maggi, Carlos Garaicoa, Alfredo Jaar, León Ferrari, Vik Muniz, and Gabriel Orozco amongst others.

== Selected objects ==
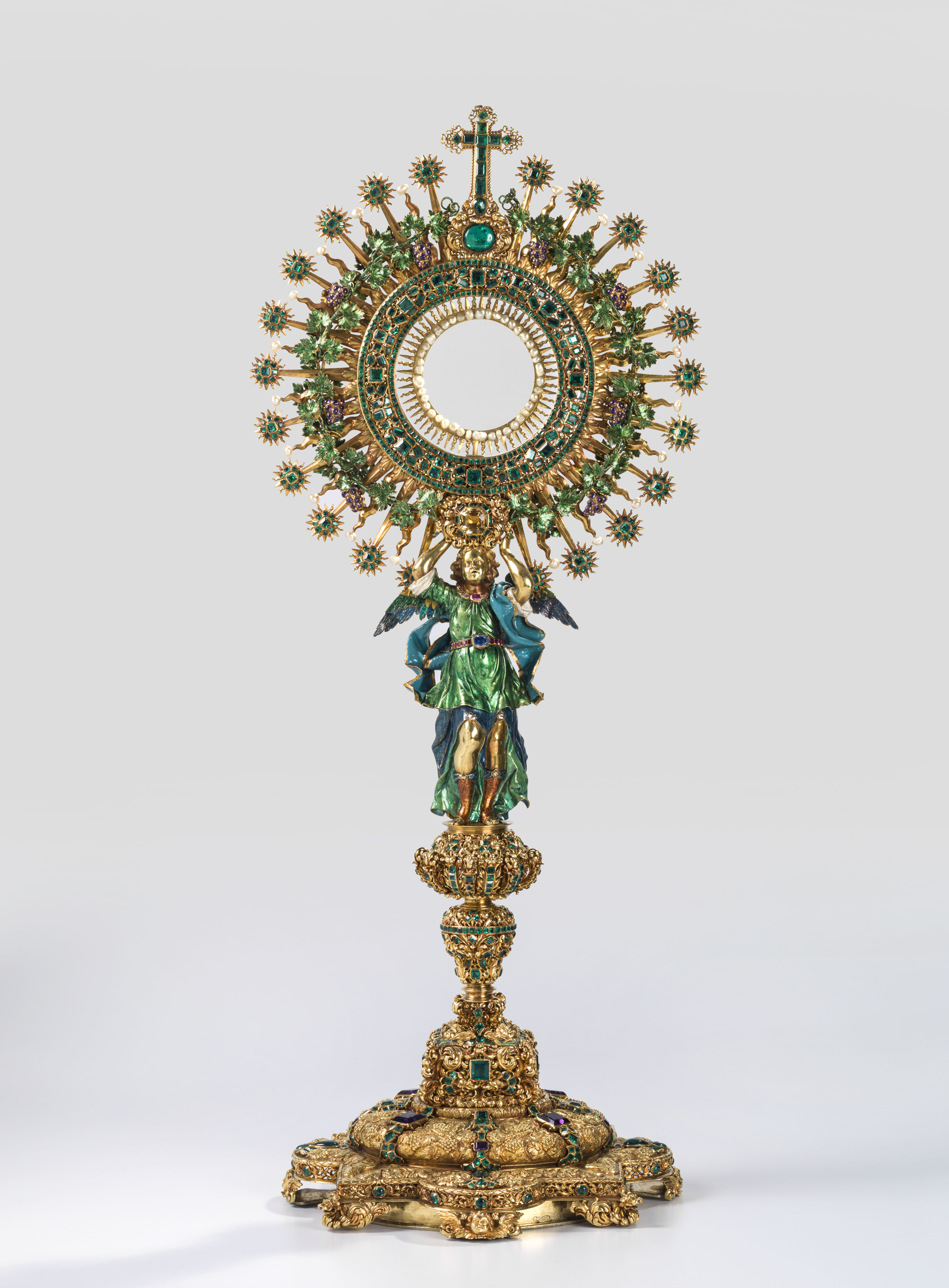
La Lechuga from 1700s

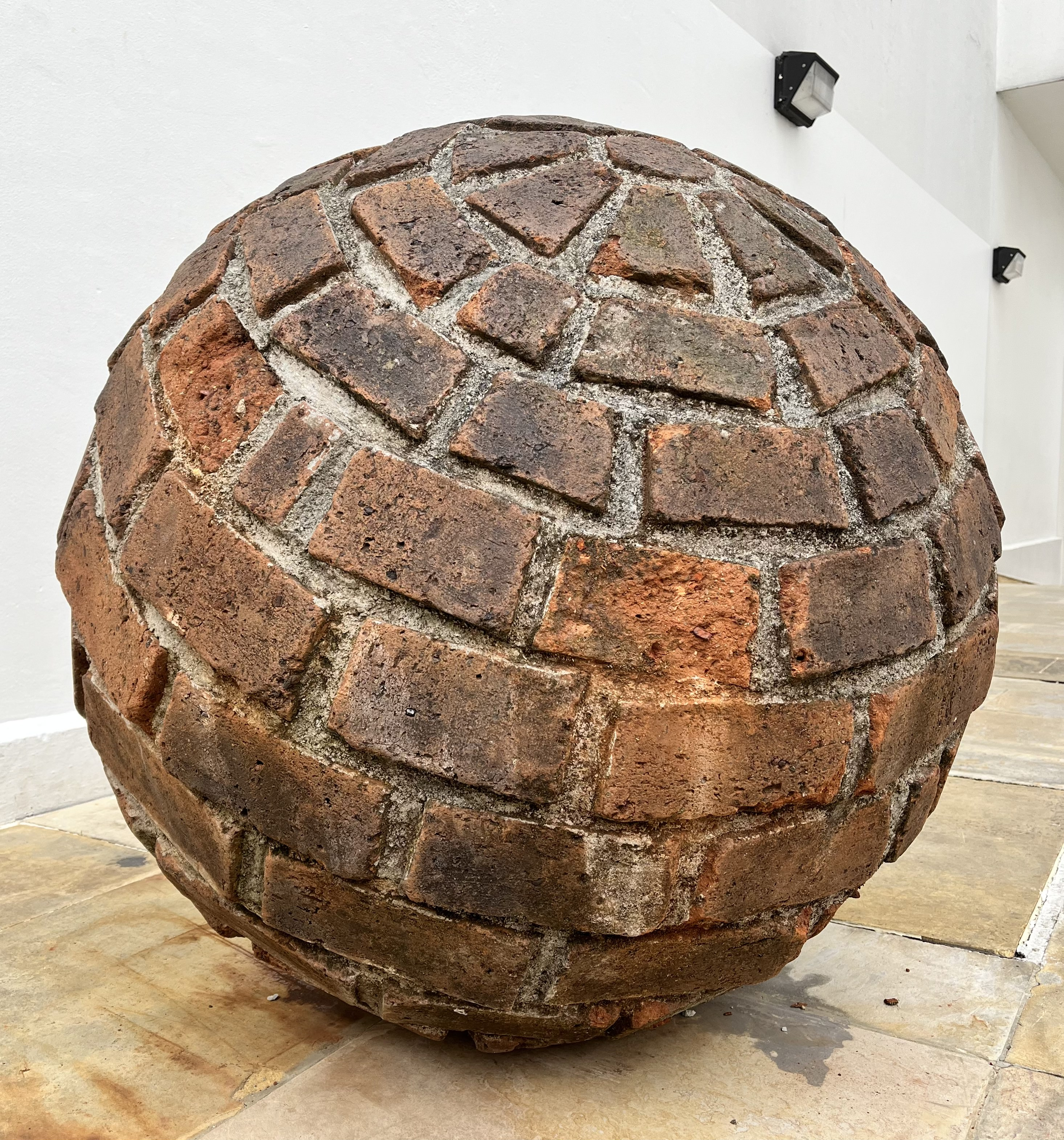
Lugares en Fuga (A) (2012) by Fredy Alzate

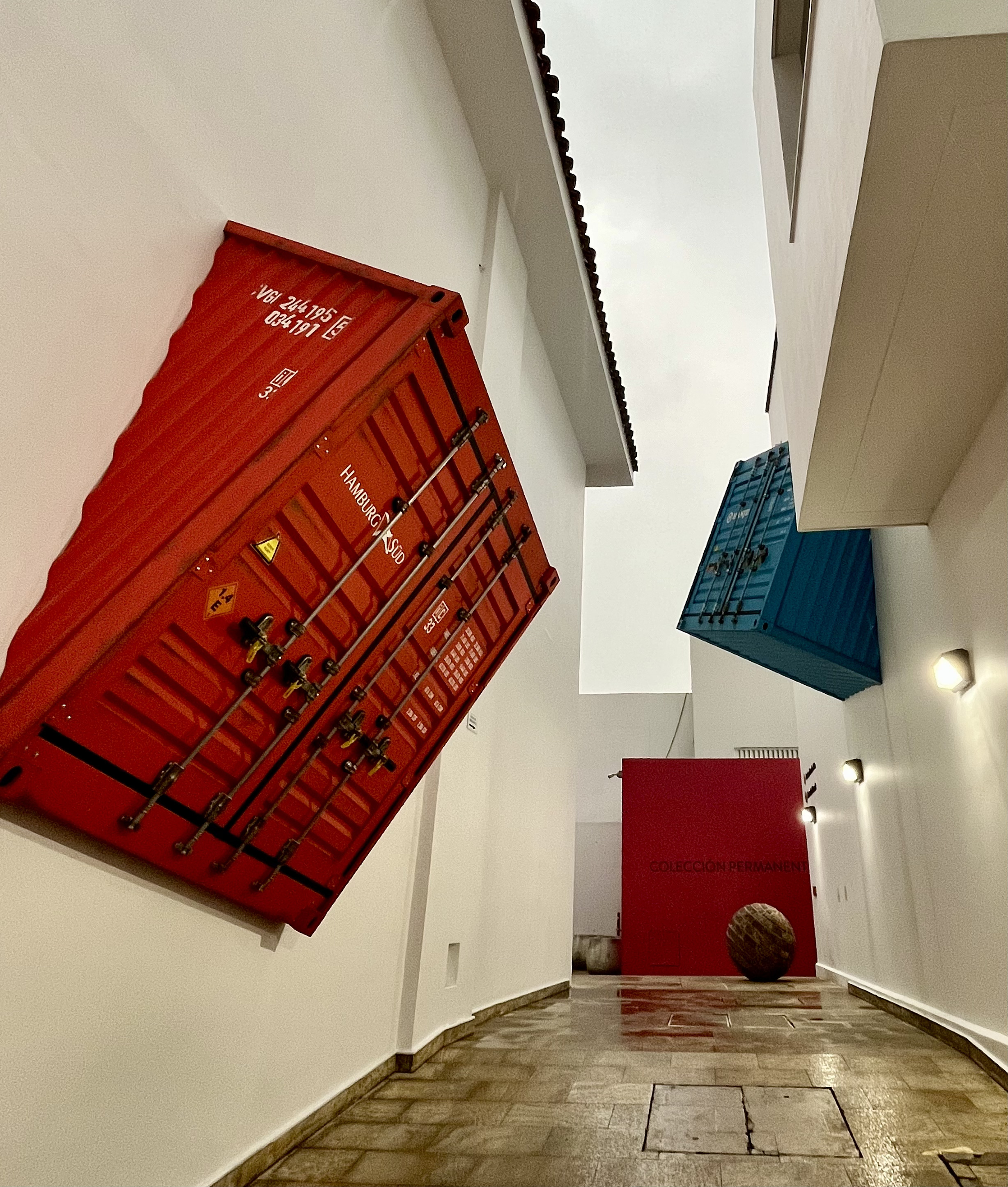
Incrustaciones (2017) by Alejandro Sánchez Suárez

== See also ==
- National Museum of Colombia
