= Apparition of the Virgin to the Oyacachi =

Painting depicting the apparitions of the Virgin to the Oyacachi people

Aparición de la Virgen a los Oyacachi
- Apparition of the Virgin to the Oyacachi (English)
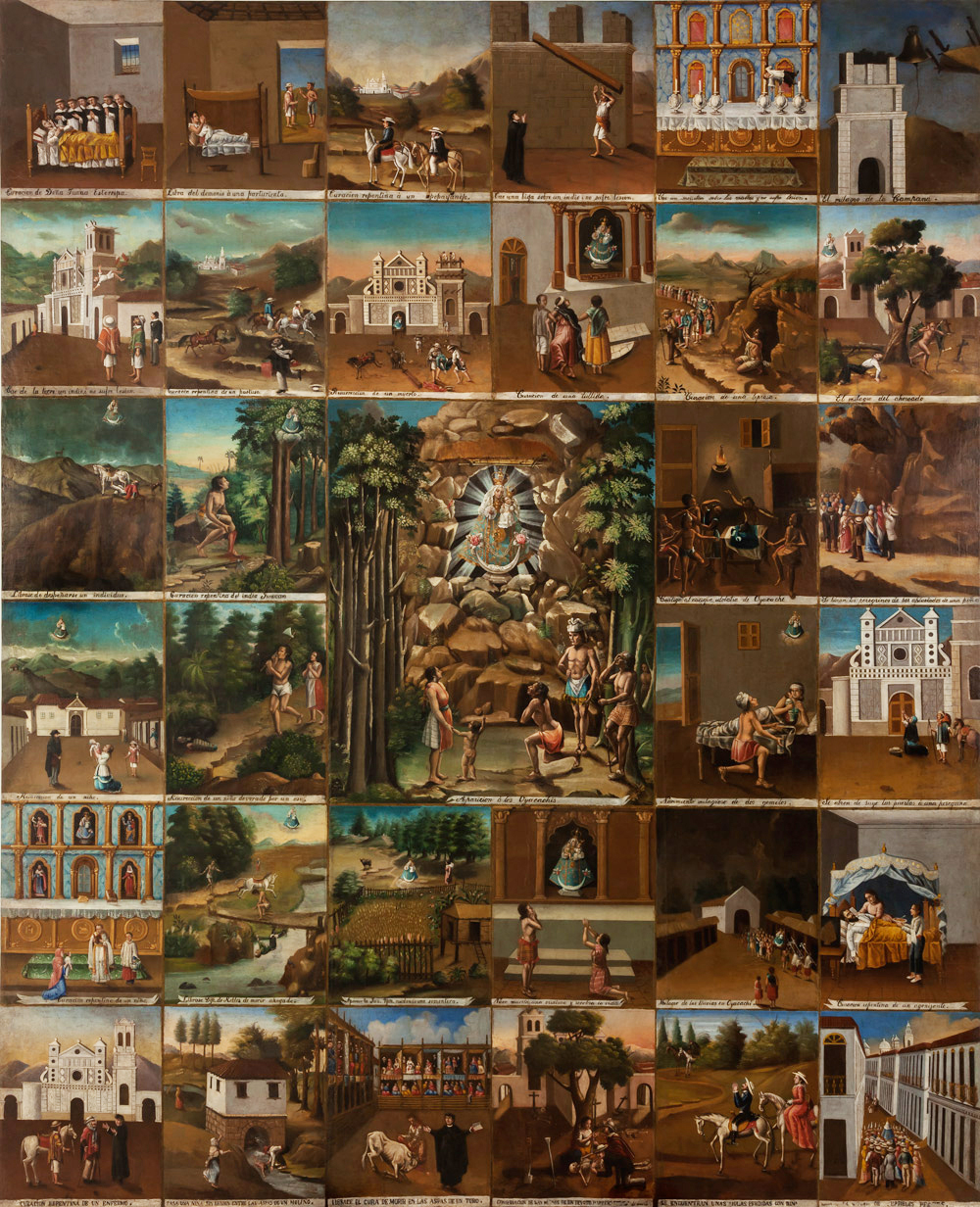
- Artist: Unknown
- Year: 19th-century
- Medium: Oil on canvas
- Movement: Naïve
- Dimensions: 252 cm × 220 cm (99 in × 87 in)
- Location: Miguel Urrutia Art Museum, Bogotá D.C.
- Owner: Banco de la República
- Accession: 30 March 2012

Aparición de la Virgen a los Oyacachi (English: Apparition of the Virgin to the Oyacachi) is an oil-on-canvas painting by an unknown artist, created in the 1800s. It is held in the collection of the Bank of the Republic and exhibited at the Miguel Urrutia Art Museum, in Bogotá.

The painting depicts the devotion to Our Lady of Oyacachi across 33 different scenes. The Virgin portrayed in the work is renowned for the miracles and apparitions that have been commemorated for centuries through pilgrimages to the sanctuary in the parish of El Quinche, Quito Canton, Ecuador. The distinct scenes depict extraordinary events that demonstrate the Virgin's graces and favors to the people of El Quinche.

The painting was accessioned by the Banco de la República Art Collection in 2012 in an unstable state and poor condition and subsequently underwent restoration at the Miguel Urrutia Art Museum (MAMU) where it is now permanently displayed.

== Scenes ==
Scene	Description
	Curación de Doña Juana Esterripa; Freedom (also known as Columbia) as Bellona, is directly below George Washington. The scene depicts a woman fighting for liberty with a raised sword, a cape, and a helmet and shield (in the colors of the U.S. flag) trampling figures representing Tyranny and Kingly Power. To Freedom's left assisting her is a fierce bald eagle (the national bird of the United States) as the Eagle of Zeus, carrying arrows and a thunderbolt (reminiscent of the arrows carried by the eagle in the Great Seal of the United States).
	Science; Minerva, the Roman goddess of crafts and wisdom, is portrayed with helmet and spear pointing to an electrical generator creating power stored in batteries next to a printing press, representing great American inventions. American scientists and inventors Benjamin Franklin, Samuel F. B. Morse, and Robert Fulton watch. In the left part of the scene a teacher demonstrates the use of dividers.
	Marine; This scene shows Neptune, the Roman sea-god, with trident and crown of seaweed riding in a shell chariot drawn by sea horses. Venus, goddess of love born from the sea, is depicted helping to lay the transatlantic telegraph cable which ran from North America to the Telegraph Field in Ireland. In the background is an ironclad warship with smokestacks.
	Commerce; Mercury, the Roman god of commerce, with his winged petasos and sandals and a caduceus, is depicted giving a bag of gold to American Revolutionary War financier Robert Morris. To the left, men move a box on a dolly; on the right, the anchor and sailors lead into "Marine".
	Mechanics; Vulcan, the Roman god of fire and the forge, is depicted standing at an anvil with his foot on a cannon next to a pile of cannonballs. A steam engine is in the background. The man at the forge is thought to represent Charles Thomas, the supervisor of ironwork during the construction of the Capitol dome.
	Agriculture; Ceres, the Roman goddess of agriculture, is shown with a wreath of wheat and a cornucopia, symbol of plenty, while sitting on a McCormick mechanical reaper. The personification of Young America in a liberty cap holds the reins of the horses, while the goddess Flora gathers flowers in the foreground.
