= Adam and Eve in the Garden of Eden =

Painting by Jan Brueghel the Younger

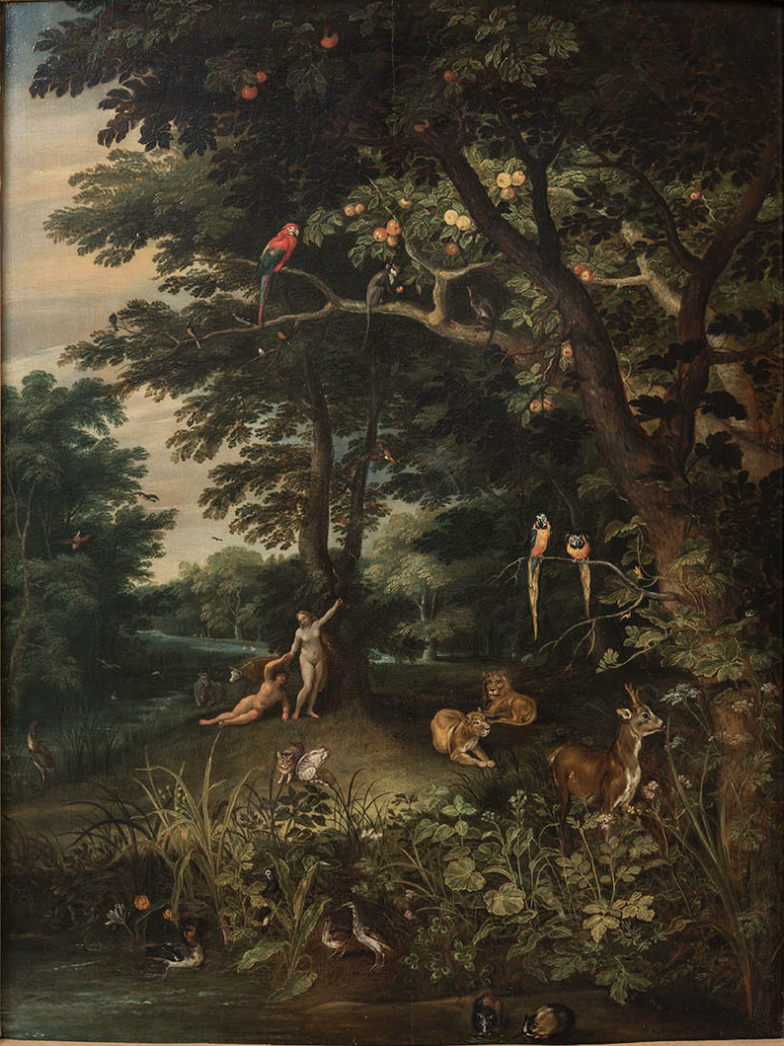
- Artist: Jan Brueghel the Younger
- Year: 17th century
- Catalogue: AP3431
- Medium: Panel painting
- Movement: Flemish Baroque
- Dimensions: 63.8 cm × 49 cm (25.1 in × 19 in)
- Location: Miguel Urrutia Art Museum, Bogotá D.C.
- Owner: Banco de la República
- Accession: 2001

Adam and Eve in the Garden of Eden (Spanish: Adán y Eva en el Jardín del Edén) is a panel painting by Flemish Baroque painter Jan Brueghel the Younger. Created in the 17th century, it is now held in the collection of the Bank of the Republic and exhibited at the Miguel Urrutia Art Museum (MAMU), in Bogotá.

== Description and interpretation ==
The painting depicts Adam and Eve in the Garden of Eden, the biblical paradise, after having consumed the forbidden apple. Both Adam and Eve appear as small figures surrounded by nature in all her exuberance. Trees, typical of Europe, are accompanied by paired animals from Africa and the New World. Observed fauna include cattle, deer, domestic cats, guinea pigs, lions, macaws, monkeys and waterfowl.

The colonization of pre-Columbian cultures was possible due to their conversion to the Catholic faith. The images of the flora and fauna of the new worlds had to be coupled with the founding myths of the Old Testament. In Adam and Eve in the Garden of Eden, New World animals such as macaws and guinea pigs, and African animals such as lions, are depicted here from the perspective of the Flemish painter in a fantasized territory between the Americas and Africa as he participates in the renewal of the exoticism of the biblical garden, the initial place of original sin and the land of the forbidden fruit.

== Historical information ==
A native of Antwerp, and the grandson of Pieter Bruegel the Elder, Jan Brueghel the Younger was sent to modern-day Italy by his father, who was also a painter, at the age of 22 to further develop his abilities as a painter. After three years, Jan Brueghel returned to Antwerp where he took over his father's workshop following his death. Around 1631 Jan Brueghel the Younger began a series of paintings on the theme of Adam and Eve, of which Adam and Eve in the Garden of Eden being one of the paintings from this series.

== Exhibitions ==
Between 24 October 2018 and 21 January 2019, the painting was exhibited at the MAMU alongside works by Guatemalan artist Regina José Galindo and Colombian artist Abel Rodríguez Muinane as a grouping of artwork that depicts the exploration of unknown territory and the interpretation of the artists after coming across new experiences and information.

Between 15 June 2022 and 1 February 2023, the painting was exhibited at the Quimbaya Gold Museum, in the city of Armenia, during the temporary exhibition Paraísos y jardines. Representaciones de la naturaleza domesticada which was held to commemorate the reopening of the museum and the Bank of the Republic's cultural center. Between 30 November 2024 and 15 June 2025, the painting was exhibited at the MAMU during the second edition of the temporary exhibit Paraisos y jardines.

== Provenance ==
Adam and Eve in the Garden of Eden was acquired by Bank of the Republic and accessioned to its art collection in 2001 under registry number AP3431. The painting has been exhibited at the bank's Miguel Urrutia Art Museum (MAMU) and at its other cultural centers across various cities in Colombia.

== Bibliography ==
- Jaramillo Agudelo, Darío. (2021). One Hundred Treasures from the Museo de Arte Miguel Urrutia. Bogotá: Banco de la República de Colombia. ISBN 978-958-664-428-0
