= La Lechuga =

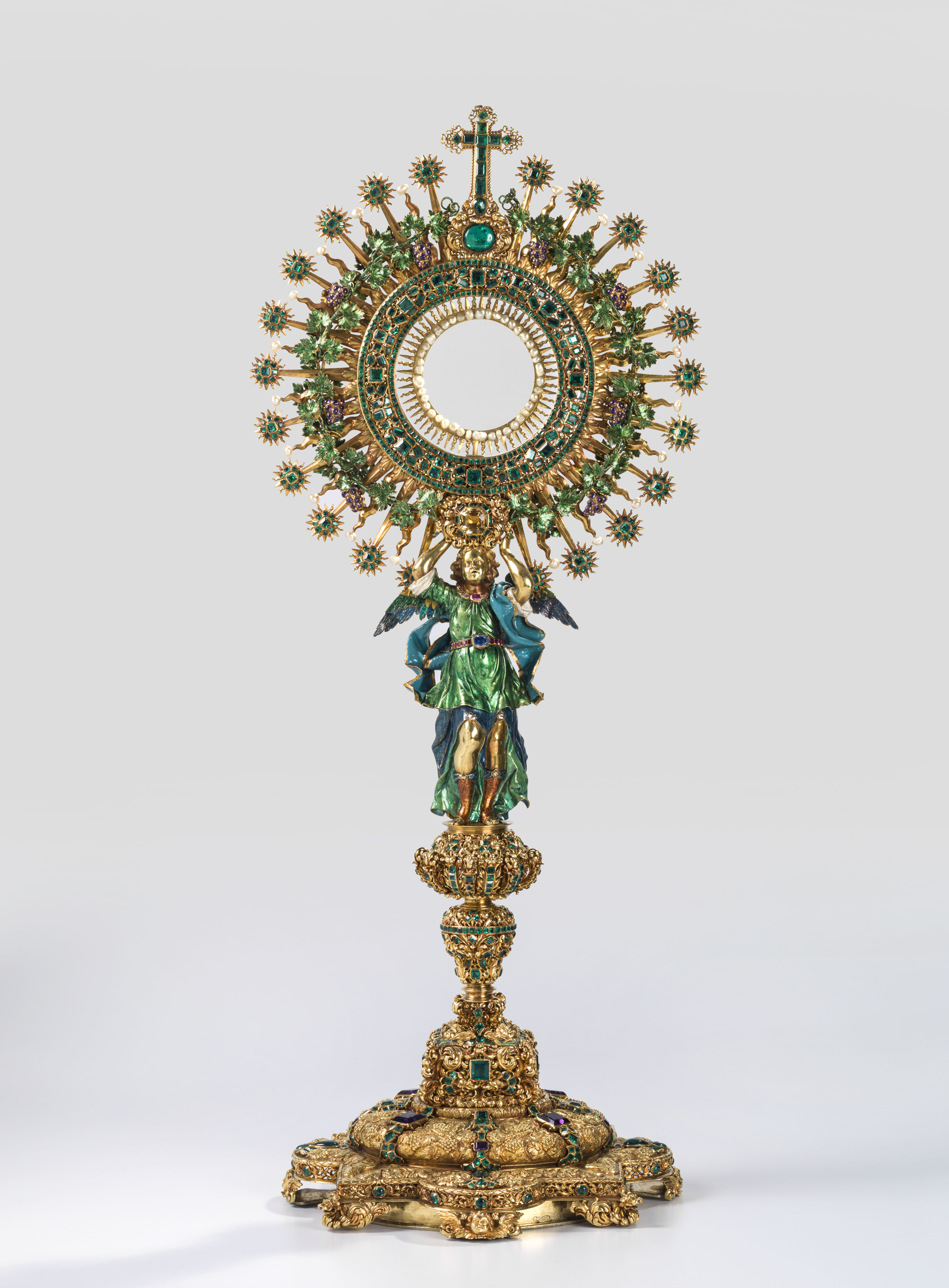
La Lechuga

La Lechuga (English: The Lettuce) is a monstrance made between 1700 and 1707 by José de Galaz for the San Ignacio Church of Bogotá, then part of the New Kingdom of Granada. It was paid for by a group of Jesuits, probably in order to hide the gems contained in it from the Spanish Crown. La Lechuga is owned by the Bank of the Republic and is on permanent display at the Miguel Urrutia Art Museum in Bogotá, Colombia.

== History ==
It is widely believed that a group of Jesuits ordered La Lechuga to be produced in order to hide the gemstones contained in it from Spanish Crown. The Jesuits contracted the Spaniard José de Galaz who made the monstrance, with the help of two other goldsmiths, between 1700 and 1707 for a fee of $1,100 Reales (equivalent to $100,000 USD in 1996). When José de Galaz finished making La Lechuga on 16 July 1707, he estimated it to be worth $20,000 Reales, or $2,000,000 USD in 1996.

The name comes from the large number of emeralds built into the monstrance, which make it look as green as a lettuce.

La Lechuga was held by San Ignacio Church until 1767 when King Charles III of Spain ordered all Spanish possessions to be removed back to Spain. In order to keep it out of Spanish hands, a group of Jesuits hid La Lechuga. Its fate during this period of concealment is largely unknown and La Lechuga was not seen in public again until 1985, when Colombia's central bank, the Bank of the Republic, bought it for $3,500,000 USD. Today, La Lechuga is on permanent display at the Miguel Urrutia Art Museum in Bogotá, Colombia, as part of the Banco de la Republica Art Collection.

== Description ==
The treasure is a prime example of the gold and silver eucharistic objects made for Catholic church altars in South America particularly in colonial times. It was used to present the consecrated "host", as part of the liturgical ritual of the Feast of Corpus Christi, in which it is carried in procession for adoration by the faithful. As a sculpture, it has both high and low relief modelling.

Although highly ornate, the form is that of a typical monstrance, with a cross-crowned disc forming a circular frame to hold the host, supported by an angel, who stands atop a knobbed stem, allowing the faithful to see it. The whole item weighs 4.9 kilograms (10 lbs 13 oz).

The main disc is an elaborate circular form with undulating rays symbolizing the sun. From the centre outwards, baroque pearls immediately surround the space for the host, in turn surrounded by waved gold spikes and four tiers of mostly square-cut emeralds. A thick garland of green enamelled vine leaves with amethyst grapes festoon twenty undulating rays, each terminating in a pearl. Between these undulating rays are twenty-two sunbeams, which each end in radiating gold and emerald sun-discs. The whole circular schema is topped by an emerald cross and below is supported by an angelic "Atlas" figure in a tunic and flowing drapery of blue and green enamel. The angel wears golden caligae (open Roman boots), and above its head on the front is a single large yellow sapphire; on the reverse side is a large, square, high-quality amethyst.

Knobbed for a secure hand grip, the stem is styled like a fountain with emerald streams dripping onto an amethyst-studded base, which itself stands atop a footed stand with eight-lobes. Zoomorphic forms (vines and creatures) are densely packed in low relief gold modelling resembling a paradise.

According to the current owners, La Lechuga is considered one of the "richest and most beautiful religious jewels" in Spanish America, and is an example of how the "land of goldsmiths" interpreted the Baroque. Further, it shows how this artistic style found new dimensions in a territory where gold and emeralds were abundant.

== Jewels ==
The main frame is composed of 8,850.3 grams (312.19 oz) of 18 carat gold, in addition to which La Lechuga also contains the following gemstones:

- 1,485 emeralds from Muzo, Colombia
- 168 amethysts from India
- 62 baroque pearls from Curaçao
- 28 diamonds from South Africa
- 13 rubies from Dutch Ceylon, today Sri Lanka
- 1 yellow sapphire from Thailand

== Special exhibitions ==
La Lechuga left the country for the first time for a special exhibition in Spain's Museo del Prado between March 3 and May 31 of 2015.

Between September 20, 2017 and January 15, 2018, La Lechuga was exhibited in the Louvre in Paris, alongside a statue of Saint Barbara by Pedro Laboria. La Lechuga was also temporarily displayed at the National Museum of Ancient Art in Lisbon, Portugal in late 2018.

== Bibliography ==
- Jaramillo Agudelo, Darío. (2021). One hundred treasures from the Museo de Arte Miguel Urrutia. Bogotá: Banco de la República de Colombia. ISBN 978-958-664-428-0
