= Giovanni Francesco Maineri =

Italian painter

Giovanni Francesco Maineri or Gianfrancesco de' Maineri (active 1489–1506) was an Italian painter of the Renaissance, active in Ferrara.

Putatively born in Parma to a painter Pietro de Maineri. He worked in Ferrara for the ruling Este family. His style recalls that of the contemporary Ercole de' Roberti. Lorenzo Costa, another Roberti pupil, completed an altarpiece by Maineri, when the latter left for Mantua in 1498.

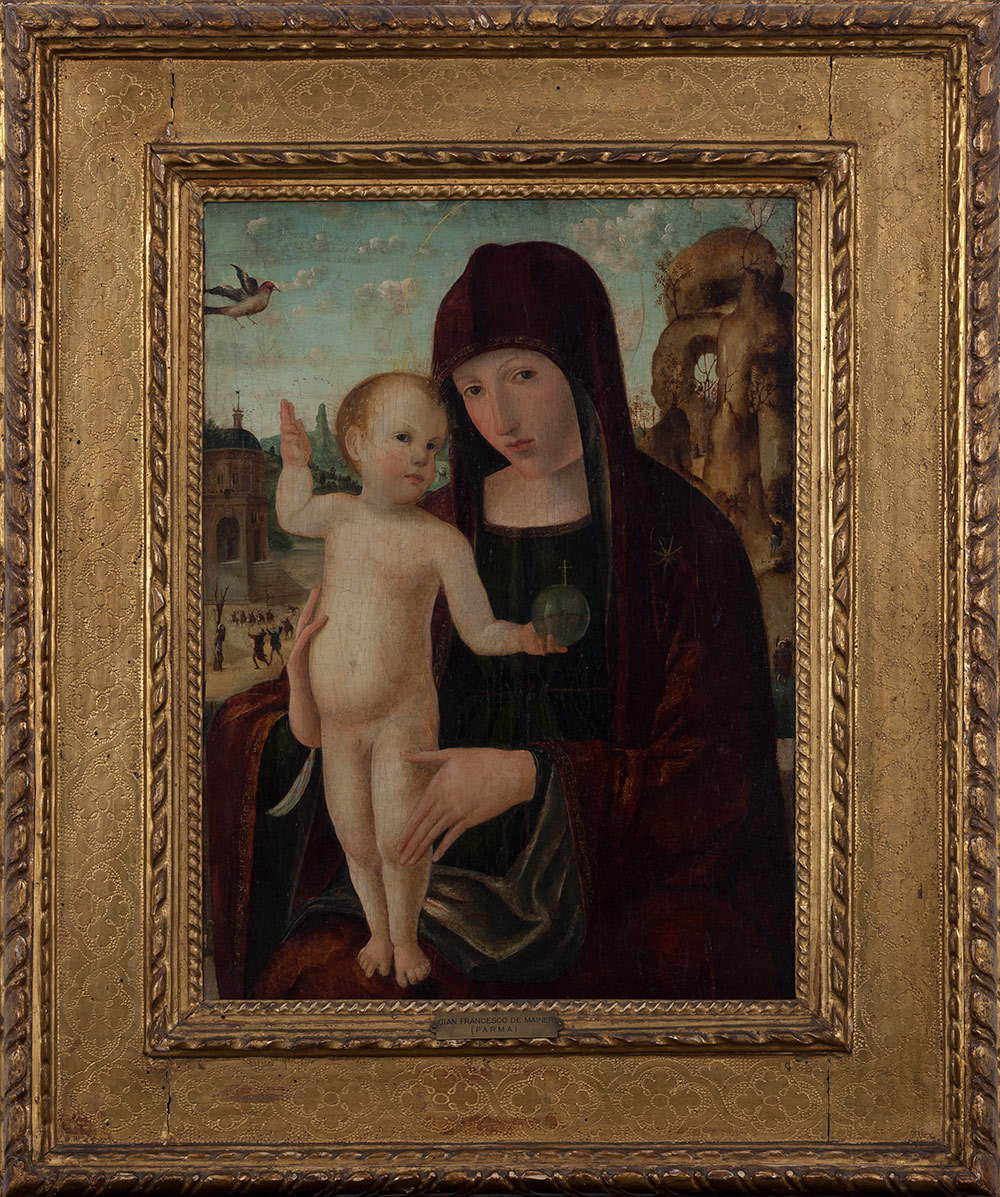
Madonna and child, Miguel Urrutia Art Museum

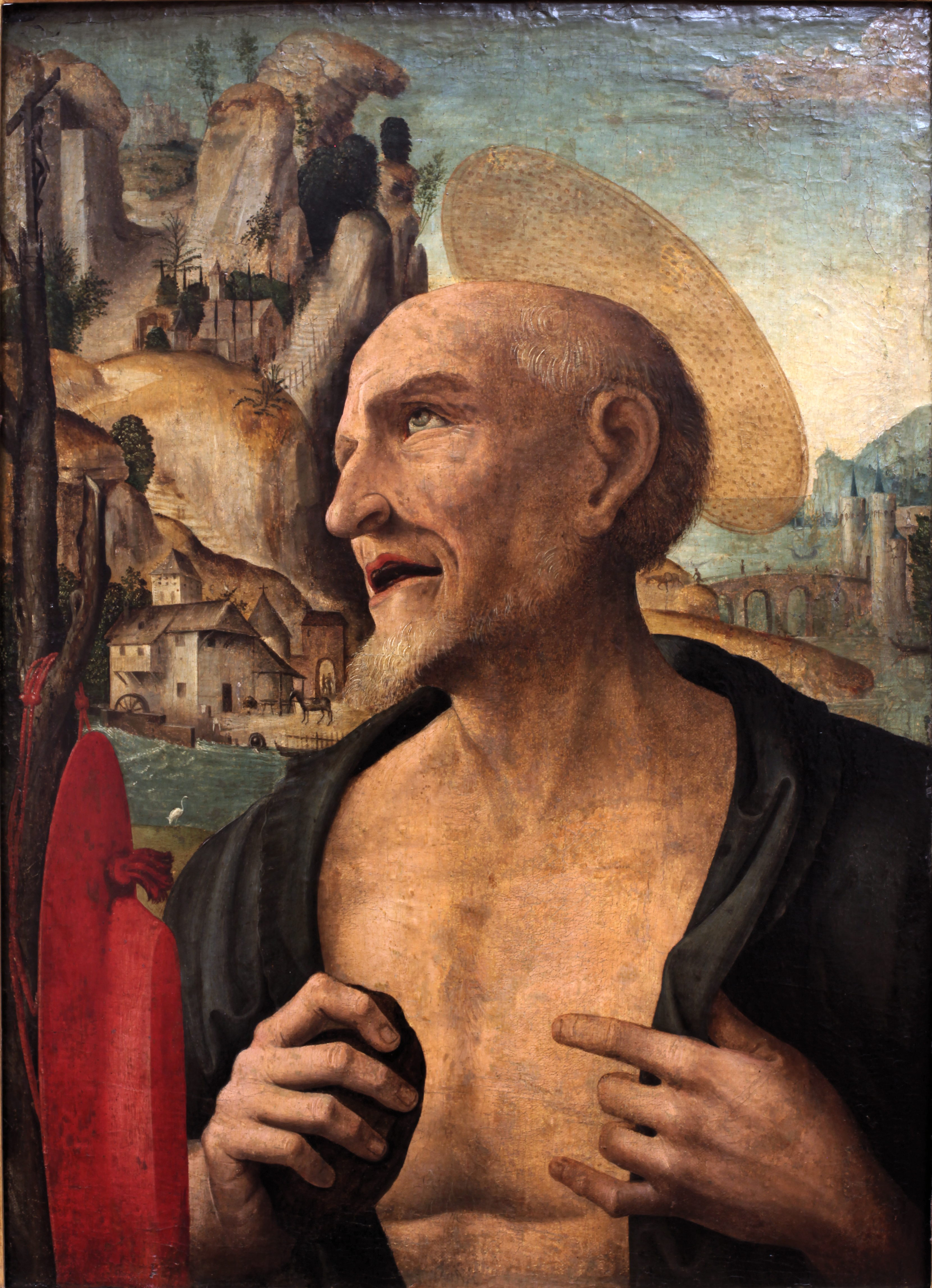
St Jerome in Penitence, Musée des Beaux-Arts de Lyon

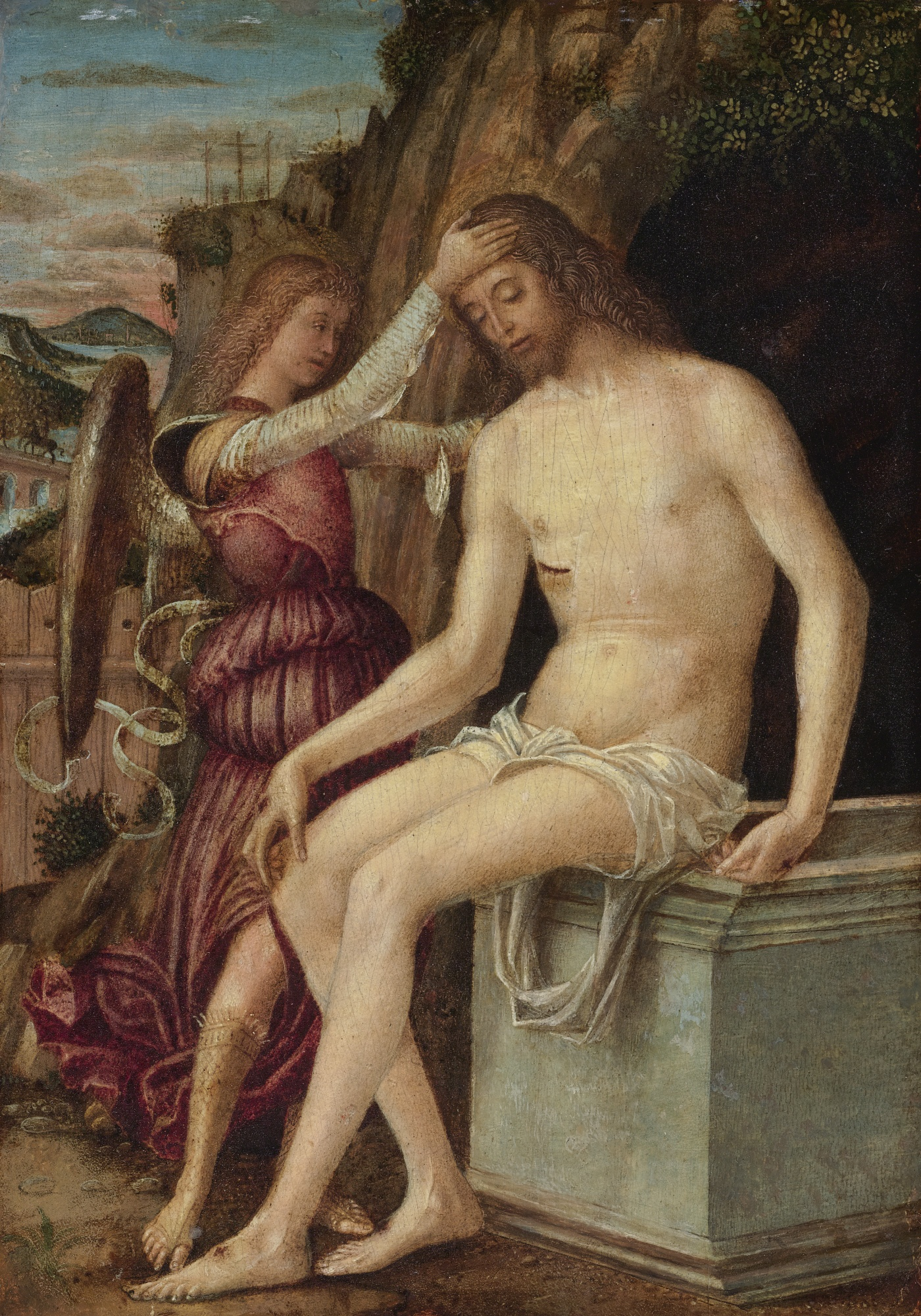
Resurrected Christ with Angel.
