= Pedro José Figueroa =

Colombian portrait painter

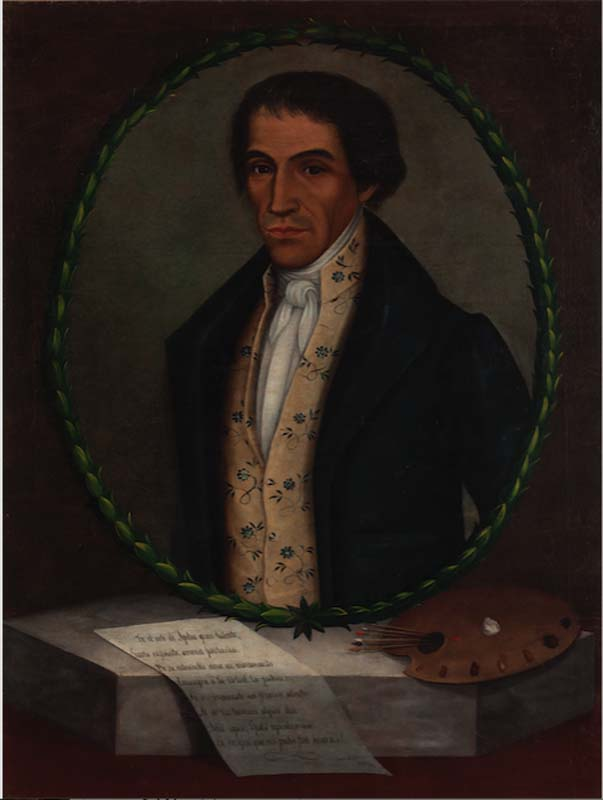
- Posthumous portrait by his disciple Luis García Hevia, 1836
- Born: Pedro José Figueroa; 1770; Santafé de Bogotá, Viceroyalty of New Granada
- Died: March 24, 1836 (aged 65–66); Bogotá, Republic of New Granada
- Known for: Painting

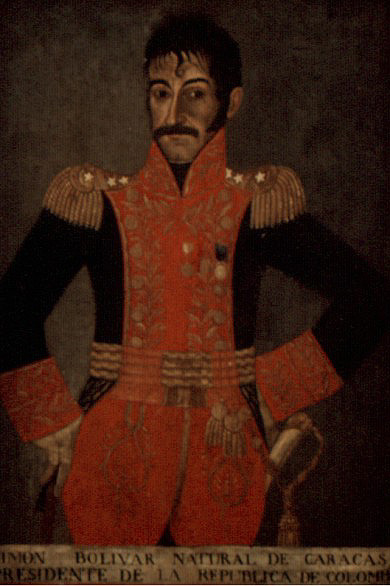
Simón Bolívar, one of Pedro José Figueroa's portraits

Pedro José Figueroa (1770–1836) was a Colombian portrait painter.

== Early life ==
The portrait painter Pedro José Figueroa was born in 1770 in Bogotá, Viceroyalty of New Granada, where he later died on March 24, 1836. It is believed that he is a descendant of a family of artists first made famous during the 17th century. Figueroa received his first painting lessons at the studio of Pablo Antonio García. After completing his studies Figueroa founded his own painting studio where he taught various students including painter Garcia Hevia, the historian José Manuel Goot, and his own sons.

== Works ==
Figueroa's first major work came in 1804 when he painted the Viceroy Amar y Borbon who was a widely popular figure at the time. In 1813 he painted the only known portrait of Jose Domingo Duquesne and later published in “Papel Periodico Ilustrado”. In 1835 Figuroa touched up the famous painting of the “Madonna of la Candelaria” originally painted by Francisco del Poza. Paintings of the Quinta de Bolívar, Bolívar portraits, the painting of “La Santisima Trinidad” are currently housed in the Cathedral of Bogota which also the portraits of Brion, Canon Duquesne, Fray Fernando del Portillo y Torres, and the archbishops and Fernando Caicedo Florez Juan Bautista Sacristan.

== Legacy ==
While the work of Figueroa was not numerous, they are interesting in that the painting and the painter himself lived at a crucial time when a colony was being shaped into a republic. Figueroa's portraits give us a sense of who was important and influential to the period and place.

== Sources ==
- Ricaurte, Dr. Carmen Ortega. “PEDRO JOSE FIGUEROA” Diccionario de artistas en Colombia 1ª Edición. < http://www.colarte.com/colarte/conspintores.asp?idartista=1011 >
