= Álvaro Barrios =

Colombian painter

Álvaro Barrios Vasquez (Cartagena de Indias, born 27 October 1945) is a Colombian conceptual artist and cartoonist.

== Early life ==
Álvaro Barrios has lived in Barranquilla since he was six months old, the city which he considers his hometown. He did his primary and secondary education in Barranquilla and entered the University of Atlántico to study architecture, which he abandoned to study Art History in Perugia and Venice in Italy. Since he was eight years old, he studied painting and drawing in the Barranquilla School of Fine Arts.

== Career ==
In 1966, Marta Traba showcased his drawings which were based on a Dick Tracy comic strip in an exhibition in Bogota. In 1968, his work "Environmental Spaces" became known as the first example of conceptual art in Colombia. Since then his work has been characterized by his drawings, the engravings, collages, and photography, in keeping with his tendency to recreate comic strips and recognized works of art.

Barrios is considered one of the most versatile and unique artists in the world of Colombian art.
