= Andrés de Santa Maria =

Colombian painter (1860–1945)

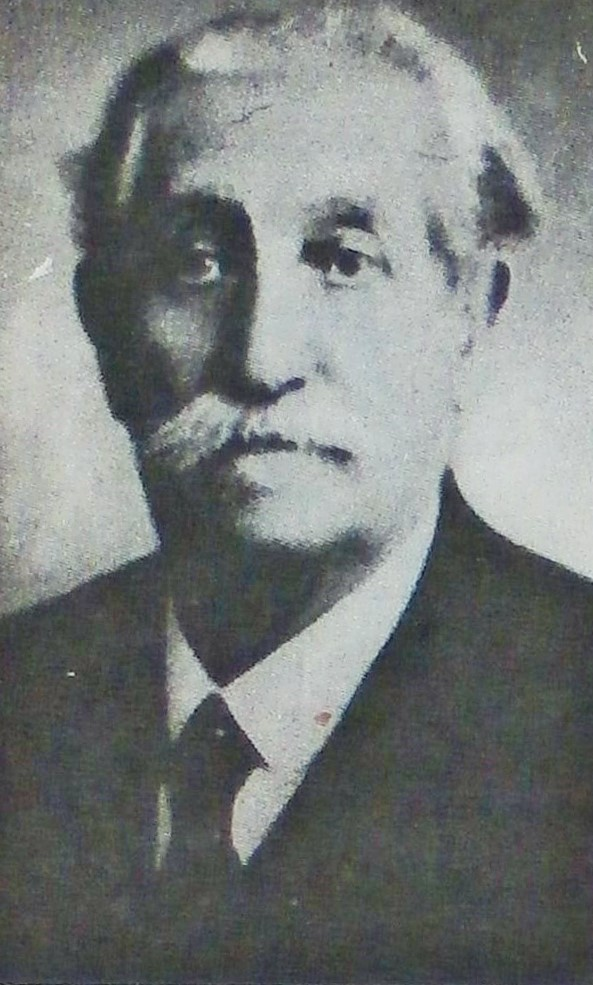
- Andrés de Santa María.
- Born: Andrés de Santa María Hurtado; December 16, 1860; Bogotá, Colombia
- Died: April 29, 1945 (age 85); Brussels, Belgium
- Known for: Painting
- Movement: impressionism

Andrés de Santa María (December 16, 1860 – April 29, 1945) was the most internationally known Colombian painter of his time and the pioneer of impressionism in Colombia. His work in solitary as a vanguardist painter frames the beginnings of modern art in Colombia. Santa Maria's search for new artistic expressions generated rejection and controversies around his work. He lived a great part of his life in Europe.

== Early life ==
Andrés de Santa María Hurtado was born in Bogotá, Colombia on December 16, 1860. He was the third son of Andrés de Santa María Rovira and Manuela Hurtado. He belonged to a well off family that was politically connected. Both his grandfather and his father worked for several years in high official positions for the Colombian government. In 1862, when he was two years old, his parents took him to Europe. The family lived in London until 1869 when they moved to Brussels. In 1878, his father obtained a position at the Colombian Embassy in France and his family settled in Paris. Santa Maria's desire to be a painter faced the strong opposition of his parents who forced him to follow a career in finances. For a time, he worked as a banker, but at the death of his father in 1882, he was finally able to study painting. He entered the School of Art in Paris and worked in the workshops of Ferdinand Jacques Humbert (1842–1881) and Henri Gervex (1852–1929). Prince Eugen of Sweden and the Spanish painter, Ignacio Zuloaga y Zabaleta, studied with him under Gervex's guidance. The impressionist art movement had a great influence on his career, but Santa Maria was also interested in social subjects shown in the work of Alfred Roll and through him, he was influenced by the realism movement and the paintings of Jean-François Millet and Gustave Courbet.

Santa Maria first obtained recognition when he won a first prize and was accepted to participate in the salon of French Artists in 1887 with his painting Launderers of the Seine. This large and ambitious painting already shows impressionist elements in the use of the reflection of light and his interest in social subjects.

He took part in the salons of 1888, 1889 and 1890. In this early period, Santa Maria painted a variety of works with a refined liking for realism in the style of Courbet in works as: The shooters (1885), The reading (1886) and Salomón F. Koppel (1889). These paintings also show Santa Maria's clear command of the rules of the academy. In 1891, he exhibited his painting: The tea party, at the Artistic union of Paris. The tea party is one of the best works of his early period that concludes when he left Europe to go back to Colombia.

== Colombia ==
Andrés de Santa Maria married Amalia Bidwell Hurtado on January 25, 1893, in Saint-Jean-de-Luz. They had eight children. In 1894, the couple decided to come back to Colombia, where they lived for almost two decades. Shortly after arriving at Bogotá, Santa Maria was appointed professor of landscape at the Academy of Fine Arts of Bogotá, where he brought the experience he had learned in France. However, his work as a vanguardist artist breaking with the traditional academic painting in Colombia was controversial.

During the Colombian Civil War called, the Thousand Days War, the Academy was closed, and Santa Maria made a long trip to Europe. In Paris, he took part in the French salon with his painting Los dragoneantes de la guardia inglesa, which received a congratulation letter from the jurors. At the end of the Thousand Days War, he came back to Colombia, where in 1904, he was appointed director of the Academy of Arts, a position he held for the rest of the years he lived in his native country (until 1911). He was invited by the president of the republic, general Rafael Reyes, to perform an exhibition with the writers Sanín Cano, Hinestroza Daza and Max Grillo. In 1906 he painted the triptych of the National Capital, in this represented Simon Bolivar directing the liberation campaign.

While in charge of the Academy, he also founded the school of decorative and industrial arts, in which other artistic techniques like pottery, wood and stone carving and smelting were taught. In 1910, he organized an exhibition commemorating the centenary of the Independence of Colombia in which he exhibited forty-six of his works.

As an artist, Santa Maria did not enjoy great recognition and his work as director of the academy was controversial. Under a cloud of criticism, he decided to resign to his post and left Colombia to never return. On finishing his work as director of the School of Fine Arts, he returned again to Europe and settled in Brussels.

== Later life ==
Santa Maria left for Europe in 1911. With his family, he traveled to England, the Netherlands and France before settling in Brussels. At the outbreak of World War I, he moved to Paris where he established a friendship with the sculptor Antoine Bourdelle. During the war he traveled to London; he finally settled in San Sebastian, where he remained until 1918.

At the end of the war, he came back to Brussels. During this, the third period of his career, he earned distinctions as a painter in exhibitions in 1936 in Brussels and in 1937 in London (Burlington Gallery, displaying 125 paintings made over a 30-year period from 1907). He captured the modern tendencies of the European art, but was inspired by the great master like el Greco. Until the last years of his life, Santa Maria remained active and held many exhibitions of his works.

Andrés de Santa Maria died on April 29, 1945, of kidney infection. He was eighty-five years old. After his death, there have been many exhibitions of his works, most notably at the Colombian National Museum in 1949 and the Museo de Arte Moderno de Bogotá in 1971, when 126 of his paintings were exhibited.

== Style and legacy ==
His paintings can be divided into three different periods of evolution. In his early works, executed while living in France, light and color have great importance. His second period began with his return to Colombia. It is characterized by a style within the divisionism, a method of painting that uses pure color, harmony and contrast. His last period began when he was back in Europe. He used a richer pictorial language, employing knives and spatulas to apply thick layers of paint. The forms became denser and more vibrant.

Santa Maria's work was in essence, impressionist in character and his work influenced modern painting in Colombia. Sometimes, this impressionism however would take passage to postimpressionist and other influences. He influenced the work of later artists such as Fídolo Alfonso González Camargo and Roberto Páramo. In Latin America, one can draw parallels of his work with the Venezuelan Armando Reverón and the Uruguayan Pedro Figari. The greatest collection of his works amounting to some 30 oil paintings is conserved by the National Museum of Colombia in Bogota. The museum owns emblematic pieces such as "En la Playa de Macuto" (Ca. 1907). His other works are in museums such as Colección de Arte del Banco de la República, the Biblioteca Luis Ángel Arango, Museo de Arte Moderno de Bogotá and the Museo de Antioquia in Medellín, Antioquia.

== Bibliography ==
- Martinez Betancour, : William, Andrés de Santamaria, Biblioteca Virtual del Banco de la República, 2004.
- Andrés de Santamaria, : Exh. cat. Museo Nacional de Bogotá and Musée Marmottan, Paris. 1986
