= Oscar Muñoz (artist) =

Colombian painter

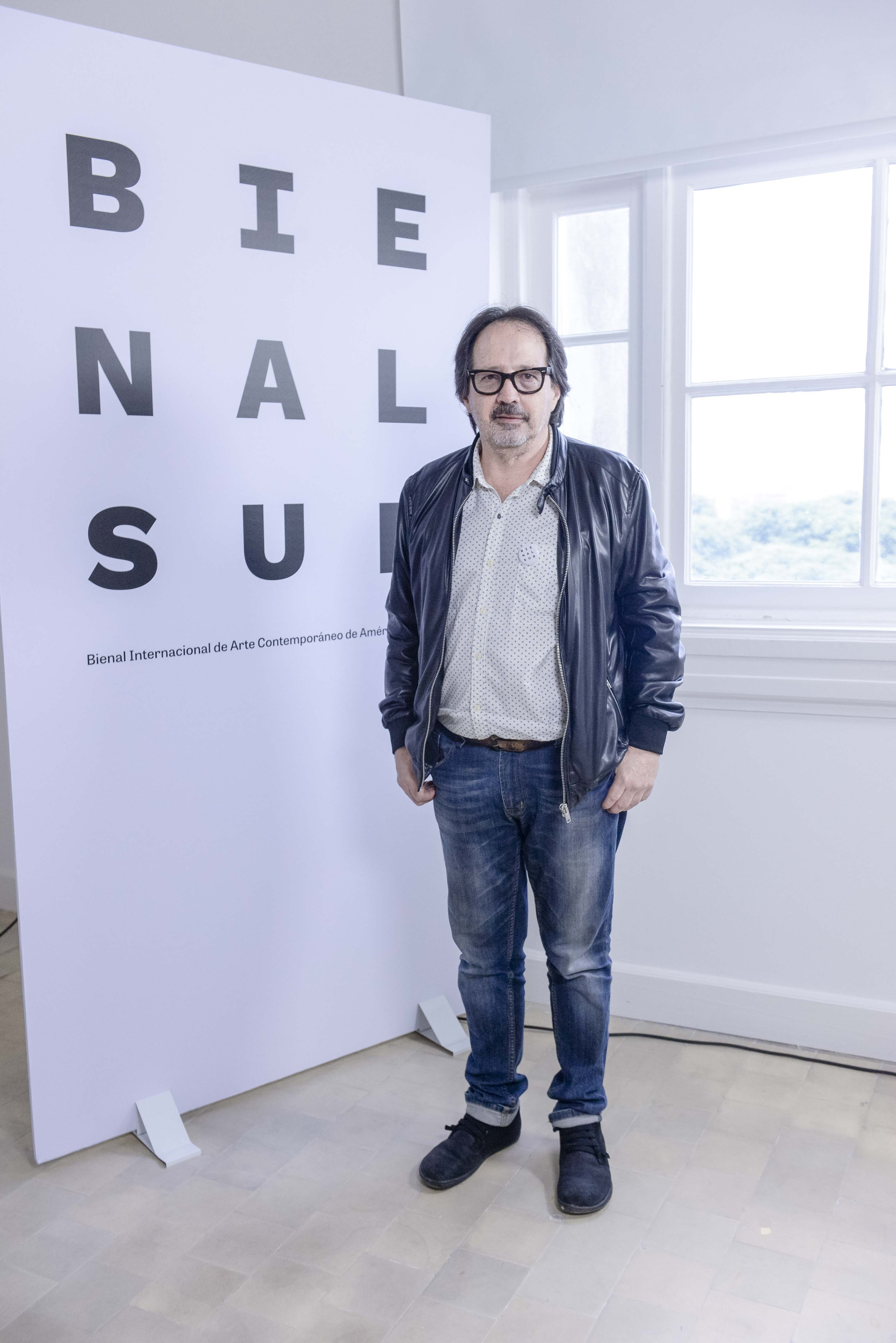
- Born: 1951 (age 74–75); Popayán, Colombia
- Education: The Academia de Bellas Artes (Fine Arts Academy)
- Occupation: Visual Artist
- Years active: 1970s – Present
- Known for: Photorealism, installation art, graphite drawing, video, printmaking, sculpture
- Movement: Contemporary Art

Oscar Muñoz (born 1951) is a Colombian visual artist. He is known as one of the most significant contemporary visual artists in his country, and his work has also gained international recognition. Most of his art is concerned with the idea of representation, and his choice of art medium moves freely between photography (photorealism), printmaking, graphite drawing, installation art, audiovisual media, and sculpture. He also explores how images relate to memory, loss, and the precarious nature of human life.

== Early life and education ==
Muñoz was born in 1951 in Popayán, Colombia and grew up in Cali, Colombia. His family was a middle-class family with a strong inclination towards the arts, and his parents encouraged the artistic practices of their children. As a child, Muñoz was attracted to drawing, and considered it one of his favorite pastimes. He began taking classes at the Academia de Bellas Artes (Fine Arts Academy) in Cali (a school of visual arts, ballet, and theater) when he was still in high school, and the year after he finished high school he completed the visual arts study program (early 1970s).

== Career ==
=== Social and political influences on art ===
Muñoz's career began in the 1970s, with his first art exhibition being held in 1971 in Ciudad Solar (Solar City) - a new alternative art space, which was considered to be one of the first of its kind to exist in Colombia, and was also a major milestone in the history of the arts in Cali. The artistic style in Muñoz's earliest works (which were presented in this space) was heavily influenced by what was going on internationally in the art scene, and as a result his works were concerned with photorealism and hyper-realism. In addition, the social and political issues in Colombia provided him with a subject for his art.

During the early 1970s, Colombia experienced a massive urban expansion due to rural dwellers migrating to the cities. The mass movement of people resulted in the emergence of slums in order to accommodate the large influx of people. This urban phenomena taking place in Colombia drew Muñoz's interest, and so his first series, Inquilinatos (Tenements), focused on the social issues and changes taking place in urban life as a result of the recent urban growth. This first series of his was exhibited in the Ciudad Solar, and it was through this exhibition that he first began to gain attention for his work.

In addition to the rapid urban growth taking place throughout Colombia, there was also an important creative movement taking place in the city of Cali during this time. In an interview, Muñoz explained it as a time of "extensive cultural activity and creativity, ruptures, and exploration for new possibilities in all areas." He believed it was a dynamic and promising moment for Cali, and through it, he found a platform on which to present his work.

Later on in the 1980s and 1990s, Colombia was plagued by wars between feuding drug cartels and the Colombian government, which acted as inspiration for several of Muñoz's pieces during this time. One such piece that came out of this was Ambulatorio: an aerial photograph of Cali printed on a sheet of shattered glass, which viewers can walk on, looking down on the city. As the viewers walk over the photograph, the glass continues to crack under their feet, bringing in the senses of sound and touch. Muñoz explained that this work was inspired by a bombing that had taken place in Cali during the violence of the 1980s and 1990s. After the bomb had exploded, Muñoz was able to walk through the city and in the process became fascinated by the fragments of glass he saw scattered everywhere, some of which had become encrusted into the pavement.

Muñoz continues to explore the theme of violence in Colombia through his current works. He stated that his art endeavors to understand the mechanisms developed by a society that has suffered a routinization of war; a society whose past, present, and most likely future, will continue to be filled with violence on a daily basis. He connects this exploration of ongoing violence in Colombia to the idea of memory, attempting to understand how the continued violence in Colombia has affected the memories of society. Muñoz believes that in a country which has suffered through the existence of violence and wars for decades - and has become all that people have ever known in some cases - memory can become contaminated and confusing. He stated that the particularities of memory can become confused, obscured, and unresolved, and that it becomes difficult to establish distinct moments from Colombia's past and relate them to the present, because everything seems to run together in a continuing narrative of violence. Muñoz's work is a response to a process that has to do with his life and his environment; according to him, "it is my way of trying to understand this malaise."

=== Use of different mediums in artwork ===
In his earliest works, he used charcoal and photography to create pieces that were focused on recreating what he saw in the social conditions around him. He saw photography as a way to add a documentary element to his drawings, and to explore elements such as light, shadow, and other details. As his career progressed, he began to focus more on the theme of reflection in his works, and so he saw photography as a way to further this idea of reflection, as well as to explore the relationships between illusion, truth, and reality - a theme which is continued in his artworks today. Even in his recent works he continues to use charcoal and photography, but he has also introduced new materials such as glass, mirrors, and audiovisual media, as well as other ephemeral materials.

=== Major contributions ===
In 2006, Muñoz founded a cultural center and art residency program in Cali, Colombia called Lugar a Dudas (Space for Doubts). This art center has become a place for young artists to gather in order to work through ideas, as well as to participate in a dialogue and public debate about art and politics.

Muñoz has several works in the collection of the Museum of Modern Art, New York, including "Untitled" from the series Dried Narcissus (Narciso seco) (1996) a screenprint on acrylic, and The Game of Probabilities (2007) a series of chromogenic color prints.

== Selected artworks and analysis ==
=== Inquilinatos (Tenements), charcoal drawings, 1971–1972 ===
The Inquilinatos drawings were some of the earliest works Muñoz produced. These hyper-realistic charcoal drawings depicted several large mansions originally inhabited by important families on the Main Plaza of the downtown area of Cali, Colombia. During the major urban expansion in Cali in the 1970s, these mansions were abandoned by the important families, and the rooms were subsequently rented out to other rural families during a time of extreme overcrowding. Muñoz employed the use of photographic documentation in order to create these works. In these drawings, Muñoz hoped to introduce and convey the social and urban issues as well as changes that were happening as a result of the extreme urban expansion taking place in the city. Through these works he also attempted to re-contextualize and assimilate an international artistic tendency of that time period to one that fit Colombia. His drawings were first displayed in the Ciudad Solar (a groundbreaking new alternative art space in Cali), and it was through these pictures that Muñoz first began to receive attention for his work.

=== Cortinas de Baño (Shower Curtains), installation art/photograph transferred to curtain using acrylics, 1985–1989 ===
This series marked a turning point in Muñoz's career. Up until this point his works had consisted primarily of hyper-realistic charcoal drawings and photographs, so this marked the beginning of exploring the use of new materials in his art. Shower Curtains was an installation piece consisting of several bathroom curtains placed side-by-side. On each curtain a silhouette of a body is portrayed in different poses, making it look as if someone is standing behind the curtain and taking a shower. In order to get the images transferred onto the shower curtains, Muñoz used an airbrush and silkscreen to stain the curtains. This technique was meant to make it unclear to the spectator whether or not there was actually someone standing behind the curtain. The main idea Muñoz hoped to explore in this piece was the relationship between illusion and truth, and illusion and reality. His hope was that through this installation piece, spectators would be invited to join in and reflect on this idea as well.

=== Narcisos en proceso (Narcissi in process), screen print on water, first exhibited in 1995 (ongoing) ===
Narcisos (1995) at the Metropolitan Museum of Art in 2022

The Narcisos series is a work that has been spanning over more than 15 years. To create these pieces, Muñoz uses a screen printing technique, whereby he transfers a picture of himself onto a silkscreen; this screen is then placed over a tray filled with water, and charcoal is sifted through the screen. The charcoal dust settles on the surface of the water, and floats precariously "in an imminent process of change and destruction." As the water begins to evaporate, the process of transformation begins. The image is continuously distorted as the water levels go down, and is also exposed to the circumstances of the environment in which it is in (climate, humidity, and other variables) that could alter the image's outcome. Eventually, once all of the water has evaporated, the charcoal dust settles onto paper that has been placed at the bottom of the tray and the image becomes fixed onto the paper. Muñoz states that there are three moments in the process of the Narcisos creation: when the dust touches the water and first becomes an image, when it goes through the process of change during evaporation, and finally when the dust settles on the bottom of the tray and becomes a fixed image. Each of these moments are meant to represent the processes of creation, life, and eventual death. In addition to this theme, Muñoz also explores the idea of the self-portrait - how his image becomes the image of the viewer, and how the viewer can recognize a part of themselves in the image of Muñoz.

=== Aliento, (Breath), installation art - mirrors, 1995–2002 ===
This series consists of seven small oval mirrors screen printed with grease installed at eye level for viewers. At first the mirrors appear to be normal mirrors, but if the viewer moves closer to breathe on them, an image of another person is revealed in the vapor of the viewer's breath. The pictures that are revealed are of deceased people whose pictures were taken from newspaper obituaries, which Muñoz had collected over the years (many of whom had died due to political violence in Colombia at the time). The central idea that Muñoz wanted to explore and express in this work was that of memory - how it can never be made permanent, despite our best efforts to hold onto it - as well as the relationship between life and death. Muñoz explained this concept in an interview, saying that: "In the mechanism of breathing, there is a relationship with the other and with oneself: when you mist up the image with your breath, your image is erased, you no longer exist, and it is somebody else. But you cannot continue to exhale in order to sustain the other person, you need to inhale. So that, at the moment in which you stop exhaling and inhale again, the other person disappears and you reappear in the mirror. There is the confrontation between one's own life and that of another..." Through these ephemeral moments, the reflected image disappears, and reveals the fleeting image of someone who has already disappeared, who returns as a result of the breath of life given to them by the viewer. This work was further analyzed in the article, "Assisted Breathing: Developing Embodied Exposure in Oscar Muñoz's 'Aliento.'"

=== Re/trato (Self-Portrait), video of water on cement, 2004 ===
In this work, a video is played which shows a hand using water to paint a portrait onto hot cement, however, the water continually evaporates before the portrait can be completed. This work plays on Muñoz's impulse to keep memory alive, and the frustration that can come along with that attempt. Because the portrait never takes on a definite form, the viewer is forced to try to remember and reconstruct the image in their mind, and so they are only able to take away an idea of it. This idea can change in the mind of the viewer, since it doesn't have a strong or permanent structure. Muñoz explained in an interview something he particularly liked about this work, which was that "the idea that something that generally functions with the ephemeral, with the temporal, with the instant, can have a lasting effect, like an intense emotional experience, that transcends the actual experience of the work." This work was eventually expanded upon to become Proyecto para un Memorial (Project for a Memorial), which was presented to the public sphere in 2005.

== Solo exhibitions ==
- 1971: Ciudad Solar (Solar City), Cali, Colombia
- 1985: La Tertulia Museum, Cali, Colombia
- 1990: Superficies al Carbón, Museo de Arte Moderno la Tertulia, Cali, Colombia; Sala Suramericana de Seguros, Medallin, Colombia
- 1995: Narcisos (Narcissus), Museo de Arte Moderno La Tertulia, Bogota, Colombia; Galeria Garcis Velasquez, Bogotá, Colombia
- 1998: Narcisos (Narcissus), Aliento (Breath), Centro MEC, Ministerio de Educacion y Cultura, Montevideo, Uruguay
- 2002: Transfiguraciones, Iturralde Gallery, Los Angeles, CA, USA
- 2002: Eclipse, Galeria Santa Fe, Planetario Distrital, Bogota, Colombia
- 2002: The Ends of Process, Sicardi Gallery, Houston, TX, USA
- 2003: TEORéTICA, San José, Costa Rica
- 2004: Ambulatorio-Re/trato, FotoFest 2004, Sicardi Gallery, Houston, TX, USA
- 2005: Proyecto para un memorial, Galería Santa Fe, Planetario Distrita, Bogotá, Colombia; Iturralde Gallery, Los Angeles, CA, USA; Feria de Video Arte, LOOP Barcelona, Spain
- 2006: Disolvencias y Fantasmagorías, Museo Municipal de Guayaquil, Ecuador
- 2006: Biografías (Biographies), Claustro del Convento de Santa Clara, Cartagena, Colombia
- 2008: Documentos de la Amnesia, Museo Extremeño e Iberoamericano de Arte Contemporáneo, Badajoz, Spain
- 2009: The Disappeared, University of Wyoming Art Museum, Laramie, WY, USA
- 2008–2009: Mirror Image, Perth Institute of Contemporary Arts, Perth, Australia; Institute of International Visual Arts, Rivington Place, London, UK
- 2010: Volverse aire, PHotoEspaña 2010 / PHE10, Círculo de Belles Artes, Sala Goya, Madrid, Spain
- 2008–2012: Imprints for a Fleeting Memorial, The Visual Arts Center of Richmond, VA, USA; Southeastern Center for Contemporary Art, Winston-Salem, NC, USA; La Galerie de I'UQAM, Montreal, Canada; Prefix Institute of Contemporary Art, Toronto, Canada
- 2012: Ambulatorio (Draw Down the Walls), Belfast, Northern Ireland
- 2006–2014: Biografias (Biographies), University of New Mexico Art Museum, Albuquerque, NM, USA; Fundaçāo Joaquim Nabuco, Recife, Brazil; The Mandes & Arts Festival, Johan Deumens Gallery, Haarlem, The Netherlands; Cornerhouse, Manchester, UK; Art Gallery of New South Wales, Sydney, Australia; Claustro del Convento de Santa Clara, Cartagena, Colombia
- 2012–2014: Protografías (Photographs), Jeu de Paume, Paris, France; Museo de Arte Moderno La Tertulia, Cali, Colombia; Museo de Arte de Lima (MALI), Lima, Peru; Museo de Antioquia, Medellín, Colombia; Museo de Arte del Banco de la República, Bogotá, Colombia; Biblioteca Luis Angel Arango, Bogotá, Colombia; Museo de Arte Latinoamericano de Buenos Aires (MALBA), Buenos Aires, Argentina; Museo de Arte del Banco de la República - Biblioteca Luis Ángel Arango, Bogotá, Colombia
- 2013–2014: New Acquisitions in Photography, (May 10, 2013 – January 6, 2014), Museum of Modern Art, New York
- 2014: portrait(self)portrait, Prince Claus Fund Gallery, Amsterdam, the Netherlands
- 2015: Atramentos, Tabacalera, Promocíon del Arte, ARCO Madrid, Madrid Spain
- 2015: Sedimentaciones, University of South Florida Contemporary Art Museum, Institute for Research in Art, College of the Arts, Tampa, FL, USA
- 2016: El Coleccionista (The Collector), Sicardi Gallery, Houston, TX, USA

== Awards ==
- 2018: Hasselblad Foundation Award
