= Antonio Caro =

Colombian conceptual artist (1950–2021)

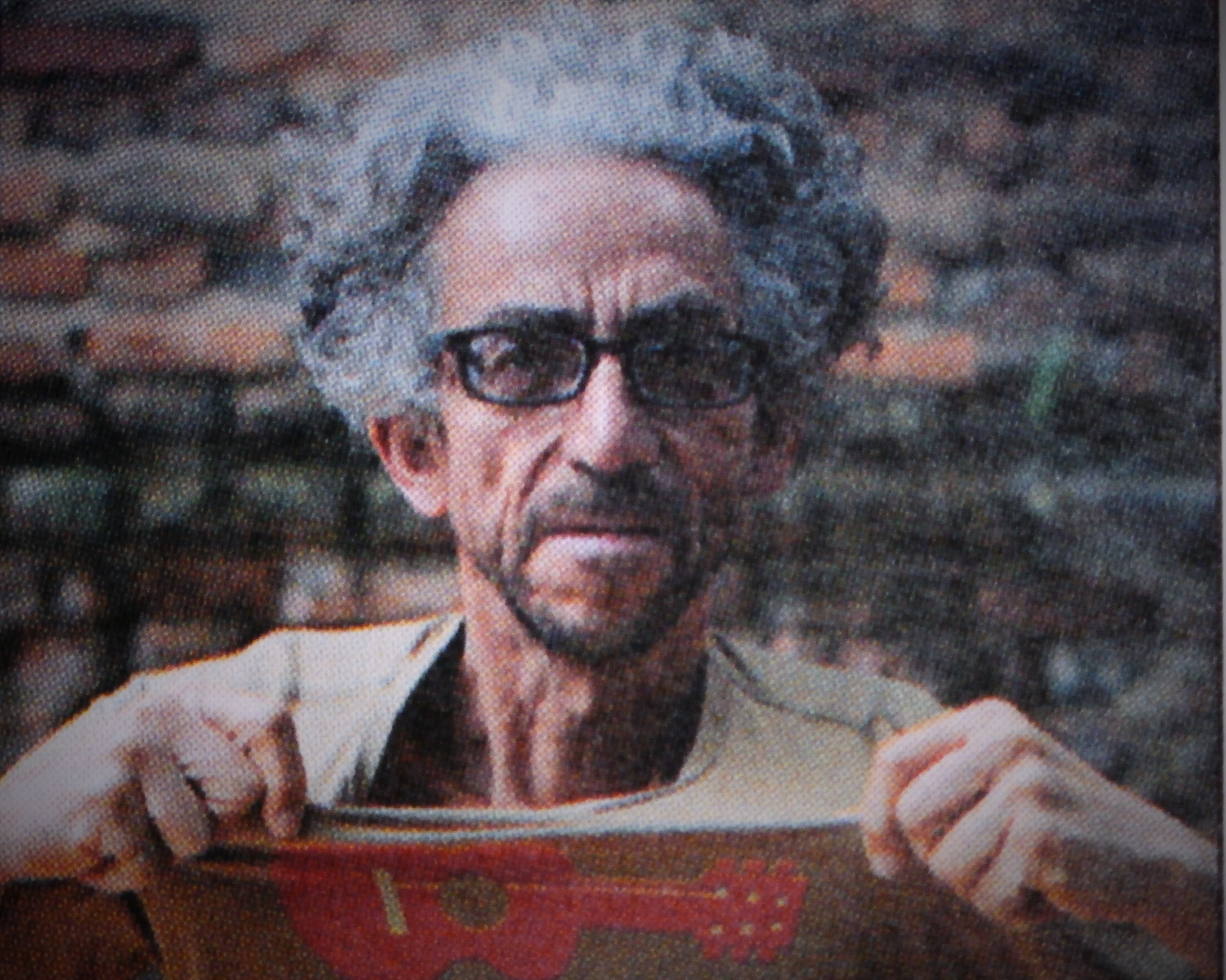
- Born: Antonio José Caro Lopera; 10 December 1950; Bogotá, Colombia
- Died: 29 March 2021 (aged 70); Bogotá, Colombia
- Movement: Conceptual

Antonio José Caro Lopera (10 December 1950 – 29 March 2021) was a Colombian conceptual artist who created works since the late 1960s. He typically used non-traditional forms to create politically and socially charged critiques of Colombian issues. He died in Bogotá on 29 March 2021, aged 70.

== Biography ==
Since 1970, Caro built a career that, according to the categorizations of history and criticism, denotes an authentic example of conceptual art in Colombia.

He achieved his results through the implementation of informal procedures in traditional artistic practice, including photocopying, public installations, lectures, posters, and materials related to indigenous cultural practices, such as salt or achiote. The vast majority of his work makes use of text as a tool to communicate strong messages, but instead acquires the paradoxical nuances of a political nature as a means of production and dissemination. In 1998, Caro received the prestigious Guggenheim Fellowship.

Some of his important works include: Sal (1971), Imperialism is a Paper Tiger (1972), There is No Case (1974), Colombia-Marlboro (1975), Colombia-Coca Cola (1977), Defend Your Talent (1977), Todo está muy Caro (Everything is too expensive; 1978), Homage to Manuel Quintin Lame (1979), Project 500 (1987), and Onoto, among others.

== Style ==
Caro's use of unusual materials included metal, cardstock, salt, and poster boards. He was a strong advocate against traditional art forms and, throughout his career, found ways to stray from the typical. He had a passion for creating art with a social or political message. Nearly all of his works are a political or social critique regarding what he believed to be important global and strictly Colombian issues.

== Early career ==
Caro first became interested in art at the age of 16, while still in high school. He attributed his early interest in art to two specific pieces the Tributo de los Artistas Colombians a Dante (A Tribute by Colombian Artists to Dante) and Espacios Ambientales (Environmental Spaces).

He decided to enroll in the Universidad Nacional de Colombia in Bogota as a Fine Art student shortly after completing high school. However, despite his intense passion for art he dropped out of the university, attributing his lack of academic success to his inability to complete the general curriculum. Despite this, his time at the Universidad Nacional de Colombia brought him closer to political movements that he was interested in as well as brought him an influential mentor, Bernado Salcedo. According to Caro, Salcedo was his most influential role model. Together, they became pivotal founders in the Colombian conceptual art movement. Salcedo introduced Caro to text based art in the late 1960s inspiring him to create SAL. A text based piece of the word sal [Spanish for salt] made from salt. The work was presented in Cali, at the Primera Bienal Americana de Artes Gráficas in 1971.

SAL was one of the first of its kind in Colombia and naturally it aroused critics who claimed artwork lacked a standing in traditional forms. The criticism brought on Caro and Salcedo in the early 1970s inspired them to produce more idea based works rooted in Colombian social issues. As a result, the movement Caro and Salcedo had established in Colombia began to grow apart from conceptual art movements of the same time period in other Latin American countries.

== Formative period ==
=== Cabeza de Lleras ===
Presented in October 1970 at the XXI Salón Nacional de Artistas that took place at the Museo Nacional in Bogotá. The work is a bust made from salt that is seen wearing a pair of glasses encased in a glass container on a pedestal. Water gallery floor to symbolize a denunciatory act on the hegemonic values of society. The result created by the artwork prompted journalist Alegre Levy to write "¡Se inundó el salon!” ("The Salon Flooded!") in her article in Bogotá’s major daily newspaper El Tiempo. A saying which has stuck with the piece ever since.

==== Interpretation of Cabeza de Lleras ====
During the 1960s into the late 1970s Colombian political group El Frente Nacional took power over the Conservative and Liberal Parties of Colombia. The group claimed to be a unifying force between the opposing interests which had devastated the country in the previous decades.

El Frente Nacional, however, proved to be an oligarchy composed of important business interests and Catholic Church authorities. The group had essentially filled the vacuum of power left by the warring Conservatives and Liberals of Colombia and instead established their own tyrannical state under a pretext of democracy. Caro's work captures a representation of one of the early presidents of the group, Carlos Lleras Restrepo. Cabeza de Lleras was made to capture both the insufficiencies and weaknesses of the political hierarchy Lleras represented as well as the cultural destruction and undermining that was beginning to take place. The salt which makes up the bust of Lleras represented both the weakness of the current government according to Caro as well as the cultural traditions of the Chibcha indigenous civilization.

In the original title, Homenaje tardío de sus amigos y amigas de Zipaquirá, Manaure y Galerazamba (Late Homage From his Friends of Zipaquirá, Manaure and Galerazamba), the three cities mentioned Zipaquirá, Manaure and Galerazamba are Colombian cities known for their ancient salt mining industries.

Furthermore, the water poured into the venue according to Caro established the ever-present waters of history which were to eventually dissolve the tyrannical hierarchy of oppression and along with it the cultural backbone of Colombia.

=== Aquí no cabe el Arte ===
First presented at the XXIII Salón de Artistas Nacionales (1972) in Bogotá, Aquí no cabe el Arte (Art Does Not Fit Here) by Caro was the only text based art of its kind among the forty four other works presented at the time. The piece was made of sixteen white poster boards with a sharp, and angular letter written in bold in the center of each poster. Each letter was placed side by side and together measured eleven meters in length. Underneath each poster lies the name of a victim killed by tyrannical governmental forces in Colombia, mainly El Frente. Caro is attempting to use the power of written words to bring attention to political injustice.

==== Interpretation of Aquí no cabe el Arte ====
Caro's Aquí no cabe el Arte came in the wake of the election of Misael Pastrana Borrero as Colombia's President. After taking office in 1970, Borrero began instituting martial law, and as a result began to suppress civil liberties. Forceful action used against organized political strikes as well as the elimination of popular local leaders became increasingly numerous during Borrero's term. As a result of the political atmosphere in Colombia, Caro created the work to highlight the many atrocities being committed at the time. Some of the most well known events include the murder of university student, Romulo Carvahlo during the presidency of Carlos Lleras Restrepo. Carvahlo's death is described by Caro to be an antecedent for the massacre of students after an organized insurrection during Borrero's term as president. Furthermore, also mentioned in the work is the brutal massacre of Guahibo indigenous peoples in Colombia`s Planas region. Among others, these two events struck Caro as noteworthy for people to bring their attention too and as a result were a big reason behind the creation of the piece.

=== El imperialismo es un tigre de papel ===
Originally exhibited in 1973 at the Nombres nuevos en el arte de Colombia (New Names in the Art of Colombia), El imperialismo es un tigre de papel (Imperialism is a Paper Tiger) was the recreation of Mao Tse Tung's famous expression Imperialism is a Paper Tiger. The work is a red banner made of silk, typically used in protests. Painted on the banner were large white letters, forming Mao's famous statement.

Additionally, on each side of the banner Caro placed a total of twelve silhouette tigers to effectively use environmental spaces at the exhibit. The action of setting up the individual tigers was captured in a famous photograph taken of the work by reporters at La Republica.

==== Interpretation of El imperialismo es un tigre de papel ====
Caro's reinstatement of Mao's saying was created to bring light to the influence of Mao's Little Red book to the establishing of new ideas among young Colombians. As Caro stated, "The phrase came to me by inertia, through the context. What I did was convert the phrase into a palpable thing." While still fresh from the creation of Aquí no cabe el Arte, Caro wanted to use the momentum of his previous success to reenact a political critique while bringing in new ideas he had felt were politically relevant.

=== Colombia-Marlboro ===
In 1973, Caro began the Marlboro project aimed at criticizing growing consumerism in Colombia. The Colombia-Marlboro project refers to a number of distinct pieces that are redesigns of Marlboro's trademark logo with "Colombia" put in place of Marlboro. One of the most widely known pieces of this project was presented by Caro at the Agudelo Gallery, made from white cardstock and red tissue paper. Underneath the piece hung a series of flags with the Marlboro design as well as Caro's name put in place of the word Marlboro.

==== Interpretation of Colombia-Marlboro ====
The purpose of Caro`s project was to highlight the growing consumer mentality he was beginning to see expand in Colombia. In order to do so he wanted to use the advertising system against major industrial powers. Although the project seemingly addresses smokers, the actual intent of the work was pertaining to a larger globalization movement that Caro was passionate about. In a statement about the project Caro described some of the main ideas he wished to bring to light

"I am not a sociologist, nor a historian, nor any of those things, but I am a myopic; this allows me to see many things from reality like for instance, that in that epoch there were a lot of people selling Marlboro on the street. From there came the proposal that consisted in fusing the design of Marlboro and the word Colombia."

=== Colombia-Coca-Cola ===
Originally shown at the Lapiz y Papel exhibition by Jonier Marín in 1976. The work was a graphite drawing resembling the famous Coca-Cola style logo but in place of the Coca-Cola name was written “Colombia” in the same font. Later that same year Caro recreated the artwork and presented it to the XXVI Salón Nacional de Artistas. This time the piece was made from metal to better resemble Coca-Cola advertising signs. Furthermore, Colombia was painted onto the metal rather than drawn.

==== Interpretation of Colombia-Coca-Cola ====
Similarly to the context behind Colombia-Marlboro. Caro wanted to highlight the growing consumerism in Colombia that he felt was bringing forth capitalist and imperialist pressures on Colombian identity. Due to the positive feedback he had received after the Marlboro Project, Caro decided to continue the use of advertisement manipulation in order to further the spread of his ideas. Similar works were also taking place in nearby Latin American countries such as Brazil. Although it is not known whether Cildo Meireles' Coca-Cola Project in 1970 had any effect on Caro, the similarities are helpful in understanding the greater context for advertisement based pieces. Caro's overarching desire for the piece was for it to be a symbol of the “Americanization” of Colombian industry. Caro at the time felt as if the Colombian government had essentially sold itself to the hands of American industrial giants such as Coca-Cola.

== Distinctions ==
- 1999: Nominated for the Premio Luis Caballero 211 Versión, Instituto Distrital de Cultura y Turismo, Bogotá, Colombia
- 1998: Scholarship for Artistic Residencies Colombia – México
- 1998: Guggenheim Scholarship
- 1996: Creation Scholarship, Colcultura
- 1992: Creation Scholarship, Colcultura
- 1987: Honourable Mention, XXXI Salón Nacional de Artistas, Medellín, Colombia
- 1976: Medal, XXXVI Salón Nacional de Artistas, Bogotá, Colombia
- 1972: Bolsa de trabajo, VI Salón de Agosto, Museo de Arte Contemporáneo, Bogotá, Colombia

== Collections ==
- Tate Modern, London, England, UK
- Banco de la República, Colombia
- Museo de Arte Moderno, Bogotá, Colombia
- La Tertulia Museum, Cali, Colombia.
- Museo de Arte Moderno, Pereira, Colombia.
- Queens Museum, Queens, New York, U.S.A.
- Blanton Museum of Art, Austin, Texas, USA

== Bibliography ==
- Caro Lopera, Antonio José (2013). El lobo: anécdotas de mi taller de creatividad = The wolf: anecdotes about my workshop on creativity. Bogotá: A. Caro. p. 159. ISBN 9789584635495.
- Caro Lopera, Antonio José (2010). --Antes de Cuiabá = -- Before Cuiabá (PDF) (1st ed.). Archived from the original (PDF) on August 17, 2016.
- Caro Lopera, Antonio José (1988). Quin-ce. Bogotá: Heliofoto Colombiana. p. 16.
