= La Corrida (The Bullfight) =

Painting series by Fernando Botero

La Corrida (English: The Bullfight) is a monographic series of 25 paintings on bullfighting by Colombian artist Fernando Botero, created in 1984-1985. They were presented at the Marlborough Gallery, in New York, as part of an exhibition. One of the largest paintings in this series is The Death of Luis Chalmeta (175 by 121.9 cm). The paintings are now dispersed in several museums.

== History and description ==
Although he felt at first traumatized by his experience at a bullfighting school in Medellín, where he was enrolled by his uncle, Botero would later be fascinated and strongly inspired by the spectacle of bullfighting. His early drawings and paintings focused on bullfighting, specially in the 1980s. He even created later a poster advertising the French bullfighter Sébastien Castella.

In April 1985, Botero presented for the first time at the Marlborough Gallery, this monographic painting series dedicated to bullfighting. The series illustrates the different tercios (phases) of the bullfight. They include works like The Bullfight, one of the smallest, and others such as The Picador Going to the Arena or The Death of Luis Chalmeta, one of the largest.

The impressive set of 25 canvases offers a summary of the event and its surrounding environments. The series notably also includes : The Horse Court and a Marshal, The Tendido, The Banderilles, The Right-Hand Pass, The Estocade, and also depictions of the public in the arena, Flamenco dancers and guitarists.

Botero's bullfighting paintings were exhibited at the Museo Nacional Centro de Arte Reina Sofía, in Madrid, from June to August 1987. The collection was enriched with some more dramatic paintings.
