= Sophia Vari =

Greek painter and sculptor (1940–2023)

- Σοφία Βάρη
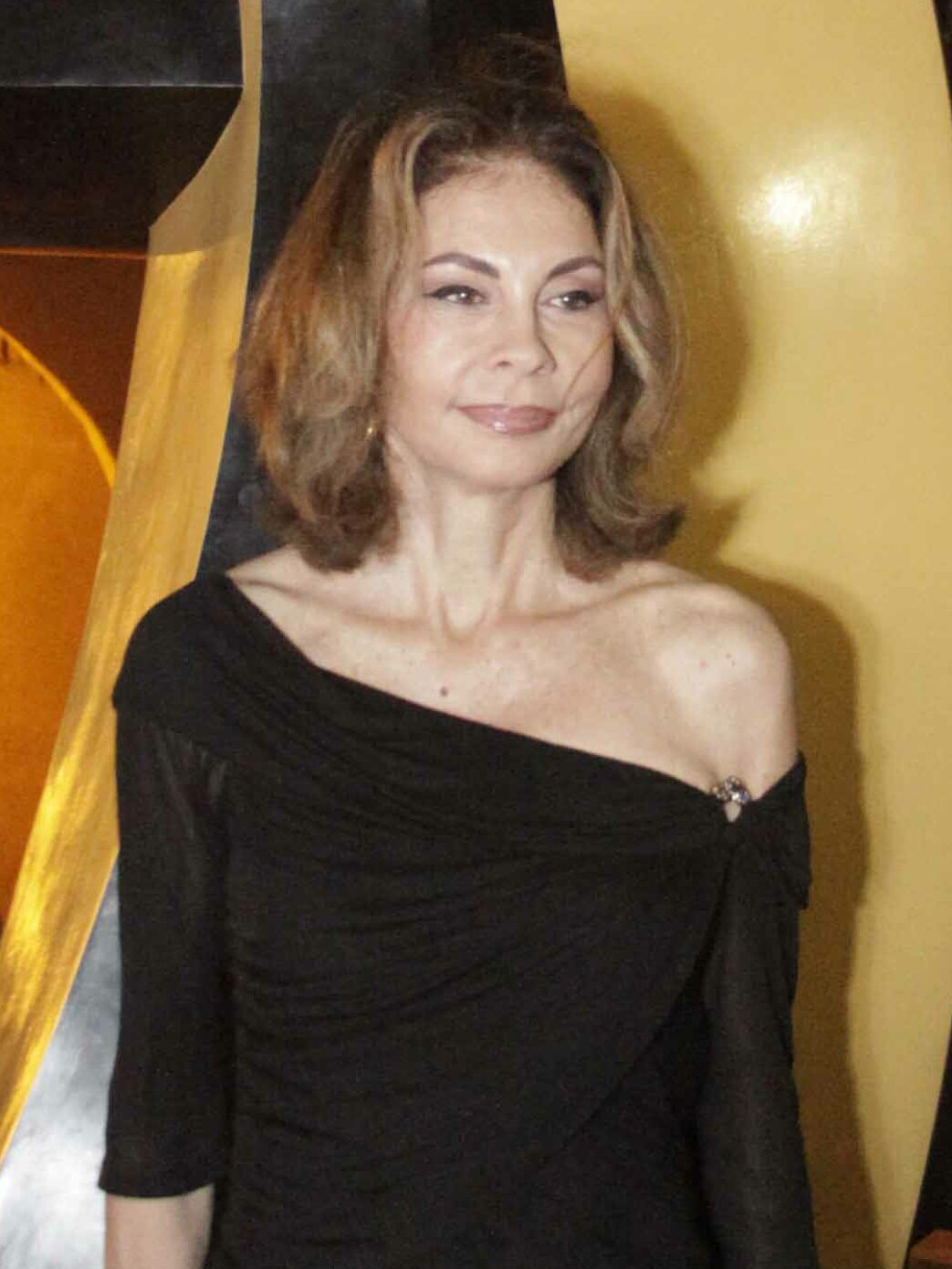
- Sophia Vari in 2011
- Born: Sophia Canellopoulos; 9 October 1940; Vari, Greece
- Died: 5 May 2023 (aged 82); Monte Carlo, Monaco
- Occupations: Painter; Sculptor
- Spouse: Fernando Botero (m. 1978)
- Website: https://sophiavari.com

Sophia Vari (Greek: Σοφία Βάρη; 9 October 1940 – 5 May 2023) was a Greek painter and sculptor.

== Biography ==
Born as Sophia Canellopoulos, she was married to sculptor Fernando Botero. She opened a studio in Paris in 1992, where she trained the likes of Patricia Avellan.

Vari died in Monte Carlo on 5 May 2023.

== Exhibitions ==
Vari's work has been exhibited internationally. In 2004 an exhibition dedicated to her work was held at the Benaki Museum in Athens Her 2008 exhibition at the Temple of Confucius in Beijing, to coincide with the Beijing Olympics, was the first exhibition to be held there by a non-Chinese artist. In 2013 her sculptures and paintings were exhibited at Pera Museum in Istanbul.

Sophia Vari: A Tribute, Twelve Monumental Sculptures was displayed on Park Avenue in New York City until 5 November 2023.

== Works ==
=== Paintings ===
- Lemon
- Female figure

=== Sculptures ===
- Couple
- Et Ton Corps Se Penche Et S'allonge Comme U...
- Les Nénuphars
- Les Amants
- L'astrolabe
- Femme Au Chapeau
- Double Épée
- Nudes
- Ombres nostalgiques
- Éternité secrète
- Ailes du charbon
- Crime passionnel
