= The Death of Luis Chalmeta =

Painting by Fernando Botero

- Artist: Fernando Botero
- Year: 1984
- Medium: oil on canvas
- Dimensions: 121.9 cm × 175 cm (48.0 in × 69 in)
- Location: Private collection

The Death of Luis Chalmeta, also known as The Death of Luis Chalet, is an oil on canvas painting by Colombian artist Fernando Botero, from 1984. It is held in a private collection.

== History and description ==
It represents the death of a bullfighter, who had been just gored by a bull, in an arena. On one side, the gored bullfighter with a lifeless expression is depicted in the mid-air, with his sword flying, seemingly about to fall in the arena. On the other, Chalmeta flies with his cape towards two outstretched female hands through the clouds, as if he was to be taken into Heaven. The painting is both an illustration of the mortality faced by the bullfighters in the arena and also of his often common belief in an afterlife. The bull seems indifferent to the tragedy. The arena is populated by countless spectactors. In the bottom of the painting, a smaller version of a bandarillero can be seen. This work differs from others of Botero because its style seems closer to that of a popular Ex-voto.

The painting was exhibited, along a monographic series of 25 paintings on the subject of bullfighting, with the name La Corrida (The Bullfight), at the Marlborough Fine Art, in New York in 1985. The Death of Luis Chalmeta is the largest work in the series.

Botero's bullfighting paintings were exhibited at the Museo Nacional Centro de Arte Reina Sofía, in Madrid, from June to August 1987.
