= La paloma de la paz =

Sculpture by Fernando Botero

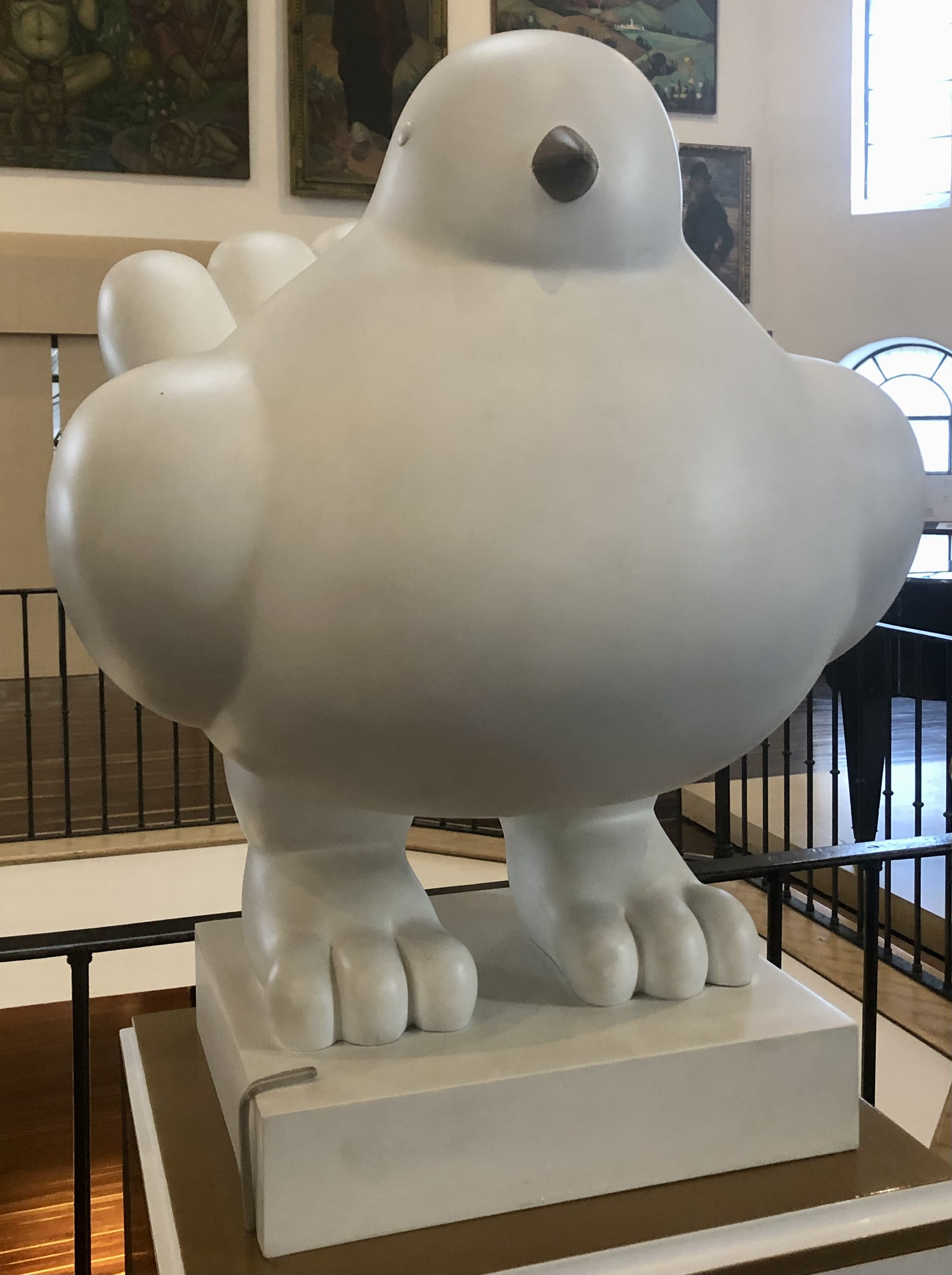
- Artist: Fernando Botero
- Year: 2016
- Type: Bronze sculpture
- Location: Casa de Nariño, Bogotá

La paloma de la paz (Spanish: The Peace Dove) is a sculpture by Fernando Botero, from 2016. It was created in response to the Colombian peace process. It was donated by the artist to the Government of Colombia to commemorate the signing of the peace agreement with the FARC-EP guerrilla group.

== Description ==
La paloma de la paz is a bronze sculpture depicting a peace dove developed by Botero in his signature style, known as Boterismo, that depicts people and figures in large exaggerated volume. The sculpture measures 70 centimeters in height from the base, and is painted all in white with the exception of the beak section which is painted in gold.

== History ==
On 24 September 2016, then Colombian President Juan Manuel Santos unveiled to the public La paloma de la paz sculpture that artist Fernando Botero had created as a gesture of support for the peace deal agreement reached between the government and the FARC-EP guerrilla group. Botero, who was not present in the unveiling ceremony, included a note in Spanish that read:

I wanted to give this gift to my country to express my support and solidarity with this process that will provide a future of hope and promise to all Colombians. Congratulations for Colombia!

The sculpture remained within the Casa de Nariño until the last days of the presidency of Juan Manuel Santos before being transferred to the National Museum of Colombia in a ceremony that was led by first lady María Clemencia Rodríguez Múnera. According to Martin Santos, son of President Juan Manuel Santos, then president-elect Ivan Duque had requested the sculpture removed from the Casa de Nariño during the transition process.

During the 2022 Colombian presidential election, both second round presidential nominees, Gustavo Petro and Rodolfo Hernández vowed to return the sculpture to the Casa de Nariño. For the inauguration of Gustavo Petro, the organizing team had requested that the sculpture be present during the ceremony however Ivan Duque, citing safety concerns, did not grant permission for the sculpture to be moved to the venue despite the organizing team having received the necessary permissions and acquiring a 24 hour insurance policy for the sculpture.

On 1 September 2022, the sculpture was transferred back to the Casa de Nariño, however the sculpture remained as part of the permanent collection of the National Museum.

During the funeral ceremonies of Fernando Botero in Colombia, the sculpture accompanied the coffin of Botero while lying in repose in the National Capitol of Colombia.

On 10 October 2023, the National Council of Cultural Heritage of Colombia voted to declare the sculpture as an asset of cultural interest for the nation.

La paloma de la paz was publicly exhibited during the 2023 edition of ARTBO, Colombia's largest art fair.

== Significance and legacy ==
Botero's Paloma de la paz has been seen by Colombians as a symbol of support for the peace process between the national government and FARC-EP guerrilla group. When then President Juan Manuel Santos unveiled the sculpture to the nation, he was spearheading the campaign for Colombians to approve of the peace agreement through a referendum. During the unveiling ceremony, Santos stated that he hoped that the sculpture "will inspire millions of Colombians to say yes to the end of the war". Weeks later, the referendum concluded with Colombians voting against the ratification of the peace agreement.
