= Botero (film) =

2018 documentary film

- Directed by: Don Millar
- Screenplay by: Don Millar; Hart Snider
- Produced by: Eric Hogan; Joe Trucker
- Cinematography: Johan Legraie; Joe Tucker
- Edited by: Hart Snider
- Music by: David Bertok
- Production company: Hogan Millar Media
- Release date: 25 October 2018 (Morelia)
- Running time: 1 hr. 22 mins
- Country: Canada
- Languages: English, Spanish

Botero is a 2018 Canadian documentary film directed and co-written by Don Millar. The film profiles the life and art of Colombian maestro Fernando Botero, known for his distinctive voluminous figures and international exhibitions. It features exclusive access to the artist and his family, alongside interviews with historians and curators across multiple continents.

== Synopsis ==
Fernando Botero was a Colombian artist known for his distinctive style featuring exaggerated volumes in figures and objects. His paintings and sculptures have been exhibited internationally, including large shows in China that drew more than one million visitors. Botero's works span a wide range of subjects, from everyday life and portraits to clergy and political figures. Several museums in Colombia bear his name, and his works have been displayed alongside artists such as Pablo Picasso. In interviews, Botero described painting as central to his life.

== Cast ==
- Fernando Botero as Self
- Miriam Basilio as Self
- Juan Carlos Botero as Self
- Lina Botero as Self
- Rosalind Krauss as Self
- Sandro Manzo
- Dorothy Canning Miller as Self (archive footage)
- David Nahmad as Self
- Sophia Vari as Self
- Fernando Botero Zea as Self
- Gloria Zea as Self (archive footage)

== Production ==
Director Don Millar was inspired to make Botero after witnessing the artist's universal appeal, particularly at a Beijing exhibition, and being struck by Botero's enigmatic presence. With the help of Botero's daughter Lina, who secured access to the otherwise private artist, Millar spent about 19 months on production and post-production. The process revealed to him Botero's enduring enthusiasm for learning and creativity, which became central to the film. The film was produced by Joe Tucker, with music composed by David Bertok.

== Release ==
Botero had its world premiere at the Morelia International Film Festival on October, 2018. In 2019, the film was subsequently screened in several film festivals in the United States, including Palm Springs International Film Festival, Miami International Film Festival, Seattle International Film Festival, Roschester International Film Festival and Suncreen Film Festival.

== Reception ==
On review aggregator Rotten Tomatoes, the film has an approval rating of 75% based on 8 reviews.

Frank Scheck of The Hollywood Reporter praised the film as “informative and entertaining,” highlighting its accessible introduction to Botero's life and work, but noted it was “hardly objective” given its celebratory tone and close ties to the artist's family. He observed that while the documentary compellingly explores key moments such as the loss of Botero's son and the Medellín bombing, its hagiographic approach limits deeper critical insight.

Paul Parcellin of Film Threat gives Botero 8 out of 10, describing it as “an enjoyable experience that presents an appealing overview of the artist’s life and works.” He highlights Botero's rags-to-riches journey and the moving segment on the death of his son, while noting that dissenting voices like Rosalind Krauss balance what might otherwise be a “Botero love-in.”
