= Fernando Botero =

Colombian painter and sculptor (1932–2023)

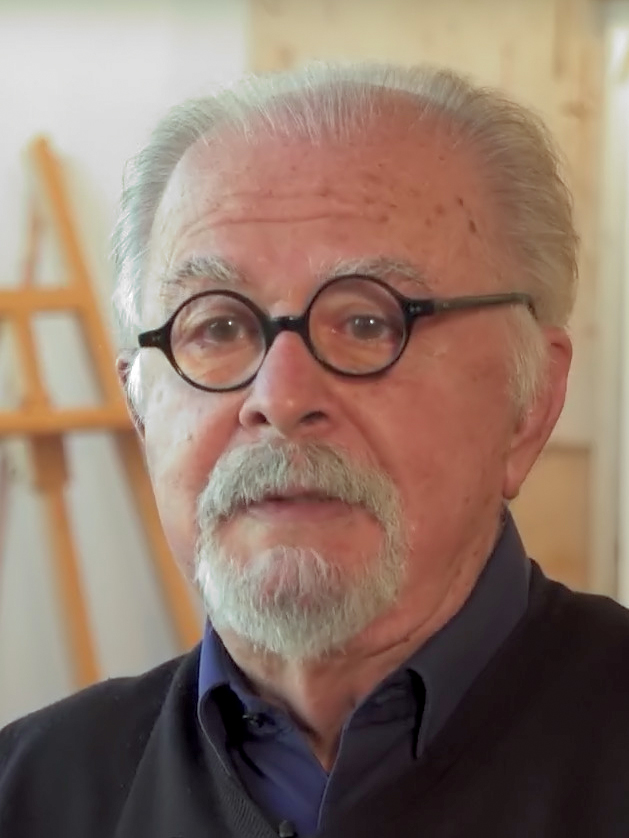
- Botero in 2018
- Born: Fernando Botero Angulo; 19 April 1932; Medellín, Colombia
- Died: 15 September 2023 (aged 91); Monte Carlo, Monaco
- Known for: Painter; sculptor
- Notable work: Mona Lisa, Age Twelve (1959); Pope Leo X (after Raphael) (1964); The Presidential Family (1967); The Dancers (1987); Death of Pablo Escobar (1999); La paloma de la paz (2016)
- Spouse: Gloria Zea (m. 1955; div. 1960) Cecilia Zambrano (m. 1964; div. 1975) Sophia Vari (m. 1978; died 2023)
- Children: 4, including Fernando

Signature
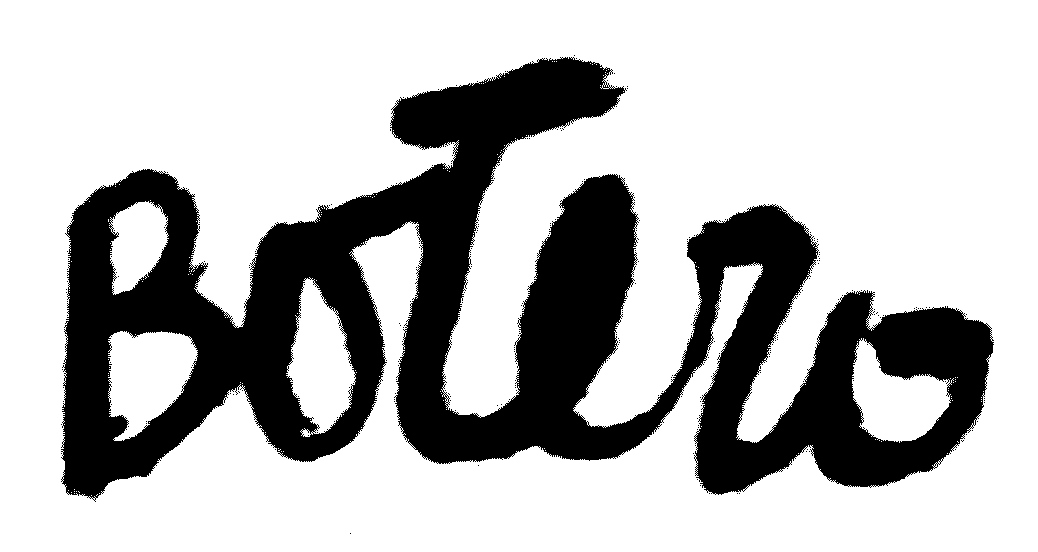

Fernando Botero Angulo (19 April 1932 – 15 September 2023) was a Colombian painter and sculptor. His signature style, also known as "Boterismo", depicts people and figures in large, exaggerated volume, which can represent political criticism or humor, depending on the piece. He was considered the most recognized and quoted artist from Latin America in his lifetime, and his art can be found in highly visible places around the world, such as Park Avenue in New York City and the Champs-Élysées in Paris, at different times.

Self-styled "the most Colombian of Colombian artists", Botero came to national prominence when he won the first prize at the Salón de Artistas Colombianos in 1958. He began creating sculptures after moving to Paris in 1973, achieving international recognition with exhibitions around the world by the 1990s. His art is collected by many major international museums, corporations, and private collectors, sometimes selling for millions of dollars. In 2012, he received the International Sculpture Center's Lifetime Achievement in Contemporary Sculpture Award.

== Biography ==
=== Early life ===
Fernando Botero was born in Medellín, Colombia, on 19 April 1932. His father, David Botero, a salesman who traveled by horseback, died when Fernando was four. His mother, Flora Angulo, worked as a seamstress to support the family. An uncle took a major role in his life. Although isolated from art as presented in museums and other cultural institutes, Botero was influenced by the Baroque style of the colonial churches and the city life of Medellín while growing up.

Botero received his primary education at the Ateneo Antioqueño and, thanks to a scholarship, he continued his secondary education at the Jesuit School of Bolívar. In 1944, Botero's uncle sent him to a school for matadors for two years. Some of his earlier drawings were inspired by the bullfight scene. He sold his first painting for two pesos, thanks to a merchant who allowed him to display it in the window of his shop. He spoke with the Los Angeles Times, during an interview in November 2000, and explained that he lost the money he got for the painting and thus, his brothers never believed him. His love of drawing nudes caused problems with his Roman Catholic education. He was expelled from school after defending Pablo Picasso's art in an essay. In 1948, Botero at the age of 16 had his first illustrations published in the Sunday supplement of El Colombiano, one of the most important newspapers in Medellín. He used the money he was paid to attend high school at the Liceo de Marinilla de Antioquia.

=== Career ===
Botero's work was first exhibited in 1948, in a group show along with other artists from the region. From 1949 to 1950, Botero worked as a set designer, before moving to Bogotá in 1951. Young Botero also worked as a newspaper illustrator to support his artistic interests and before attending San Fernando Academy. The Pérez Art Museum Miami acquired a still life picture of Botero's early days of career depicting apples, an influence of European art historical movements and 20th-century painters. His first one-man show was held at the Galería Leo Matiz in Bogotá, a few months after his arrival.

In 1952, using his gallery earnings, Botero sailed to Europe. He arrived in Barcelona and then moved on to Madrid. In Madrid, Botero studied at the Academia de San Fernando and was a frequent visitor to the Prado Museum, where he copied works by Goya and Velázquez. He sold his copies on the streets to make money.

In 1953, Botero moved to Paris, where he spent most of his time in the Louvre, studying the works there. He lived in Florence from 1953 to 1954, studying the works of Renaissance masters. Later in life, he lived most of the time in Paris, but spent one month a year in his native city of Medellín. He had more than 50 exhibitions in major cities worldwide, and his work commands selling prices in the millions of dollars. In 1958, he won the ninth edition of the Salón de Artistas Colombianos.

Around 1964, Botero made his first attempts to create sculptures. Due to financial constraints preventing him from working with bronze, he made his sculptures with acrylic resin and sawdust. A notable example during this time was Small Head (Bishop) in 1964, a sculpture painted with great realism. The material was too porous, so he abandoned this method. He returned to sculpture "with enthusiasm" in Italy in the mid-1970s and exhibited his characteristic bronze sculptures for the first time at the Grand Palais in Paris in 1977. He exhibited selected paintings, drawings, and sculptures at Louis Stern Galleries in Beverly Hills in 1992.

On 10 June 1995, while his son Fernando Botero Zea was serving as Minister of Defence, a bomb containing 10 kg of dynamite was placed underneath one of Botero's bronze sculptures on display in Medellín's Plaza San Antonio. The resulting explosion killed 23 people and injured 200 more; the perpetrators were never identified. A horrified Botero decided that the damaged sculpture should be left in place as a "monument to the country's imbecility and criminality" and donated an intact replica to stand alongside it.

In 2004, Botero exhibited a series of 27 drawings and 23 paintings dealing with the violence in Colombia from 1999 through 2004. He donated the works to the National Museum of Colombia, where they were first exhibited.

Abu Ghraib, 2005, oil on canvas. Botero painted the abuses of Abu Ghraib between 2004 and 2005 as a permanent accusation.

In 2005, Botero gained considerable attention for his Abu Ghraib series, which was exhibited first in Europe. He based the works on reports of United States forces' abuses of prisoners at Abu Ghraib prison during the Iraq War. Beginning with an idea he had had on a plane journey, Botero produced more than 85 paintings and 100 drawings in exploring this concept and "painting out the poison". The series was exhibited at two United States locations in 2007, including Washington, D.C.. Botero said he would not sell any of the works, but would donate them to museums. In 2009, the Berkeley Art Museum acquired (as a gift from the artist) 56 paintings and drawings from the Abu Ghraib series, which can be seen online. Selections from the series have been regularly included in the museum's annual Art for Human Rights exhibitions.

In 2006, after having focused exclusively on the Abu Ghraib series for over 14 months, Botero returned to the themes of his early life such as the family and motherhood. In his Une Famille Botero represented the Colombian family, a subject often painted in the 1970s and 1980s. In his Maternity, Botero repeated a composition he had already painted in 2003.

In 2008, he exhibited the works of his The Circus collection, featuring 20 works in oil and watercolor. In a 2010 interview, Botero said that he was ready for other subjects: "After all this, I always return to the simplest things: still lifes."

== Style ==
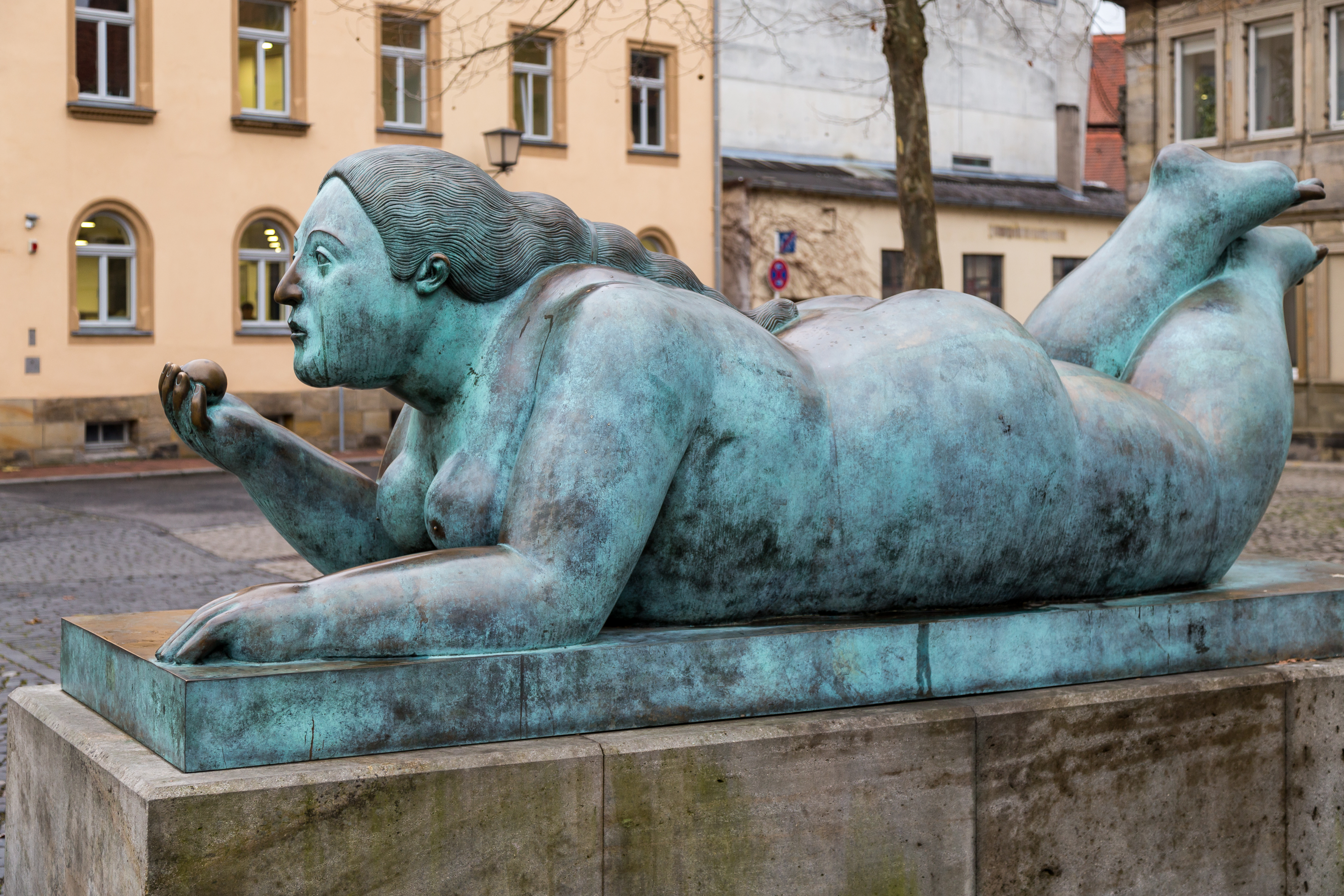
Woman with fruit, Bamberg, Germany

While his work includes still-lifes and landscapes, Botero concentrated on situational portraiture. His paintings and sculptures are united by their proportionally exaggerated, or "fat" figures, as he once referred to them.

Botero explained his use of these "large people", as they are often called by critics, in the following way:

An artist is attracted to certain kinds of form without knowing why. You adopt a position intuitively; only later do you attempt to rationalize or even justify it.

Botero's work, Still Life with Mandolin, marked the beginning of his stylistic development in painting enlarged figures. It became his trademark. During a November 2000 interview, he said about it:

I was drawing a mandolin, and I made the sound hole very small, which made the mandolin look gigantic. I saw that making the details small made the form monumental. So, in my figures, the eyes, the mouth are all small and the exterior form is huge.

During 1956–1958, Botero had exhibitions in both Washington, D.C. and Mexico City. Despite selling almost all of his paintings, he didn't gain favor of critics. His reputation improved after the New York Museum of Modern Art obtained his painting, Mona Lisa, Age Twelve, in 1961.

Though he spent only one month a year in Colombia, he considered himself the "most Colombian artist living", due to his isolation from the international trends of the art world.

== Donations ==
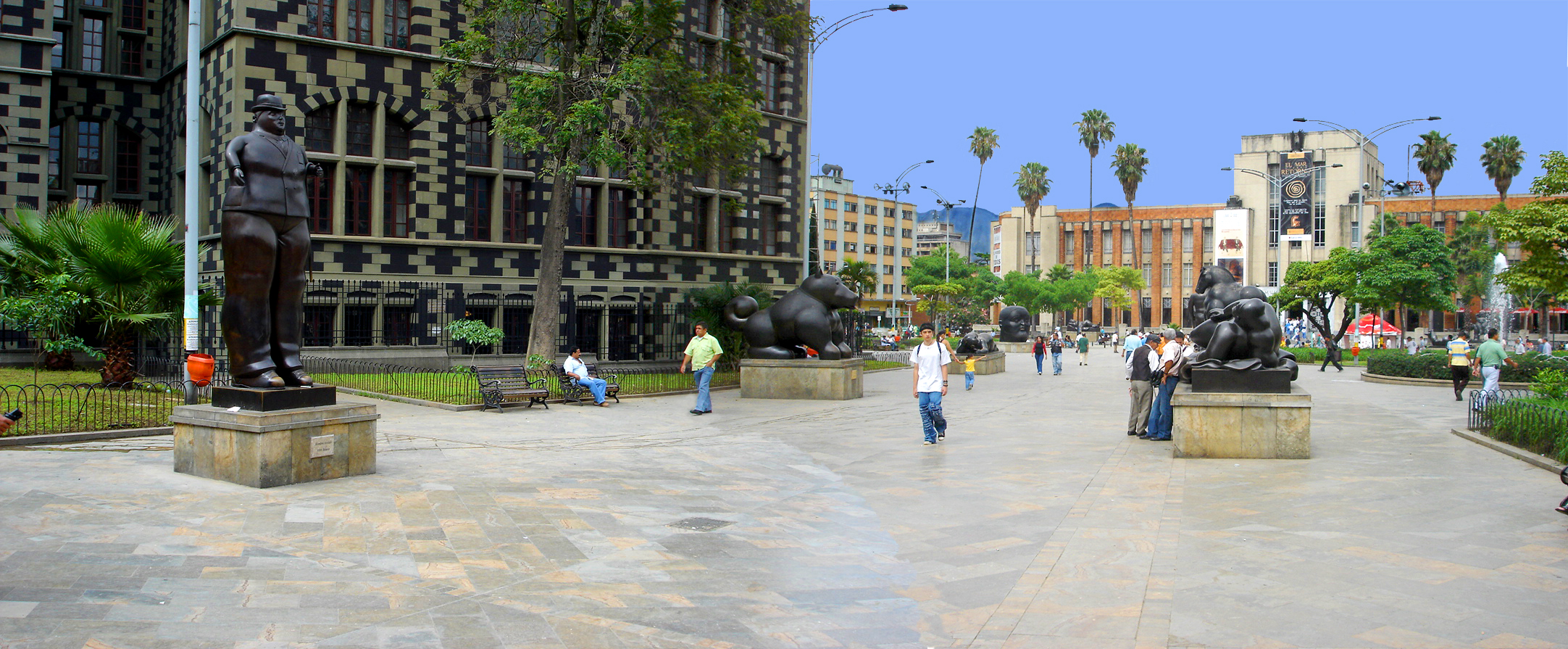
Botero Plaza in Botero's hometown of Medellín is a popular tourist site.

Botero donated a large number of artworks to museums in Bogotá and his hometown, Medellín. In 2000, Botero donated 123 pieces of his work and 85 pieces from his personal collection to the Museo Botero in Bogotá, including works by Chagall, Picasso, Robert Rauschenberg, and the French impressionists. He donated 119 pieces to the Museum of Antioquia, including 23 bronze sculptures for the square in front of the museum, which became known as Botero Plaza.

In response to the Colombian peace process, Botero sculpted and donated La paloma de la paz (2016) to the Government of Colombia to commemorate the signing and ratification of the agreement.

== Personal life and death ==
Botero was married three times. With his first wife, Gloria Zea (1935–2019), later director of the Colombian Institute of Culture (Colcultura), he had three children: Fernando, Lina, and Juan Carlos. They divorced in 1960 and, the following year, Botero moved to New York City, where he lived for a dozen years before settling in Paris.

In 1964 Botero began living with Cecilia Zambrano. They had a son, Pedro, who was killed in 1974 in a car accident when they were vacationing in Spain. While traveling between Seville and Córdoba, a truck lost control and crashed into their car. Pedro was four years old. Botero survived, but he lost the phalanx of the right little finger. Botero's work, Pedrito a Caballo, was inspired by his late son and was painted in the months following the accident. Botero and Zambrano separated in 1975.

His home city, Medellín, is also known for being the home of Pablo Escobar, Colombia's most famous drug lord. After the death of Escobar, Botero found out that two of his paintings were in Escobar's possession, and this angered him. Botero painted the death of Escobar on his paintings, The Death of Pablo Escobar, and Pablo Escobar Dead. Botero was kidnapped while in the city in 1994, and in 1995, one of his statues, The Bird of Peace, was blown up in a bomb attack.

Botero's third wife was the Greek artist Sophia Vari with whom he resided in Paris and Monte Carlo until her death on 5 May 2023. The couple also had a house in Pietrasanta, Italy. Botero's 80th birthday was commemorated with an exhibition of his works at Pietrasanta.

Botero died from complications of pneumonia on 15 September 2023, at age 91, in Monaco.

== Art market ==
Botero most expensive painting in the art market was The Musicians (1979), who sold by $5,132,000 at Christie's, on 9 November 2023.

His most expensive sculpture was Horse (1992), sold by $4,9 million at Sotheby's New York, on 20 November 2024.

== Popular culture ==
Botero's 1964 painting Pope Leo X (after Raphael) has found a second life as a popular internet meme. It is typically seen with the caption "y tho".

Mario Vargas Llosa's 2023 novel Le dedico mi silencio uses Botero's 1979 painting Los músicos as its cover illustration.

His life and work were the subject of the 2018 Canadian documentary Botero, directed by Don Millar.

== Gallery ==
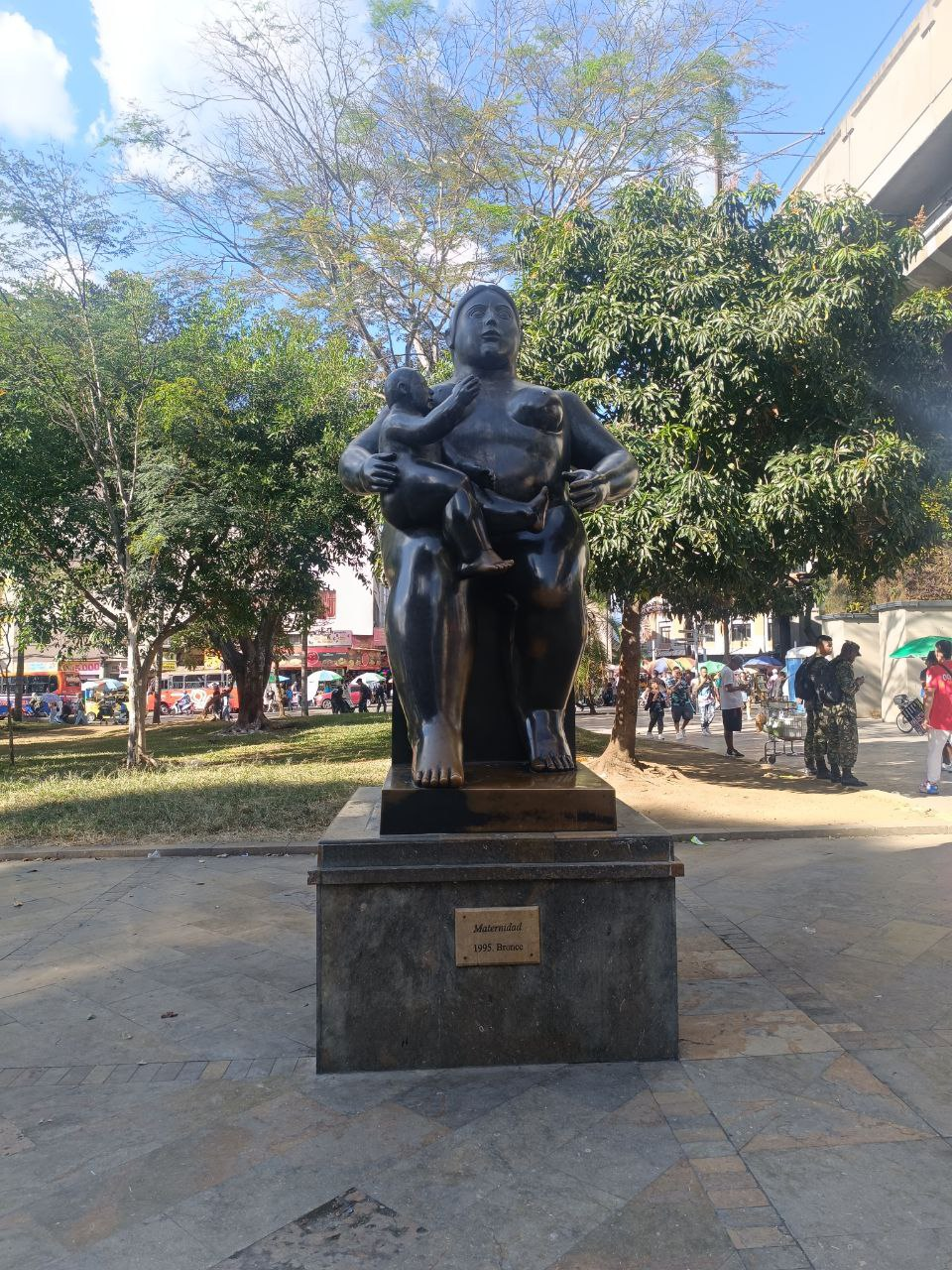
"Maternity" 1995 exhibition in Medellín

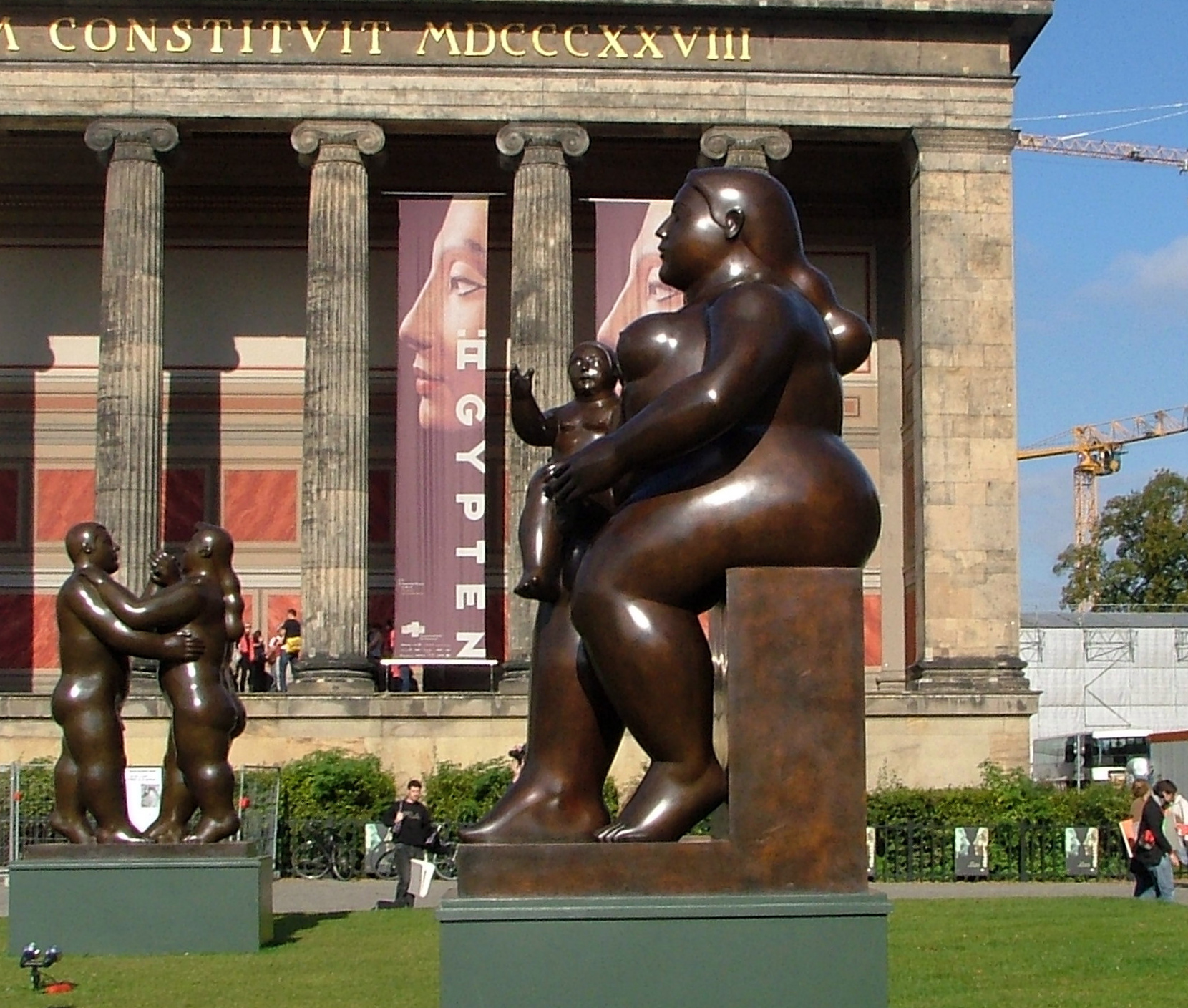
Exhibition in Berlin

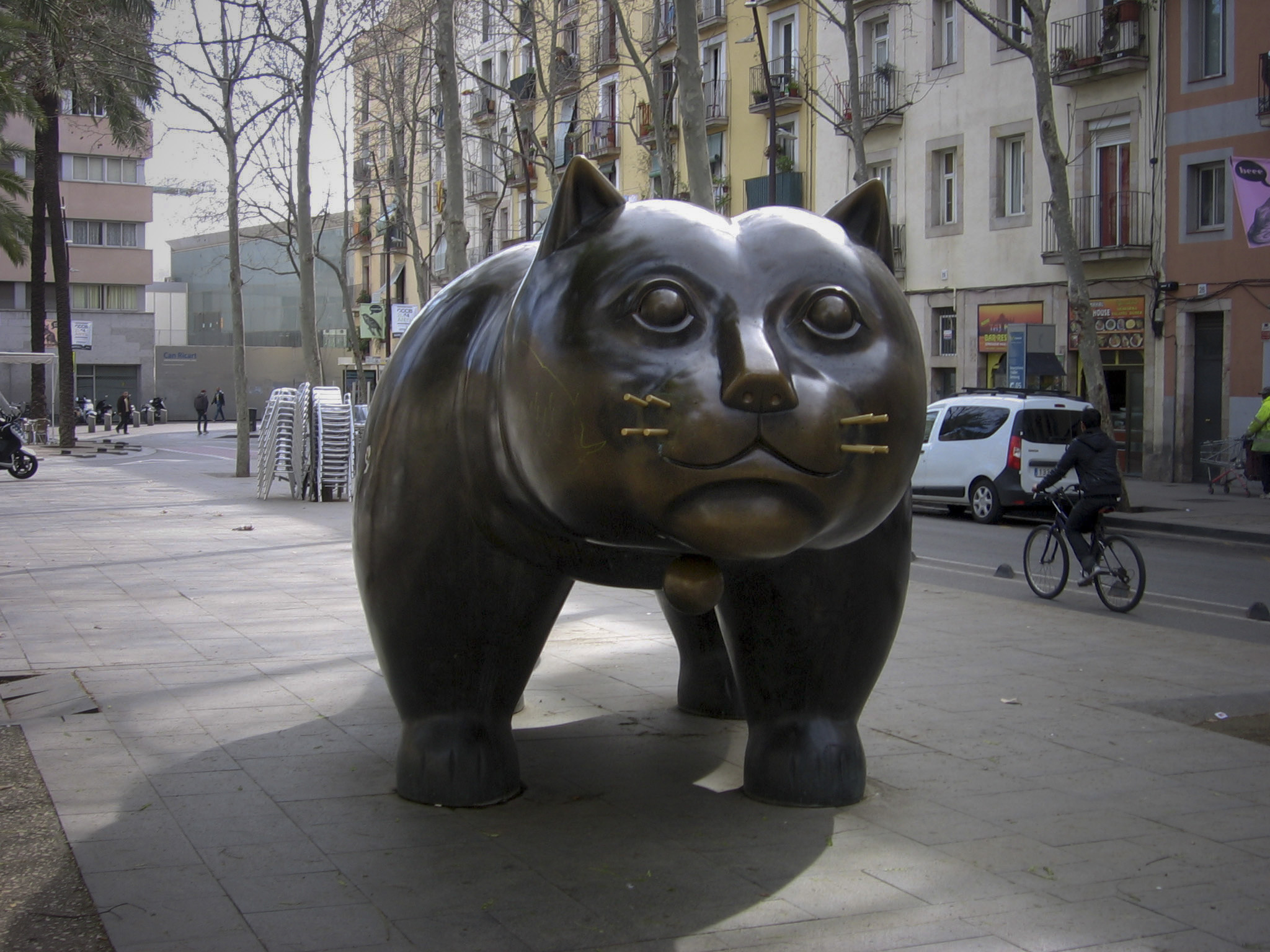
Cat, 1990, Barcelona

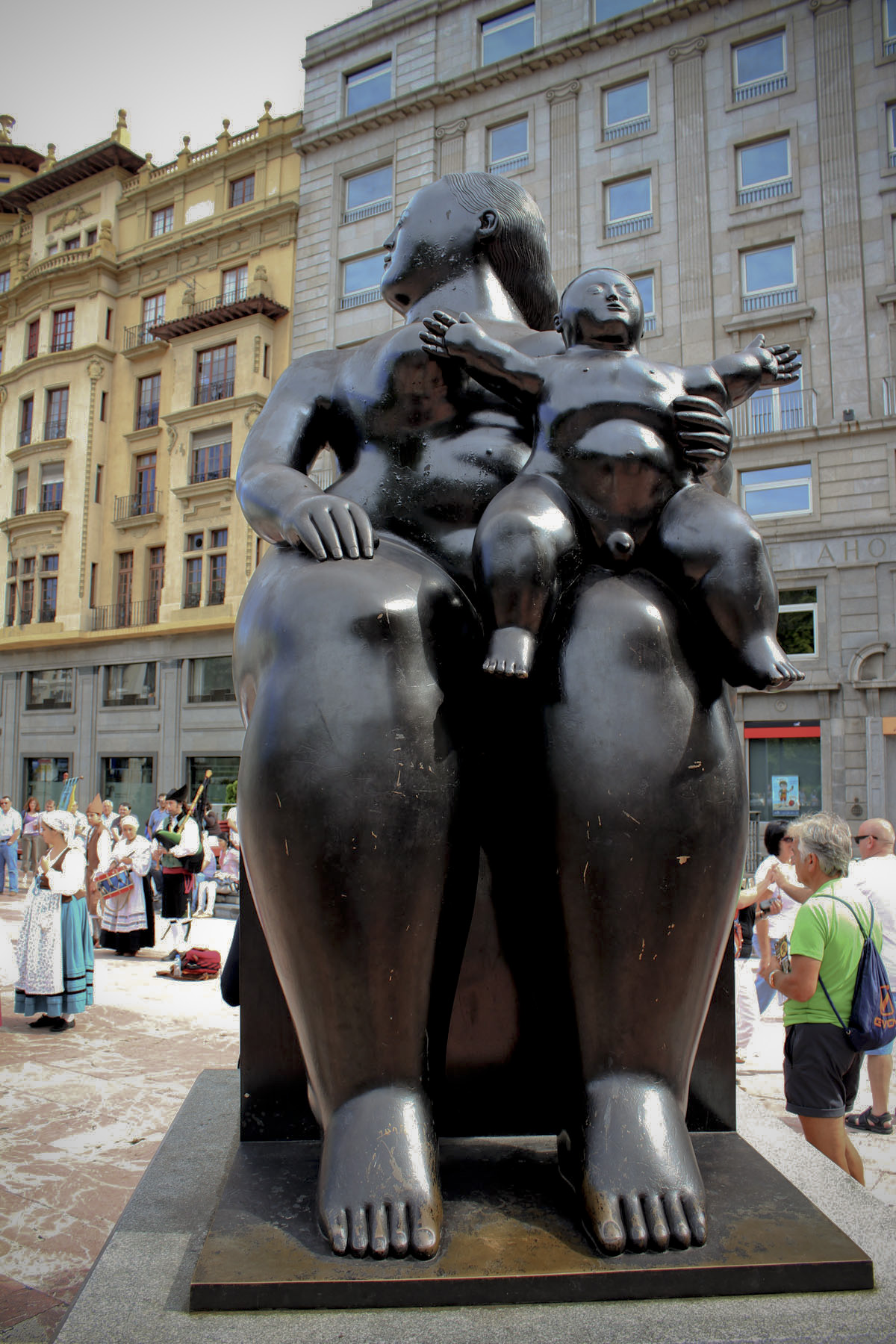
Motherhood, Oviedo

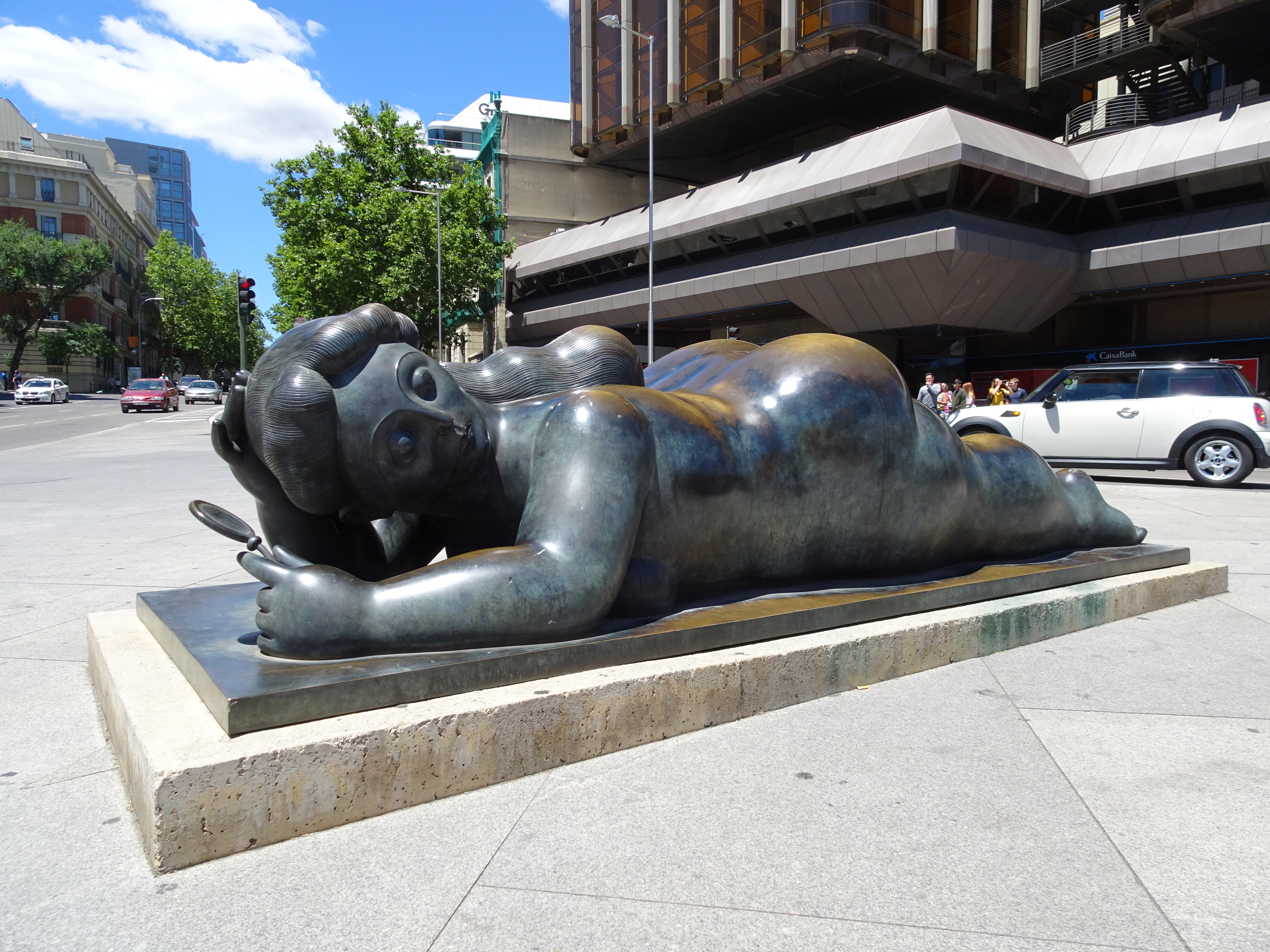
Woman with Mirror, 1987

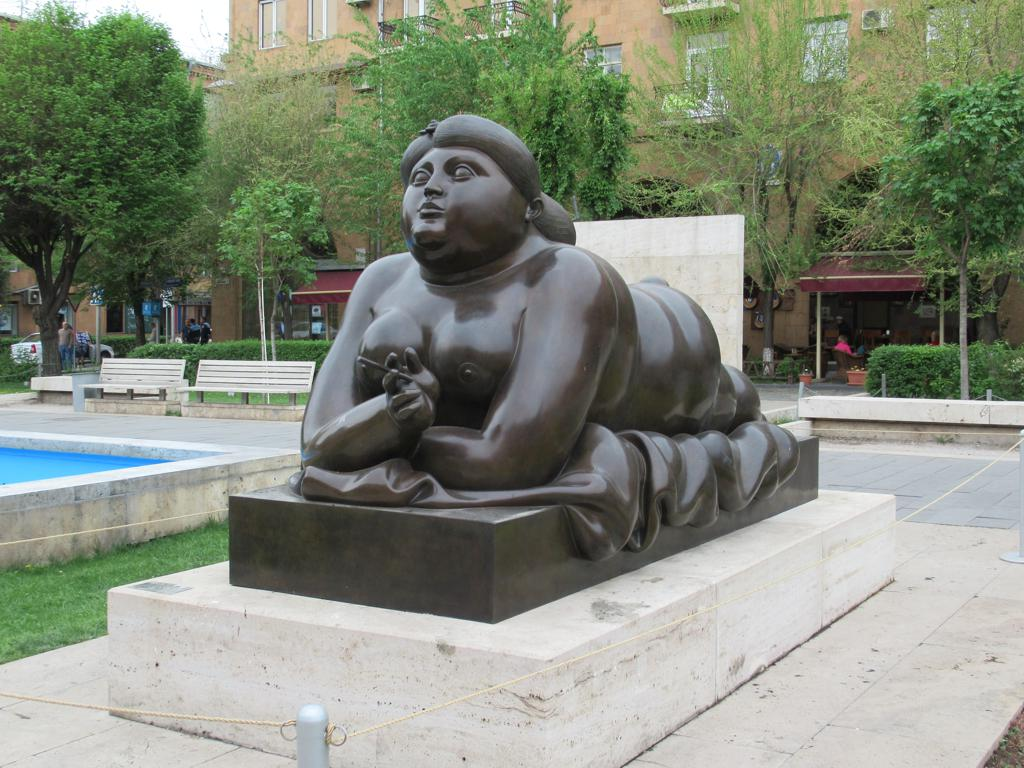
Woman with cigarette, Yerevan

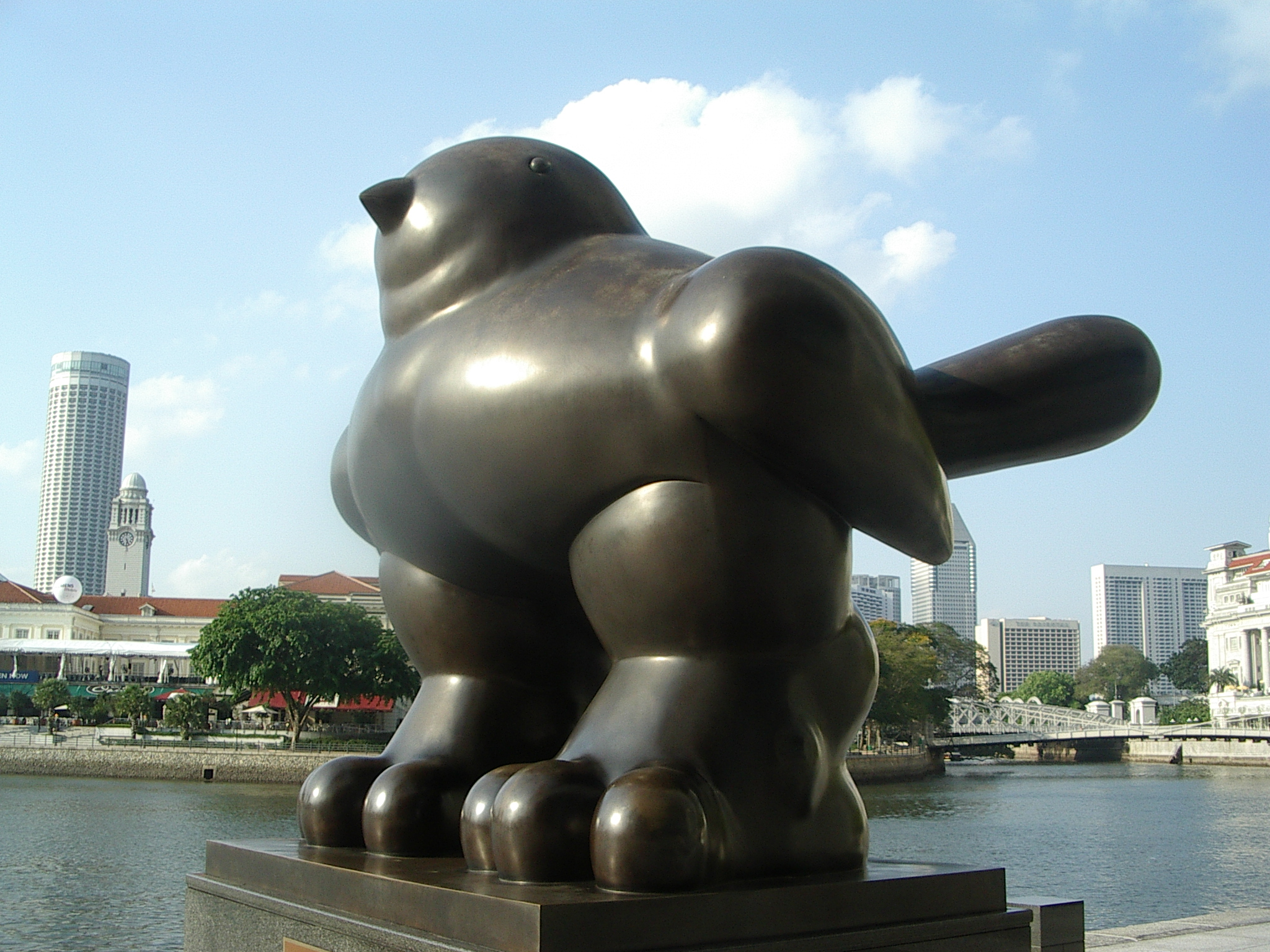
Bird, 1990, in front of UOB Plaza, Singapore

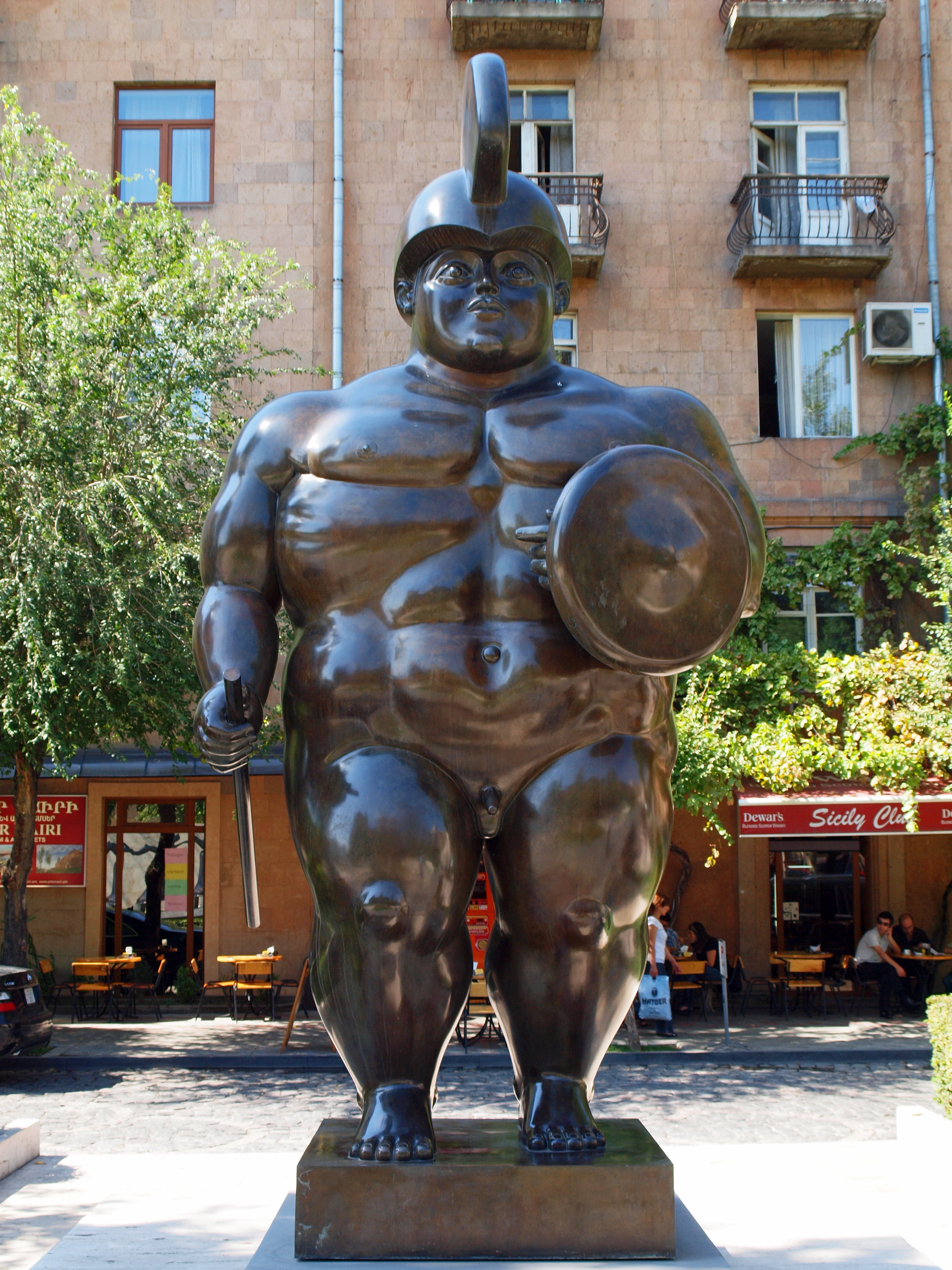
Roman Warrior, Cafesjian Museum of Art, Yerevan

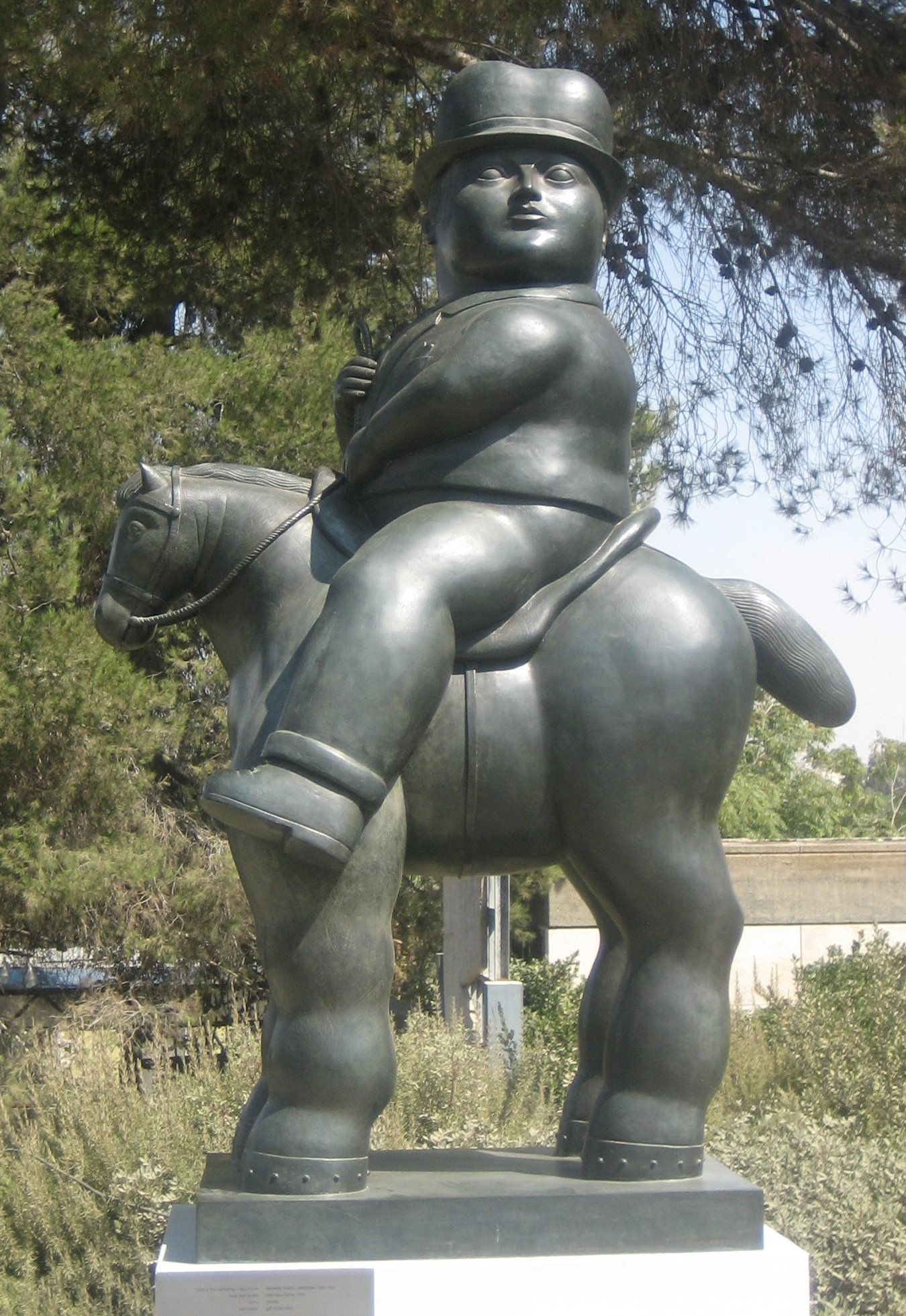
Man on Horse, bronze, 1992, at the Israel Museum, Jerusalem

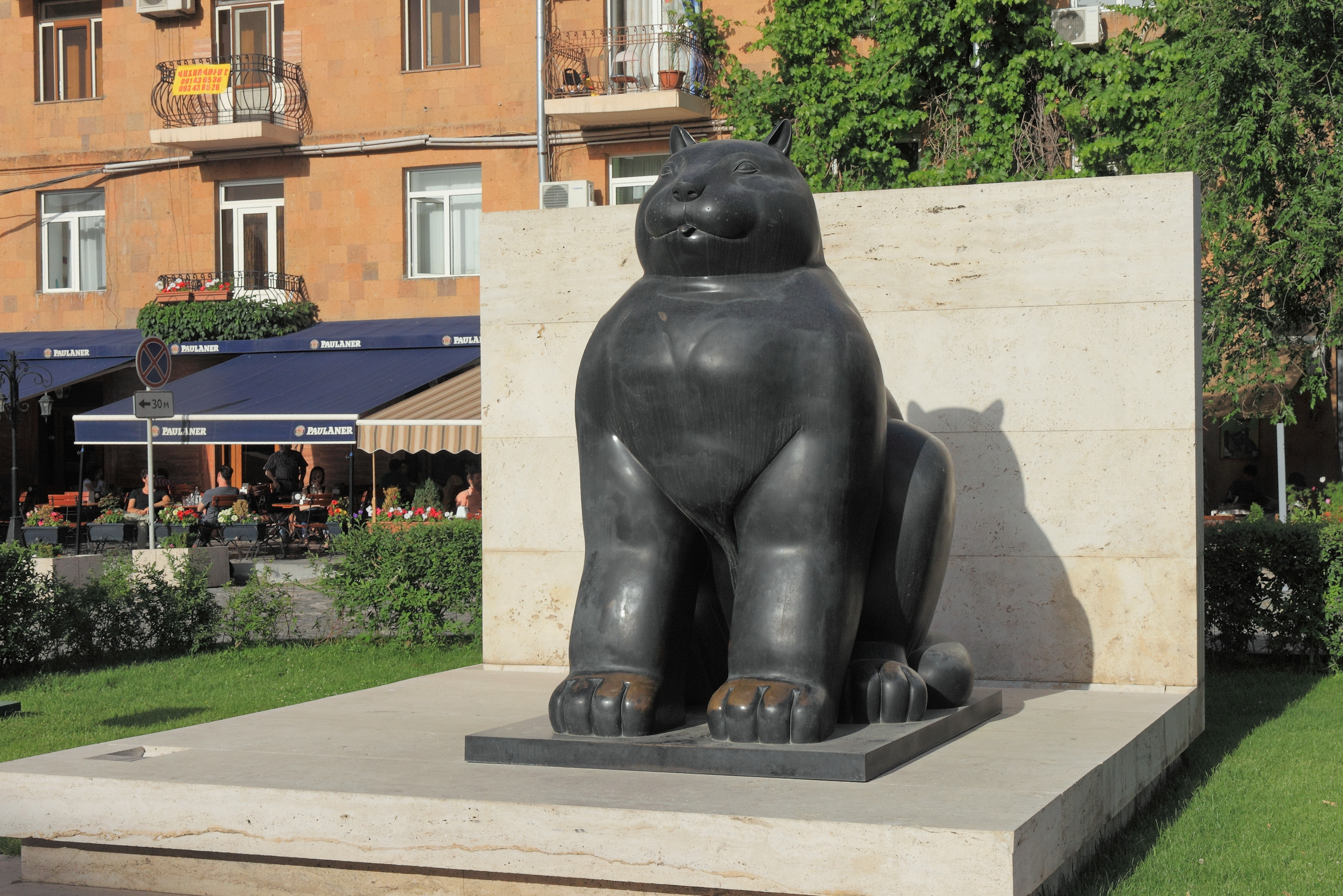
The Cat, Yerevan

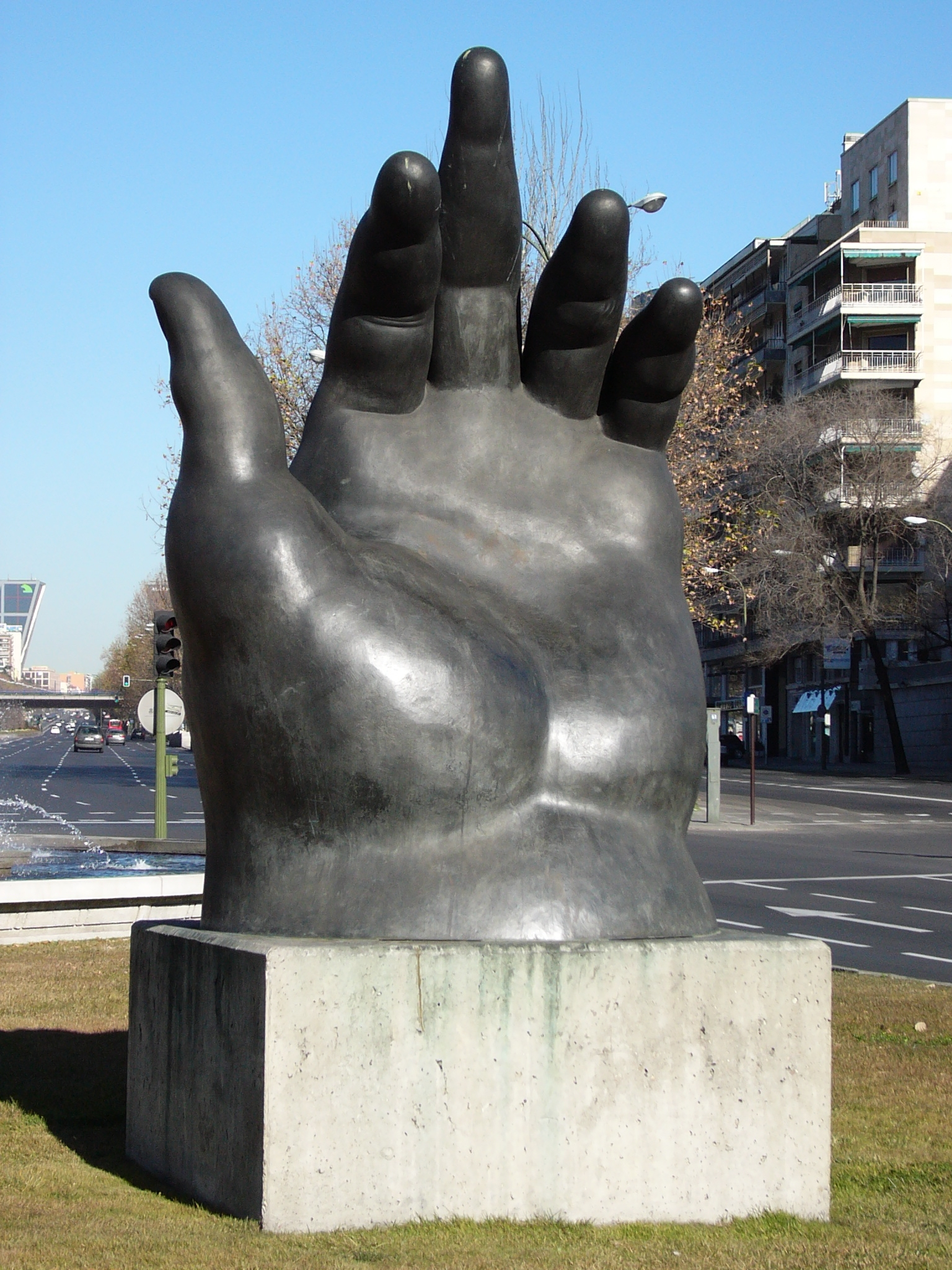
The Hand, Madrid

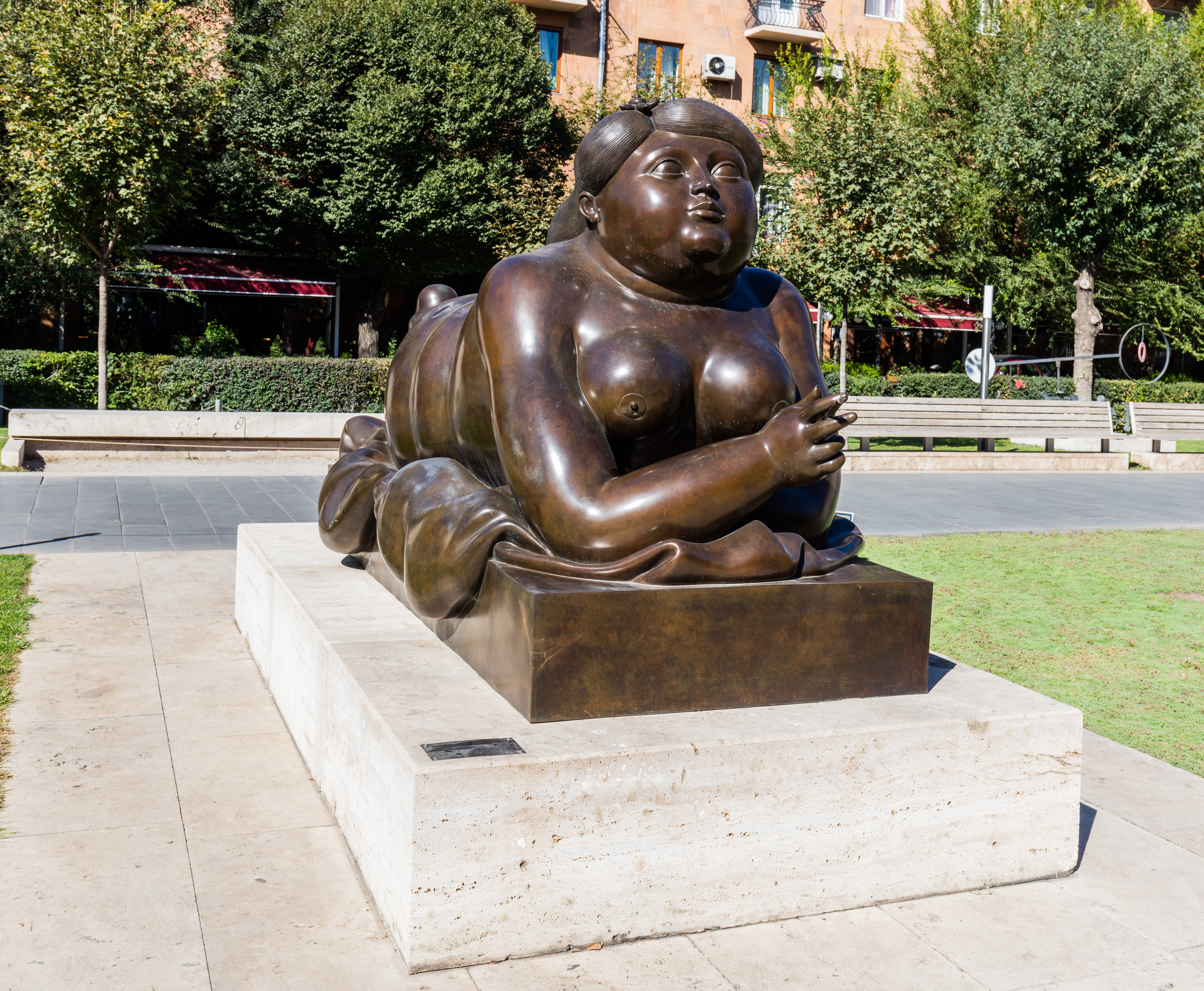
Smoking woman, Cafesjian Museum of Art, Yerevan

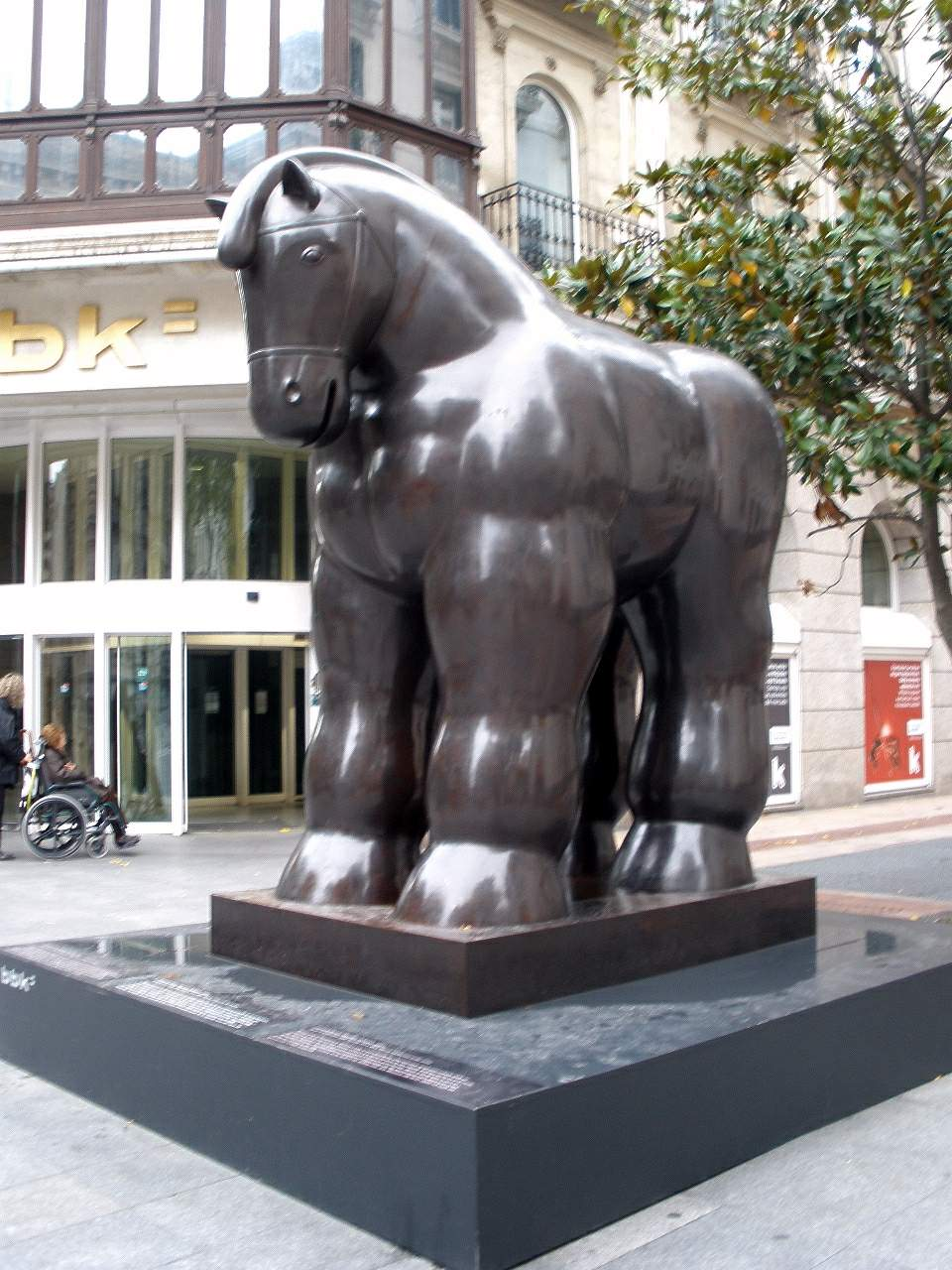
Caballo con bridas, Bilbao

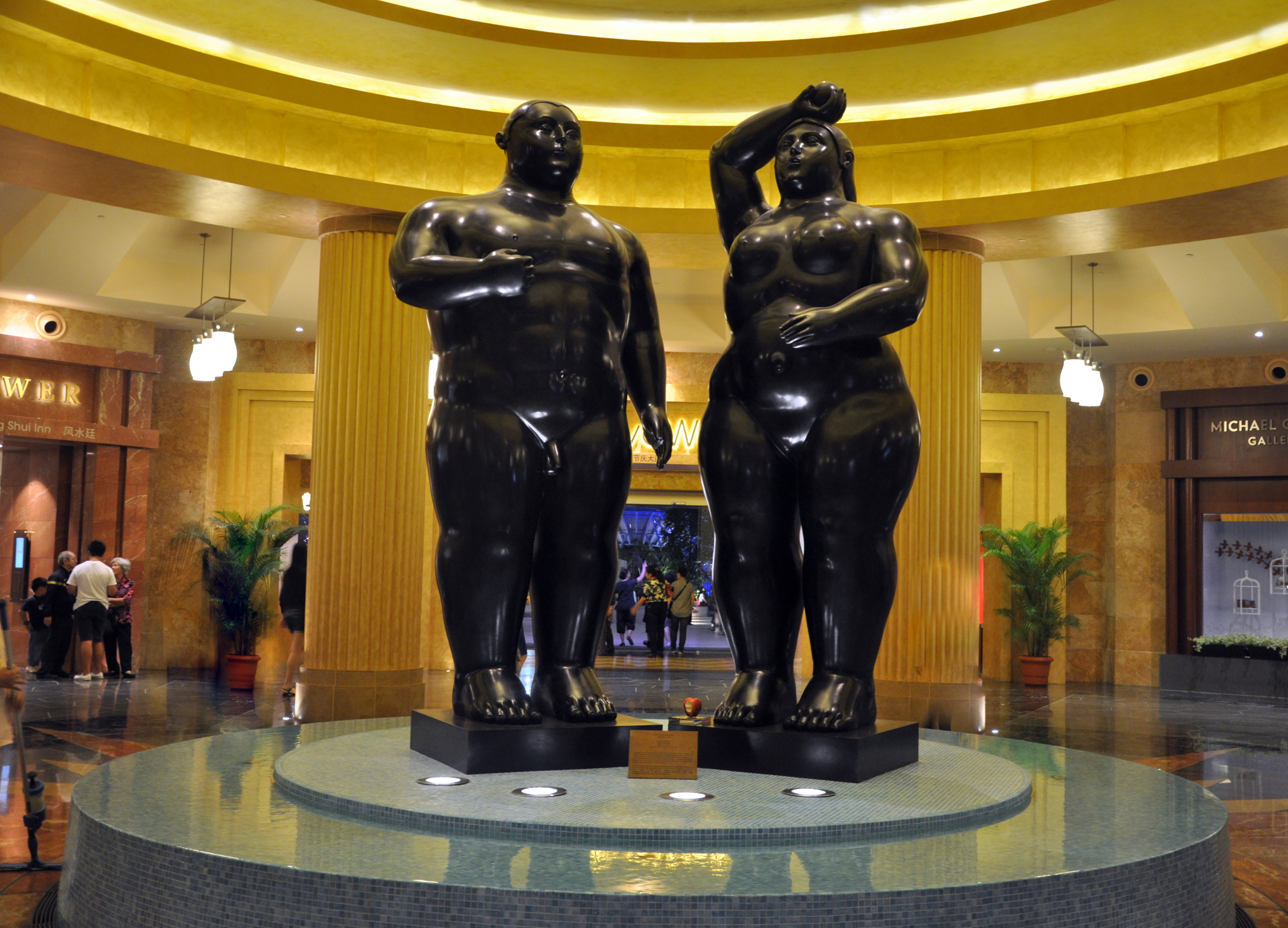
Adam and Eve, near Crockfords Tower at Resorts World Sentosa, Singapore

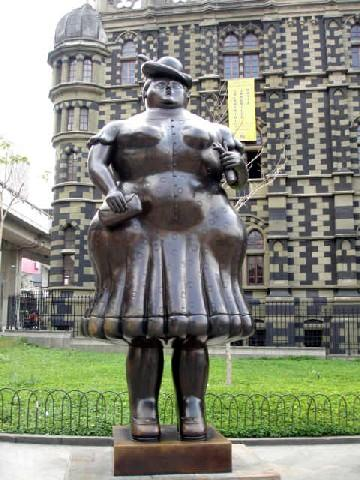
Lady, Medellín

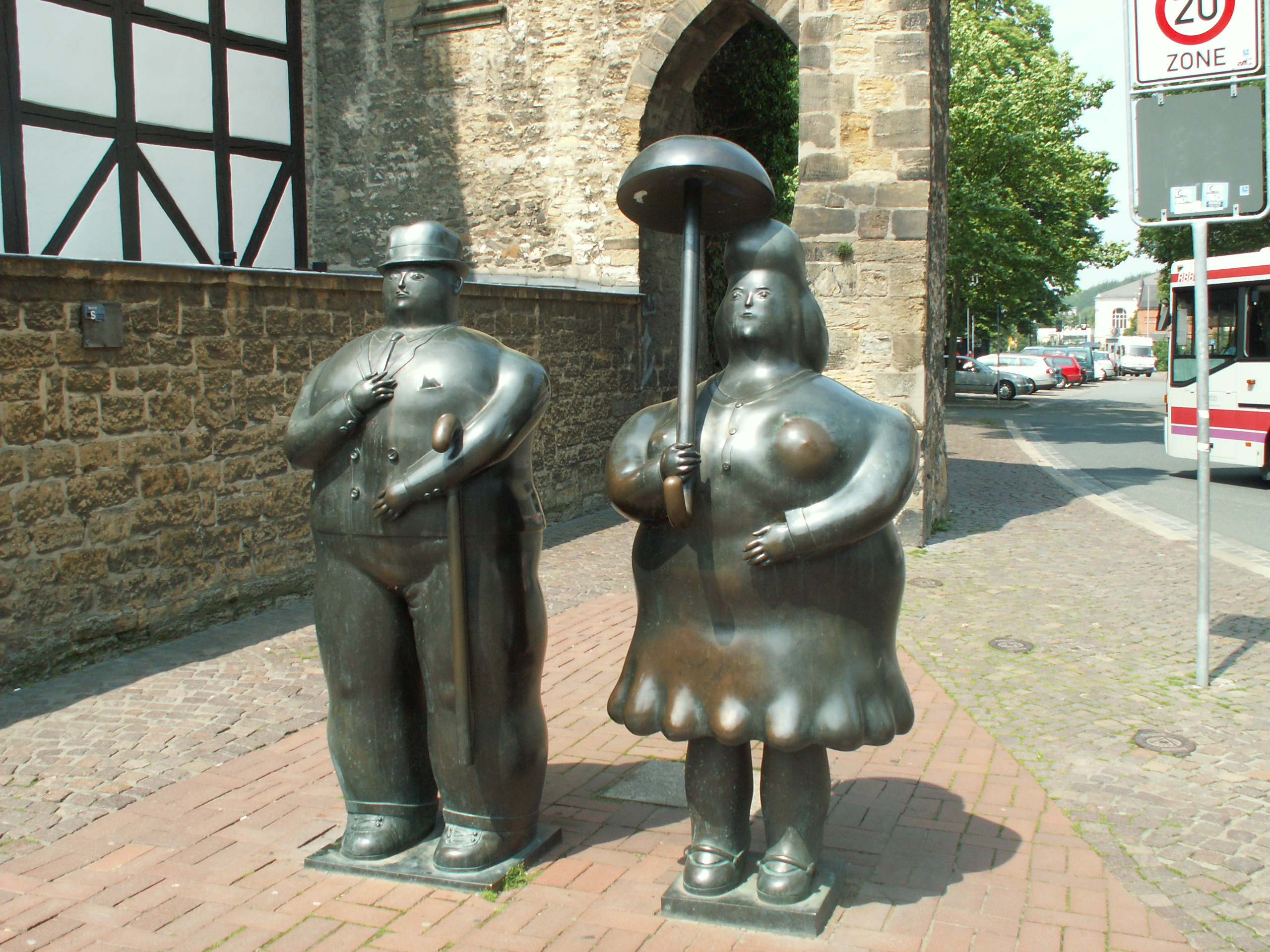
Sculpture by Fernando Botero in Goslar

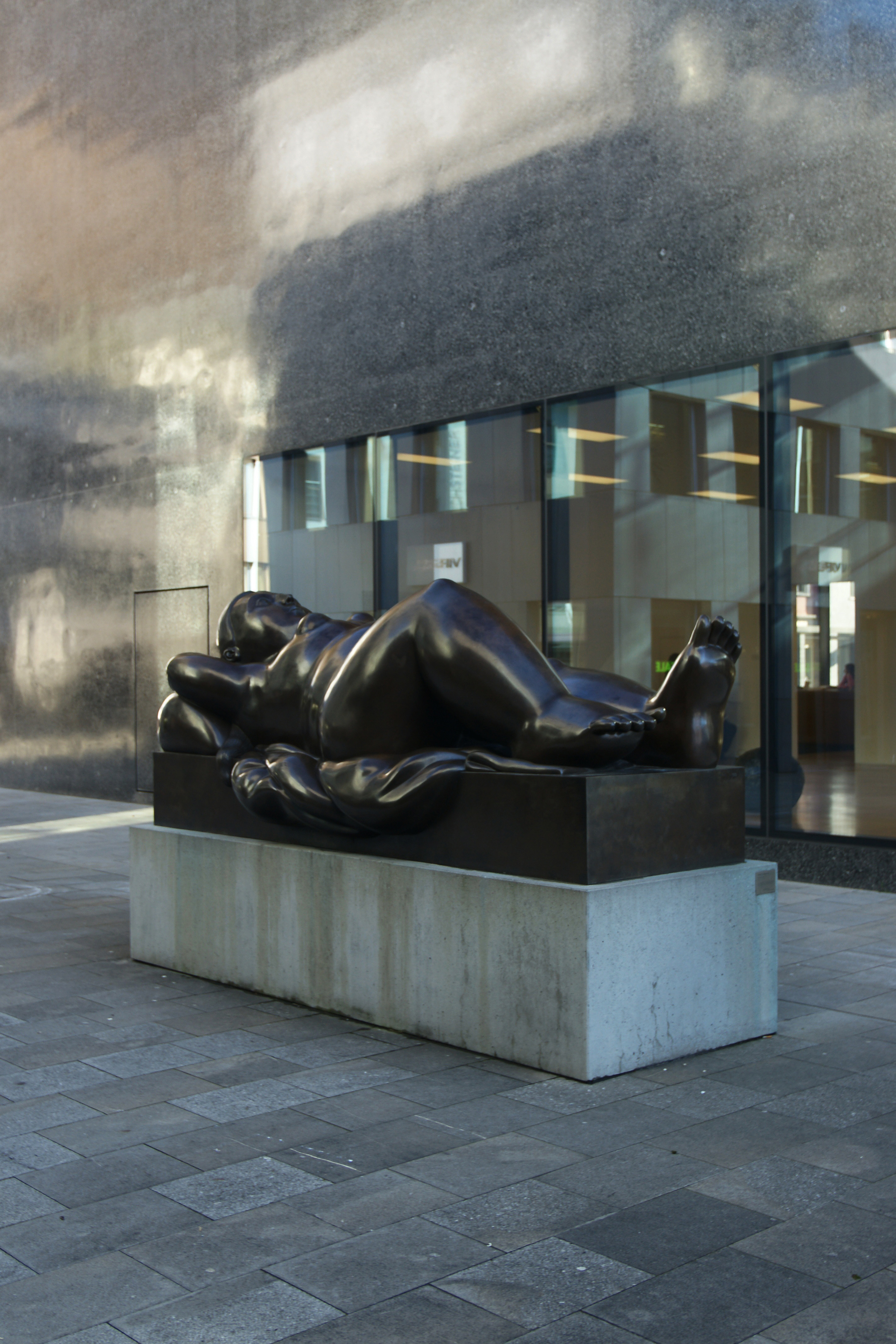
Sculpture by Fernando Botero in front of the Kunstmuseum Liechtenstein, Vaduz

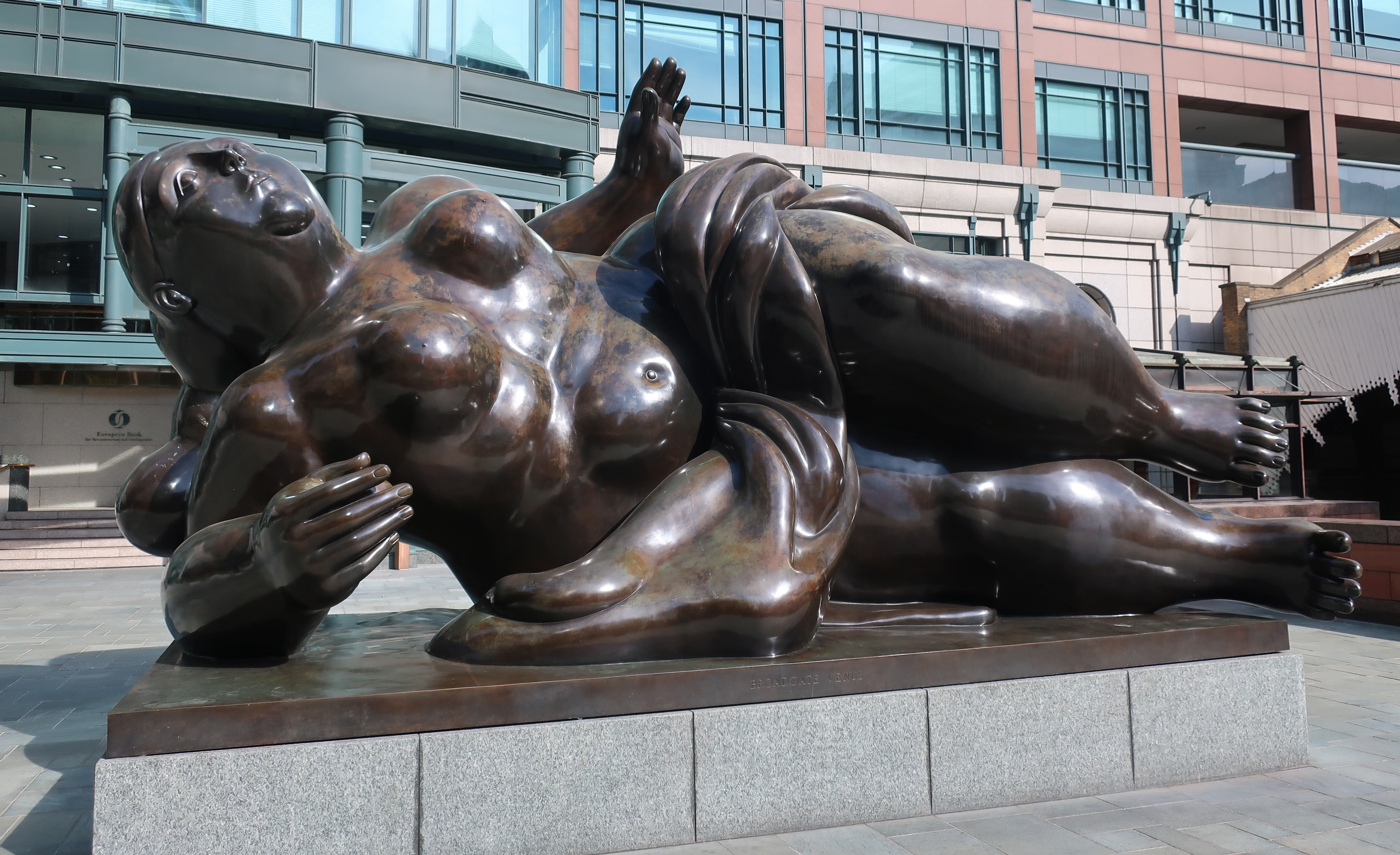
Broadgate Venus, 1989, London

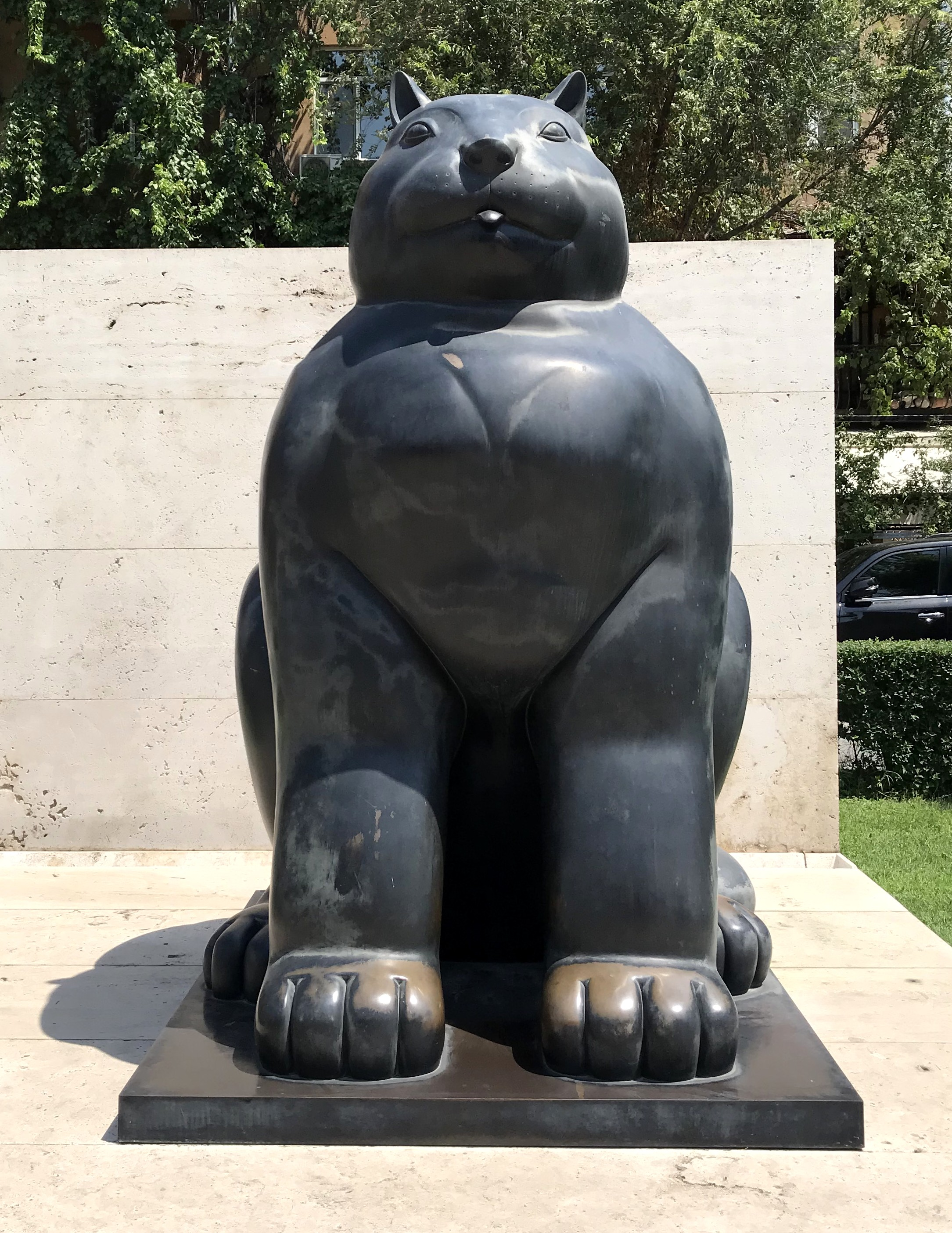
Cat, Cafesjian Museum of Art, Yerevan

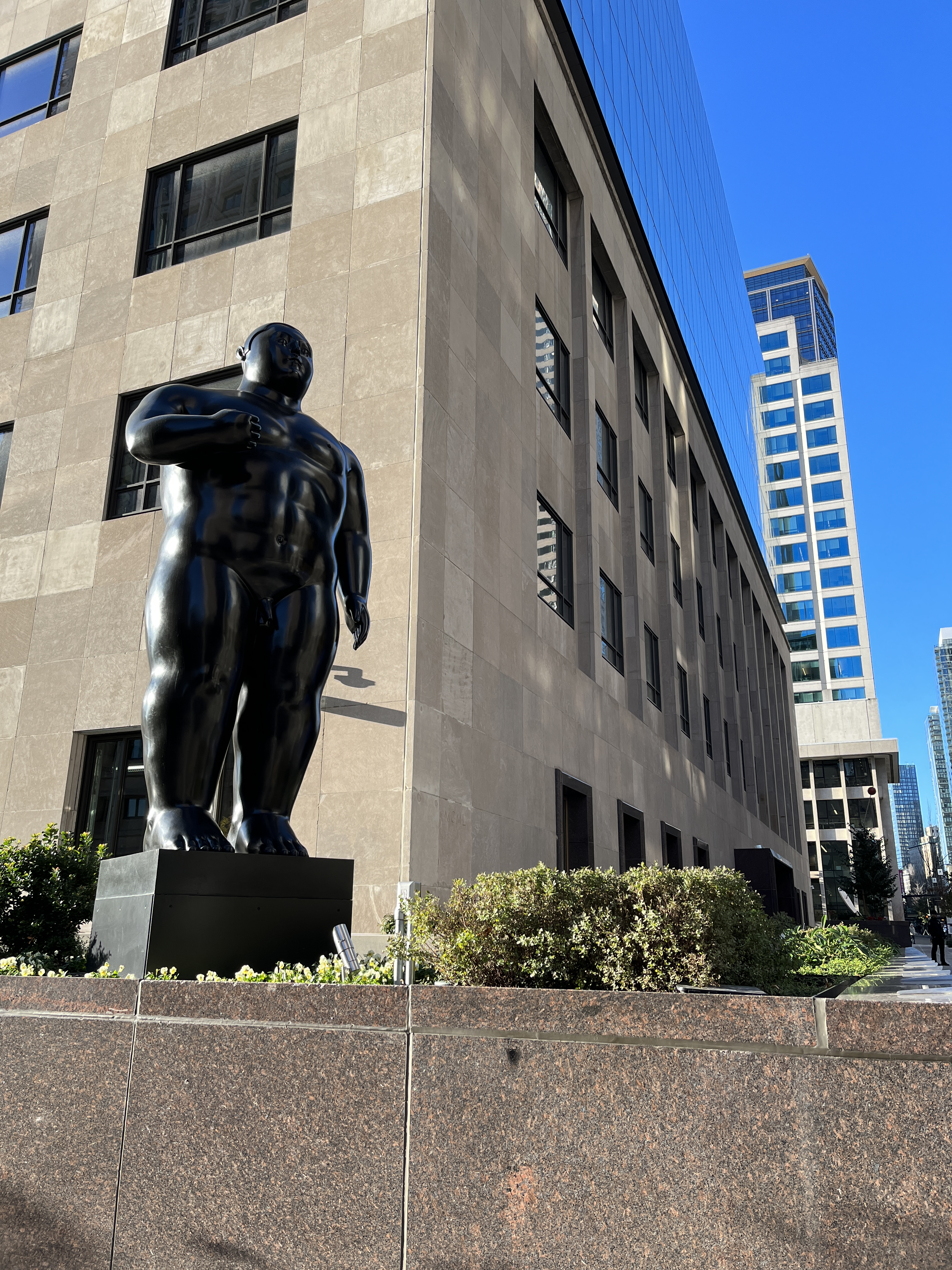
Adam, Seattle
