= Marta Traba =

Colombian Argentinean art critic of Galician parentage, academic (1930-83)

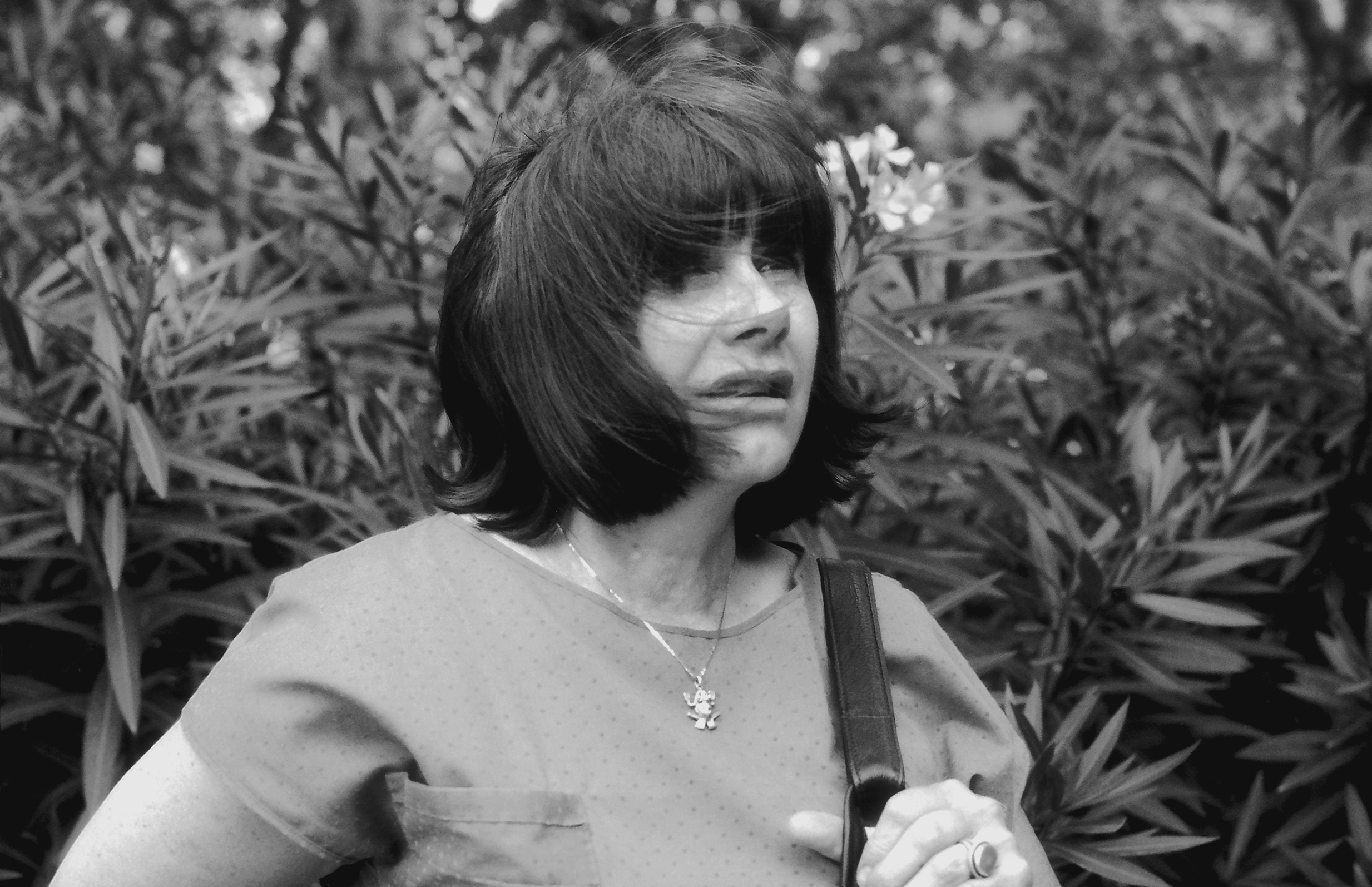
- Born: 25 January 1930; Buenos Aires, Argentina
- Died: 27 November 1983 (aged 53); Mejorada del Campo, Madrid, Spain
- Education: University of Buenos Aires; University of Paris
- Occupations: Art critic, writer
- Spouse(s): Alberto Zalamea; Ángel Rama
- Writing career
- Language: Spanish
- Period: 1954–1983
- Subjects: Latin American art, Modern art
- Notable works: El museo vacío, Arte de América Latina 1900–1980, Las ceremonias del verano

Marta Traba Taín (Buenos Aires, 25 January 1930 – Madrid, 27 November 1983) was an art critic and writer known for her contributions to Latin American art and literature.

== Biography ==
Traba's parents were Catalan immigrants, Francisco Traba and Marta Taín. She studied Letters at the University of Buenos Aires. Upon graduation she worked at the arts review journal Ver y Estimar ('Look and Consider'), under the editorship of the art critic Jorge Romero Brest.

From 1948 to 1950, Traba lived in Paris and took art history classes at La Sorbonne and the School of the Louvre. In Paris, she met her first husband, the Colombian journalist Alberto Zalamea, with whom she had two children, Gustavo and Fernando. In 1954, after a period in Italy and Argentina, the couple settled in Bogotá, Colombia. There, Traba taught art history at various universities, participated in television programs about art, and wrote art criticism for popular publications such as El Tiempo, Estampa, and Semana. She became a celebrity and one of the leading authorities in contemporary art in Colombia.

In the early 1960s, she co-founded and directed the Museum of Modern Art of Bogotá, which was later moved to the campus of the National University of Colombia. In 1967, during the government of President Carlos Lleras Restrepo, the military seized the campus of the National University of Colombia. After Traba publicly criticized these actions the government ordered her deportation, which was later rescinded on condition that Traba resign from all her official posts and refrain from political commentary. Traba left Colombia in 1969. With her second husband, the Uruguayan literary critic Ángel Rama she lived and worked in Montevideo, Caracas, and San Juan de Puerto Rico, often teaching at the local universities and publishing her often provocative art criticism.

In 1979, Traba and Rama settled in the Washington, D.C., area, as Rama was a tenured professor at the University of Maryland. Traba continued to lecture at various universities while preparing a catalog and a book based on the collection of the Art Museum of the Americas of the Organization of American States. In 1982, when the Ronald Reagan administration denied Traba and Rama permanent residency the couple moved to Paris. They were both killed along with Mexican novelist and playwright Jorge Ibargüengoitia and Peruvian novelist, poet, and political activist Manuel Scorza on 27 November 1983 when Avianca Flight 011 crashed near Madrid-Barajas airport. They were on the plane on their way to Colombia.

In February 2025, a crater on the planet Mercury was named in her honor.

== Publications ==
Traba published more than 20 books and around 1,000 articles about art. In 1958, she published El museo vacío, a book concerning modern art in which she adopted aesthetic notions by Benedetto Croce and Wilhelm Worringer. Traba also published numerous provocative essays about Latin American art: La pintura nueva en Latinoamérica (1961), Dos décadas vulnerables en las artes plásticas latinoamericanas (1950–1970) (1973), and Arte de América Latina 1900–1980. She also supported with her writings the work of numerous Colombian artists such as Alejandro Obregón, Fernando Botero, Leopoldo Richter (1896-1984), Guillermo Wiedemann, Eduardo Ramírez Villamizar, Samuel Montealegre, Edgar Negret, Feliza Bursztyn and Juan Antonio Roda.

In 1966, Traba began to publish novels. Her first novel Las ceremonias del verano (1966) received a prestigious award from the Casa de las Americas in Cuba. Amongst her other novels are Conversación al sur (1981) (English version: Mothers and Shadows, translated by Jo Labanyi) which details the struggles of two women during the Dirty War in Argentina.

== Sources ==
- Traba, Marta. Art of Latin America, 1900–1980. Washington, DC: Inter-American Development Bank; Baltimore, MD: Distributed by the Johns Hopkins University Press, 1994.
- Traba, Marta. Museum of Modern Art of Latin America: Selections from the Permanent Collection. Washington, DC: General Secretariat, Organization of American States, 1985.
- Verlichak, Victoria. Marta Traba. Una terquedad furibunda. Buenos Aires: Universidad de Tres de Febrero/Fundación Proa, 2002.
- Zalamea, Gustavo, ed. El programa cultural y político de Marta Traba: Relecturas. Bogotá: Universidad Nacional de Colombia, 2008.
