= Theater in Colombia =

Theater was introduced in Colombia during the Spanish colonization in 1550 through zarzuela companies. Colombian theater is supported by the Ministry of Culture and a number of private and state-owned organizations. Among the most important organizations are the National Association of Scenic Directors (ANDE), Performing Arts Workers Associations, Antioquia Storytellers Association, Colombian Association of Critique and Theater Research (ACIT), Puppeteers Associations (ATICO), and the Colombian Corporation of Theater, among others.

== History ==
=== Colombian Theater Pre-Independence ===
Indigenous Colombians were first introduced to theater during the reign of the Spanish. Colombia’s colonization, and thus subjugation, lasted from 1525 to 1819. Because of the timing, early performances were greatly influenced by Spanish Golden Age theater—a product of the Renaissance. Most plays at the time were religious dramas, as the Spanish state oversaw and regulated productions both at home and abroad.

One of Spain’s first colonies was located in modern-day Bogotá. To this day, the city is considered to be the theater capital of the country.

=== Theater of 19th Century and the Independence ===
After Colombia gained its independence in 1819, theater content shifted away from its religious roots and towards building a national identity. As theater attendance had become common across all social classes, the stage became an opportunity to reinforce themes of unity, conscience, and liberation.

Out of this era came memorable playwrights such as Luis Vargas Tejada, the “forerunner of Colombian theater.” The Santa Fé writer briefly served as Secretary of the Senate. He would later join a Bolivar oppositionist group. Throughout his time as a young revolutionary and political figure, Tejada wrote several plays and monologues across multiple genres. His most notable works are still performed today, including Las convuliones and Doraminta. The latter was written during Tejada’s final months, the majority of which was spent hiding in a cave.

José Fernández Madrid was another playwright whose works gained immense recognition in 19th century Colombia. Based out of Cartagena, Madrid wrote political plays critiquing Spain’s conquests of Central and South America.

These two playwrights, along with several others, helped to carve out a unique and solidified identity for Colombian theater. The growing fondness of the practice led to the construction of el Teatro de Cristóbal Colón in Bogotá. The theater was first opened in 1892. Its Italian style of architecture mimicked those in other newly liberated territories such as Argentina and Mexico. The fashion would inspire the designs of later Colombian playhouses.

=== 20th Century Colombian Theater ===
Colombian theater flourished in the 1900s, as budding playwrights and theater enthusiasts began to organize. One of the most popular authors of this period was Luis Enrique Osorio, later referred to as “The Father of Colombian Theater.” He wrote over 40 plays in his lifetime and created several theater troupes such as the Compañía Dramática Nacional and the Compañía Bogotána de Comedias.

As a connoisseur of comedy, Osorio would eventually construct a playhouse dedicated to the practice. El Teatro de la Comedia was built in 1952, a feat that would win Osorio the Jiménez de Quesada Prize in 1953.

But before the widespread erection of Colombian playhouses came the arrival of television and radio dramas in the ‘30s. This soon led to the introduction of mixed company productions in 1935. The expansion of both casts and outreach made Colombian theater more accessible to the public.

With this growth came the arrival of dramatic arts schools. The Bogotá and Cali Schools of Dramatic Art were founded in the mid-1950s. The schools brought scholars from across the globe to teach and host both performances and festivals. The social and cultural impact of fine arts education was so widespread that major schools like Universidad de Antioquia began offering degree programs for aspiring dramaturgs.

In the latter half of the 20th century, Colombian theater would gain even greater national acclaim. The development of the Colombian Theater Corporation in 1969 gave dramatic arts national priority. The group was in charge of coordinating major events such as festivals. Their work inspired several theatre troupes to start their own festivals. In 1988, actress Fanny Mikey and playwright Ramiro Osorio partnered up to create Colombia’s most notable festival to date: the Ibero-American Theater Festival of Bogota.

=== Contemporary Colombian Theater ===
Today, Colombian theater still embraces a culture of passion, freedom, and education. Many plays from Colombia’s earliest playwrights are still performed. Still, the room has been made on stage for young writers to touch on topics such as incarceration, identity, and immigration. This is possible, in large part, due to the now dozens of theatre organizations scattered from Colombia’s coasts to its jungles.

Despite the impacts of COVID-19, organizations such as ANDE Asociación Nacional de Dirección Escénica have continued the tradition of theater festivals by hosting them online.

=== Fun Facts ===
Theater in Colombia is informally known as "tablas" (woods) because of the wooden stages on which actors perform their plays.

== See also ==
- Om Ki Reo Escena
