= Lysippus (crater) =

Crater on Mercury

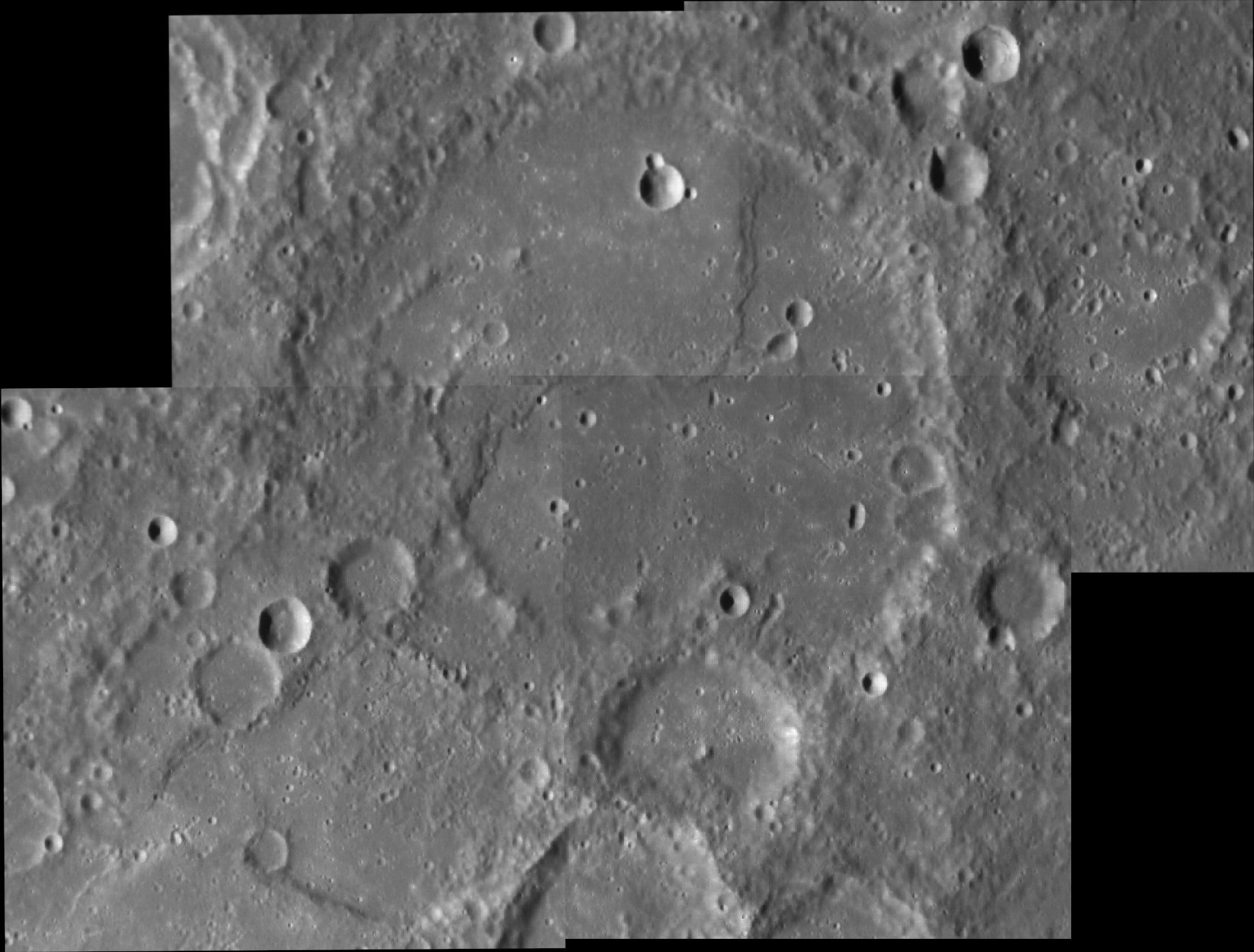
- MESSENGER NAC mosaic of Lysippus
- Feature type: Peak-ring impact basin
- Location: Beethoven quadrangle, Mercury
- Coordinates: 1.03°N 132.75°W
- Diameter: 155 km (96 mi)
- Eponym: Lysippos

Lysippus is a crater on Mercury. Its name was adopted by the International Astronomical Union in 1976. Lysippus is named for the Greek sculptor Lysippos, who lived in the 4th century BCE. The crater was first imaged by Mariner 10 in 1974.

Lysippus it is one of 110 peak ring basins on Mercury.

To the north of Lysippus is Thoreau crater, and to the east is Vieira da Silva crater.
