= Traba (crater) =

Crater on Mercury

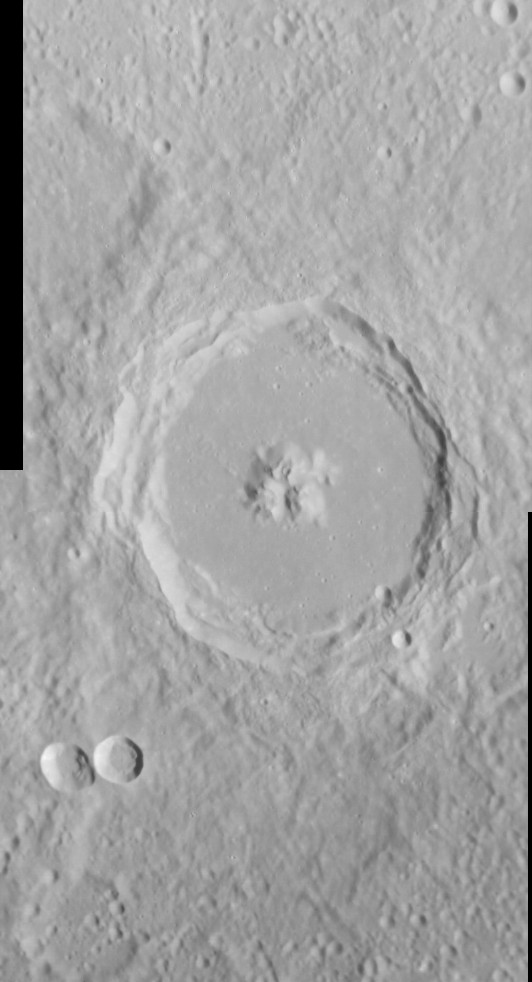
- MESSENGER NAC mosaic
- Planet: Mercury
- Coordinates: 5.56°N 117.53°W
- Quadrangle: Beethoven
- Diameter: 61.0 km (37.9 mi)
- Eponym: Marta Traba

Traba is a crater on Mercury. Its name was adopted by the International Astronomical Union (IAU) on February 7, 2025. The crater is named for Argentinian-Colombian writer and art critic Marta Traba. The crater was first imaged by Mariner 10 in 1974.

Traba is to the northeast of the large crater Vieira da Silva.
