= Vieira da Silva (crater) =

Crater on Mercury

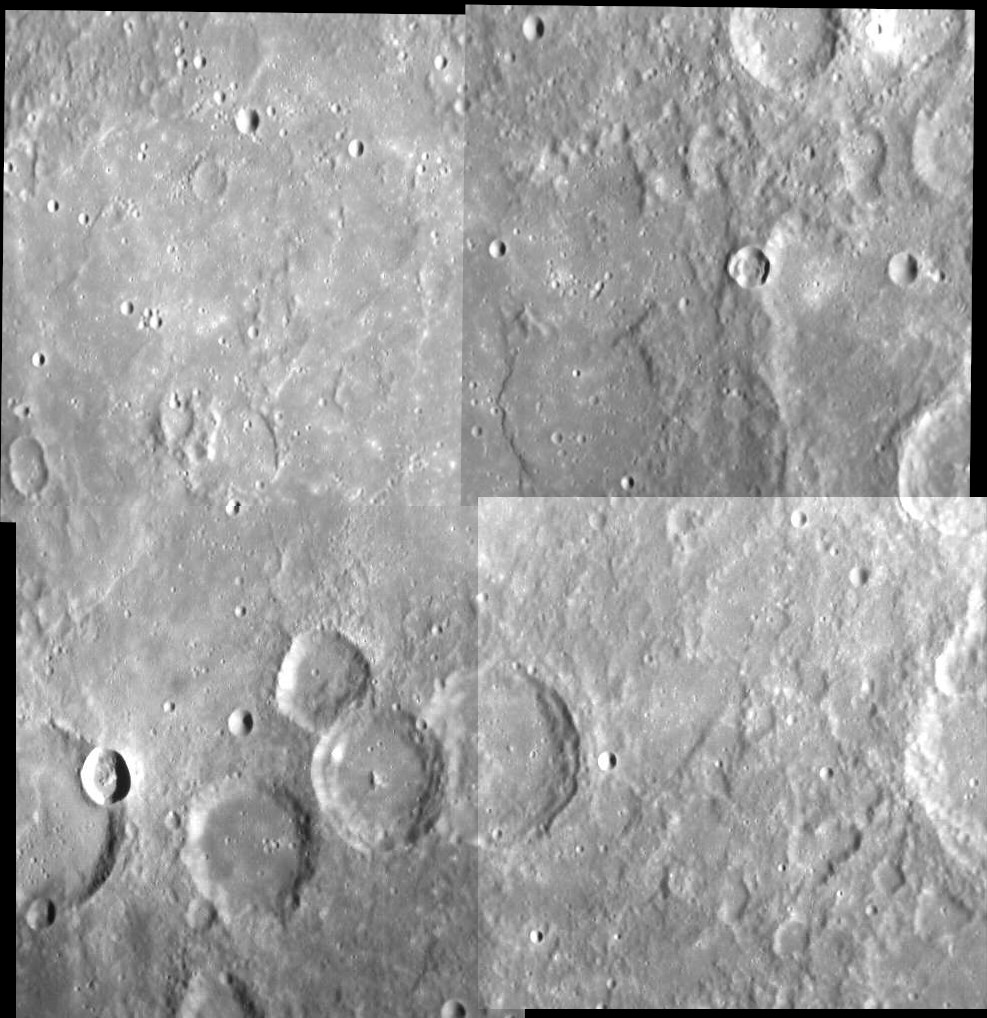
- MESSENGER NAC mosaic showing most of the crater
- Planet: Mercury
- Coordinates: 1.54°N 123.41°W
- Quadrangle: Beethoven
- Diameter: 274 km (170 mi)
- Eponym: Maria Helena Vieira da Silva

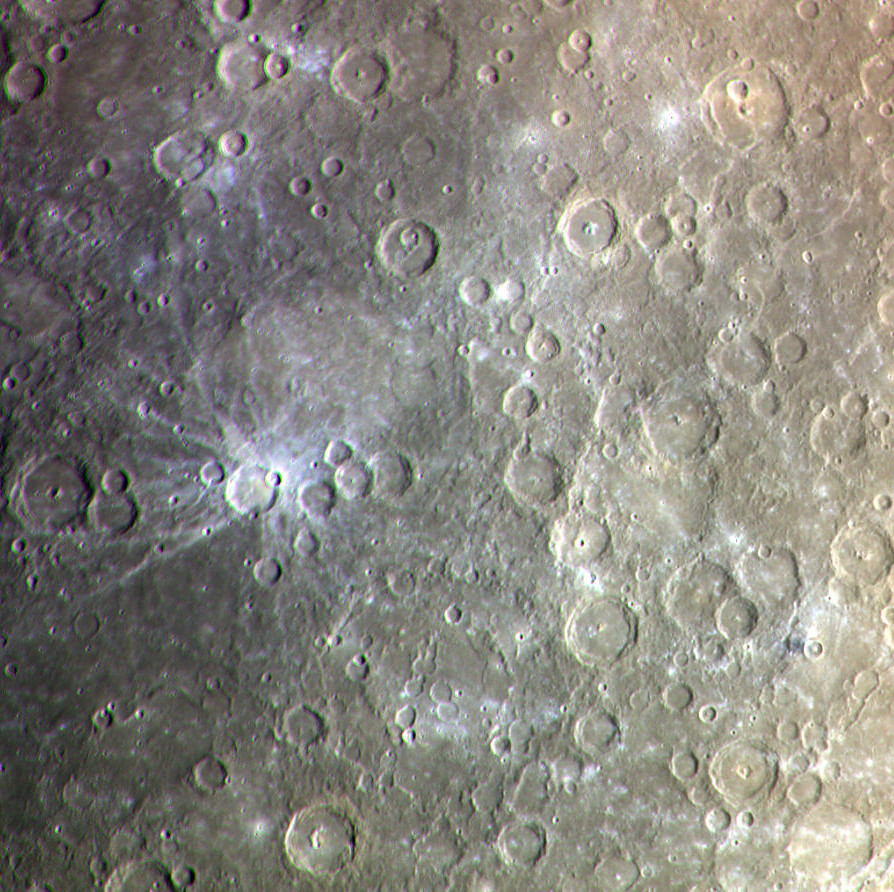
Vieira da Silva crater is the circular region to the left. The rays of Mena are prominent.

Vieira da Silva is a large crater on Mercury. Its name was adopted by the International Astronomical Union (IAU) in 2013. The crater is named for the Portuguese abstract painter Maria Helena Vieira da Silva. The crater was first imaged by Mariner 10 in 1974.

The small, rayed crater Mena lies within Vieira da Silva. To the west are Thoreau and Lysippus craters. To the northeast is Traba.
