= Feliza Bursztyn =

Colombian sculptor (1933–1982)

- Born: 8 September 1933; Bogotá, Colombia
- Died: 8 January 1982 (aged 48); Paris, France
- Education: Art Students League of New York; Académie de la Grande Chaumière
- Known for: Sculpture
- Notable work: Camas e Histéricas

Feliza Bursztyn (8 September 1933 – 8 January 1982) was a Colombian sculptor.

== Biography ==
Feliza Bursztyn was born in Bogotá, Colombia, in 1933 to Polish-Jewish immigrants. Her parents were visiting Bogotá at the time of her birth in 1933. When they received news of Adolf Hitler's election to the German Chancellorship, they decided to remain in Colombia, where her father founded a small textile factory.

Bursztyn's father managed a prosperous textile factory and the family rose to the elite ranks of industrialists in a nation that underwent a swift process of modernisation. Her father's textile factory allowed her to pursue studies in Bogotá, then at the Art Students League of New York to study painting, and lastly the Académie de la Grande Chaumière in Paris to study sculptures. At the Academia Grande Chaumière, she was taught by the cubist sculptor Ossip Zadkine. On her second trip to Europe she learned to melt and work scrap metal with the sculptor César Baldaccini.

Bursztyn wasn't as enthusiastic, however, about the country's dynamic transformation because of her observation that the process further deepened the nation's social and economic divisions. In 1960 she converted a section of her father's factory into an art studio. She explored the use of materials and was influenced by the work of the French artist César Baldaccini, and after 1961 she started using scrap metal within her works. Bursztyn was part of a generation that changed the definition of sculpture in Colombian culture.

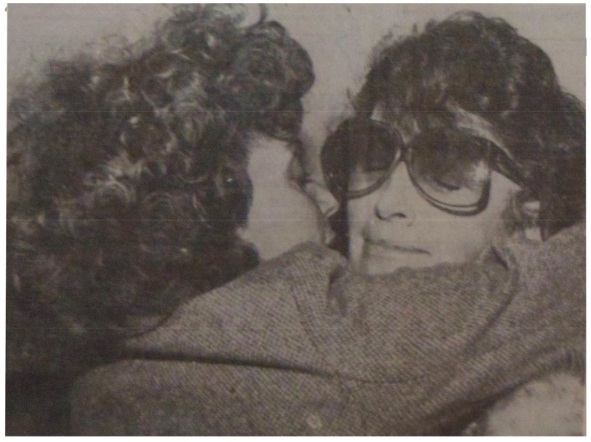
Fanny Mikey seeing off Feliza Bursztyn at El Dorado Airport as she left the country to go into exile in Mexico. August 8, 1981.

Bursztyn's workshop in Bogotá was a gathering place for many writers, artists, and intellectuals including Gabriel García Márquez, Alejandro Obregón, Marta Traba, Álvaro Cepeda Samudio, Santiago García, Jorge Gaitán Durán, Fernando Martínez Sanabria, and Hernando Valencia Goelkel. She took exile in Mexico in 1981 due to the political and social problems in Colombia.

Bursztyn married Lawrence Fleischer on 6 December 1952 and together had three daughters, Jannette, Bethina, and Michelle. On 6 December 1982 Michelle gave birth to a daughter and named her Feliza. Bursztyn died in exile in Paris on 8 January 1982, leaving many of her works to the Colombian Ministry of Culture and the National Museum of Colombia.

=== Life as an artist ===
Bursztyn was a Colombian artist who evolved her own original path of kinetic art. Her later sculptures took a more direct approach to the critique of political and religious elites. Bursztyn never shied from her support of leftist opposition movements. After a trip to Cuba, she found Colombia's political police in her flat, who accused her of smuggling weapons to the partisans through her studio. Bursztyn gained political asylum in Mexico, then later immigrated to Paris. She died from a heart attack a short time later.

Bursztyn was a pioneer in the concept of installation art, referring to her pieces as "espacios ambientales" (environmental spaces) due to their direct relationship to the spaces in which they were exhibited. Bursztyn has been one of the artists who have most marked the contemporary art of Colombia and Latin America, but she is little recognized by history. Perhaps, many prefer to ignore her because she devoted herself, both in her artistic career and in her personal life, to breaking the rules.

Bursztyn entered the canon of Colombian art history as a key modern artist, but to place emphasis primarily on her formal innovations as they contributed to the development of modern, autonomous art in Colombia is to risk minimizing the ways in which her work challenged cultural hegemony and European-American discourses of modernity. Her art can be interpreted as problematizing the assumption that "development" is the answer to "underdevelopment," that modernity can be universally beneficial. In their confrontations with dominant power structures in Colombia that sought to control class and gender relations and morality, Bursztyn's work exposed modernity's dark side, coloniality.

== Timeline ==
=== 1960s ===
- In 1961, Bursztyn presented her first of eleven chatarras (sculptures made from scraps) in which received negative backlash and a harsh review from even Colombia's leading art critic, Walter Engel.
- 1962: Exhibits at the Besalel Museum in Jerusalem and participates in the XIV Colombian Artists Salon.
- 1963: Participates in the XV Salon of Colombian Artists in the National Museum of Bogotá.
- 1964: Win the First Prize in Sculpture at the I Intercol Salon, at the Museum of Modern Art in Bogotá.
- By 1964, and around the time of her second solo art show, art critics, much like Walter Engel, decided to reconsider the possibilities of "junk" as "art."
- In 1965, Bursztyn won first prize in sculpture at the 17th Salón Nacional, and in 1967 she unveiled a new body of work, made of stainless steel with a kinetic component, which she titled Las histéricas (The hysterical ones).
- 1965: Win the First Prize in sculpture at the XVII Colombian Artists Salon with the sculpture "Mirando al Norte".
- 1966: Part of Six Colombian Sculptors exhibition of the Luis Angel Arango Library and participates in the XVIII National Artists Hall in the same institution.
- 1967: Win the Third Prize at the XIX Salon of National Artists, at the Luis Ángel Arango Library, Bogotá. That same year authorities detained Bursztyn at El Dorado airport by military authorities during her arrival on a trip to Europe, Cuba and Israel.
- 1968: Exhibits "Las Histéricas" at the Museum of Modern Art in Bogotá. The exhibit consisted of 27 stainless steel scrap metal sculptures places in corners, on the ceiling, and on the walls of the exhibition hall. Each sculpture featured the motor of a record player, causing the pieces to move and rub against each other, and were accompanied by sound and light projections. The same series is also presented in Buenos Aires, San Francisco and Havana.

=== 1970s ===
- In the 1970s, two important works—the series Las camas (The beds, 1974) and La baila mecánica (The mechanical dance, 1979) -- fully embraces the possibilities of kinetic art in a multimedia setting. In 1974, at the Museo de Arte Moderno de Bogotá, Las camas consisted of thirteen motorized beds with stranges shapes moving suggestively underneath satin sheets to a sound track composed by experimental musician Jacqueline Nava. Similarly, for la baila mechanica, Bursztyn built seven large upright covered sculptures resembling bodies. As with the beds, the figures would "dance" to music with dramatic lighting to complete the stagelike presentation.
- 1971: Makes the sculpture "Tribute to Gandhi" which is located in Carrera 7 with 100th Street in Bogotá and participates in Ten Years of Colombian Art and in the XXII National Artists Hall in the National Museum.
- 1972: Participates in the III Biennial of Coltejer in Medellín and in the 1st National Exhibition of Plastic Arts of the Jorge Tadeo Lozano University. There she obtains the Special Prize Paz del Río for "Cama".
- 1973: Designs the offices of Par Publicidad in Medellín commissioned by Luis de Zuleta and Amílcar Osorio.
- 1974: Presents "Camas" with mechanical movement in the Museum of Modern Art of Bogotá and the Museum of Modern Art La Tertulia.
- 1975: Executes one of her "Lacework" as a mural on the façade of the Banco del Comercio in Bogotá and exhibits "Beds with music and movement" in the Museum of the University City of Mexico.
- 1976: The "Last Supper" mural is finished, made with 12 thousand silverware, for the Hotel Center of the Seine, Bogotá.
- 1977: Exhibits her "Miniesculturas" at the San Diego Gallery in Bogotá.
- 1979: Exhibits the exhibition "Baila Mecánica" at the Garcés Velásquez Gallery, the La Tertulia Museum of Modern Art, Warsaw, Kraków and Havana.

=== 1980s ===
- 1980: Participates in an exhibition of Colombian Artists in Casa de las Américas, in Havana.
- In 1981, Detained and questioned for two days by the military after her two trips to Cuba.
- In 1982, Died of a heart attack at the age of forty-eight in Paris, on 8 January.

== Artworks ==
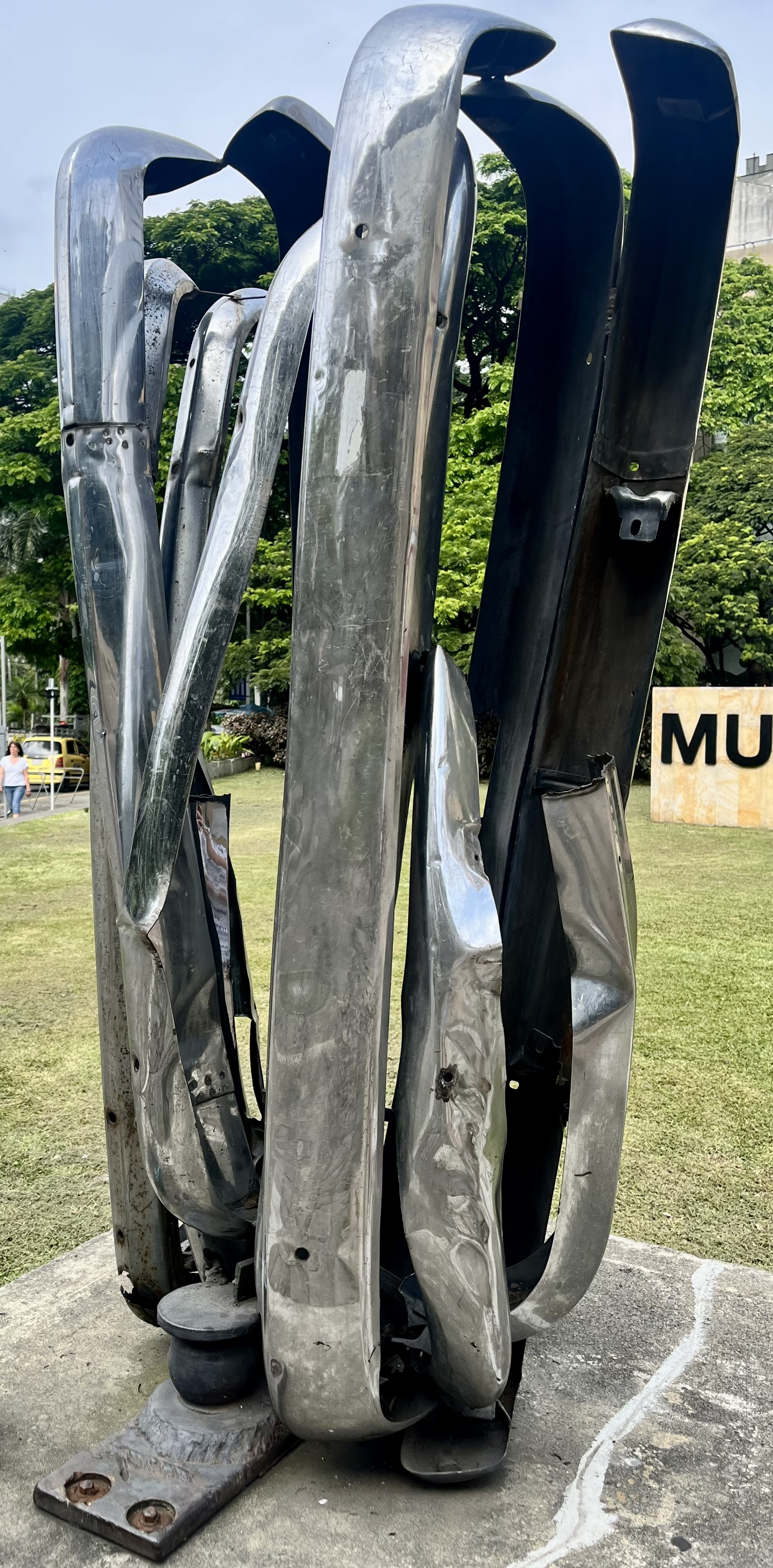
Flor (1975) at La Tertulia Museum sculpture garden.

Although her artwork is abstract, through its material of "the new reality" and its new relationship to viewers, it can be linked to social issues. From her comfortable yet "outsider" position as a Jewish woman, daughter of immigrant industrialists, living next to a factory, she was able to flourish as an innovative artist with radical views.

Unlike other Latin American artists working in abstract art, Bursztyn's pursuit was never focused on rules on how reality should be experienced. On the contrary, she used it as a medium for politicized content relating to women's rights in a post-colonial society, revealing the troublesome face of modernization while putting forth a critique of authoritarian rule. There is a special place for Bursztyn among the company of artists working in the field of kinetic art. For her, the movement was never a source of fascination. Rather, it was a way of conjuring up a feeling of discomfort in the viewer. The kinetic art created by Bursztyn wasn't so much a research tool as a method of depicting that which wasn't supposed to be spoken of. Eventually, she evolved her own original path of kinetic art.

=== Chatarras ===
In 1961, Bursztyn unveiled her first eleven chatarras, relatively simple and flat compositions of rustic mechanical fragments such as wheels hoops, nuts, bolts, spark plugs, gears, wires, etc.

Bursztyn's first sculptures (Chatarras – assemblages) were made of junkyard scraps – discarded fragments of machines, tires, cables, bolts and other metal bits. Hers was an undaunted critique of industrialism and ensuing rise of consumerism, and it wasn't welcomed with open arms by the nation's art institutions and critics, who generally believed that artists should be supportive of Colombia's progress.

=== Las histéricas ===
Las histericas was Bursztyn's break with common preconceptions and social naturalizations. She used materials, forms, movements and mechanical noises, she created art that was rough and shocking. She put the junkyard scraps away in favor of discarded parts from a radiator manufacturing plant. She attached a small electrical motor to the long, spiraling strips of aluminum, which came together as abstract forms set into a noisy, vibrating motion that were experienced by the viewer through several senses at once. Bursztyn expressed interest in using the exhibition space as an experiential space. Her sculptures took up all the walls and floors, some of them hung from the ceiling in entirely blacked-out rooms, with a single spotlight directed at a particular work constantly in motion.

The hysterics, made of scrap stainless steel, were exhibited in 1968 at the Museum of Modern Art in Bogotá, which in those years was based at the National University. With that work, she won that year's XIX National Salon of Artists. In 1969, the series paired with the film Hoy Felisa by experimental director Luis Ernesto Arocha, which, in turn, featured the mobile forms of Las histéricas woven through with the images of pop culture idols like Bette Davis and Marlon Brando.

=== Las camas ===
In Las camas, 1974, she took 13 beds and in each of them she placed an enigmatic form covered in multi-coloured fabrics, along with an electric motor that set the entire piece in a vibrating motion. In the Mechanical Dance, several characters coexisted completing themselves, providing depth and even from different points of view. However, a degree of sadness and bad omen prevailed in space. If we take into account the events that led to Bursztyn's exile, each character under the Baila fabrics was a hint of what would happen during those years with many Colombians blindfolded and interrogated, subjected to an absurd and endless mechanism. From this perspective, the exhibition space was social and political: the victims were on a platform to be observed by the public with attention and indifference.

=== La baila mechanica ===
In her Mechanical Ballet, 1979, Bursztyn used linen, steel, motors and wheels to create a stage and arranged seven abstract figures upon it, which hung from the ceiling and performed an awkward, uncoordinated mechanical dance.

== Exhibitions ==
=== Selected solo exhibitions ===
- 1958 Galería el Callejón, Bogotá
- 1964 Museo de Arte Moderno de Bogotá
- 1974 Las camas, La Tertulia Museum, Cali, Colombia
- 1979 La baila mecánica, Galería Garcés Velásquez, Bogotá
- 2009 Feliza Bursztyn: Elogio de la chatarra, presented as a part of the series Homenajes Nacional by the Museo Nacional de Colombia, Bogotá. Bursztyns included works were characterized by the use of industrial waste as the main sculptural material, with a presentation centered around concepts of poetry, movement, and space.
- 2015 Leon Tovar Gallery at ARCOmadrid 2015 Leon Tovar Gallery.
- 2016 Galería la Cometa at ARTBO 2016 Galería La Cometa
- 2017 Leon Tovar Gallery at ARCOmadrid 2017 Leon Tovar Gallery.
- 2018 Leon Tovar Gallery at ARTBO 2018 Leon Tovar Gallery.
- 2019 Leon Tovar Gallery at ARCOmadrid 2019 Leon Tovar Gallery.

=== Past exhibitions ===
- 2015 Folding: Line, Space & Body/ Latin American Women Artists Working Around Abstraction, Henrique Faria, New York
- 2016 2016 - Pensamiento escultórico, Galeria Casas Reigner
- 2017 Radical Women in Latin American Art, 1960–1985, Hammer Museum
- 2017 Edges and Angles, Leon Tovar Gallery, New York.
- 2018 The Other Trans-Atlantic. Kinetic and Op Art in Eastern Europe and Latin, Garage Museum of Contemporary Art
- 2018 Radical Women Latin American Art, 1960–1985, Brooklyn Museum of Art

== Collections ==
Feliza Bursztyn's art work has been collected privately and also by public institutions, such as the Museo de arte Moderno, Museo Nacional de Colombia, and Banco de la Republica, all in Bogotá, and Tate Modern London.

== Honors and awards ==
- 1965: First prize for Sculptures, XVII National Salon.
- 1965: Win the First Prize in sculpture at the XVII Colombian Artists Salon with the sculpture "Mirando al Norte"
- 1967: Third prize at the XIX Salon of National Artists.
