= Thoreau (crater) =

Crater on Mercury

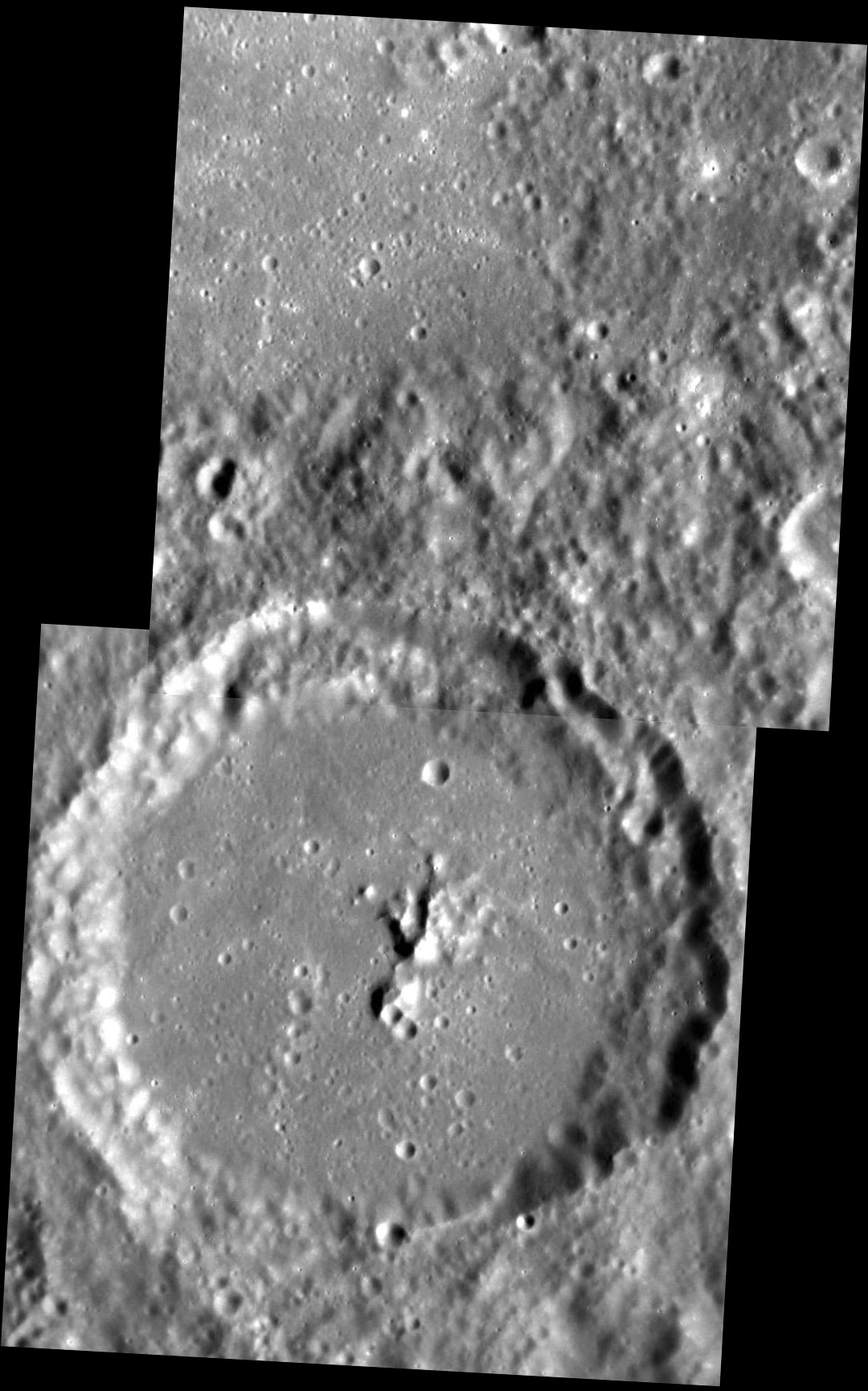
- MESSENGER NAC mosaic
- Planet: Mercury
- Coordinates: 5.94°N 132.64°W
- Quadrangle: Beethoven
- Diameter: 72.0 km (44.7 mi)
- Eponym: Henry David Thoreau

Thoreau is a crater on Mercury. Its name was adopted by the International Astronomical Union (IAU) in 1985, after American poet and philosopher Henry David Thoreau. The crater was first imaged by Mariner 10 in 1974.

To the south of Thoreau is Lysippus crater, and to the southeast is Vieira da Silva crater.
