= Mena (Mercurian crater) =

Crater on Mercury

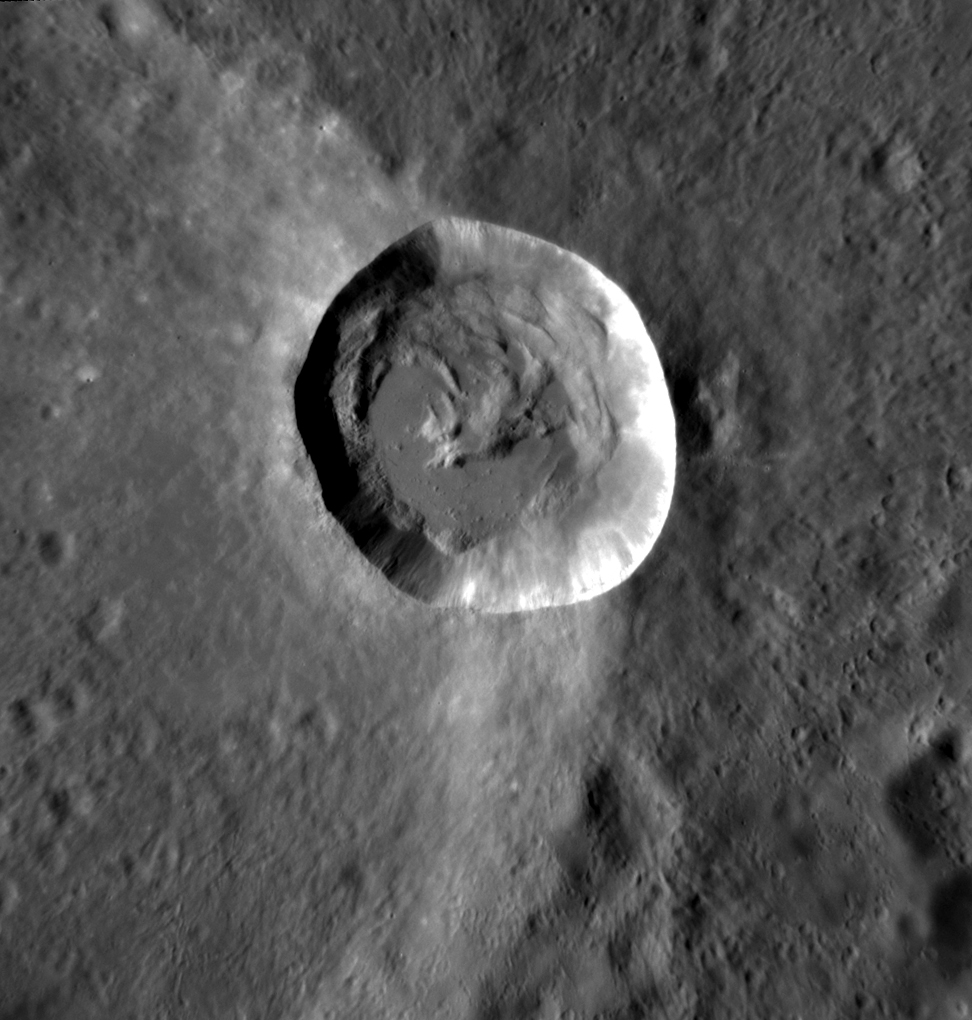
- MESSENGER image of Mena
- Feature type: Central-peak impact crater
- Location: Beethoven quadrangle, Mercury
- Coordinates: 0.17°S 124.73°W
- Diameter: 15 km (9.3 mi)
- Discoverer: Mariner 10
- Eponym: Juan de Mena

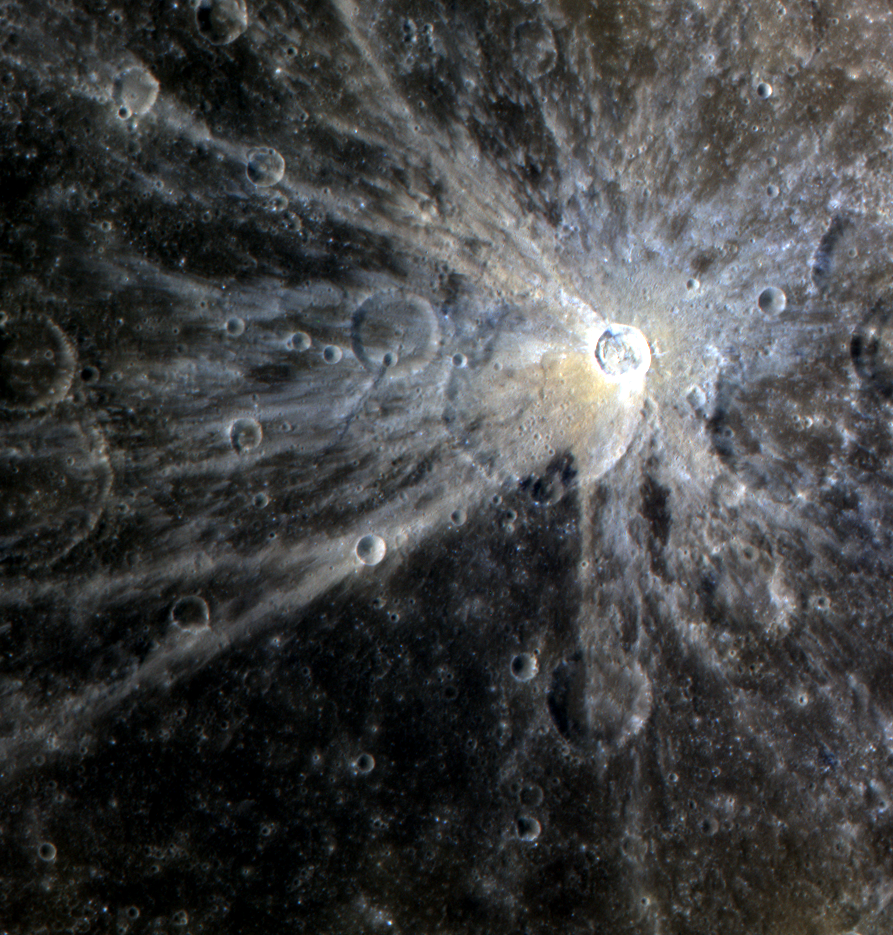
Approximate color image showing Mena's ray system

Mena is a crater in the Beethoven quadrangle on Mercury. Its name was adopted by the International Astronomical Union in 1976. Mena is named for the Spanish poet Juan de Mena, who lived from 1411 to 1456.

Mena lies on the eastern rim of a larger unnamed crater, which is in turn within the much larger crater Vieira da Silva.

== Crater type and features ==
Situated on the rim of an older, larger crater, Mena does not take on the typical bowl shape created by smaller impacts. Instead, Mena is classified as a complex crater with a peak located inside the bowl-shaped cavity. This peak is caused by a propagating shock wave that rebounds and converges at the crater's center, causing the target material to be uplifted. Typically, the presence of a central peak is determined by the transition diameter of the celestial body; a crater diameter less than the transition diameter results in a simple crater, whereas one that is larger creates a complex crater. Transition diameter sizes depend on the mass of the impacted body; the approximate transition diameter on Mercury is 8 km, smaller than Mena's diameter, so we would expect it to be a complex crater.

In many cases, the central peak of a complex crater is located almost exactly in the center of the crater itself and is relatively symmetric. However, the peak inside of Mena does not possess these characteristics. Instead, Mena's peak takes on an irregular shape, with the northeastern region containing some uplifted material, while the southwestern region contains little-to-none. Though this asymmetrical property of the crater's central peak could be due to a number of factors (such as the angle of impact, composition of the target material, or speed of the impact), the most likely reason for Mena's irregular peak is that the crater lies on the rim of a much larger, pre-existing crater. Before the impact that created Mena, the target material was not evenly distributed. Thus, when the impactor struck, shock waves were not able to evenly propagate through the target material. This, in turn, led to the regions of varying uplifted material inside the crater.
