= Om Ki Reo Escena =

Om Ki Reo Escena (formerly known as "Om Ki Reo Teatro" and "Om Ki Reo Danza Contemporánea") is a Colombian theatrical/cinematographic collective in Bogotá, D.C. founded in 2009 and directed by Manuel J. Escobar (Manuel Hai).

Its first production was the stageplay "El Funeral" (2010, The Funeral); and their first short films (as a group) were 2020 short films from the "Mis Aguinaldos" series ("My Christmas gifts"). In 2016, the company participated in the Bogotá PDE with "El Marqués de Upyr" and in 2018 the group produced "Hechizo en el Mar" ("Enchantment in the sea") and "Canción Incompleta" ("Incomplete song"), this last one performed by the subgroup Flipped Hat Teatro, and repeated in 2019. In 2020, Om Ki Reo Escena (Om Ki Reo Scene) won a Multidisciplinary Grant given by the District Government (Secretaría de Cultura, Recreación y Deporte de Bogotá SCRD), inside the District Program of Incentives to the Culture, getting the first place. With this grant, the group produced short films, scenic interventions and visual creations. Also in 2020, the company produced the short film "Conjetura" ("Conjecture"), Official Selection in the SmartFilms Festival 2020 and winner of Best SciFi Short Film in the 2023 Couch Film Festival in Ontario, Canada.

In 2021, the group founded the film production company SevenPhotons Films and launched several projects under the format of Transmedia Theater; one of them is the adaptation of "Soy El Hombre", written by the founder and one of the best sci-fi short stories written in Colombia, according to the anthology published by Sergio Arboleda University. Om Ki Reo Escena won the National Grant on "Theatrical Creation" (given by the Ministry of Culture of Colombia) for big format projects in 2021 to produce the first approach to this piece, which is a simplified version of the second phase projection. Inside the theater and cinematographic media (specially in Latin America and Colombia), and according to the state of the art commented by experts on the area, the grouping of theater, dance, literature, technology and film under a science fiction theme constitutes a multidisciplinary innovation, as no other multidisciplinary SF transmedia theatre stage play is found in literature. The project was written, developed and executed by the leader of the group, Manuel J. Escobar, who is the director, producer and writer of all the productions of Om Ki Reo Escena, now focused in transhumanism. Soy El hombre was presented in Teatro Libre de Bogotá in February of 2022, and event that was part of the national news.

== See also ==
- Theater of Colombia
