= Bogotá Museum of Modern Art =

Museum in Colombia

Coordinates: 4°36′37″N 74°04′10″W

- Museo de Arte Moderno de Bogotá (MAMBO)
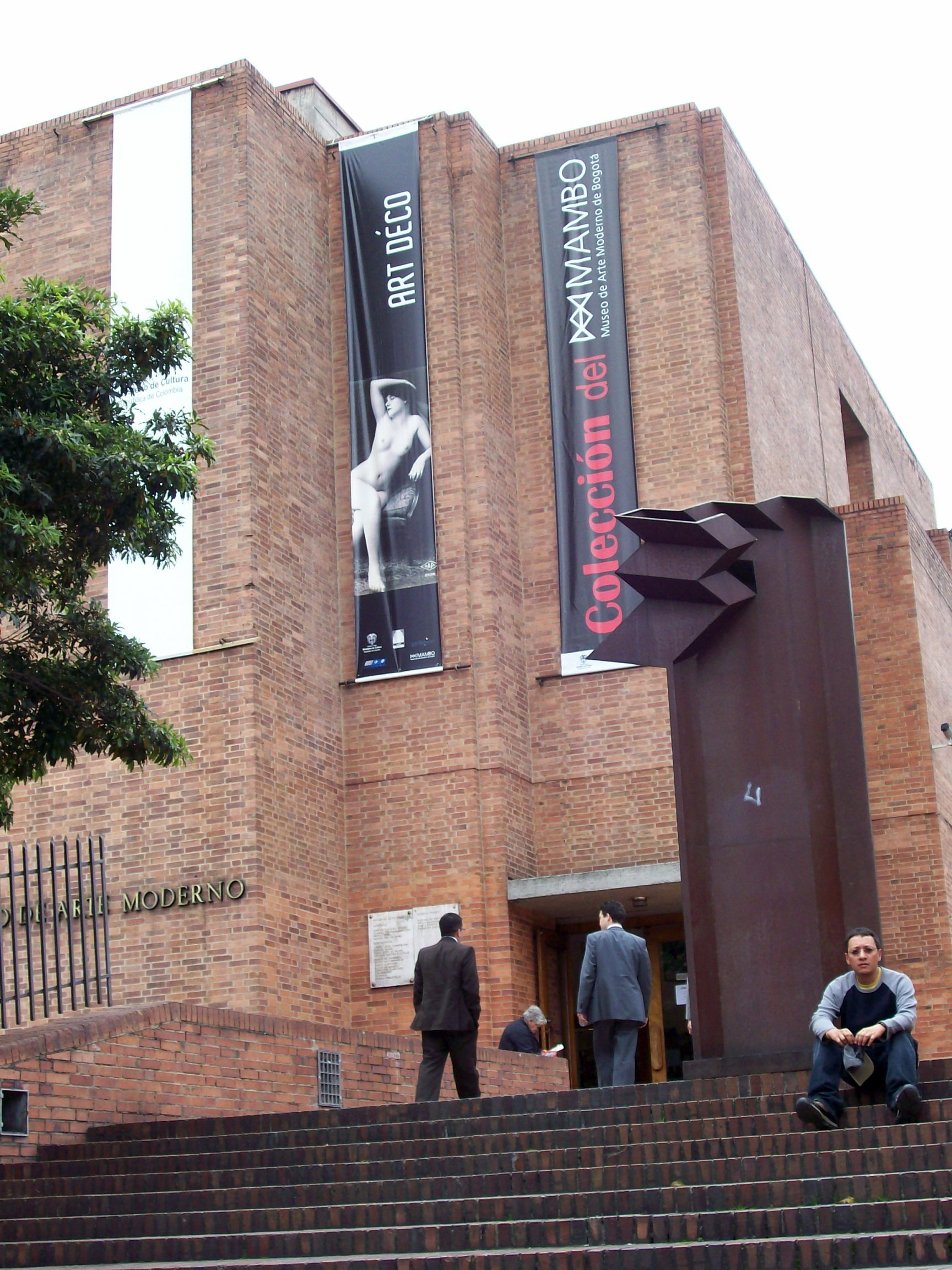
- The exterior of the Bogotá Museum of Modern Art (2006)

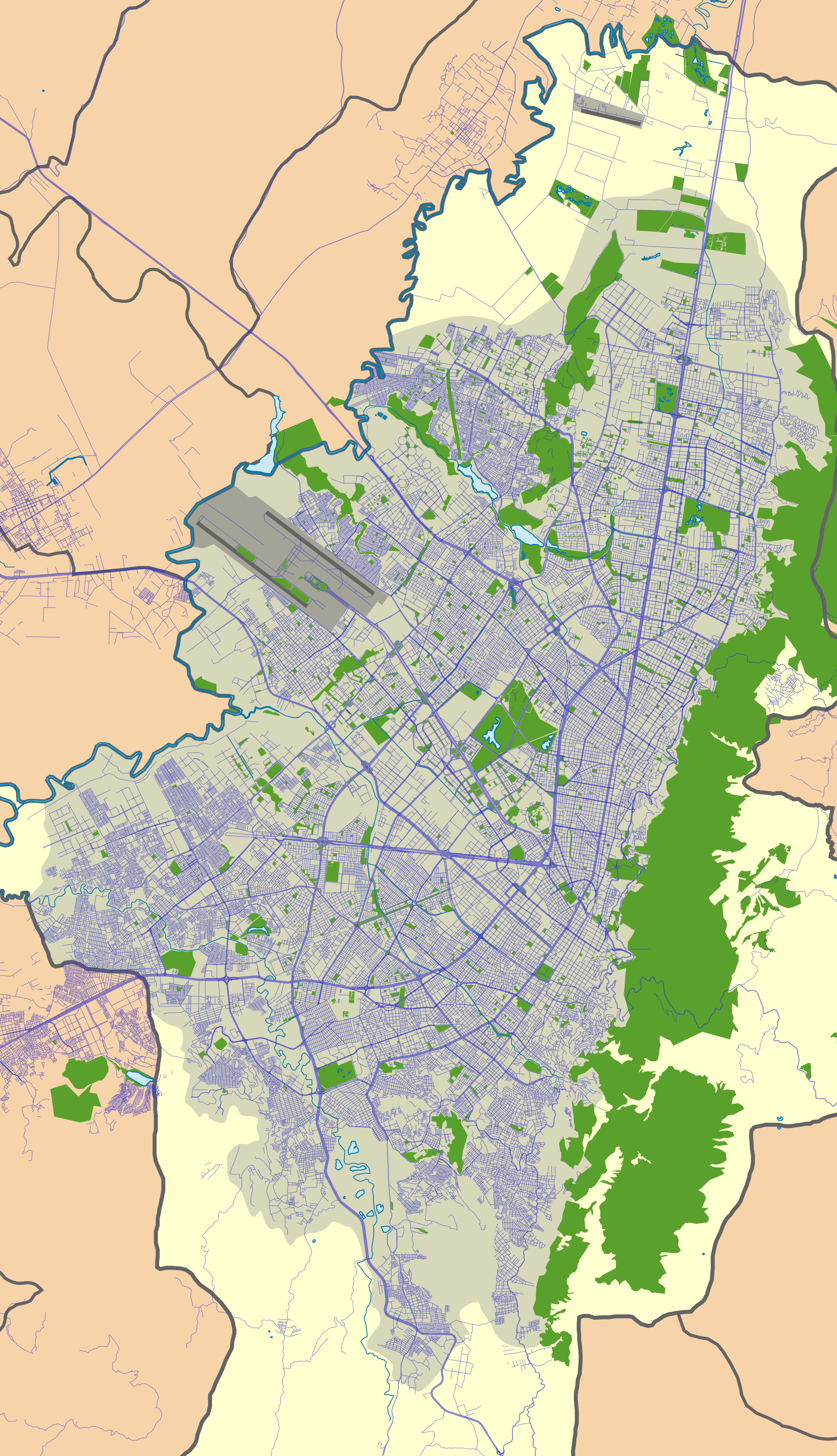
- Location within Bogotá
- Established: 27 July 1955
- Location: Bogotá, Cundinamarca, Colombia
- Type: Modern Art Museum
- Director: Gloria Zea (1969-2016)
- Architect: Rogelio Salmona
- Website: www.mambogota.com

The Bogotá Museum of Modern Art (Museo de Arte Moderno de Bogotá, known as MAMBO) is a museum of modern art located in Bogotá, Colombia. It is one of the main cultural and artistic establishments in Colombia.

== History ==
The museum opened to the public in 1963 by the art critic Marta Traba. From 1969 to 2016, its director was Gloria Zea, the ex-wife of sculptor Fernando Botero.

From right to left: Olga Duque de Ospina, Gloria Zea, Fanny Mikey, and Ana Martha de Pizarro

== Headquarters ==
The museum's current headquarters was designed by Rogelio Salmona in 1985 and has been located in the center of Bogotá ever since. Featuring 5,000 square meters of floorspace distributed over four levels, it contains a sculpture patio, a library, an auditorium, a photo library, a warehouse, a movie theater and a restaurant.

Rogelio Salmona's building is composed of four floors joined by a central staircase, forming a labyrinth of stones and stairs. The building was specially designed to house art collections, both for display and for storage and conservation. The building is characterized by its Salmona style, featuring exposed brick, ramps and passageways, as well as unconventional entrances and exits to each of the rooms. A notable characteristic of the building is the contrast between natural lighting and artificial lighting achieved through large windows and skylights overhead the exhibition rooms.

== Gallery ==
Pictures of the Bogotá Muesum of Modern Art
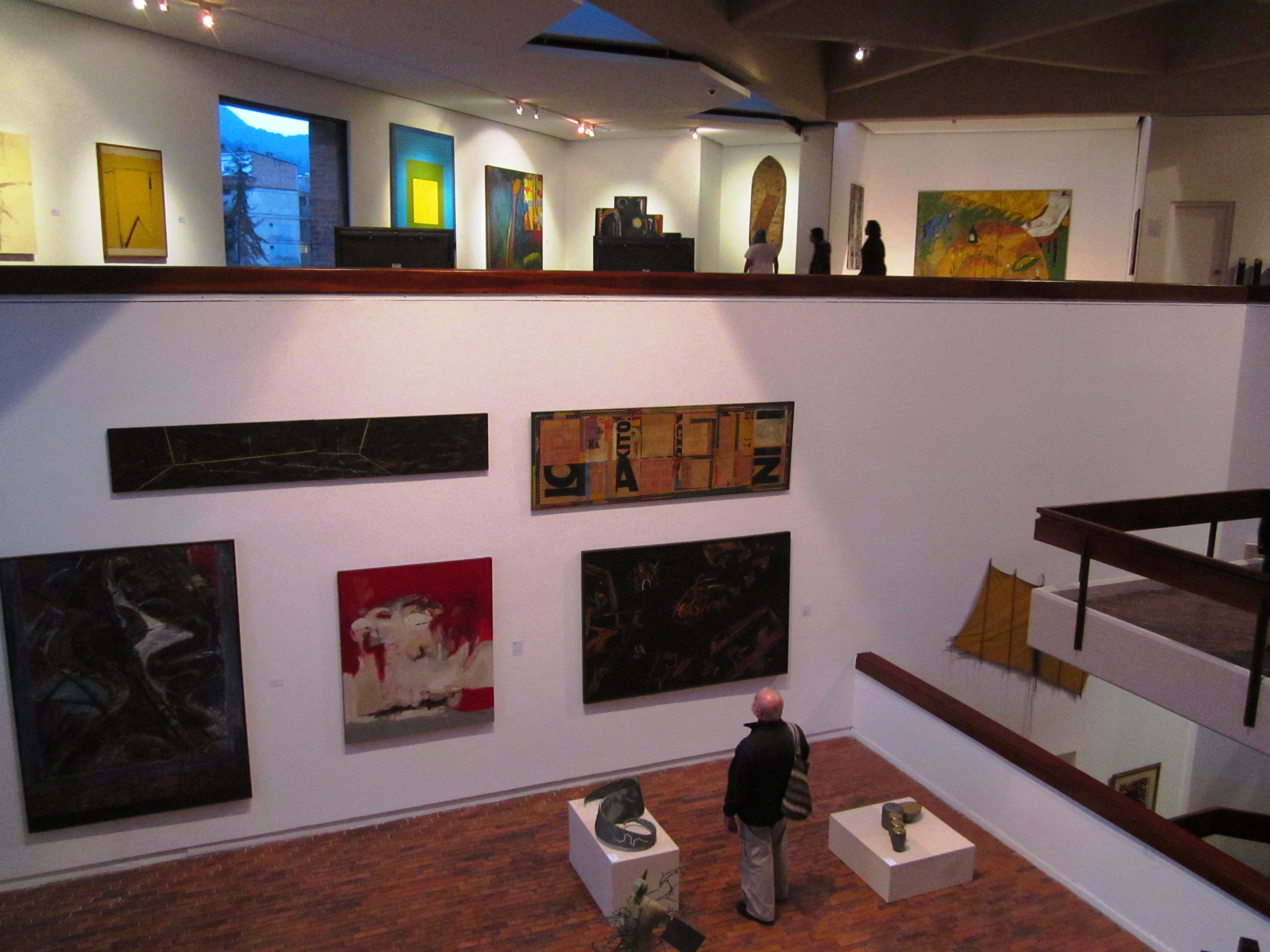

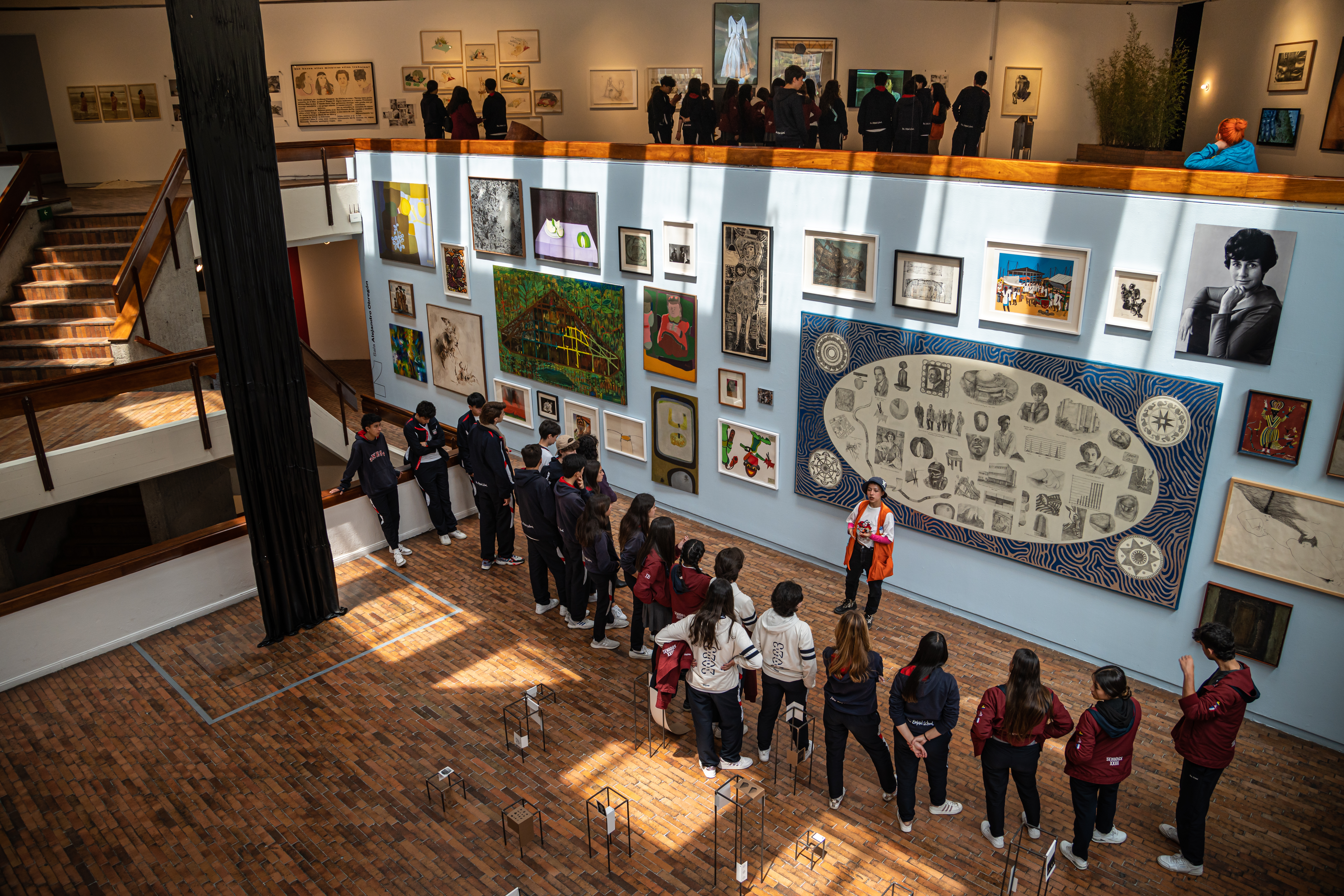

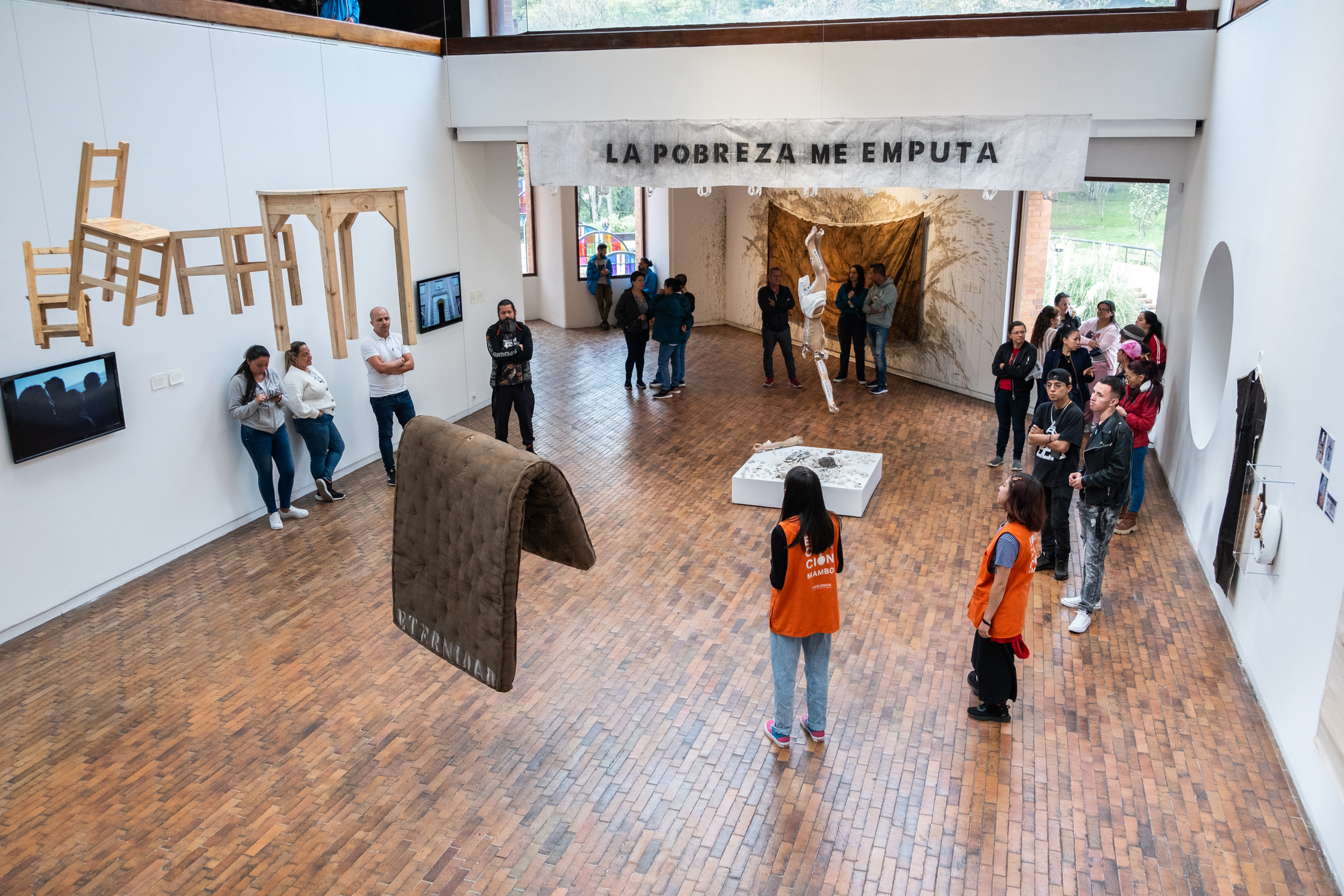

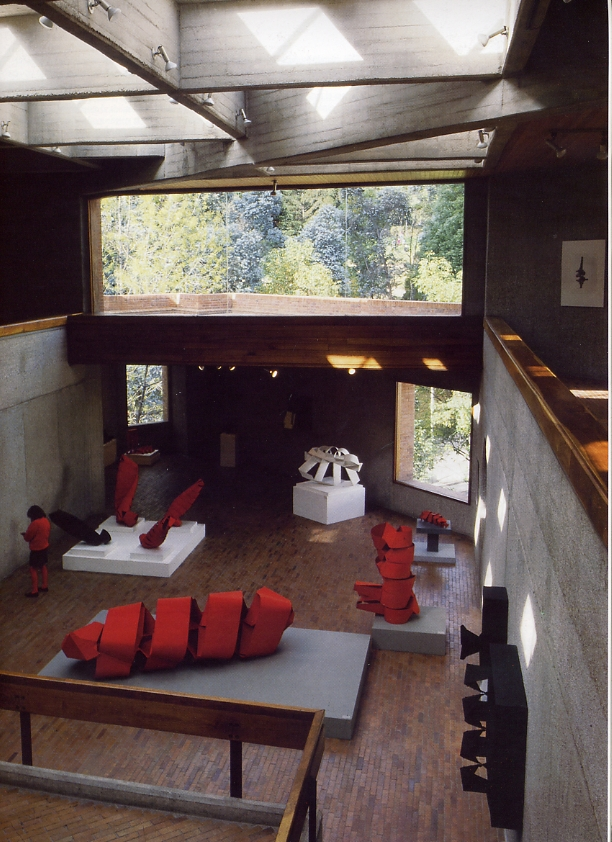

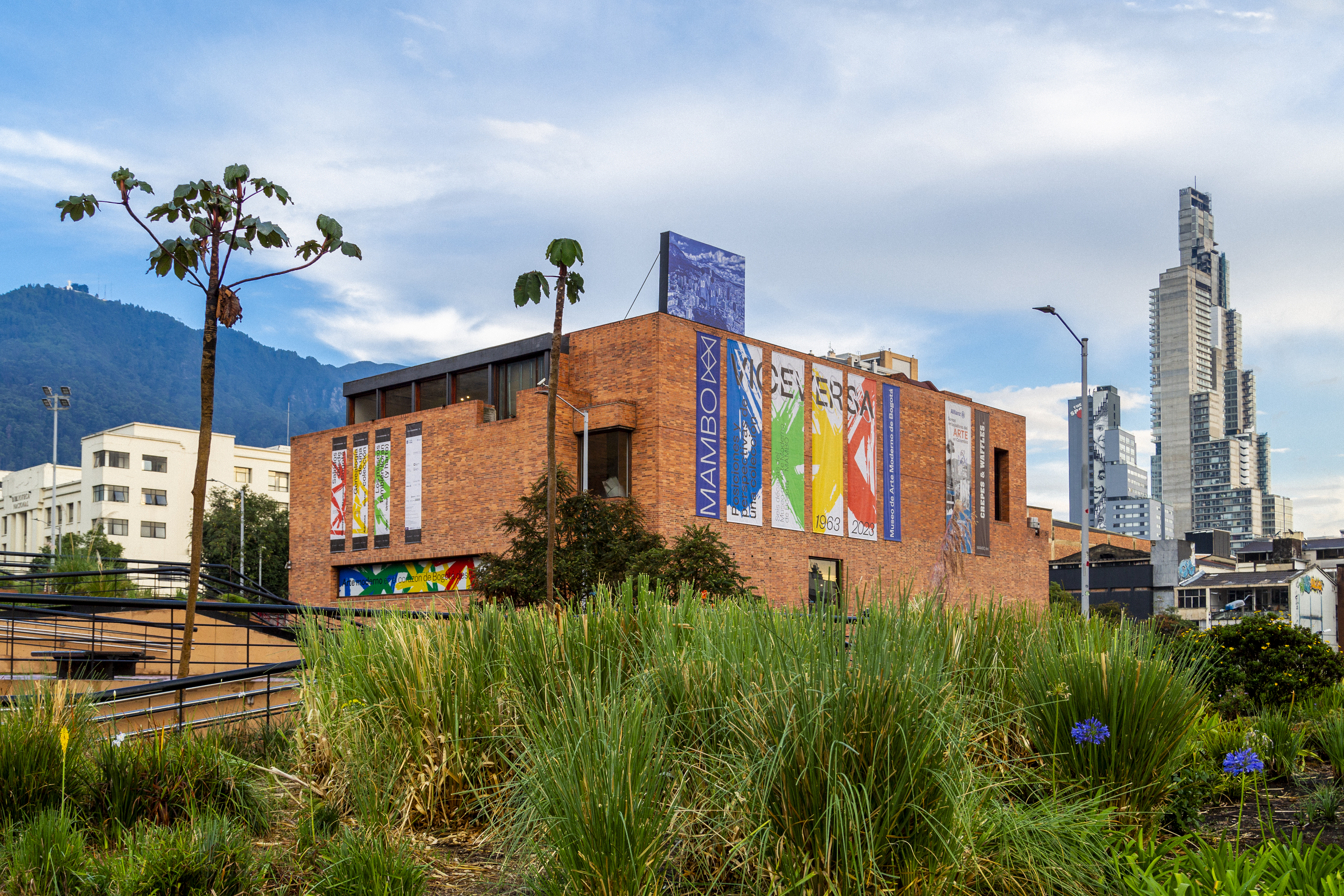

== See also ==
- Museum of Modern Art of Medellín
- Colombia art

== General references ==
- El Mambo abre de nuevo sus puertas recargado [The Mambo reopens its doors recharged], Semana, 11 March 2017, archived from the original on 13 June 2024
