= Fanny Mikey =

Argentine-born Colombian actress, theatre producer and entrepreneur

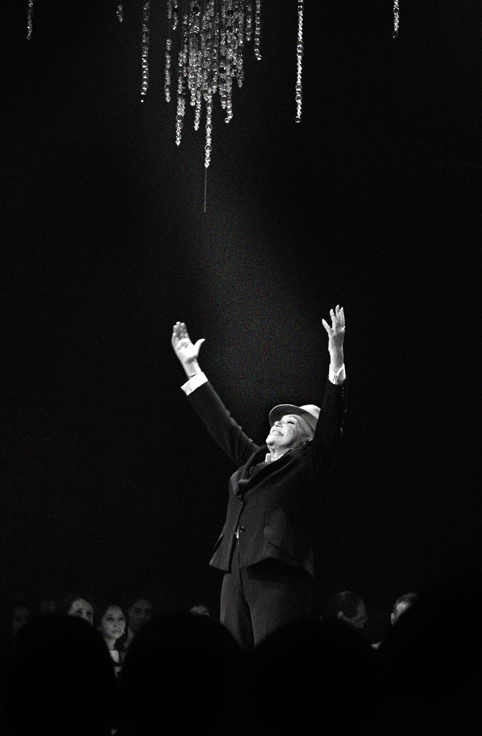
- Fanny Mikey onstage in 2006
- Born: Fanny Elisa Mikey Orlanszky c. 1930; Buenos Aires, Argentina
- Died: 16 August 2008; Cali, Cauca Valley, Colombia
- Citizenship: Colombian
- Occupations: Actor, Theatre producer
- Years active: 1958–2008
- Organization: http://teatronacional.co
- Known for: Founder and organizer of the Ibero-American Theater Festival of Bogotá http://festivaldeteatro.com.co
- Spouse: Gastón Djian (divorced)
- Partner: Enrique Álvarez (deceased)
- Children: Daniel Álvarez Mikey
- Parent(s): José Mikeaj; Celia Orlanszky

Fanny Elisa Mikey Orlanszky (c. 1930 – 16 August 2008) was an Argentine-born Colombian actress, theatre producer and entrepreneur. She lived and worked in Colombia from 1959 until her death and was the creator and organizer of the Bogotá Ibero-American Theatre Festival, known as the biggest theatre festival in the world.

In 1976, she moved to Bogotá, when she created the Fundación Teatro Nacional (National Theatre Foundation), an organization to promote the arts in Colombia and that featured adaptations of famous plays (Dona Flor and Her Two Husbands, The Vagina Monologues, and Closer) among others.

== Personal life ==
Born to a Lithuanian Jewish family who emigrated to Argentina following czarist anti-Semitism sentiment in the Russian Empire, Fanny Elisa was the eldest of six children of José Mikeaj (or Mikey, as the immigration officials changed it to upon arrival to Argentina) and Celia Orlanszky. She married at a young age to Gastón Dijan, a young man with a Sephardic Jewish background, but the fruitless relation soon ended because of their cultural differences, and her husband's inability to accept her acting career. In 1958, she left Argentina to follow the man she loved, Pedro I. Martínez, arriving in Buenaventura by ferry and settling in Santiago de Cali; but once again this relation did not work out given religious differences. In 1976, Mikey and her then love partner Enrique Álvarez adopted a newborn whom they would call Daniel.

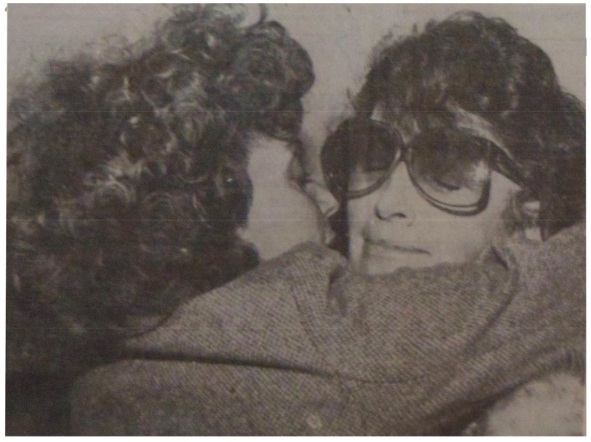
Fanny Mikey seeing off Feliza Bursztyn at El Dorado Airport as she left the country to go into exile in Mexico. August 8, 1981.

== Death ==
At the age of 78, Fanny Mikey died due to complications of renal failure on Saturday 16 August 2008 in Cali, Colombia, where she had travelled to earlier that month to present her latest play, Perfume de arrabal y tango. Her body was transported to Bogotá that same day and taken to the National Theatre, where she lay in repose to a gathering of family, friends, and colleagues. The next morning, her casket was transported in a motorcade to the National Capitol and draped with the flag of Colombia; it was then placed in the Elliptical Chamber of the Capitol where she lay in state for a public viewing. Outside the Capitol, on Bolívar Square, the Bogotá Philharmonic performed Astor Piazzolla's Tangazo and Ludwig van Beethoven's Symphony No. 3 as she had requested, followed by a cappella performances by her friends the bass Valeriano Lanchas, and singers César Mora, Yuri Buenaventura, and Lety Santamaría. Thousands of people went in droves to say their final goodbyes; the event was attended by many celebrities and had the participation of Bogotá's Mayor Samuel Moreno Rojas and Minister of the Interior and Justice, Fabio Valencia Cossio, present on behalf of President Álvaro Uribe Vélez, who was overseas at the time; President Uribe in turn, upon his arrival passed a Presidential Decree honouring her memory and legacy, exalting her as a model citizen and her great contribution to the country.

The next day, her body was taken to Chapinero Cemetery where her remains were cremated; in fulfilment of her wishes, half were sent to Argentina to be given to her family for safekeeping, the other half was scattered at the Islas del Rosario where she owned an island and had a house.

== See also ==
- Sonia Osorio
- Consuelo Araújo Noguera
