= Architecture of Colombia =

Colombia's architectural heritage includes Spanish colonial architecture, such as Catholic churches. Its modern architecture represents various International Style architecture. In the postmodern architecture era, a wave of innovate and striking buildings have been designed.

Colombian cultural heritage includes indigenous, European, Indian and African influences. The country's colonial buildings reflect their Spanish (and particularly Andalusian origin, as seen in the traditional single-story) houses laid around a central patio, to be found both in colonial towns such as Santafé (Bogotá), Tunja or Cartagena, or in rural haciendas throughout the country. After gaining its independence, Colombia severed its links with Spain and looked elsewhere for new models, first England, then France, marking the beginning of what became known as Republican Architecture (Arquitectura republicana), an era that lasted well into the twentieth century, when the changes in architectural thinking in Europe brought Modern Architecture to the country during the last years before World War II.

Prominent Colombian architects include Rafael Esguerra, Daniel Bermúdez, Giancarlo Mazzanti, Rogelio Salmona, Álvaro Barrera, Patricio Samper Gnecco, Bruce Graham, Laureano Forero Ochoa, Pedro Nel Gómez, Raúl Fajardo Moreno, Rafael Esguerra, Arturo Robledo Ocampo and Simón Vélez. Firms include plan:B.

Jorge Arango, Andres Cortes, Jaime Correa and Felipe Hernandez (architect) were born in Colombia. Bruce Graham worked in Colombia. Expats such as Leopold Rother worked in Colombia.

== Indigenous architecture ==
=== Muisca ===
Pre-Columbian architecture was varied. The Muisca, although portrayed as the summit of Colombian indigenous civilization, was modest compared to Mesoamerica or the Inca Empire. Their architecture was limited to rather small settlements and structures, made out of wood and clay instead of stone.

=== Tairona ===
Some other pre-Columbian civilizations are known for their architecture, such as the Tairona (known for Ciudad Perdida) and the culture of Tierradentro.

== Colonial period ==
Colombian architecture reflects seventeenth-century Spanish colonial origins. Regional differences derive from those found in Spain. Thus, hints of Moorish and Castilian architecture are evident in many cities. Many areas have had difficulty maintaining older structures, and the climate has destroyed many Baroque buildings. The many churches that dot the landscape are among the country's architectural gems, whose interiors reflect the influence of Medieval and Renaissance churches in Spain. Newer buildings in larger cities utilize modern styles with adaptations of the Baroque style supplemented with wood and wrought-iron elements.

== Modern architecture in Colombia ==
In the 1930s, Colombia began to embrace modern architecture. The new Liberal Party government tore down many older buildings that were replaced with buildings influenced by the International style. According to architectural historian Silvia Arango, Colombian modern architecture had two moments: a first one called the "Boast of technique", that, starting from the 40s, assimilated and replicated foreign influence through the use of modern techniques (as concrete structures and prefabricated pieces), and a second one, called the "Conscious assimilation", that used some the technical and stylistic elements from the modern movement and mixed it with local materials and formal languages that didn't coincide with the Modern canon.

=== Housing developments ===
Until the mid-1940s, most Colombians lived in single-family dwellings built of cinder blocks and covered with an adobe made of clay, cow manure, and hay. Uncontrolled urban growth due to massive migration from rural areas resulted in large unplanned settlements in cities. There have been a few notable examples of high-density housing projects, but most are targeted to the rising middle-class. These include the Centro Antonio Nariño, which followed the principles of Le Corbusier and the Torres del Parque by architect Rogelio Salmona.

== Pre-Columbian and Indigenous architecture ==
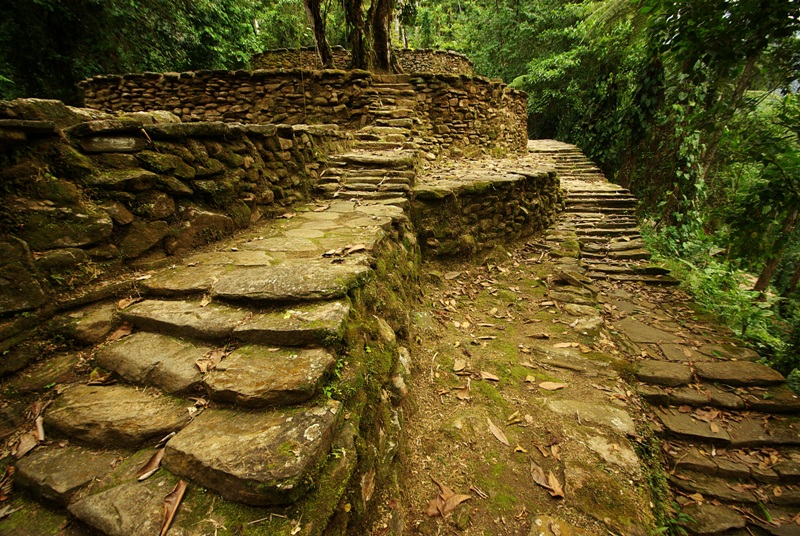
Teyuna (Ciudad Perdida), Tairona, c. 800AD

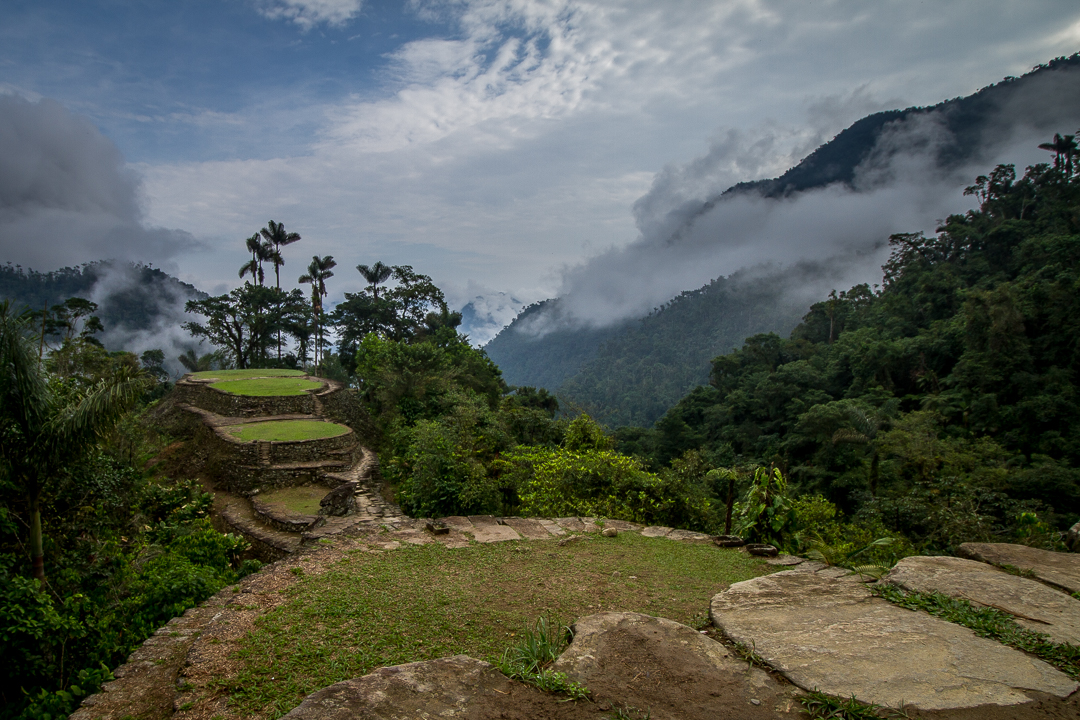
Teyuna (Ciudad Perdida), Tairona, c. 800AD

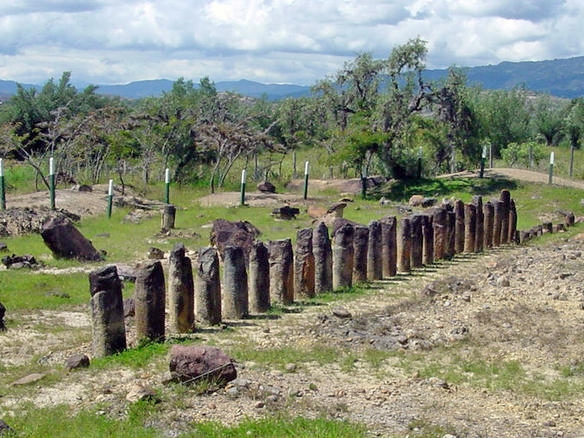
El Infiernito, Muisca, c. 1200–1500AD

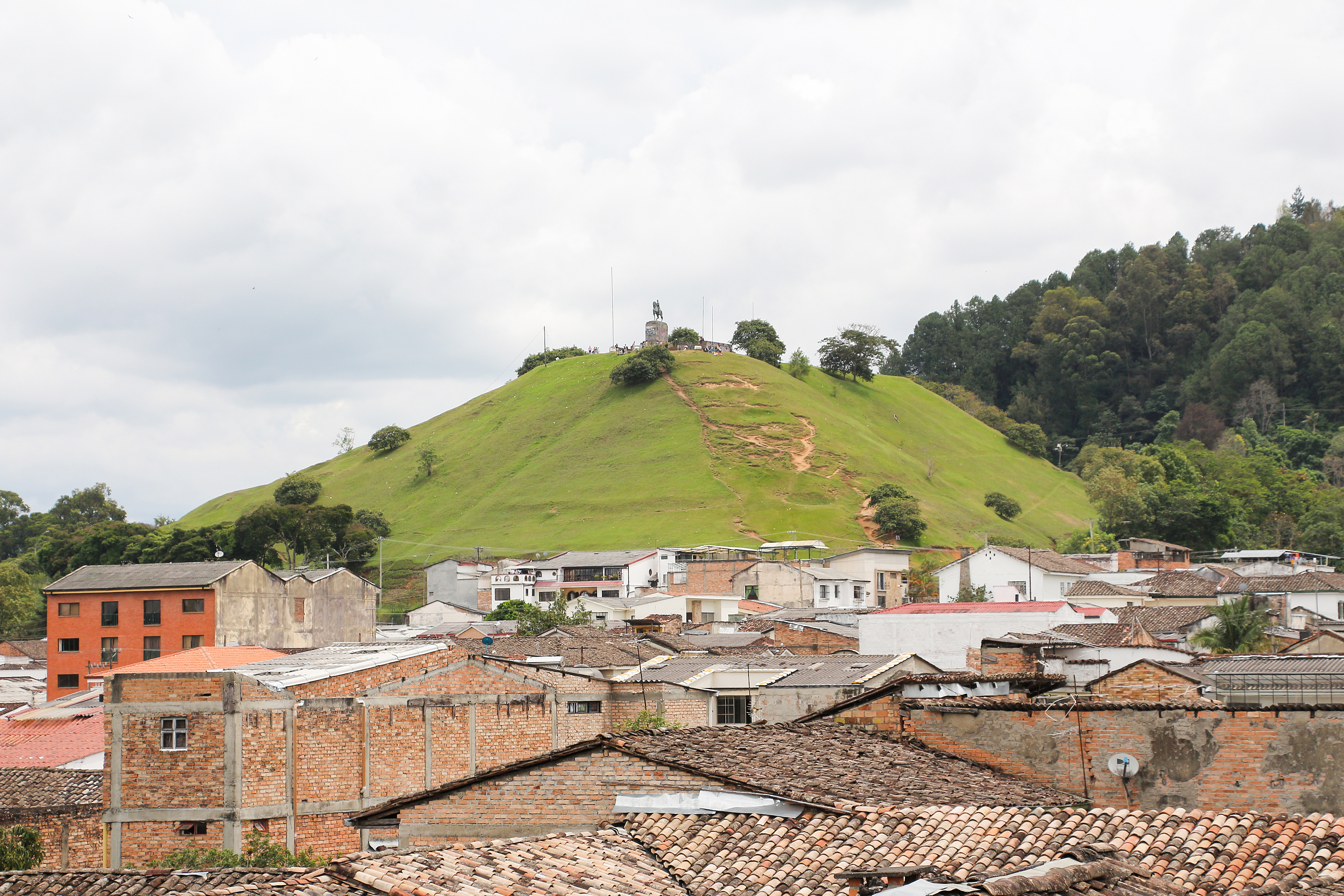
Mound of Tulcán, Pubén, c. 800–1500AD

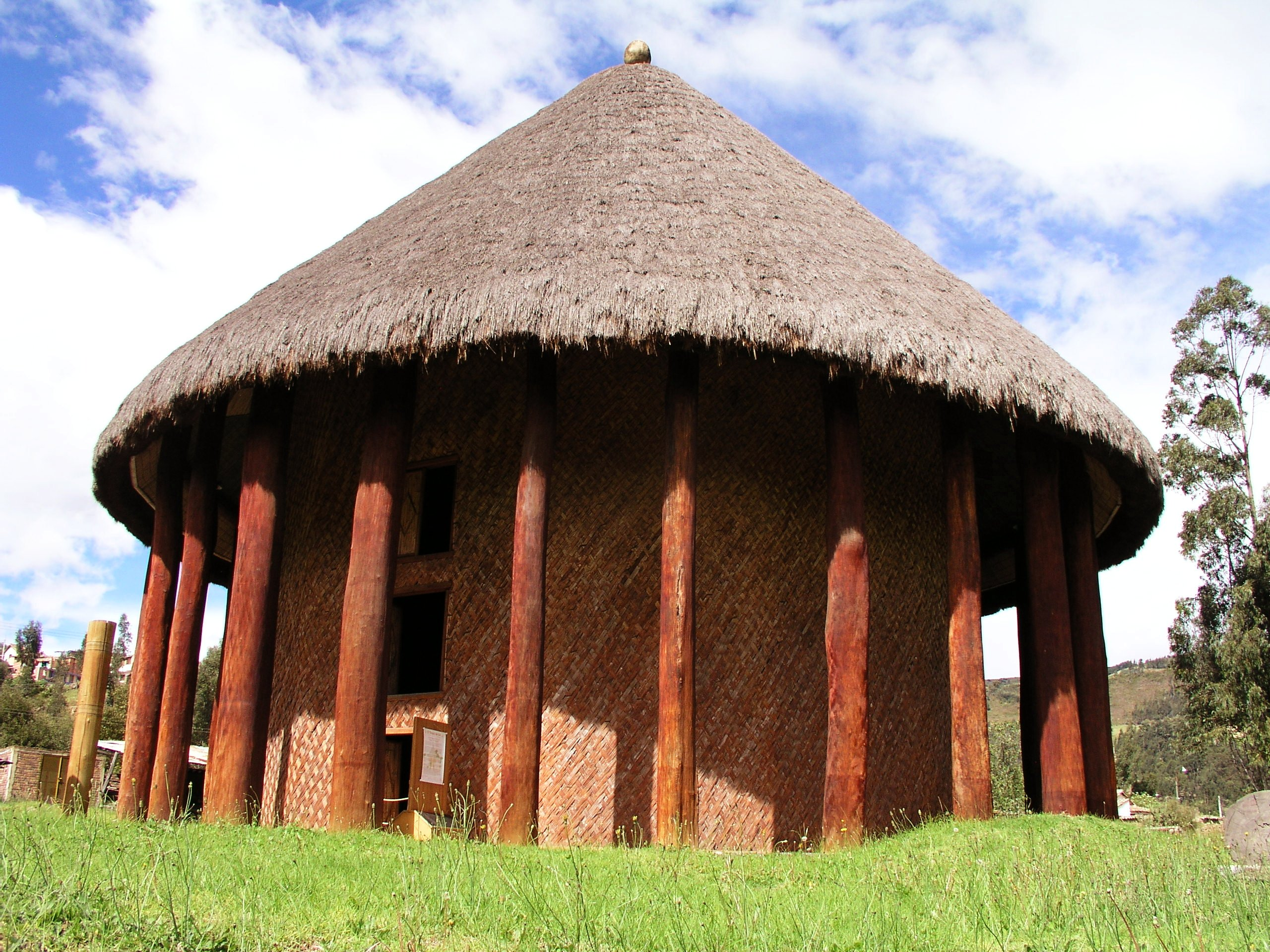
Sun Temple, Muisca, c. 1200–1500AD (Reconstructed, 1942)

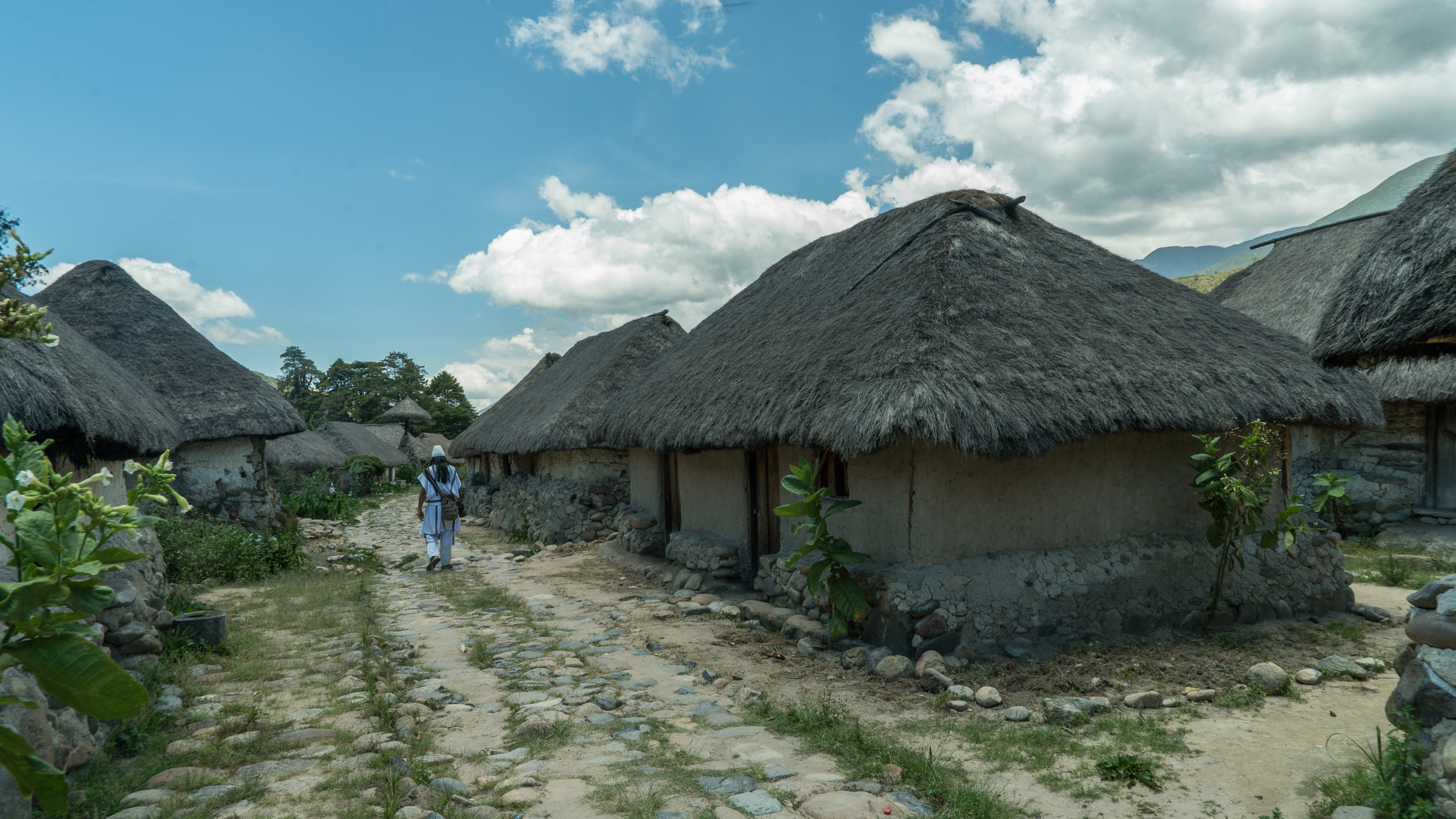
Nabusimake, Arhuaco, c. 800–present

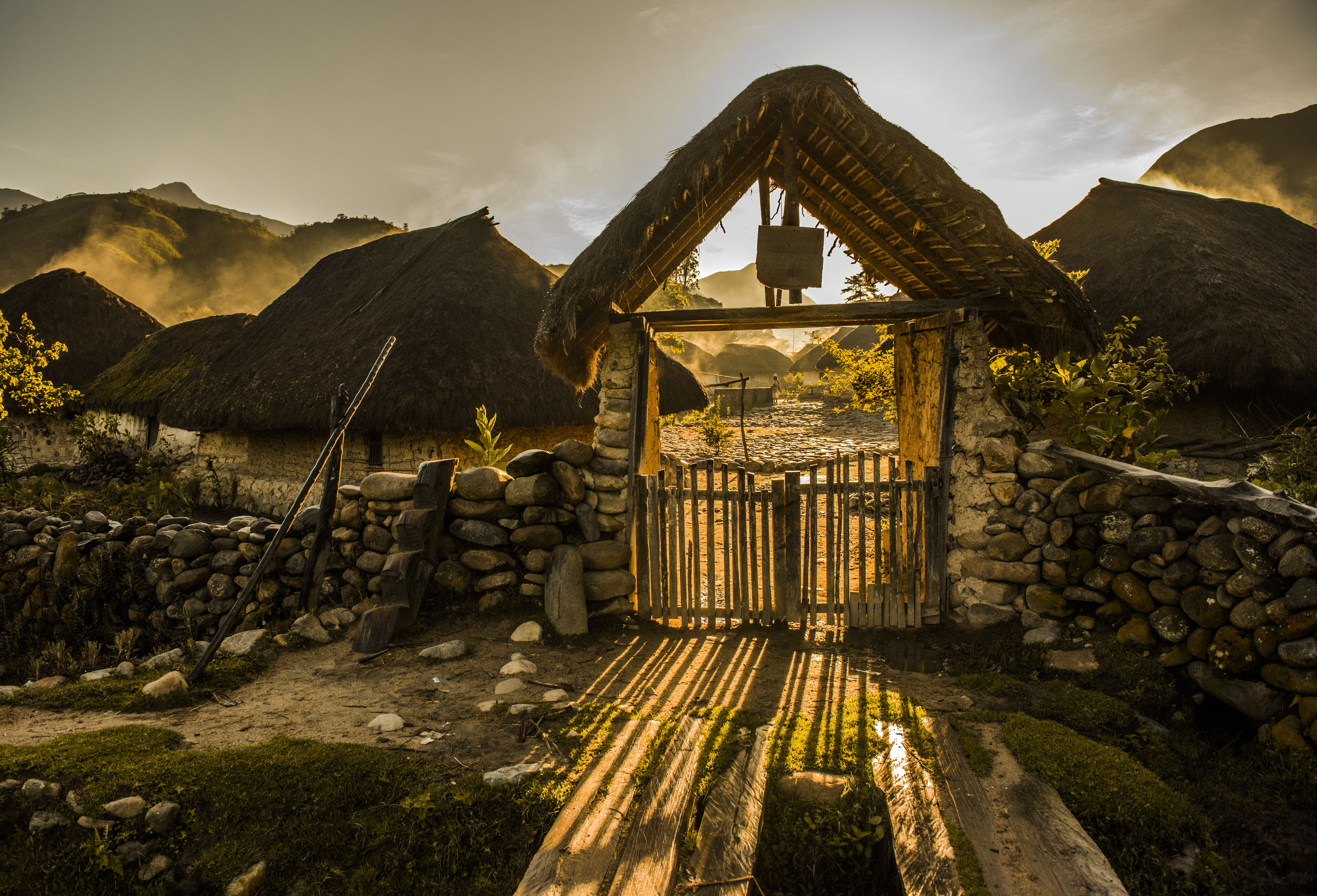
Nabusimake, Arhuaco, c. 800–present

== Spanish Colonial Architecture (c. 1500–1810) ==
=== Caribbean Region ===
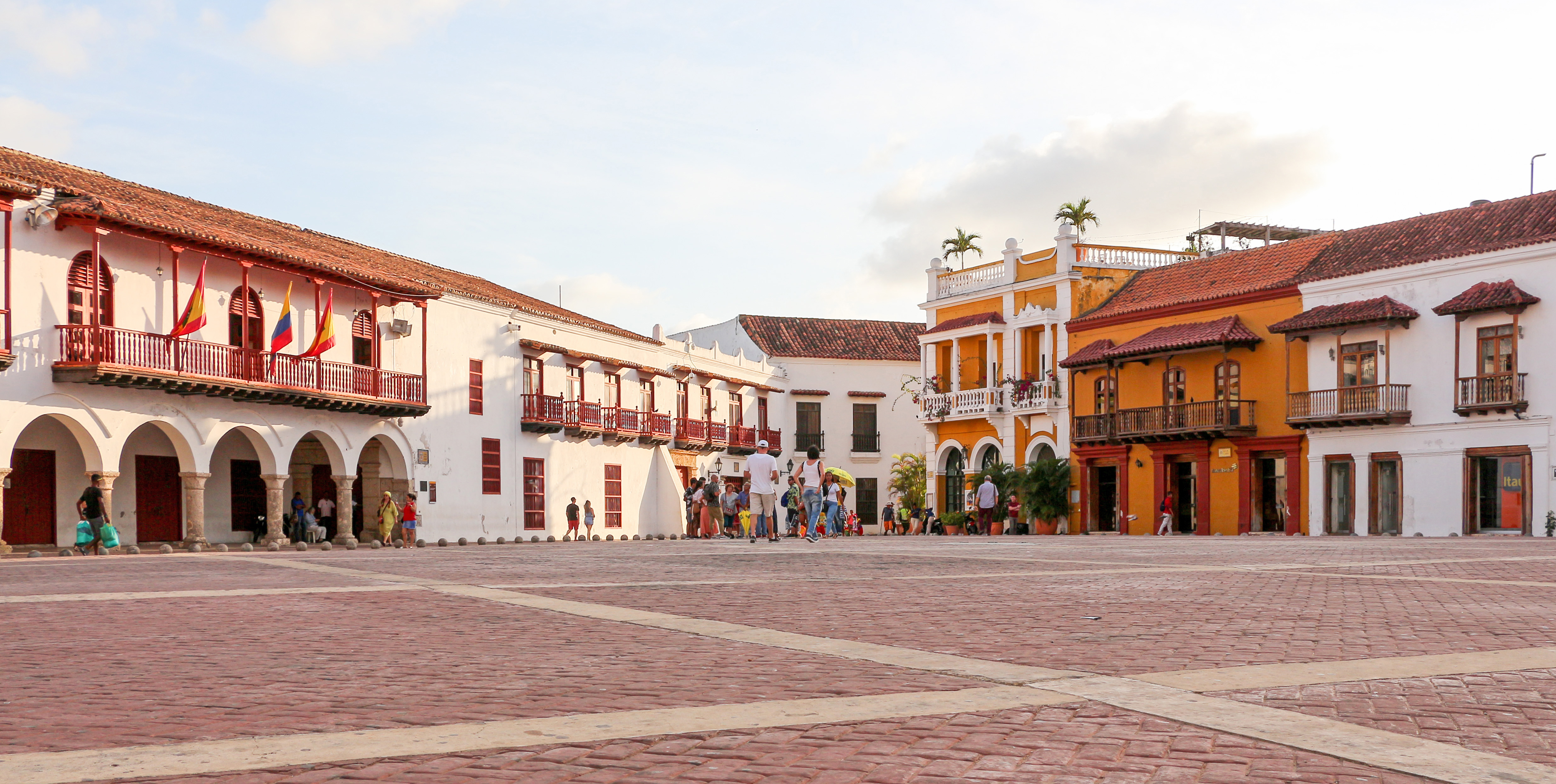
Plaza de la Aduana, Cartagena, Bolívar, c. 1533–1830

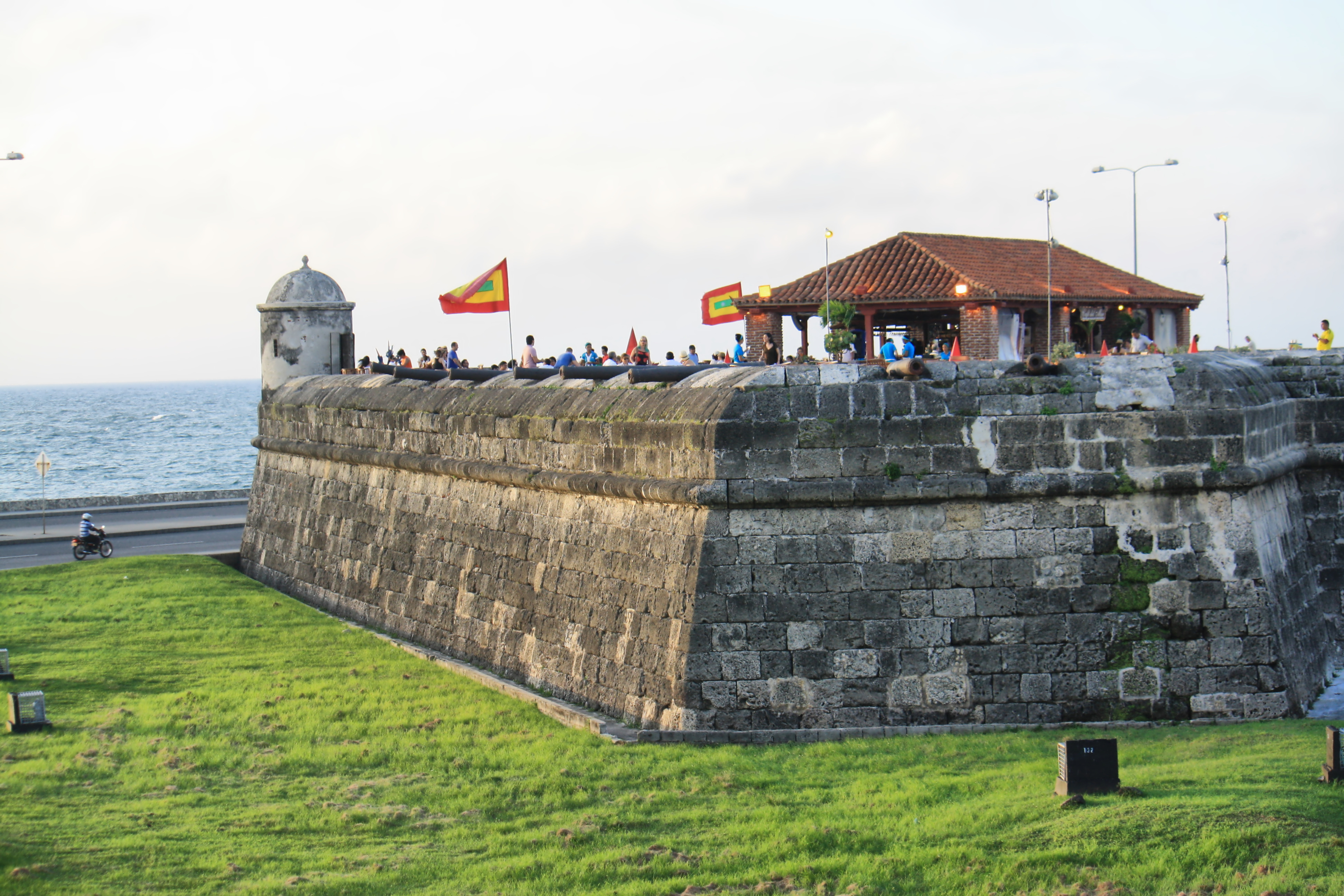
City Walls of Cartagena, Bolívar, 1614–1814

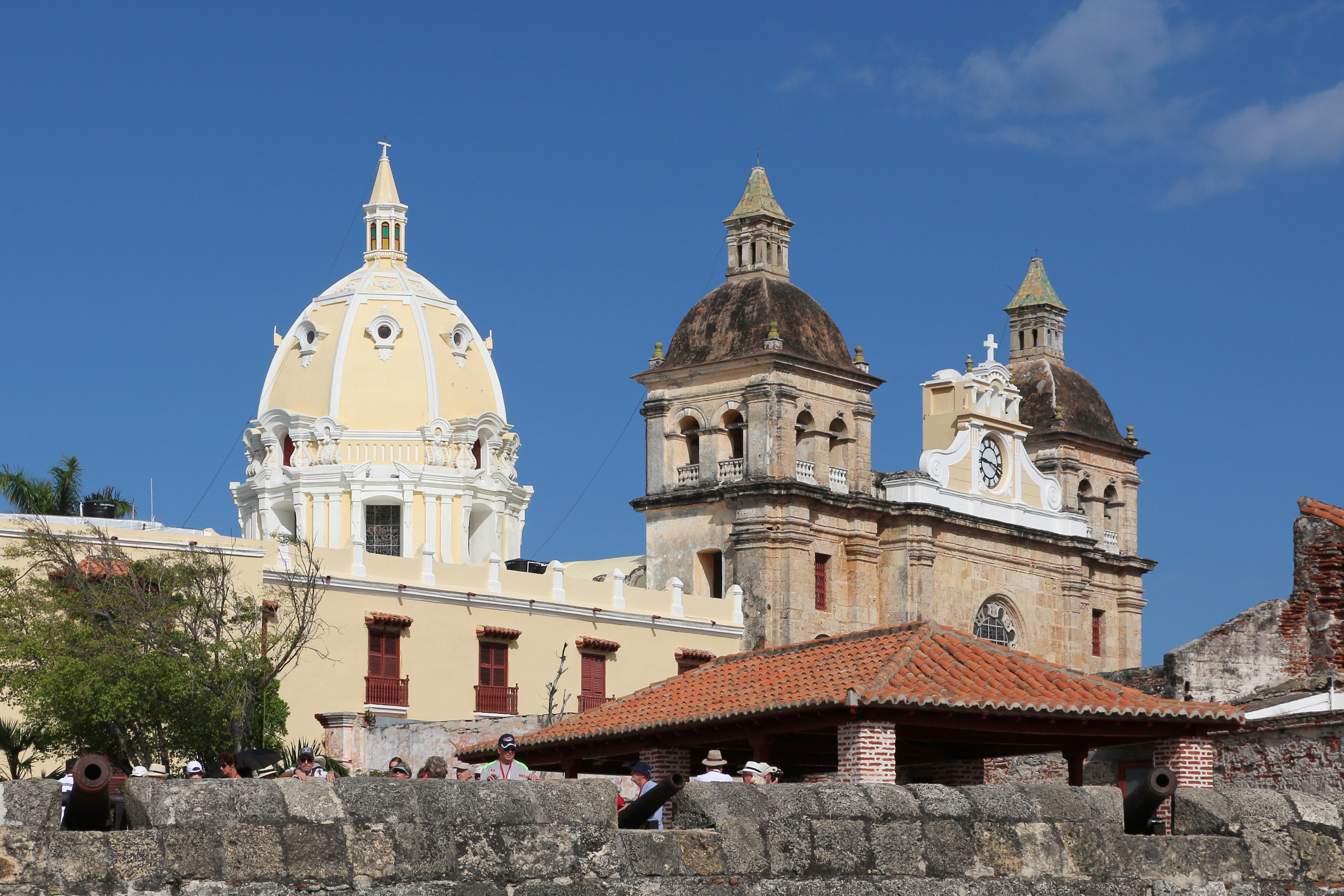
Church of St. Peter Claver, Cartagena, Bolívar, 1580–1654

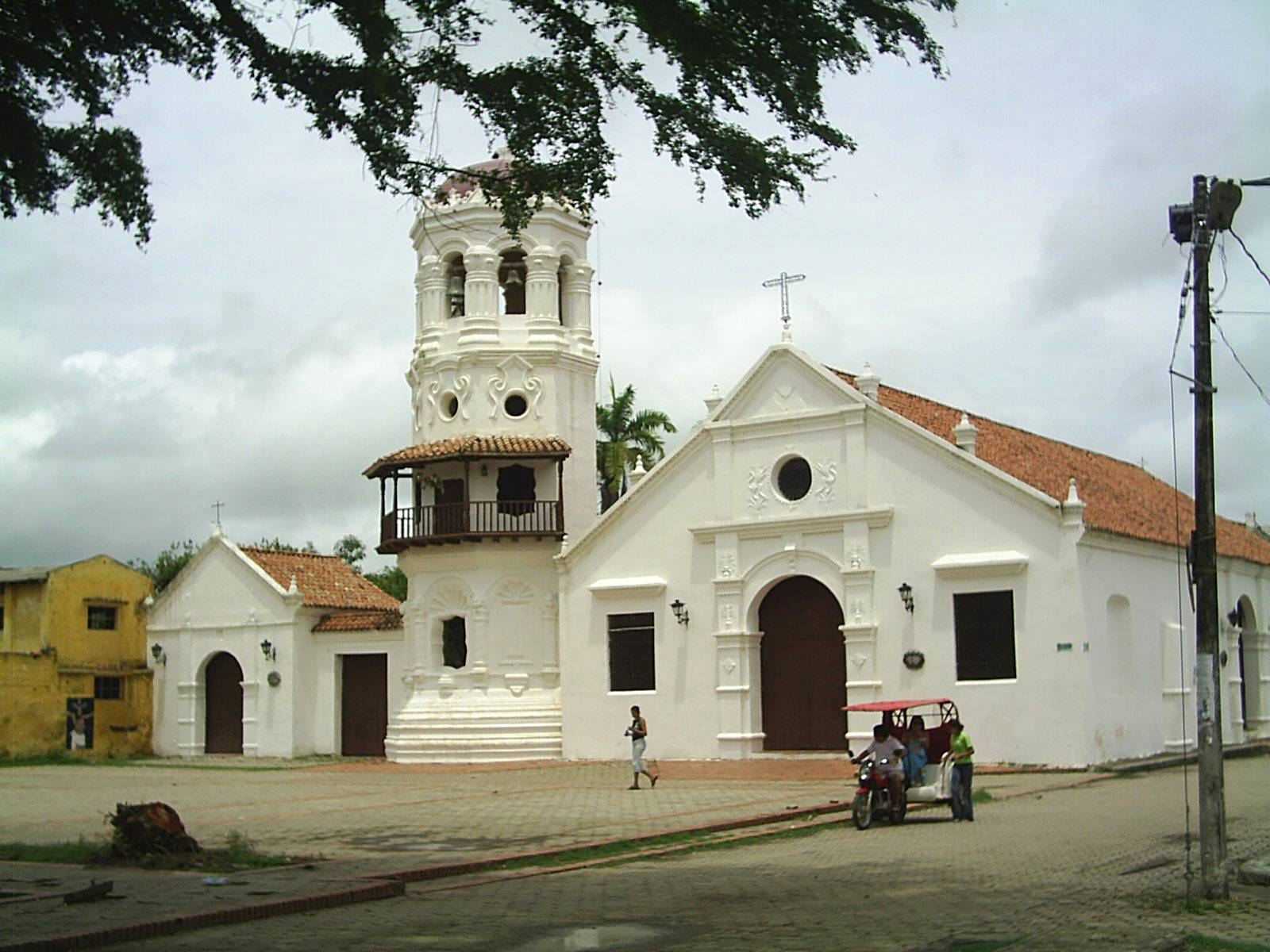
Church of Santa Bárbara, Mompox, Bolívar, 1613

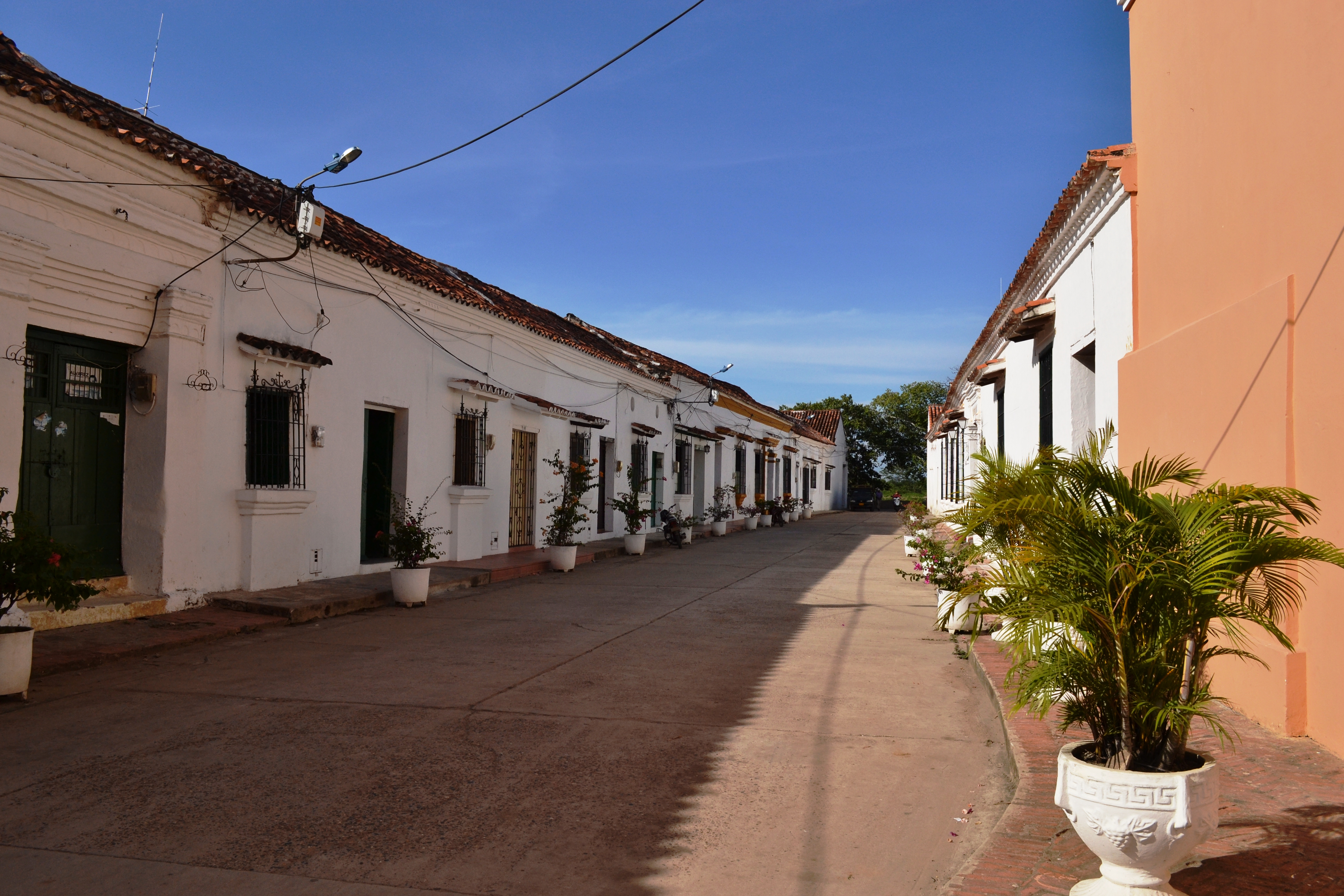
Colonial street in Mompox, Bolívar, c. 1537–1830

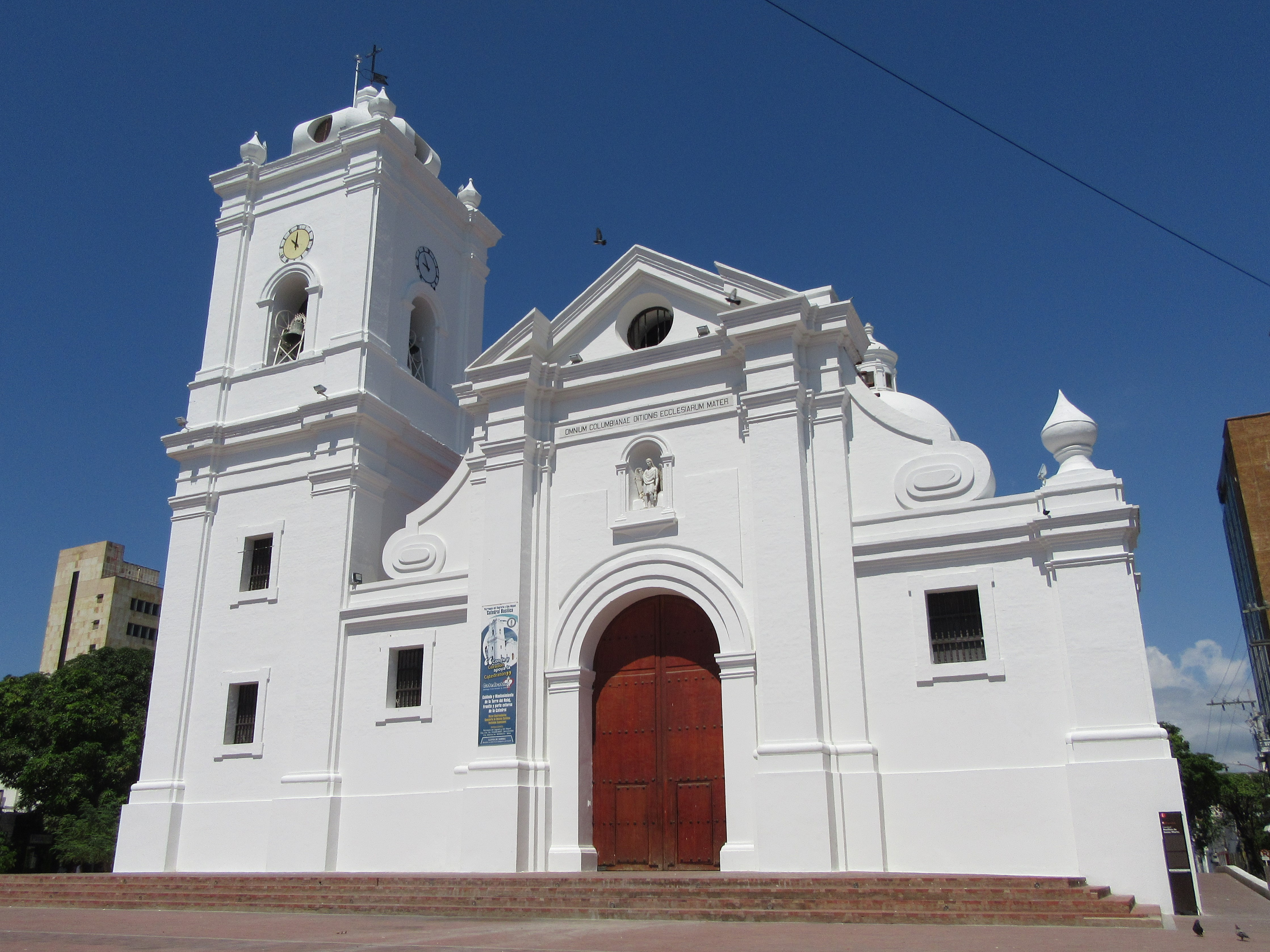
Santa Marta Cathedral, Santa Marta, Magdalena, 1760–1766

=== Andean Region ===
==== Cities and towns ====
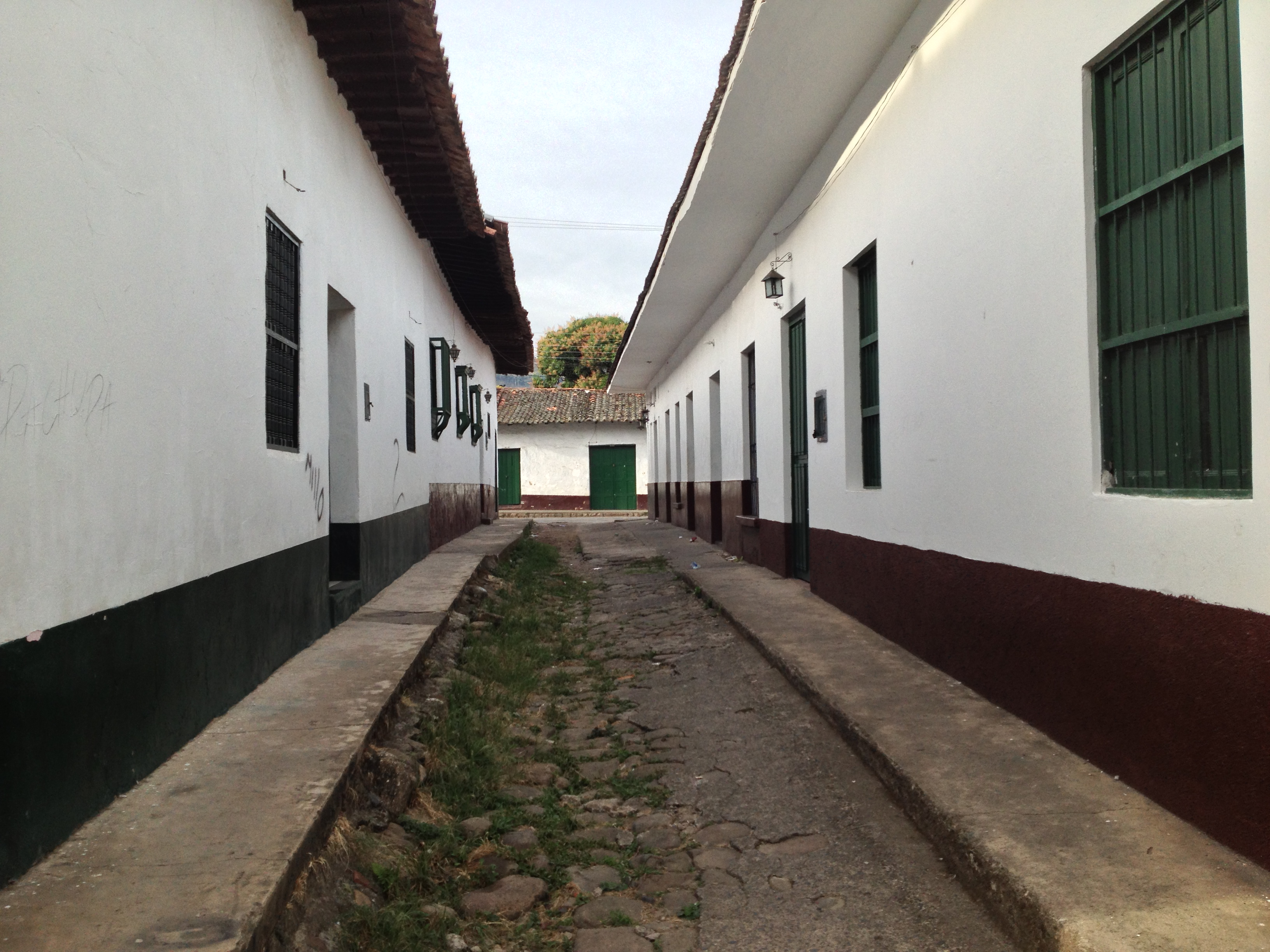
Colonial street in Guaduas, Cundinamarca, c. 1572–1830

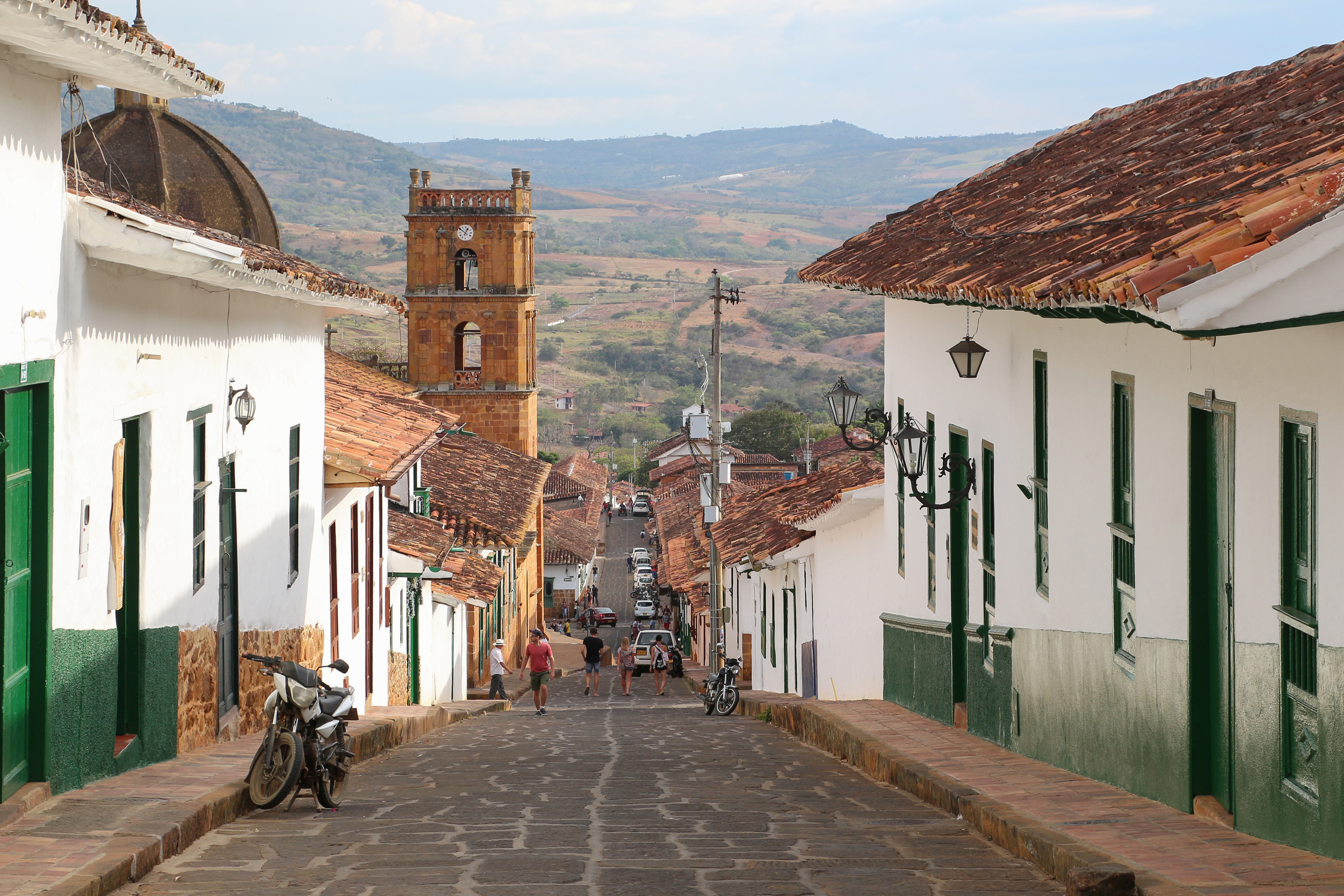
Colonial street in Barichara, Santander, c. 1705–1830

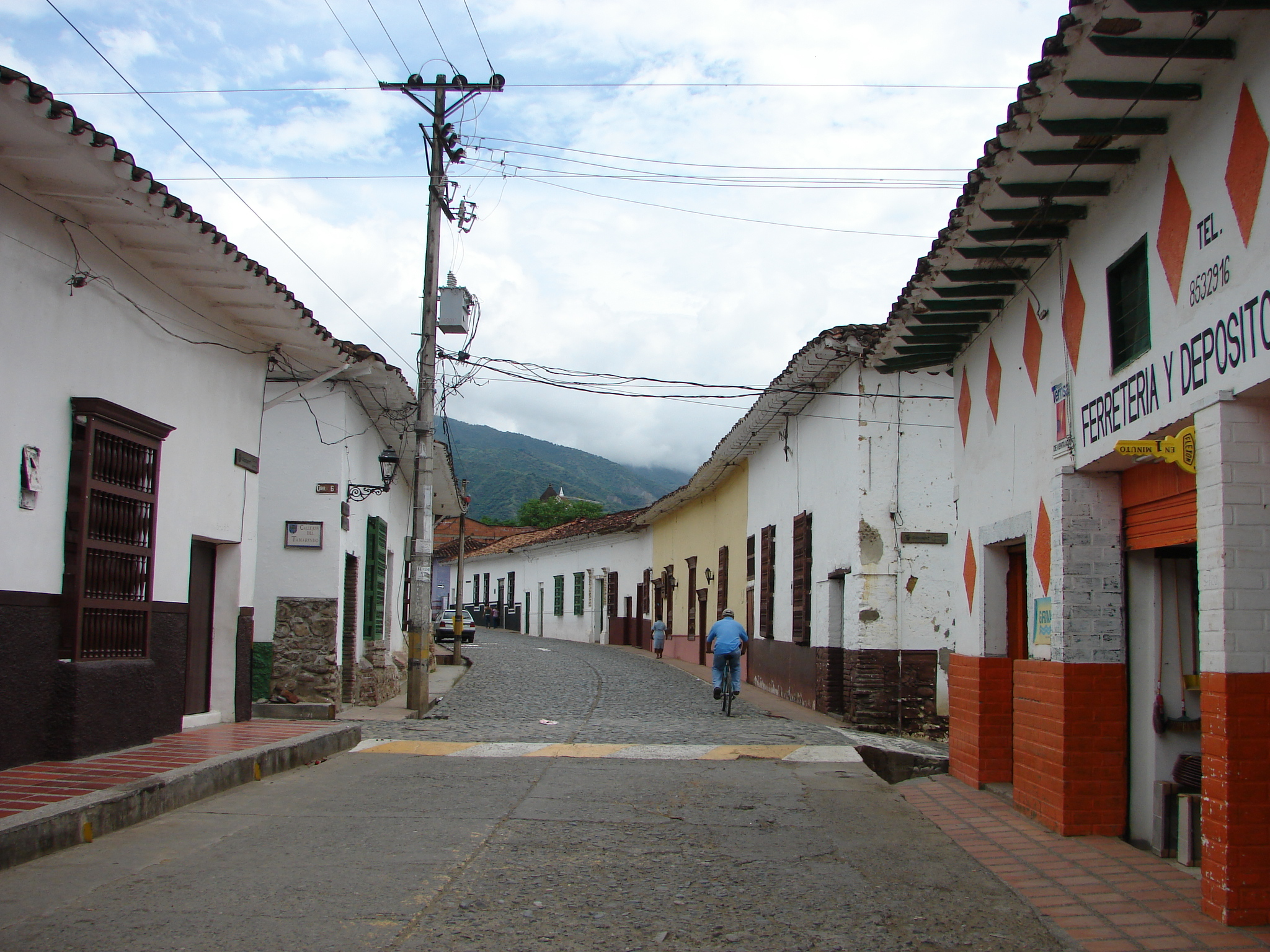
Colonial street in Santa Fe de Antioquia, c. 1541–1830

==== Churches and cathedrals ====
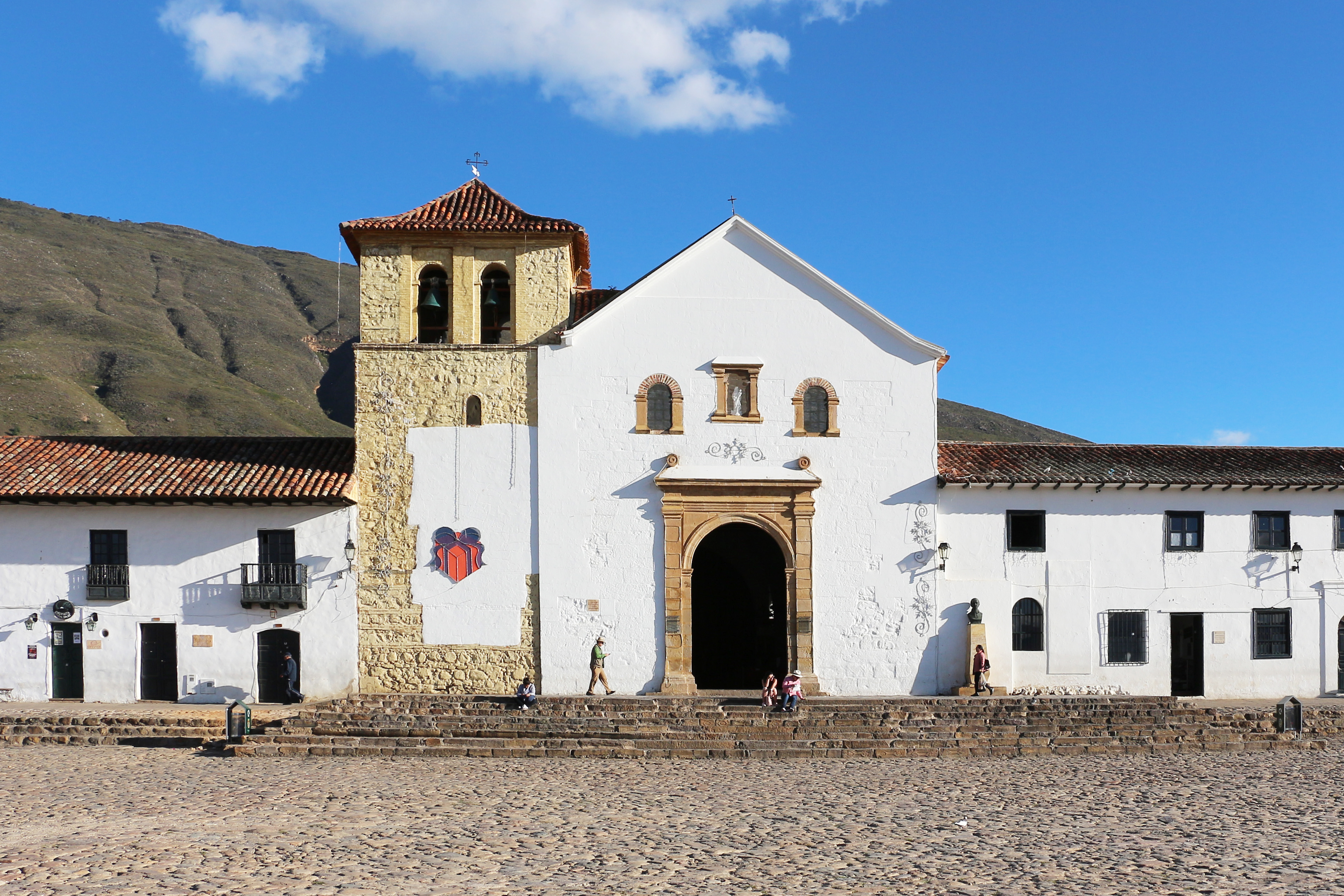
Church of Villa de Leyva, Boyacá, 1604

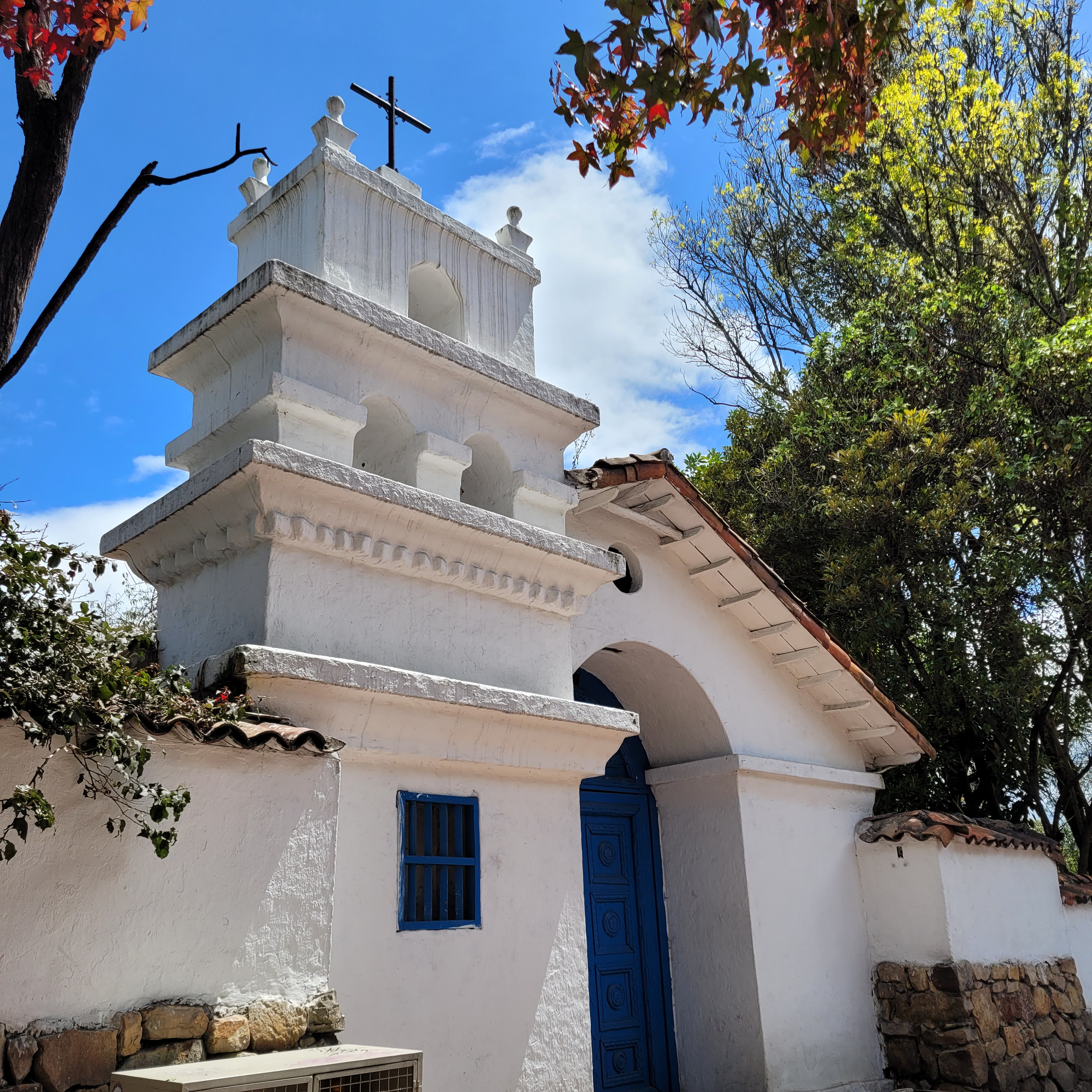
Chapel of the Hacienda San Rafael, Suba, Bogotá, c. 1650

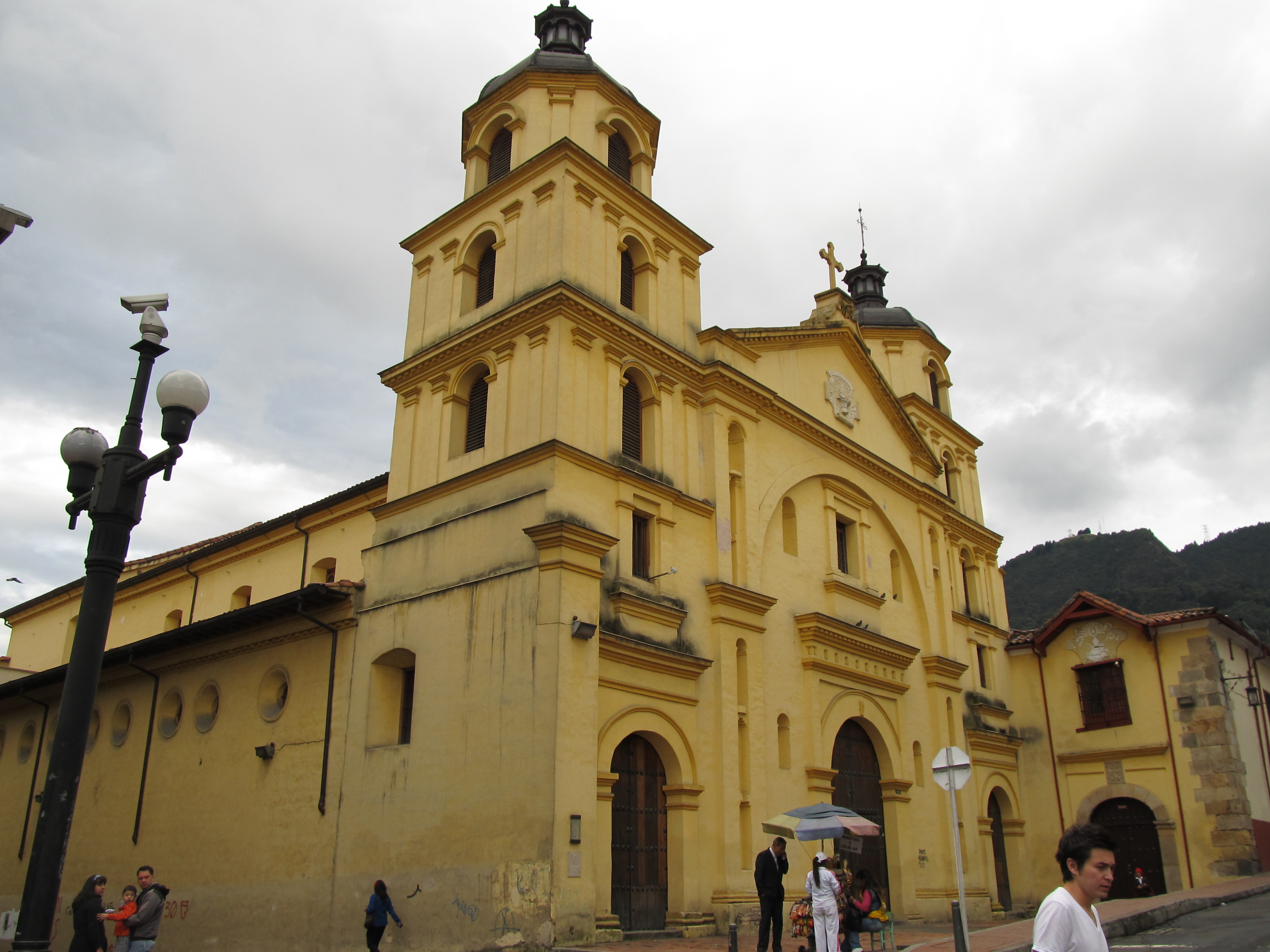
Church of La Candelaria, Bogotá, 1686–1703

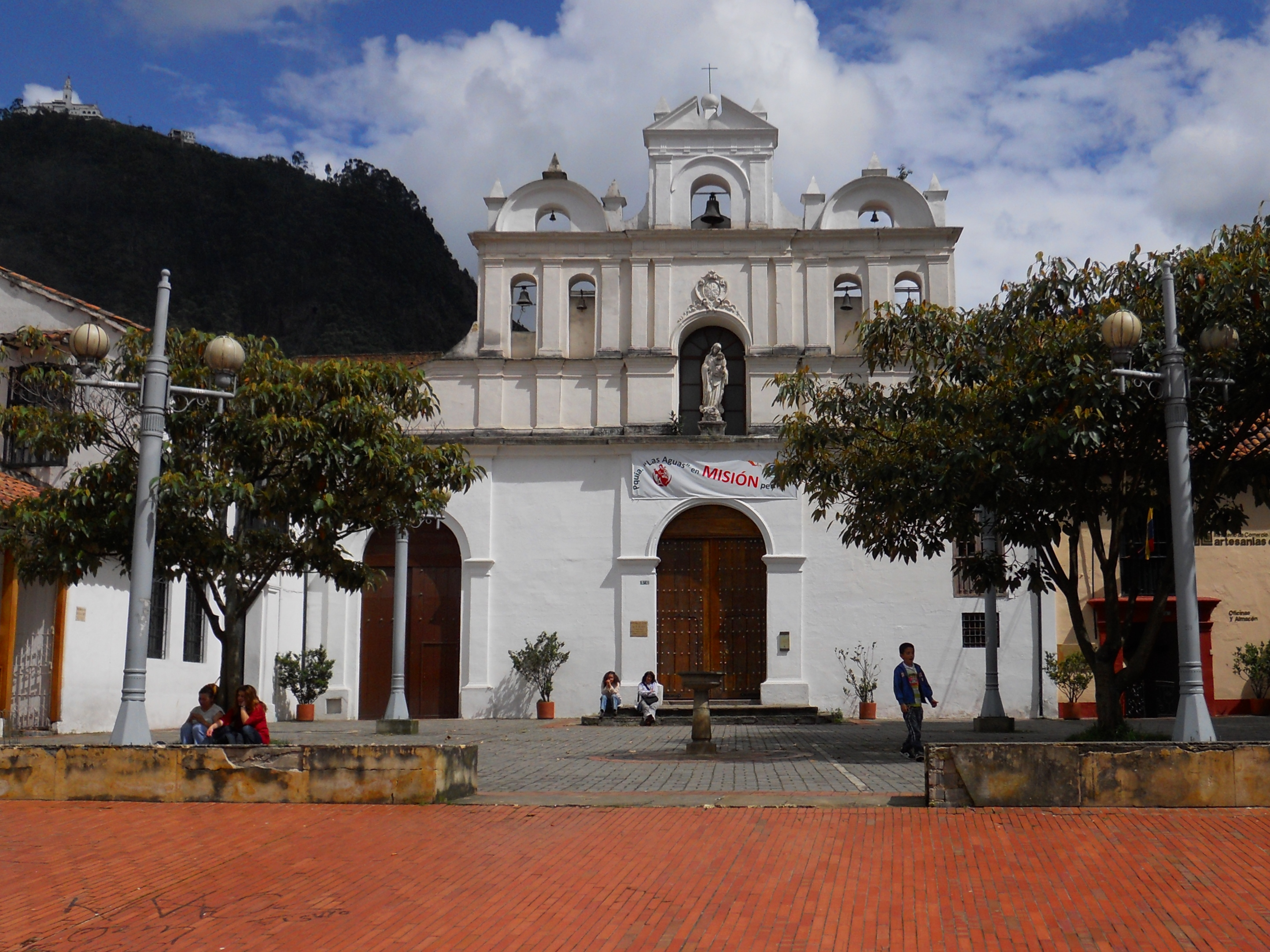
Church of Las Aguas, La Candelaria, Bogotá, 1657–1694

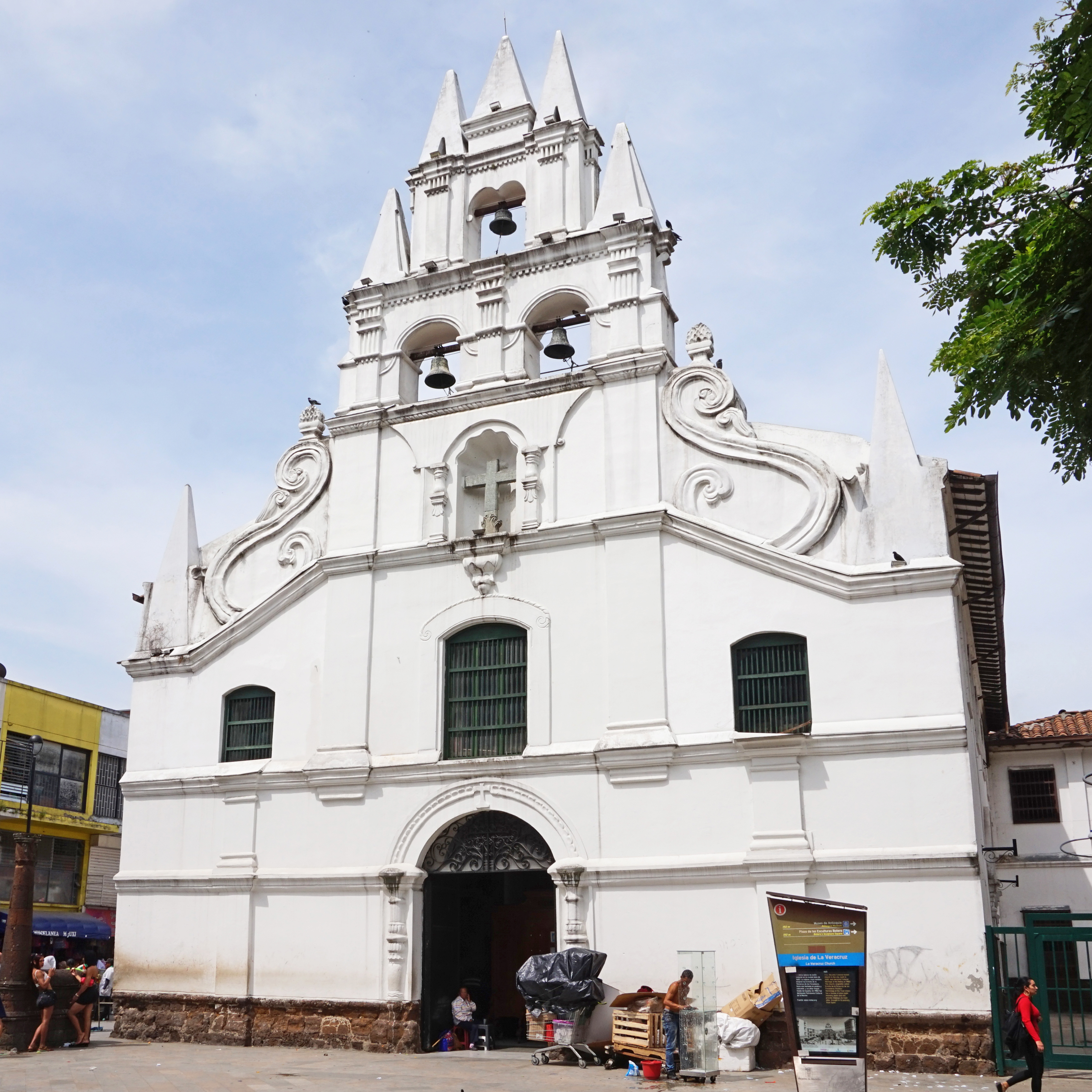
Iglesia de la Veracruz, Medellín

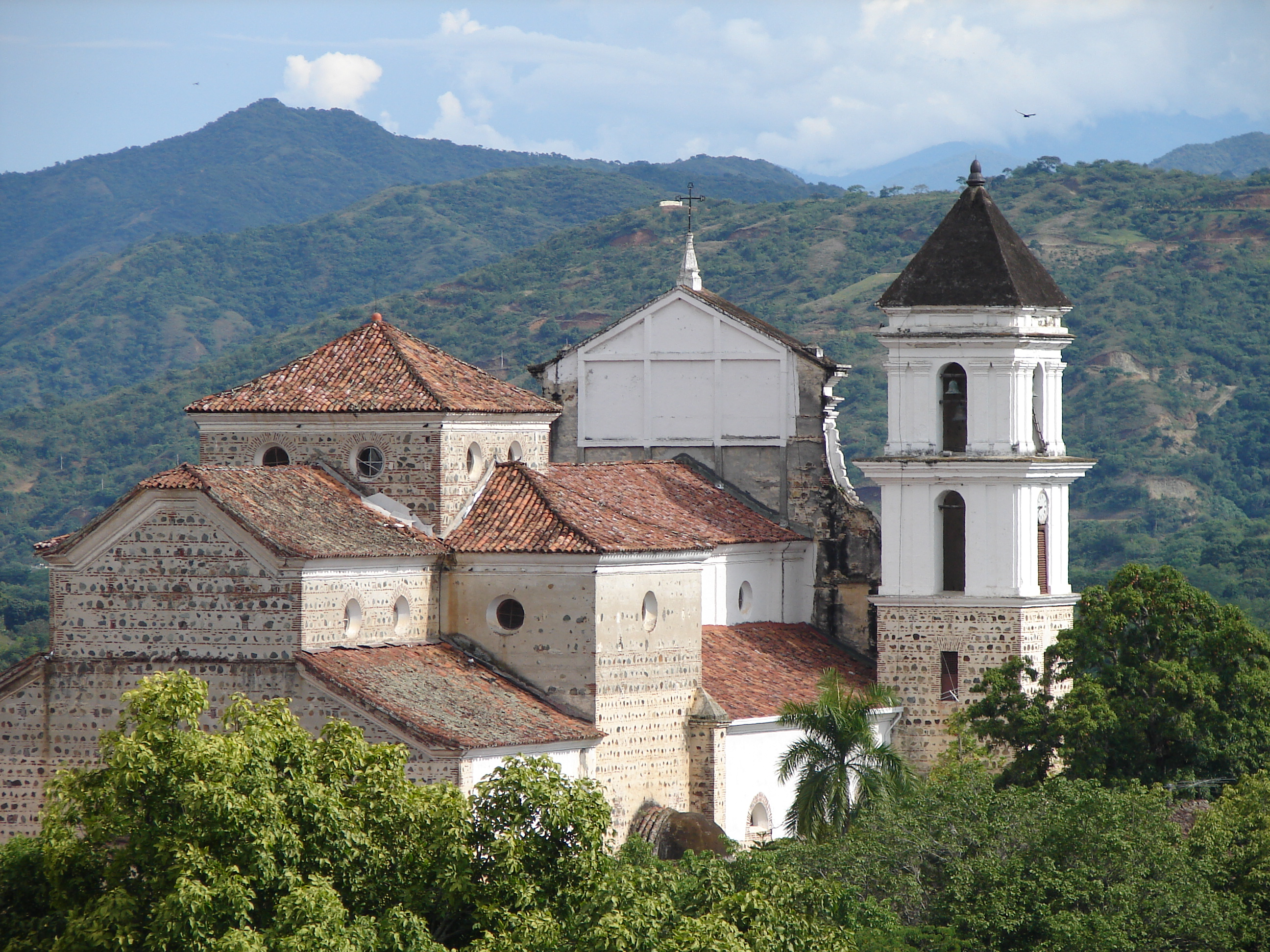
Santa Fe de Antioquia Cathedral

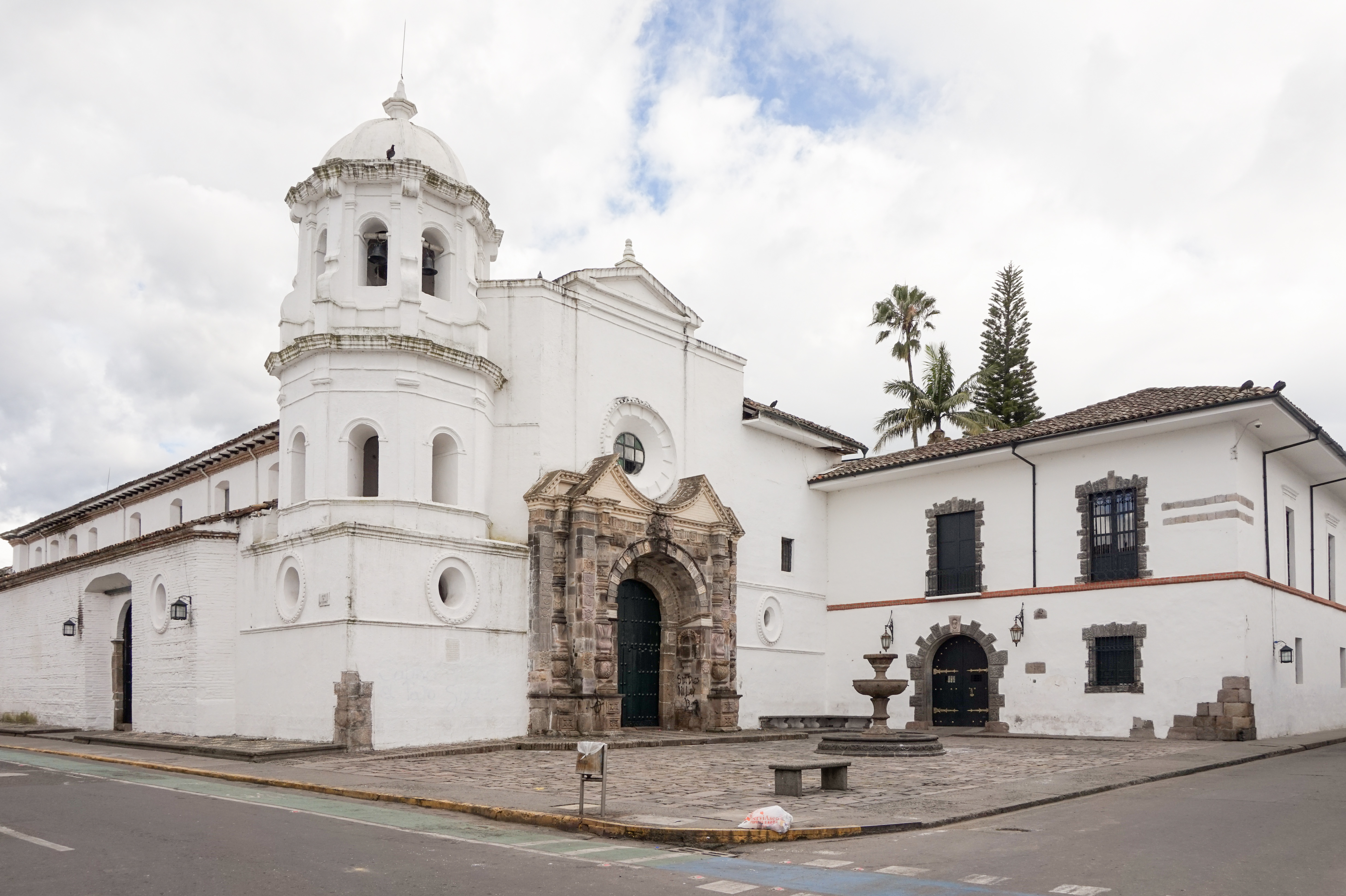
Church of Santo Domingo, Popayán

==== Educational and public buildings ====
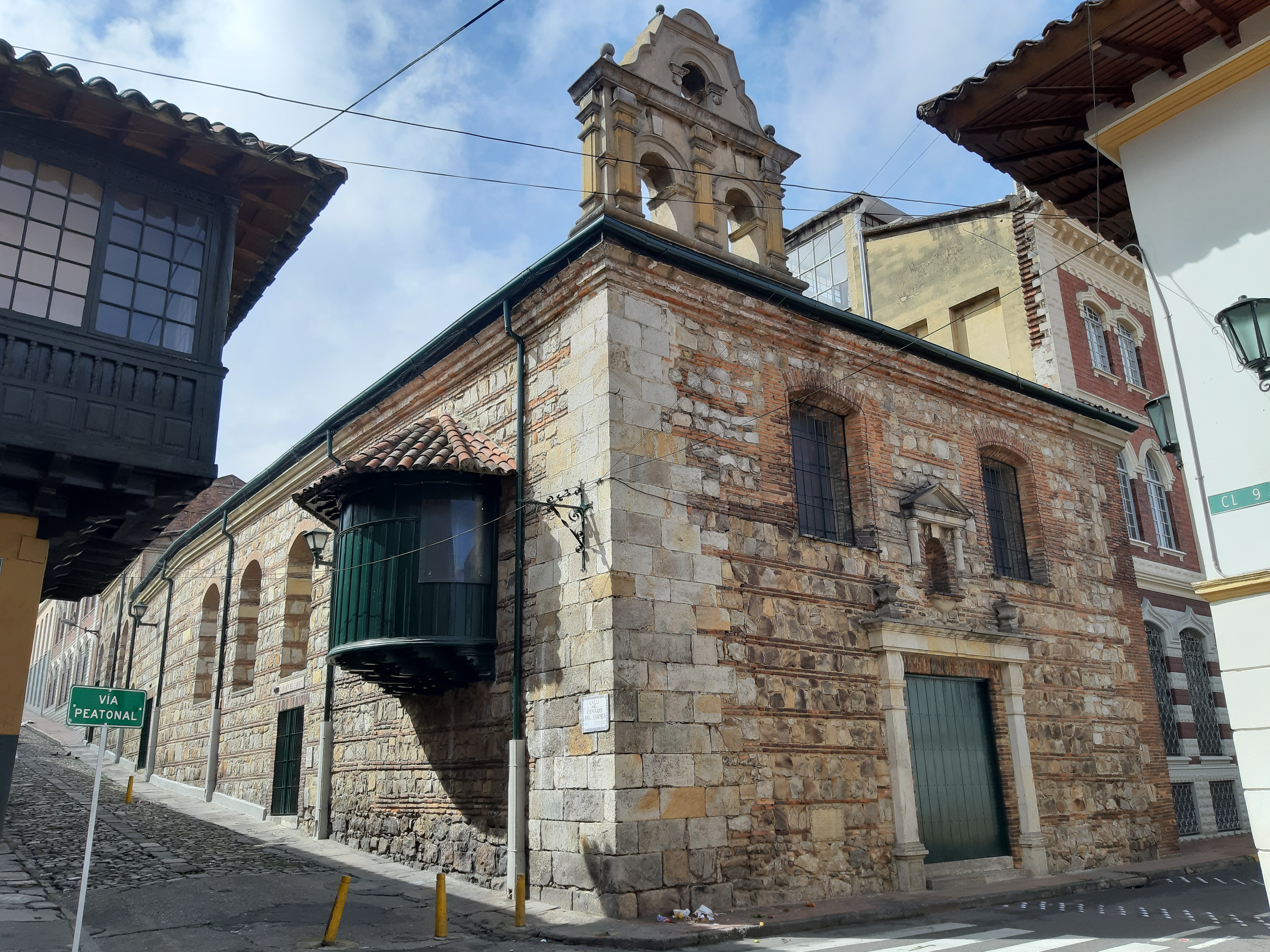
Camarín del Carmen Theatre

==== Domestic architecture ====
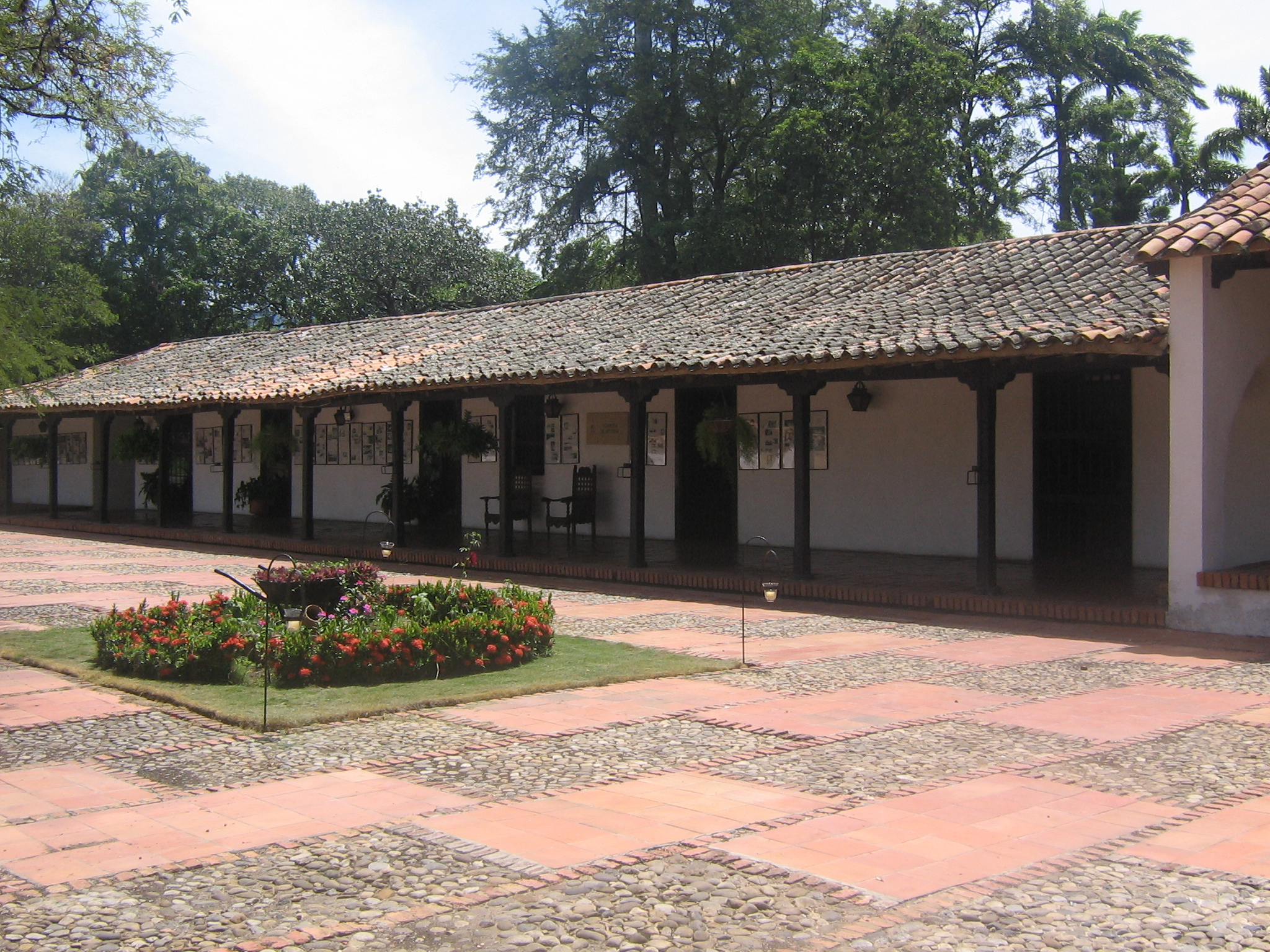
House of Francisco de Paula Santander, Cúcuta

== Republican Architecture (c. 1810–1920) ==
=== Government buildings ===
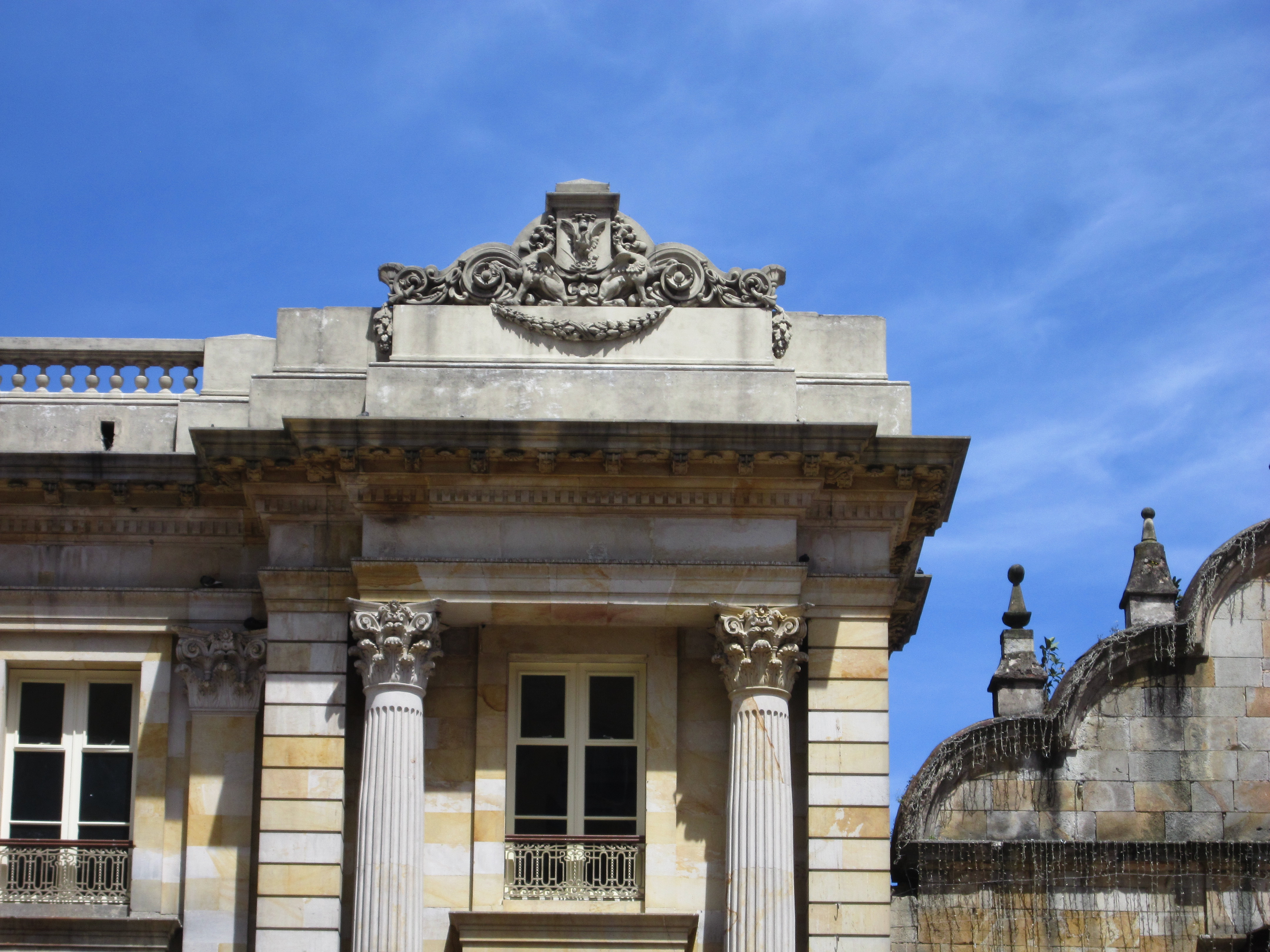
Palace of San Francisco, Santa Fe, Bogotá, 1918–1933

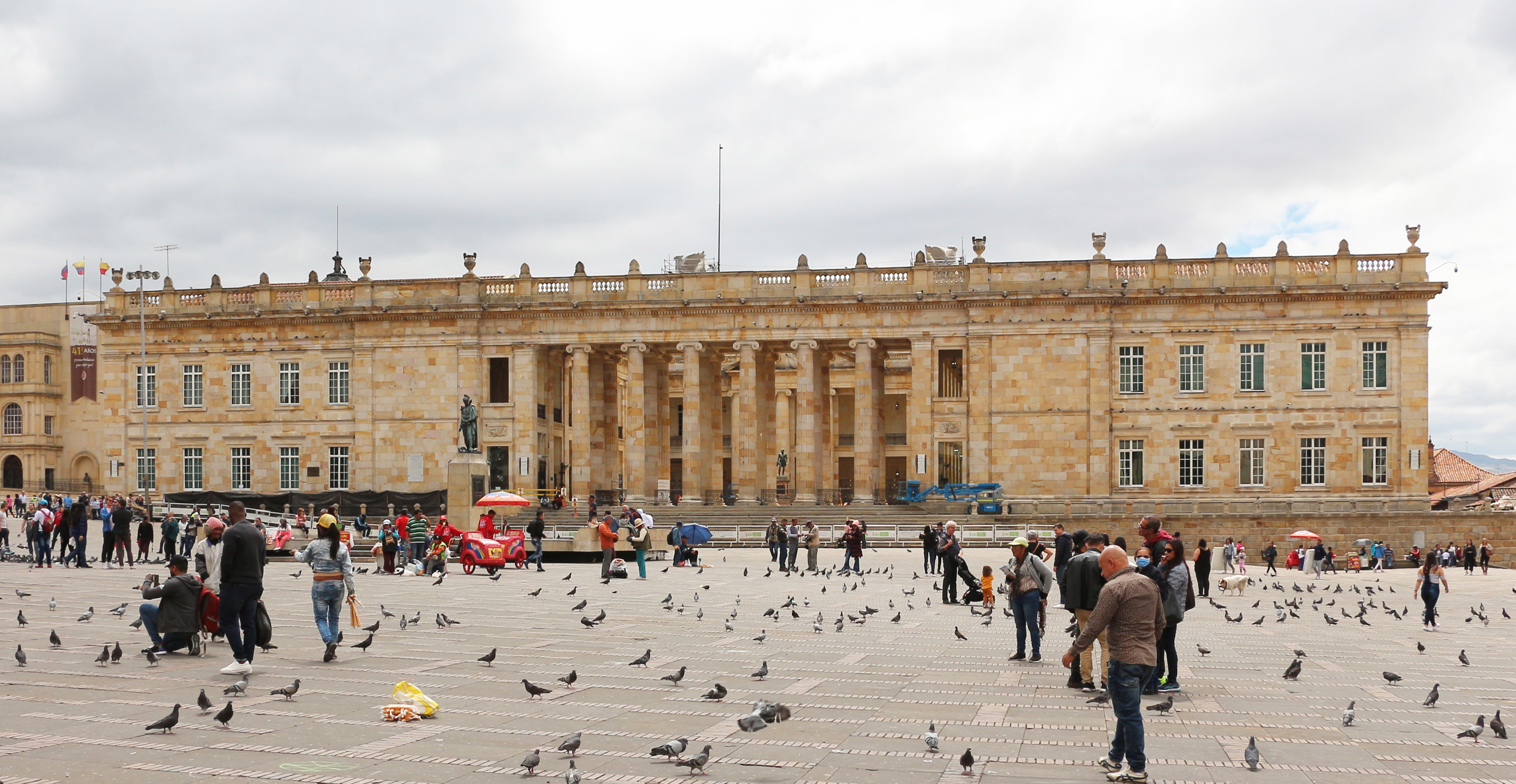
National Capitol of Colombia, La Candelaria, Bogotá, 1848–1926

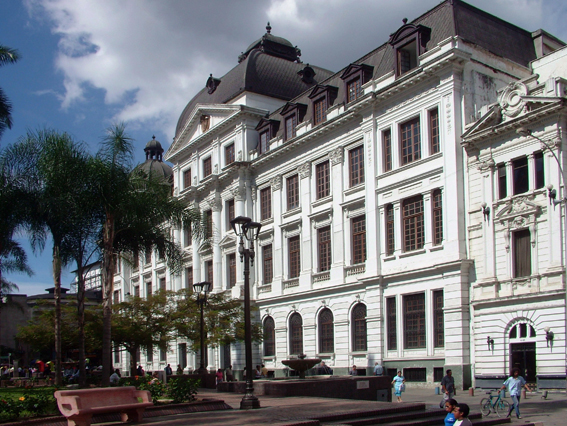
National Palace, Cali, Valle del Cauca, 1928–1933

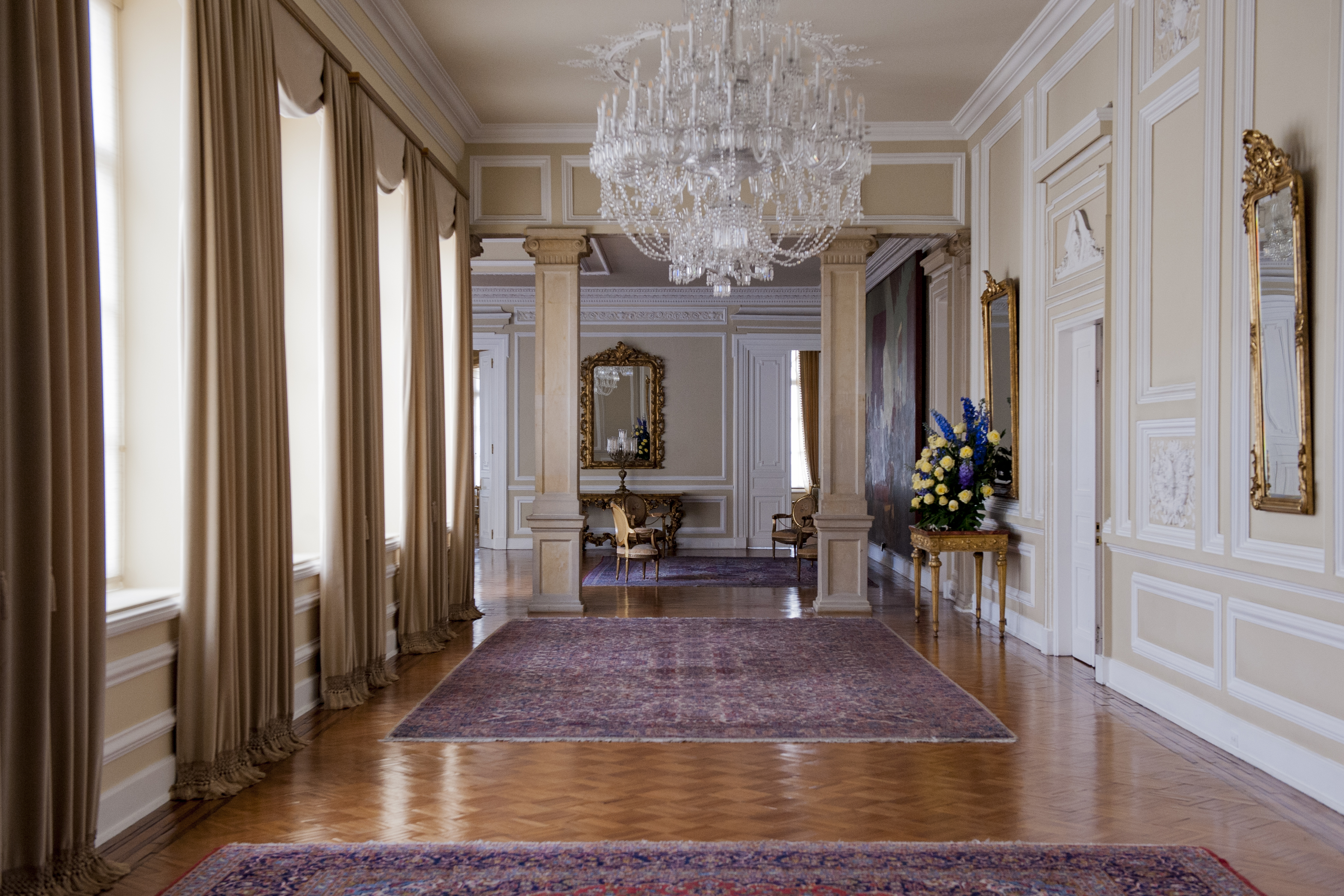
Interior of the presidential Palace of Nariño, La Candelaria, Bogotá, 1906–1908

==== Neoclassical churches and cathedrals ====
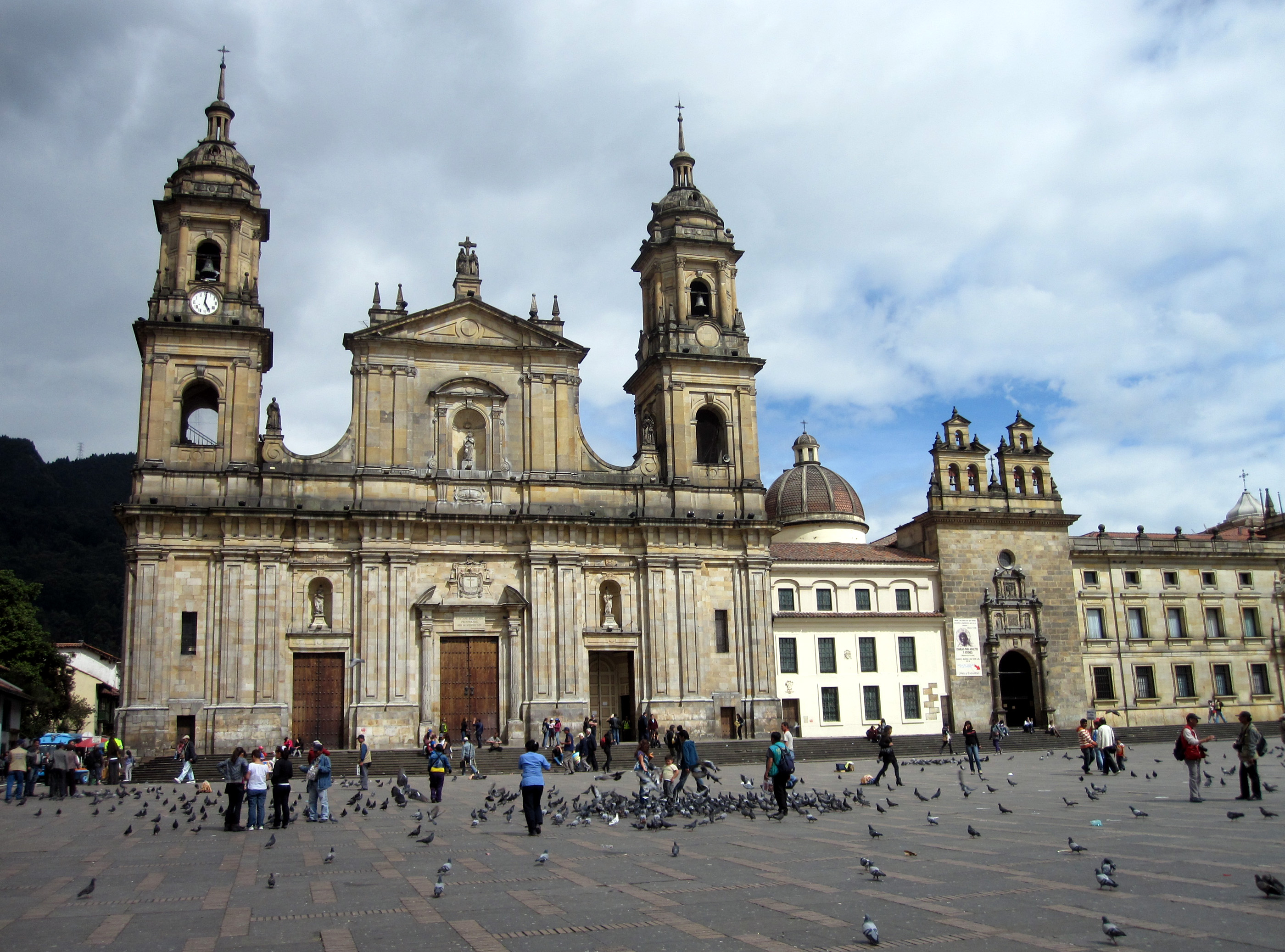
Bogotá Cathedral

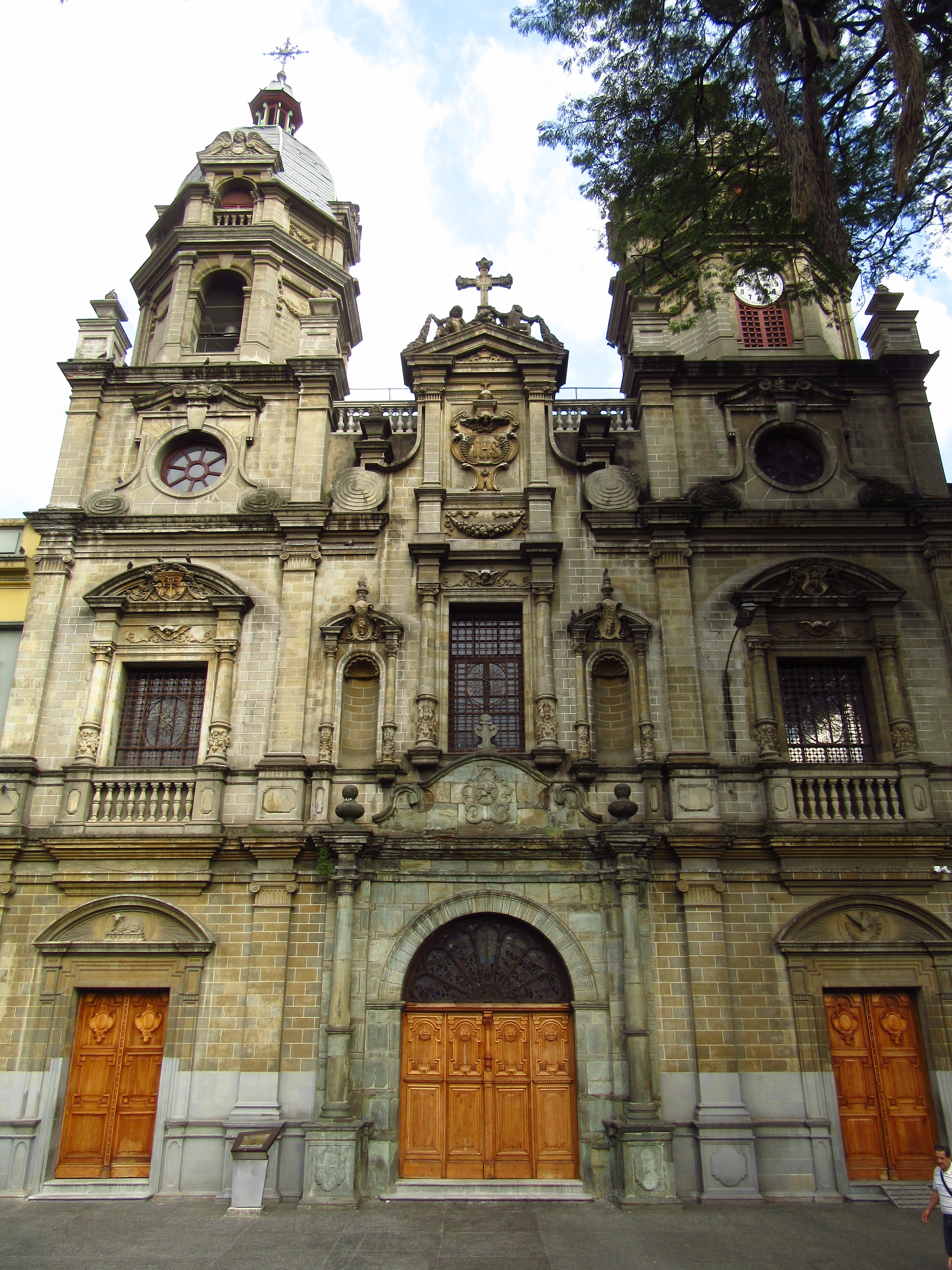
Iglesia de San Ignacio, Medellín

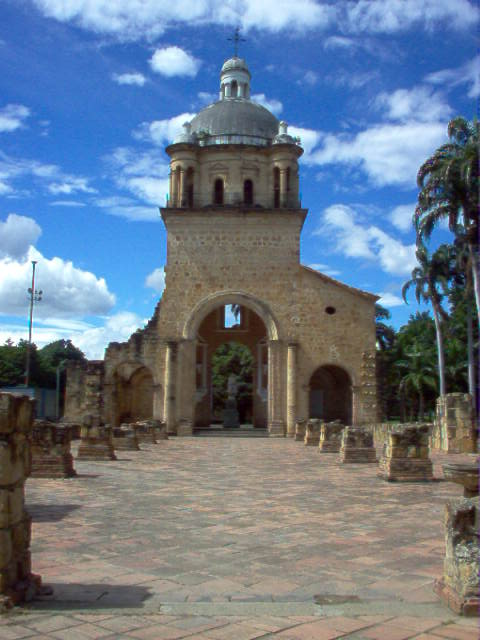
Historic Temple of Cúcuta, 1879-1897

==== Neoclassical educational and public buildings ====
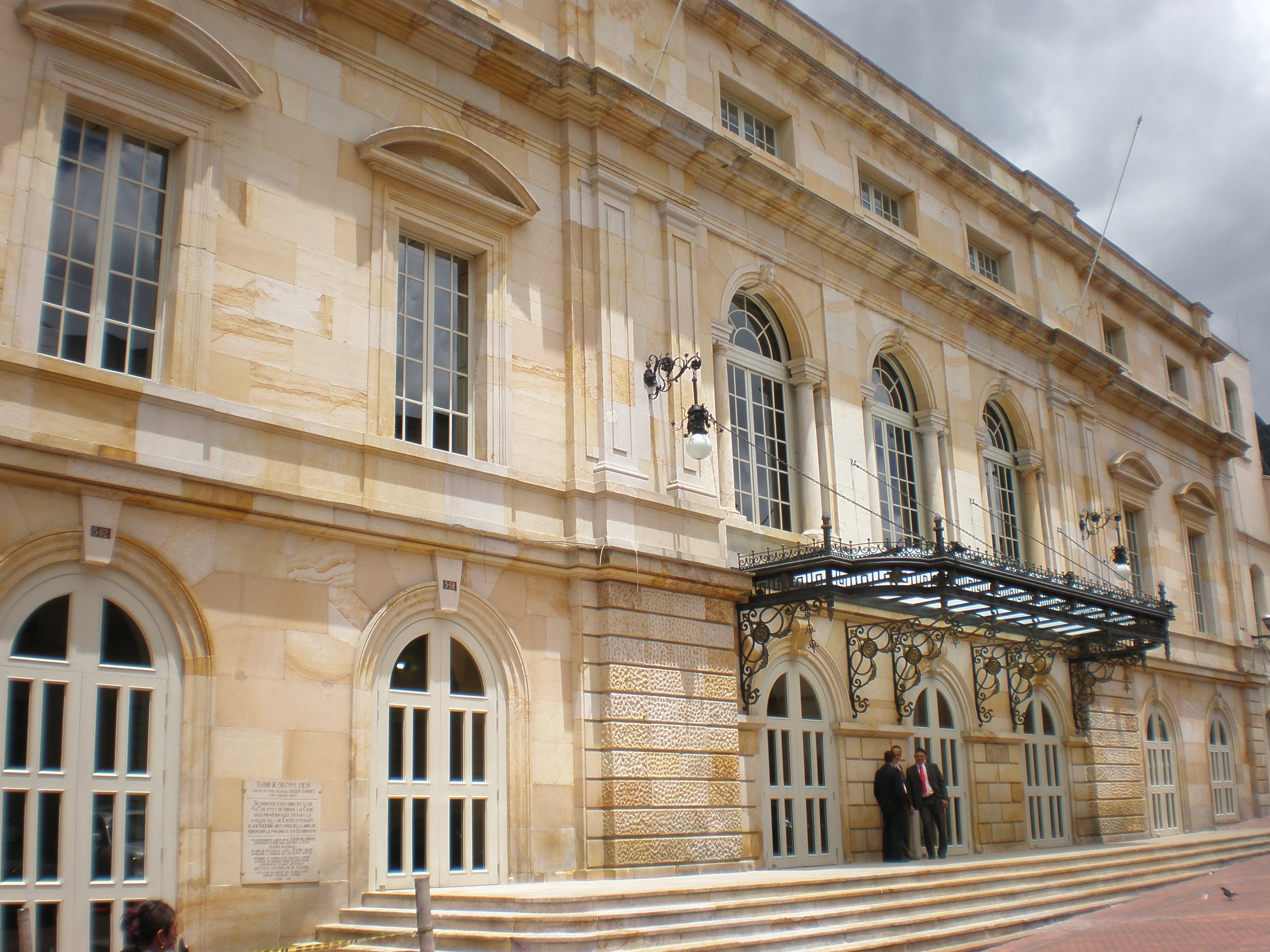
Teatro Colón, Bogotá

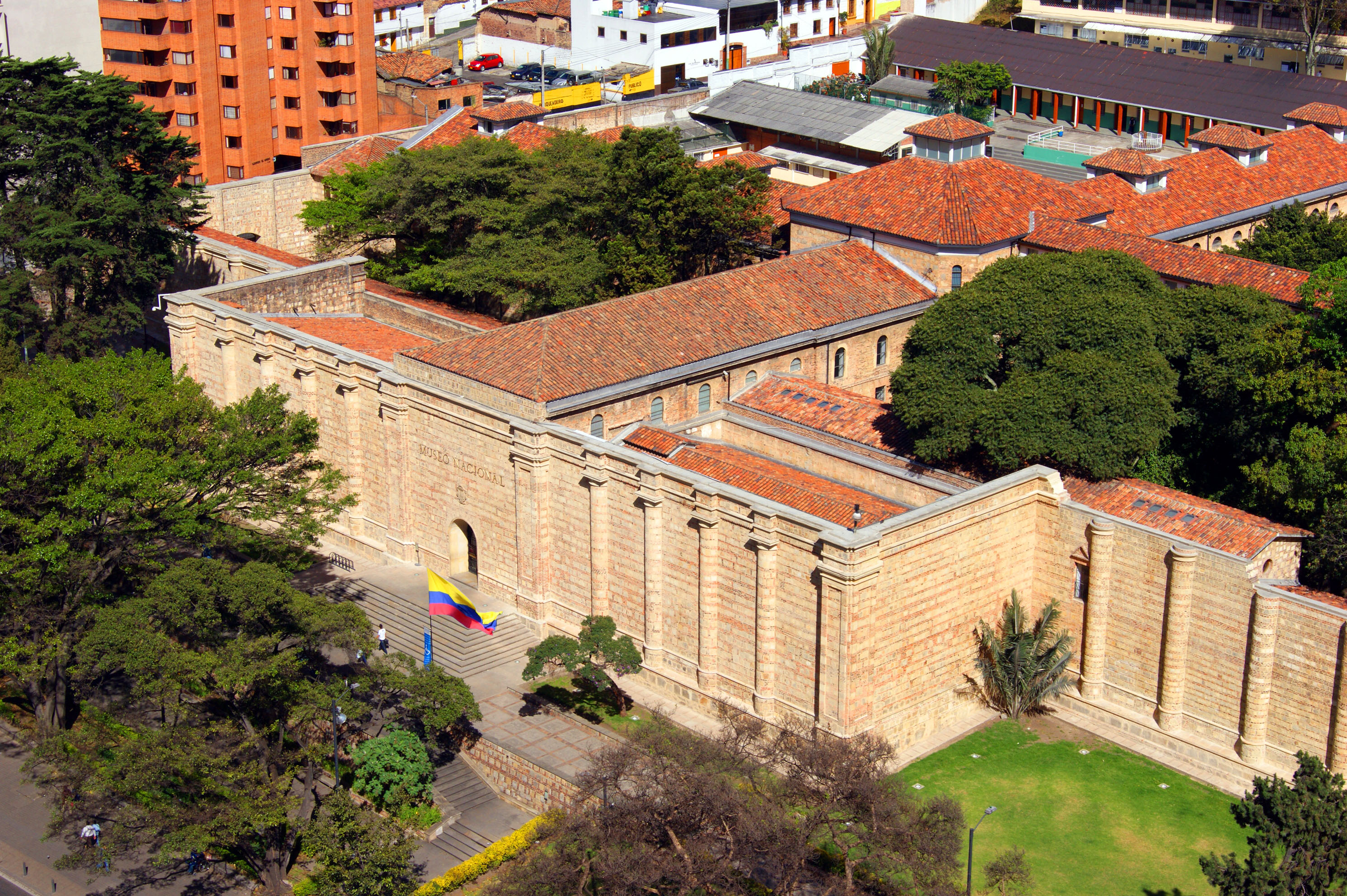
National Museum

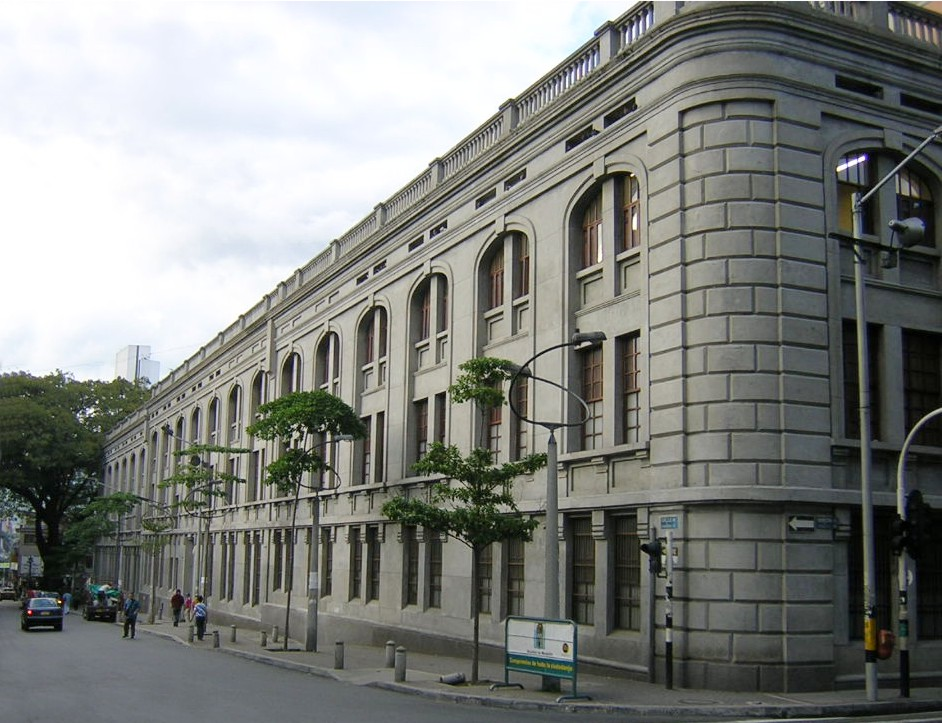
Claustro de San Ignacio, Medellín

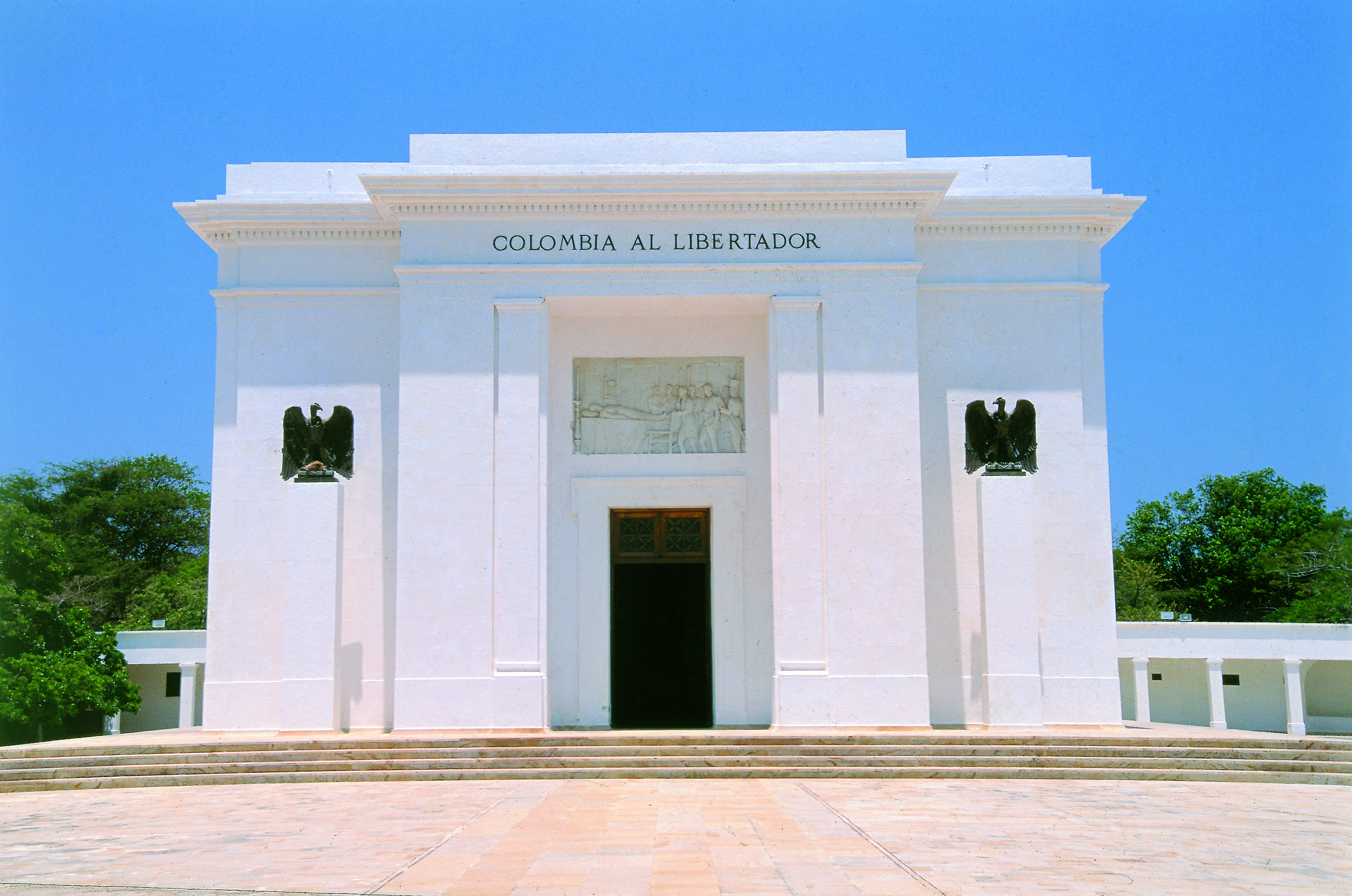
Quinta de San Pedro Alejandrino

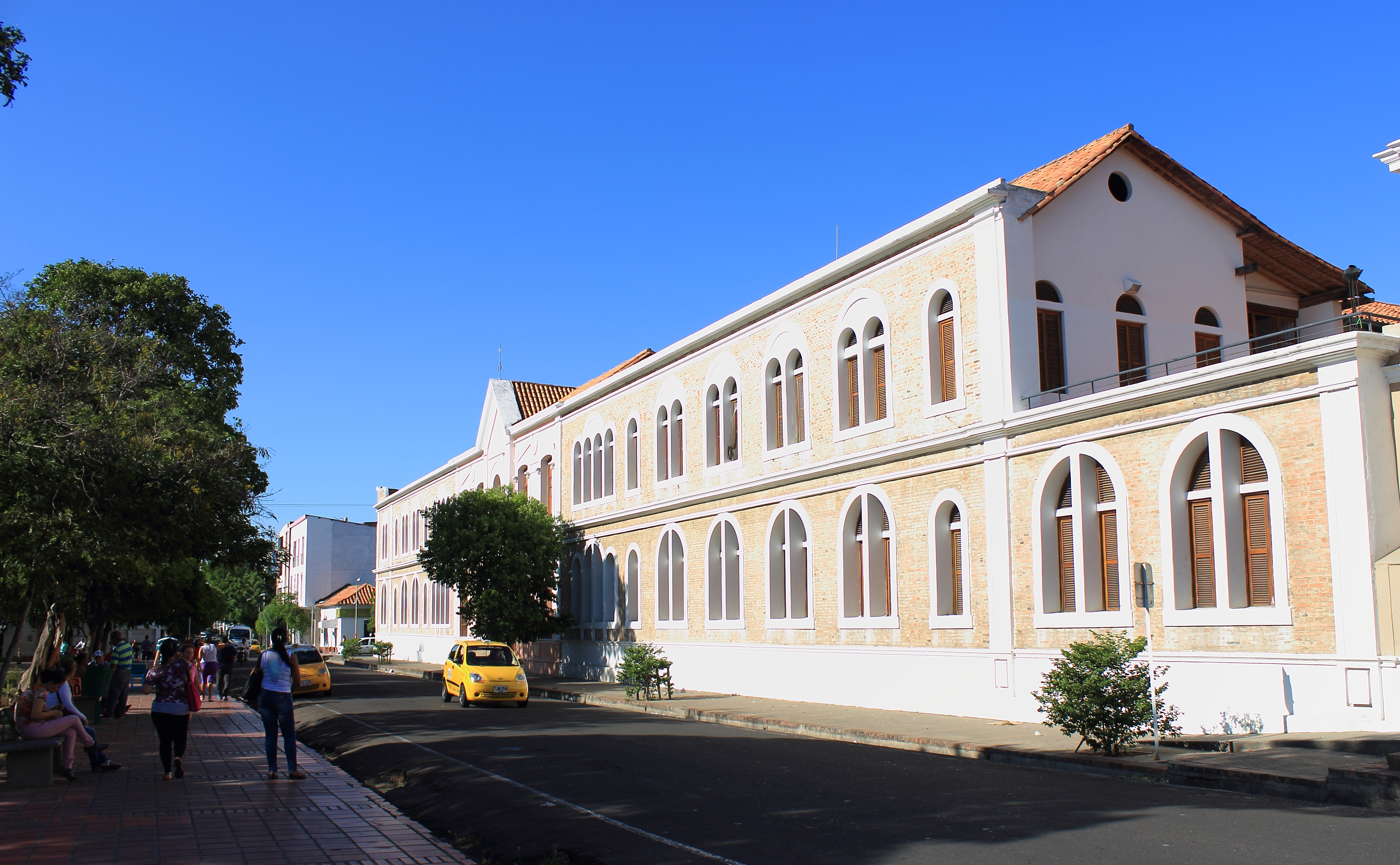
Julio Pérez Ferrero Public Library, Cúcuta

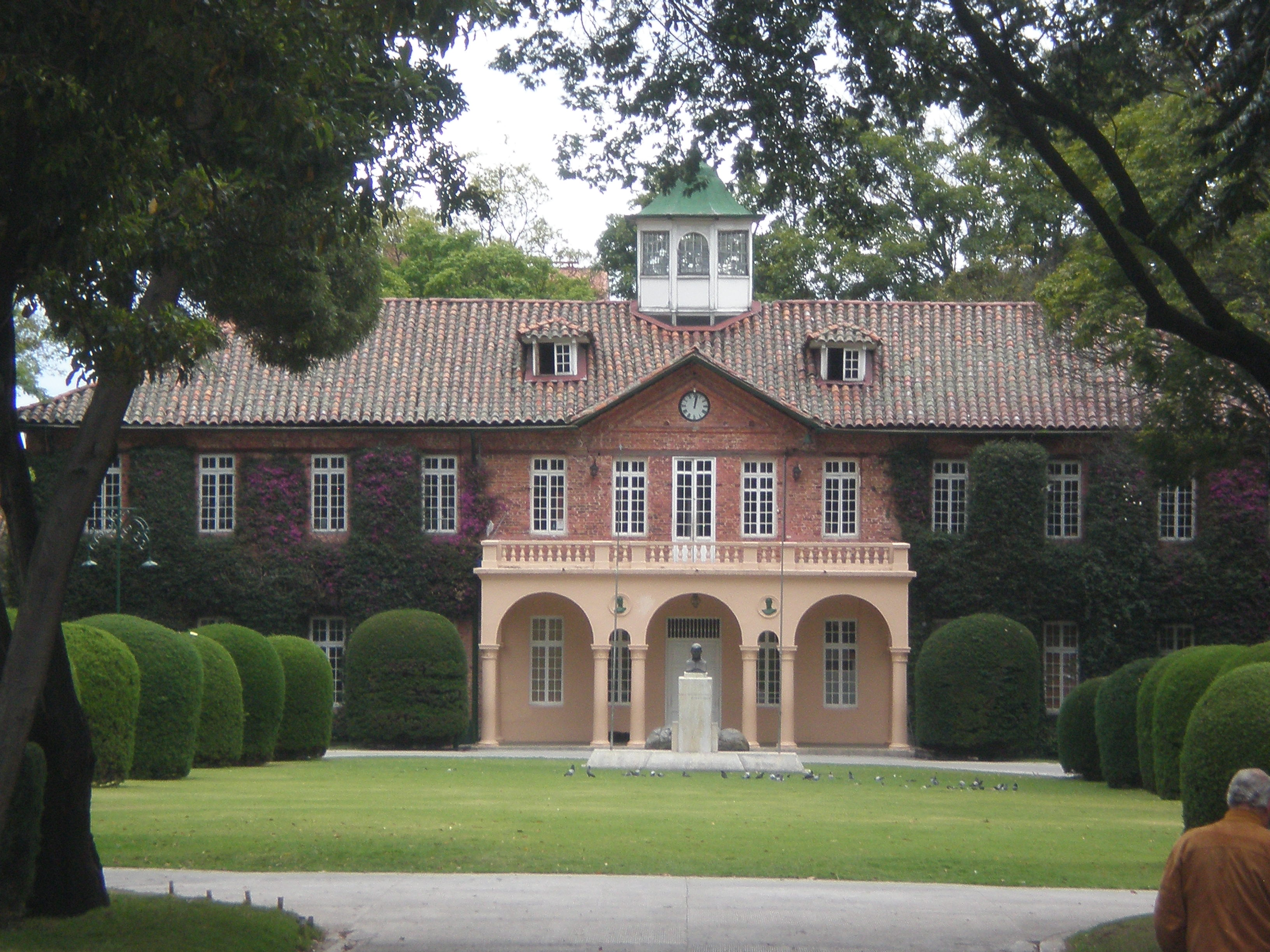
Main building of the Gimnasio Moderno School, Bogotá

==== Gothic Revival ====
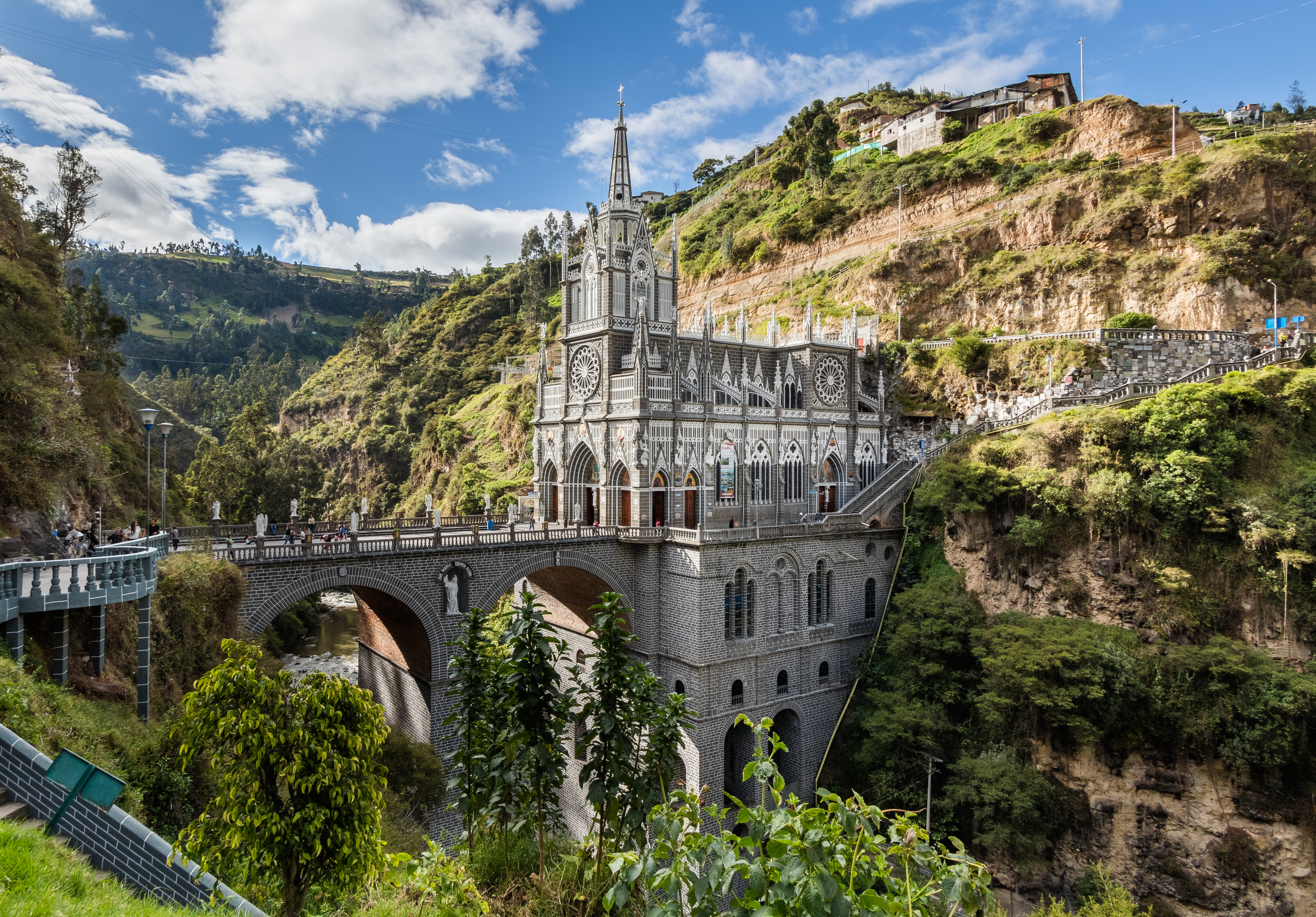
Church of Las Lajas

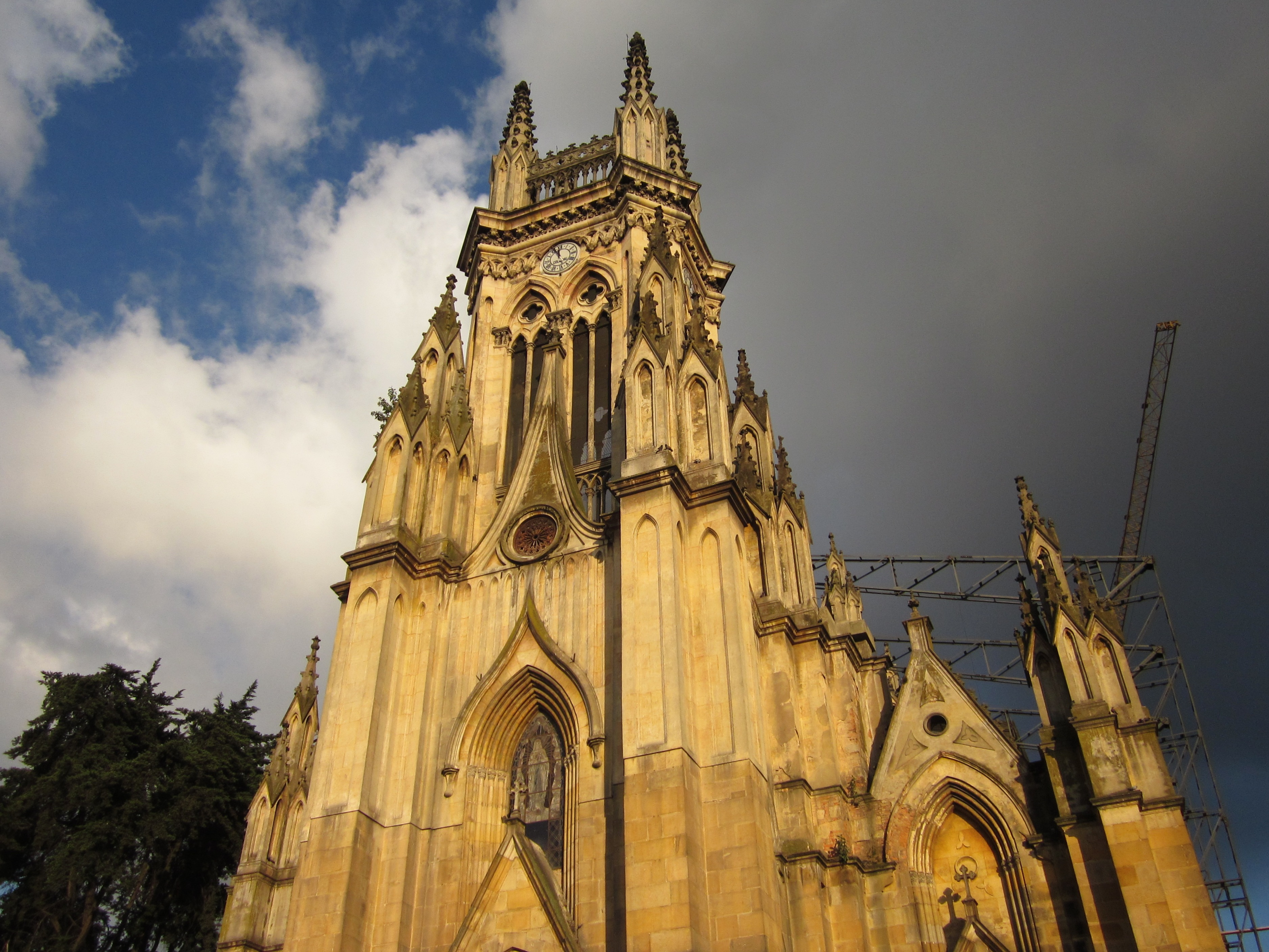
Iglesia de Lourdes, Bogotá

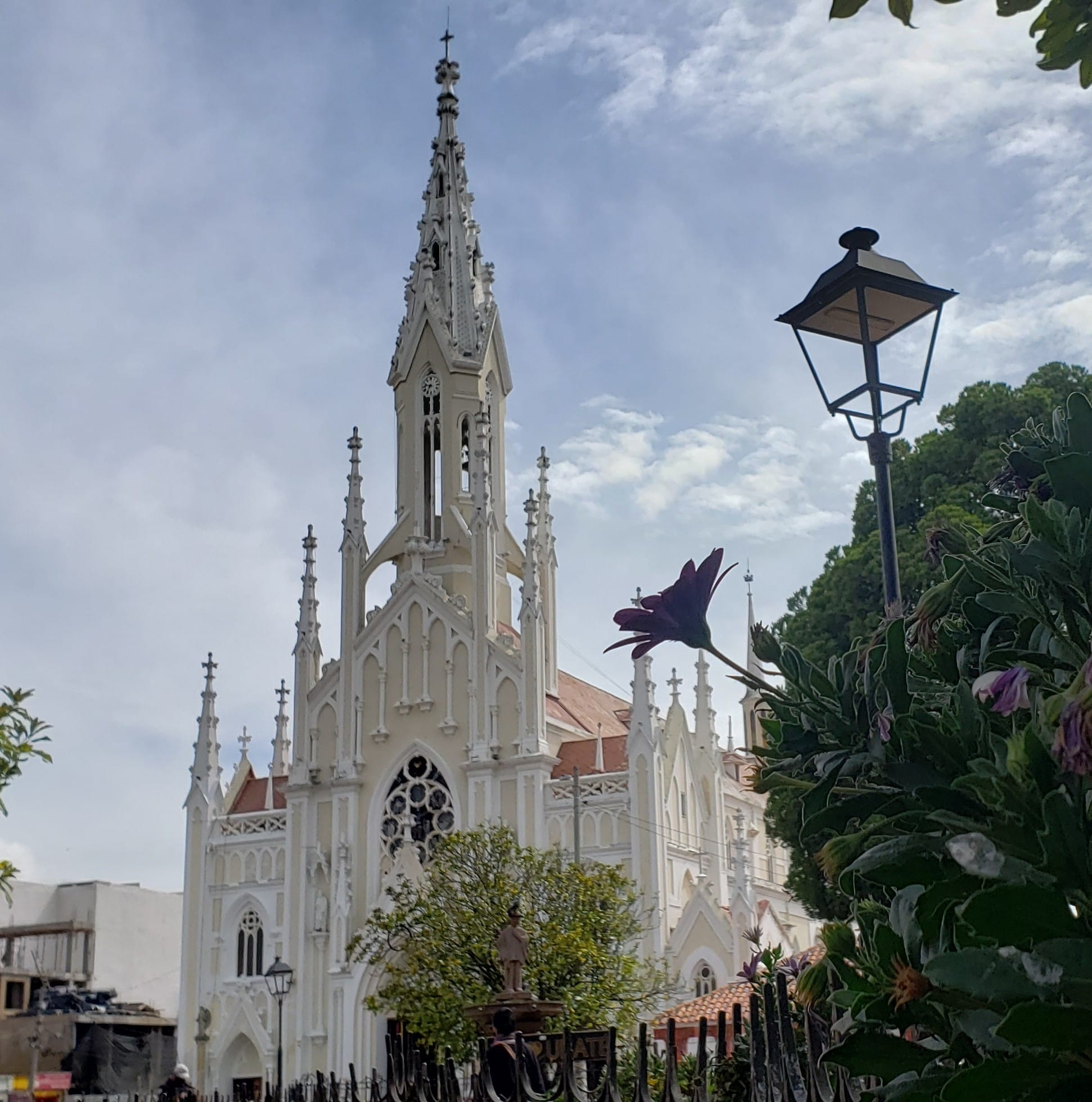
Church of Ubaté, Cundinamarca

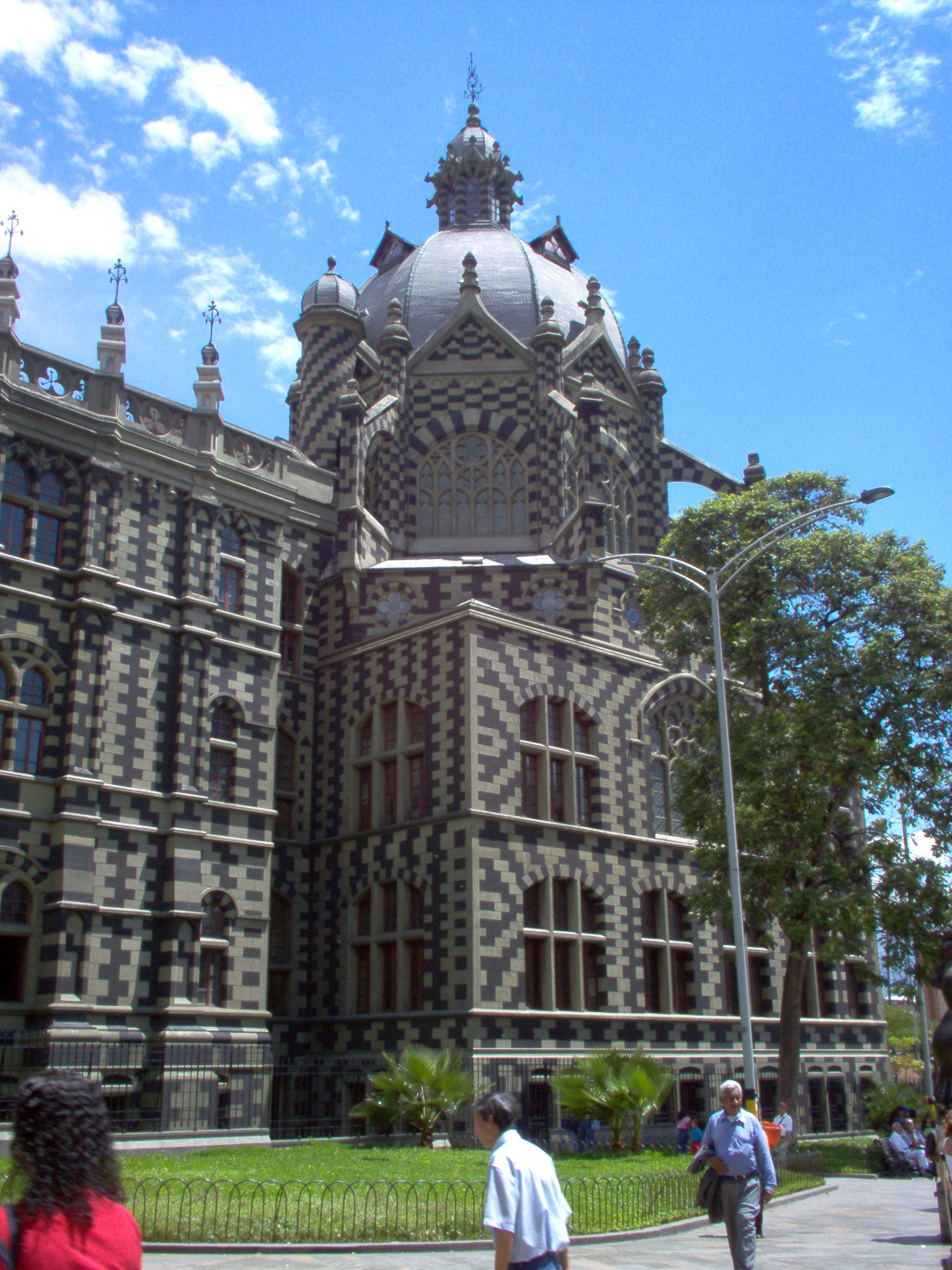
Palace of Culture, Medellín

==== Romanesque Revival ====
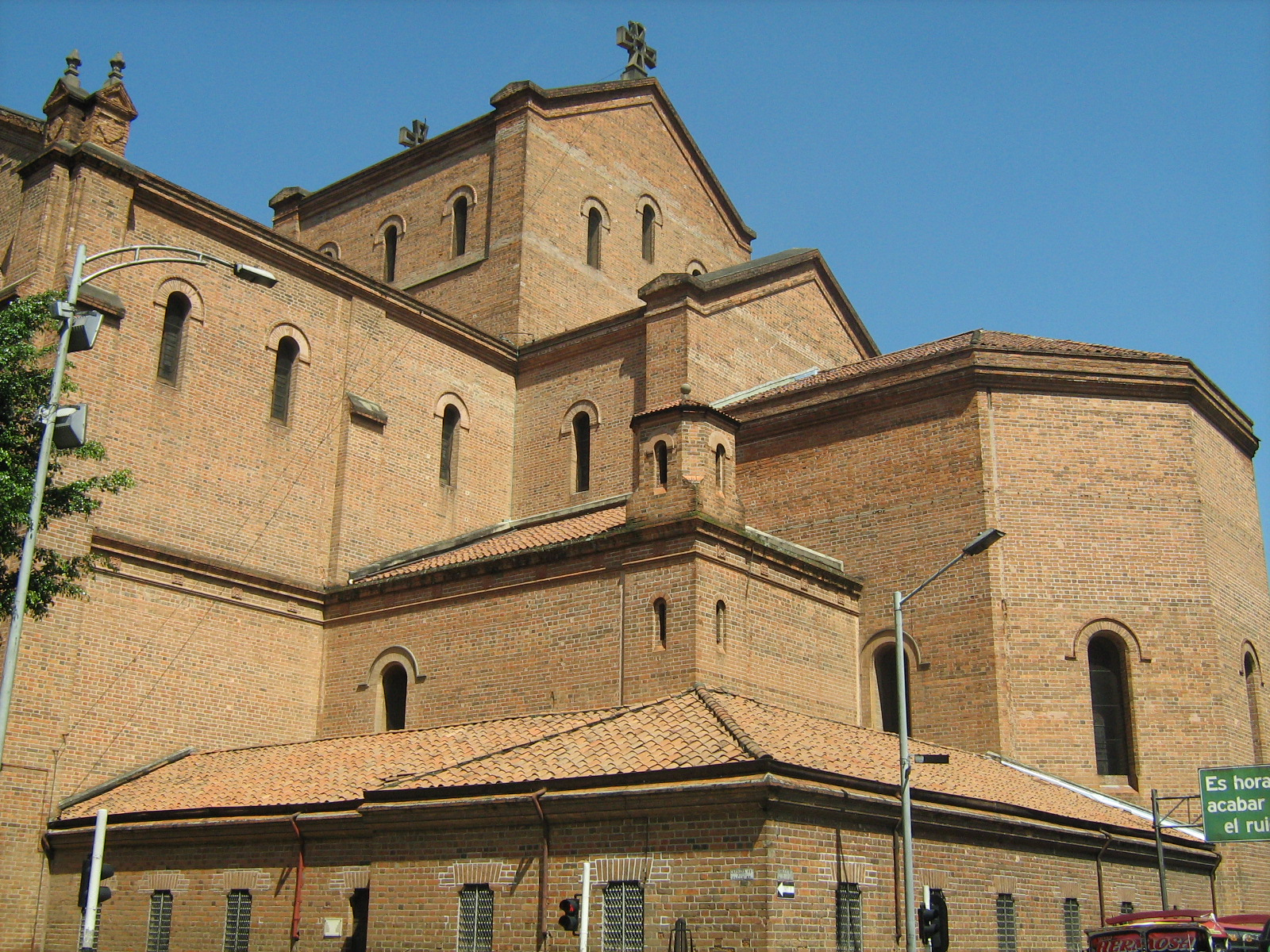
Medellín Cathedral

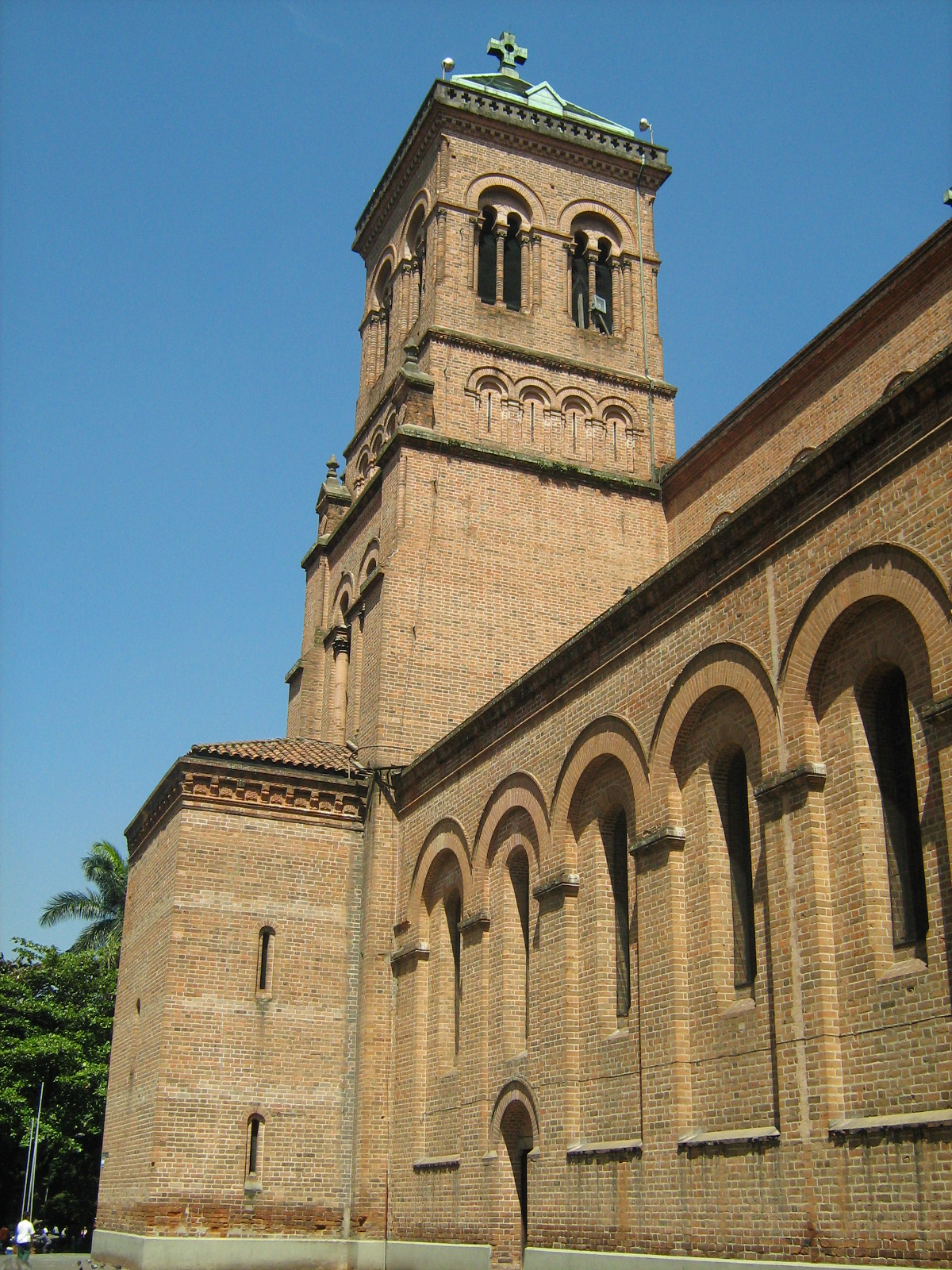
Medellín Cathedral

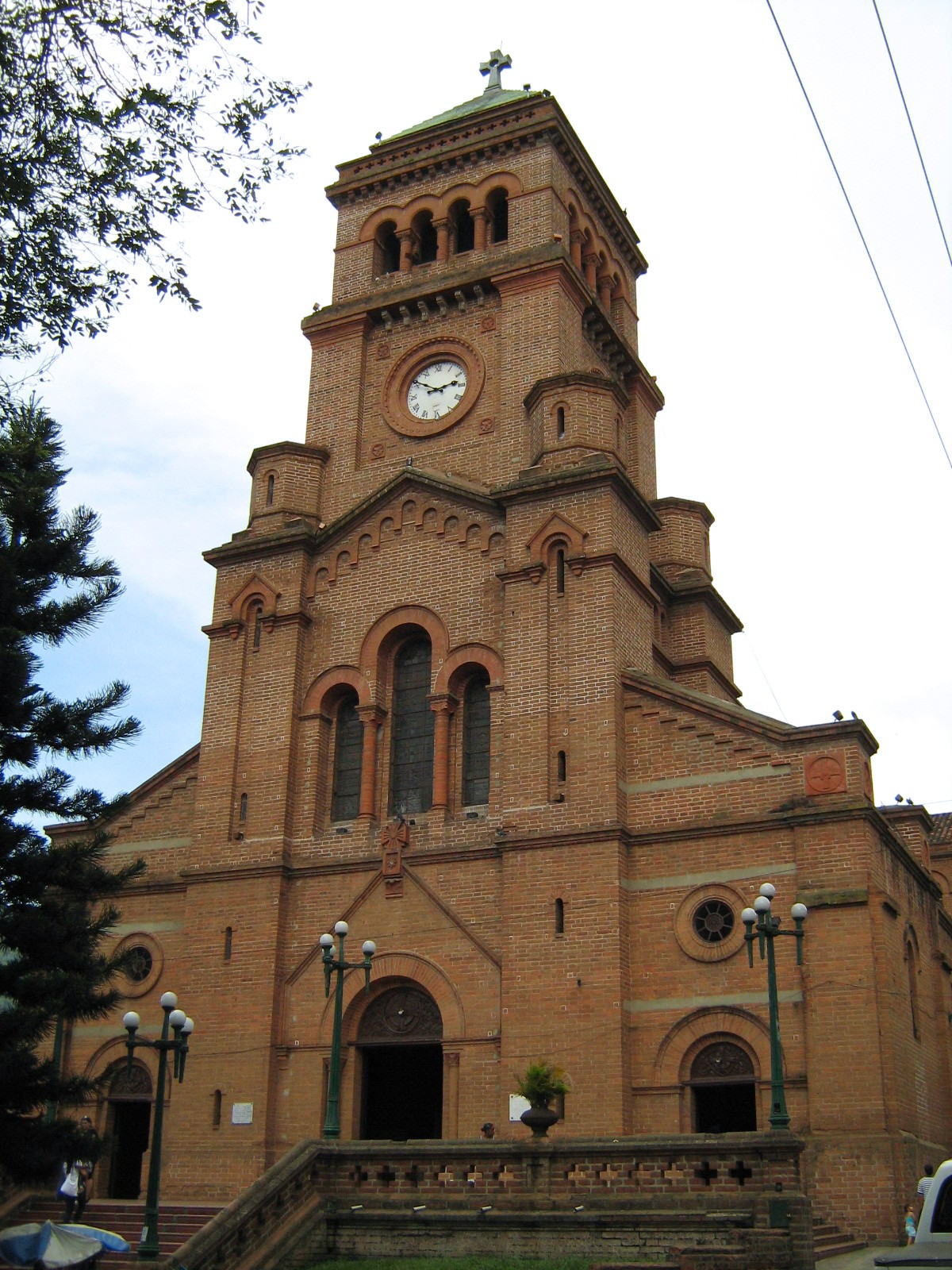
Girardota Cathedral

== Modern architecture (c. 1920-1970) ==
=== High-rise buildings ===
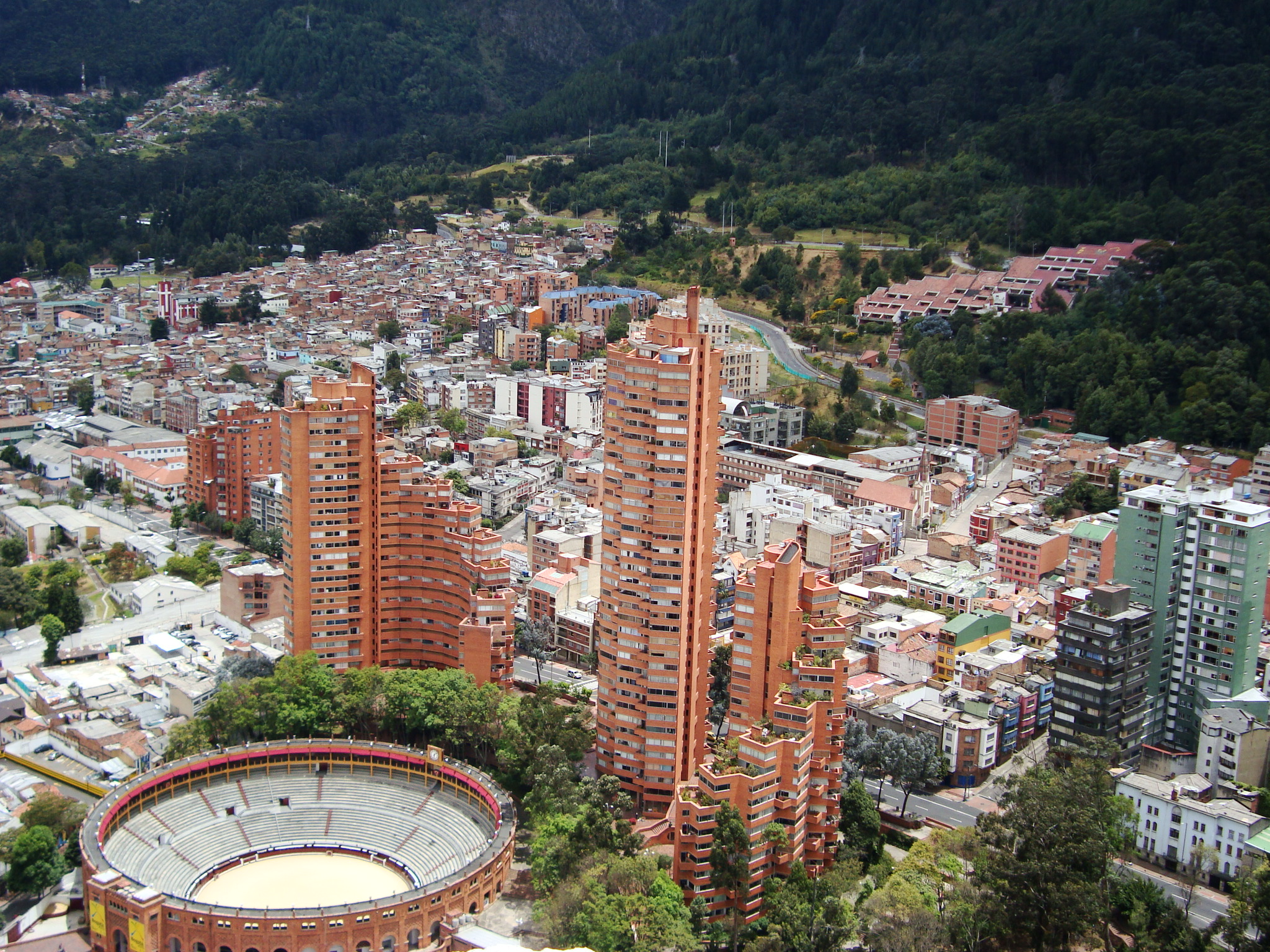
Torres del Parque, Santa Fe, Bogotá, 1965–1970

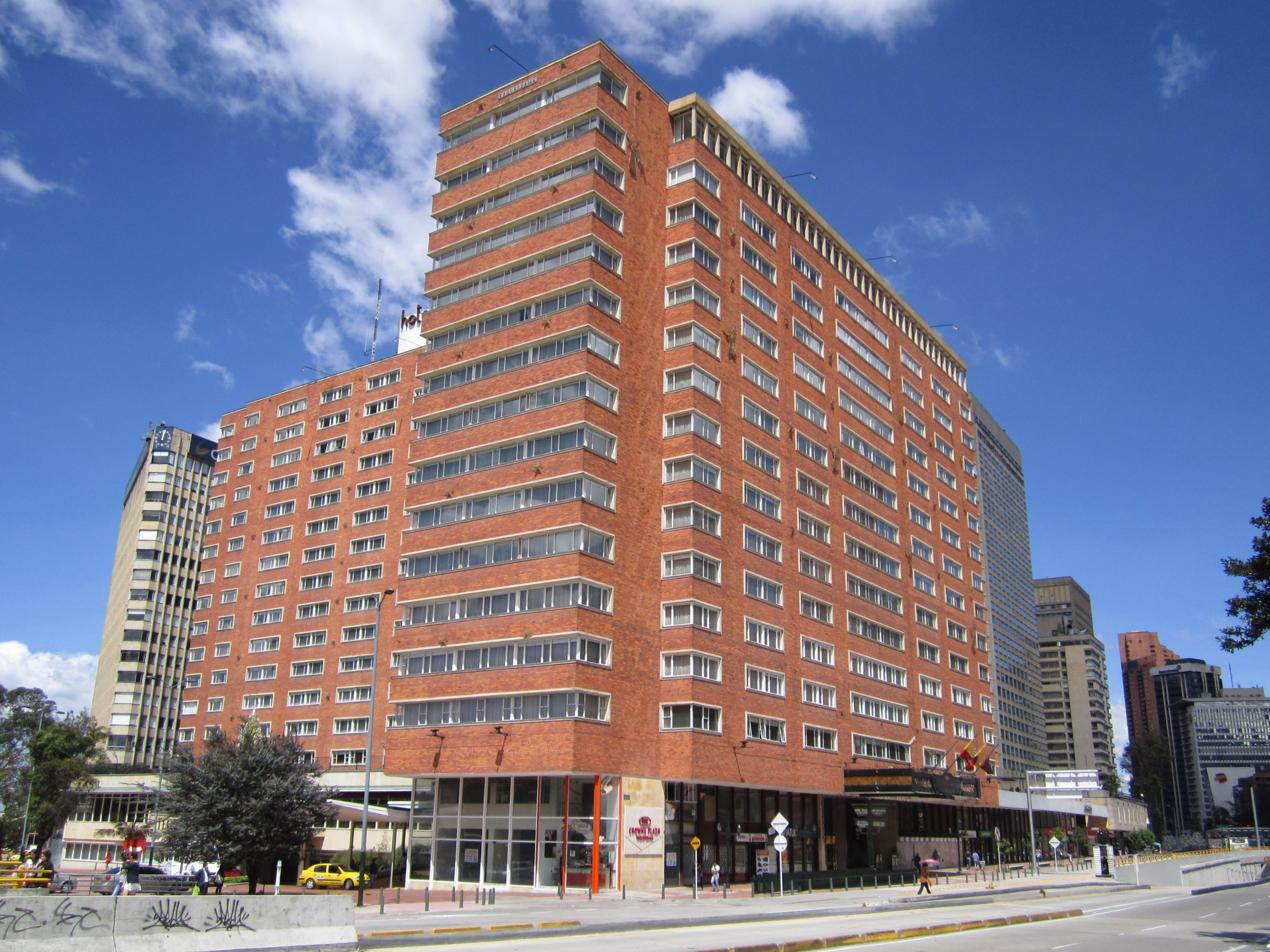
Hotel Tequendama, Santa Fe, Bogotá, 1953–1970

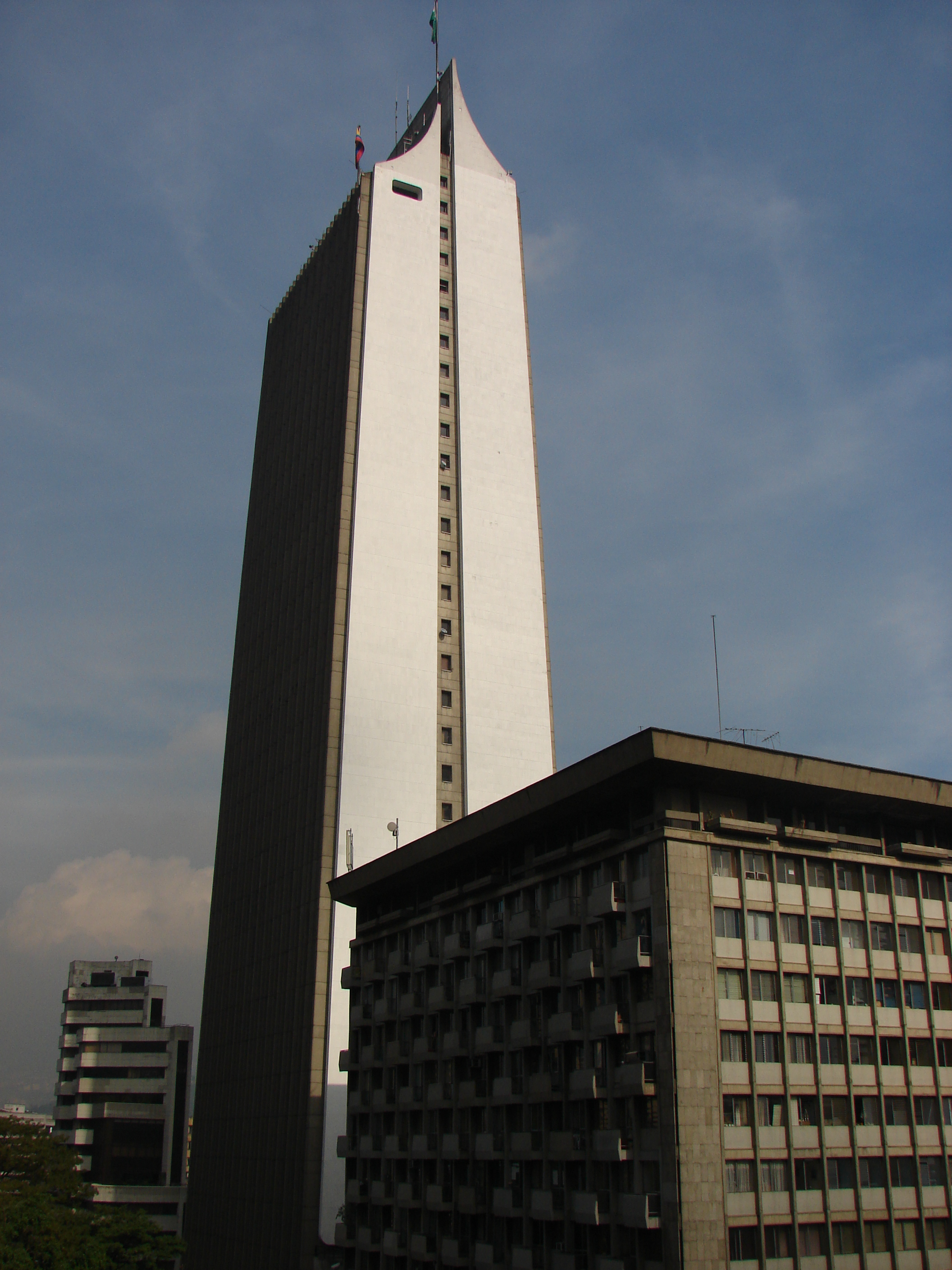
Torre Coltejer, Medellín

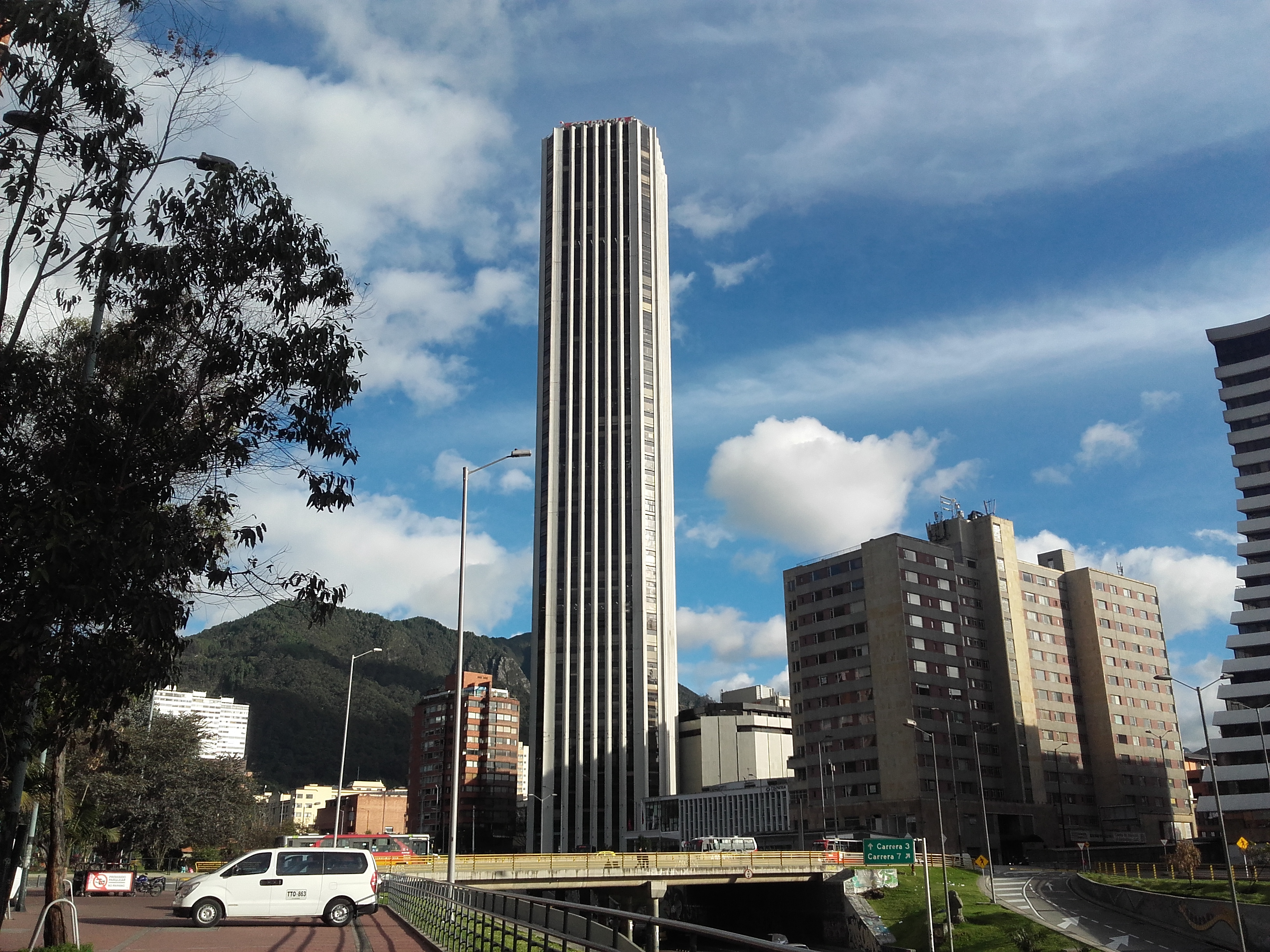
Torre Colpatria, Bogotá

=== Universities, schools and libraries ===
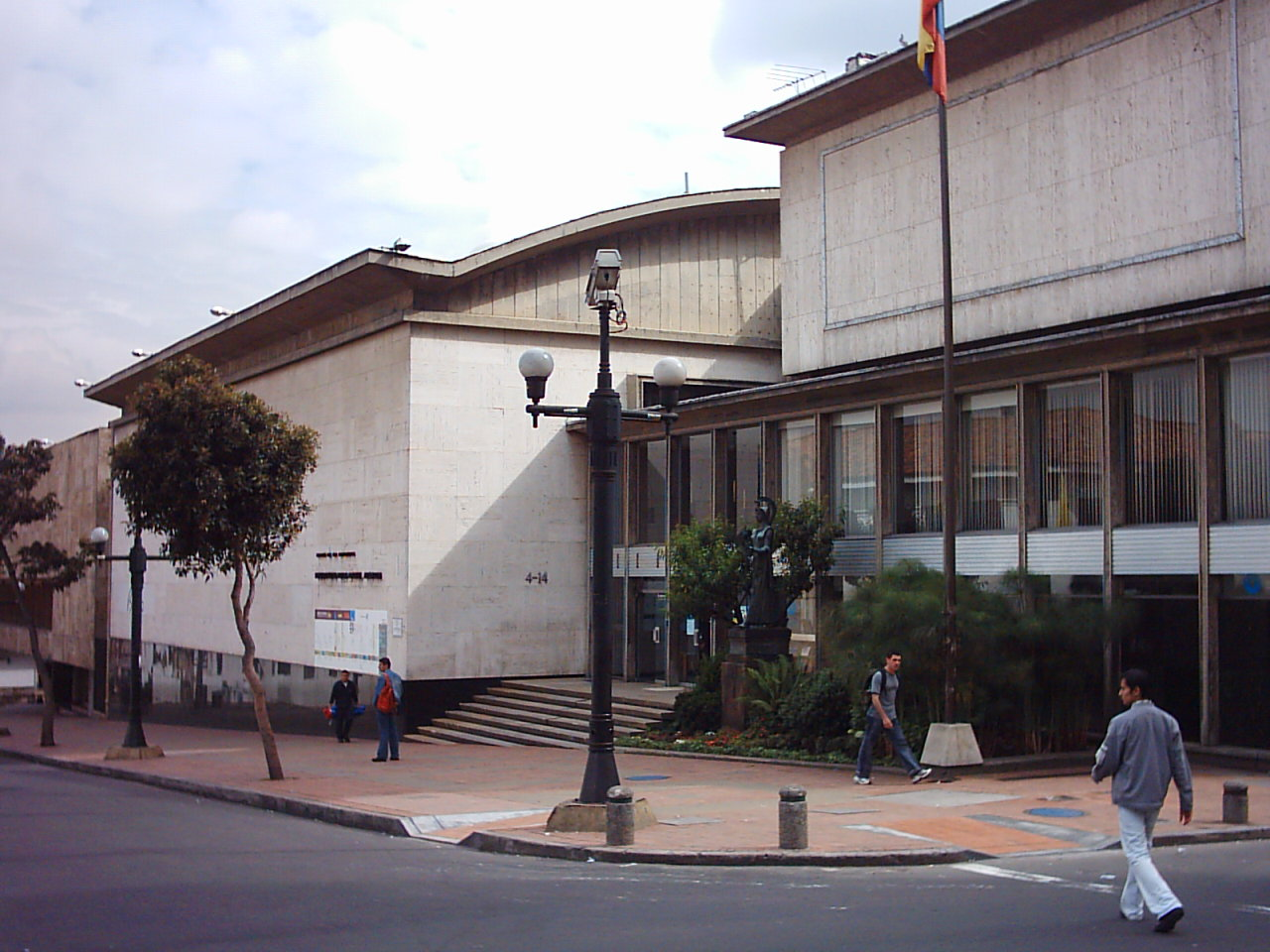
Luís Ángel Arango Library, La Candelaria, Bogotá, 1955–1958

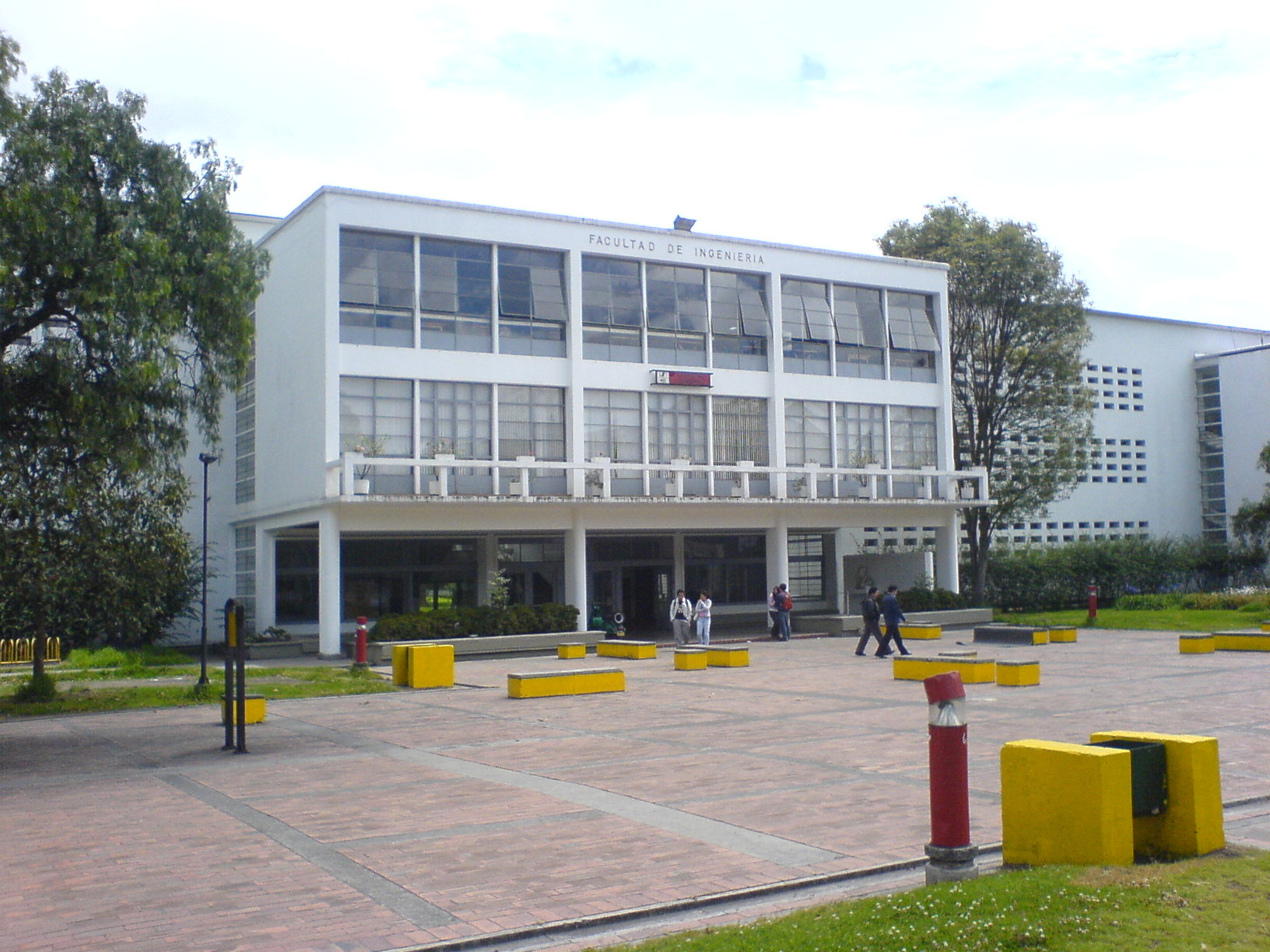
Faculty of Engineering at the National University of Colombia, Teusaquillo, Bogotá, 1940–1945

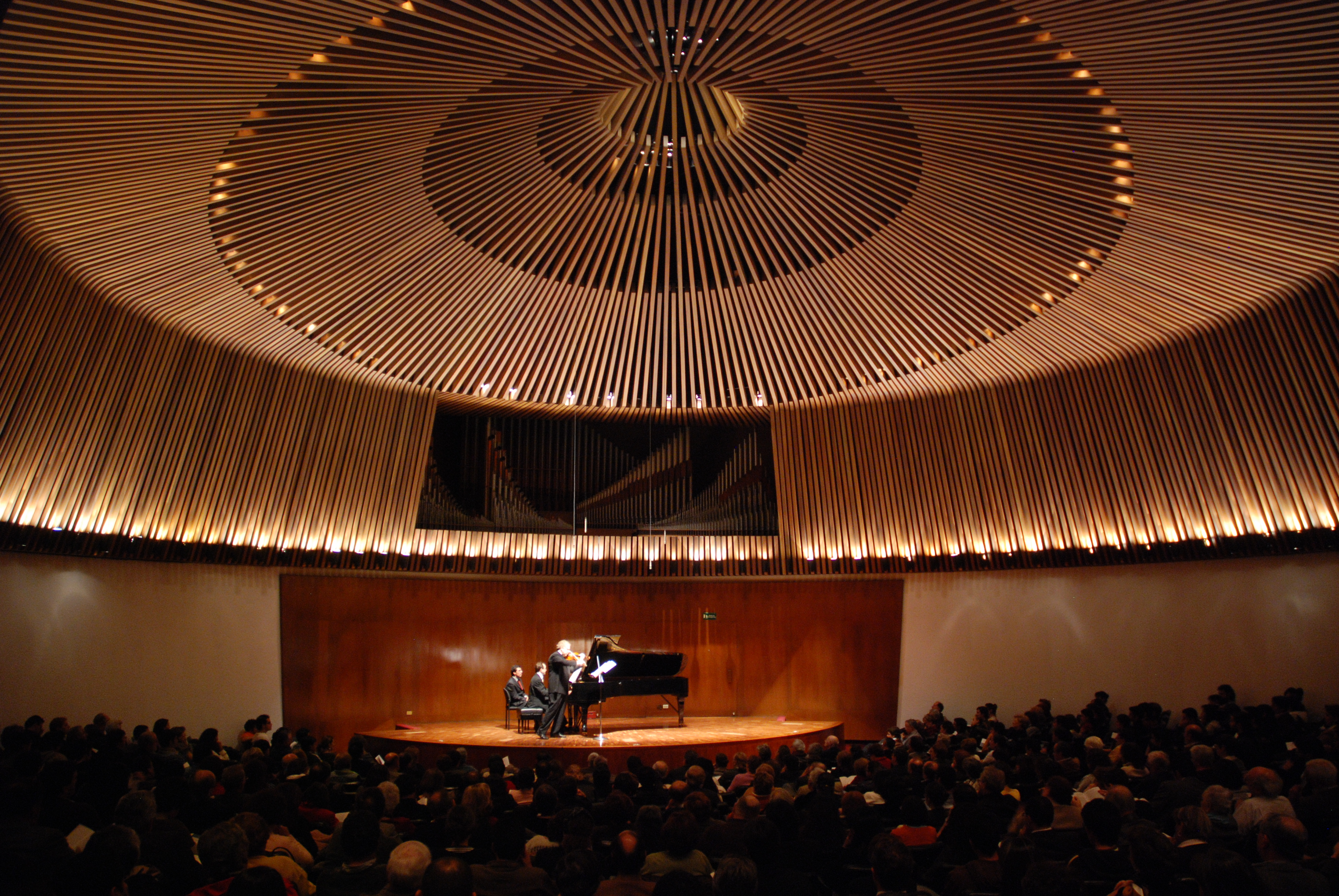
Concert Hall of the Luís Ángel Arango Library, Bogotá

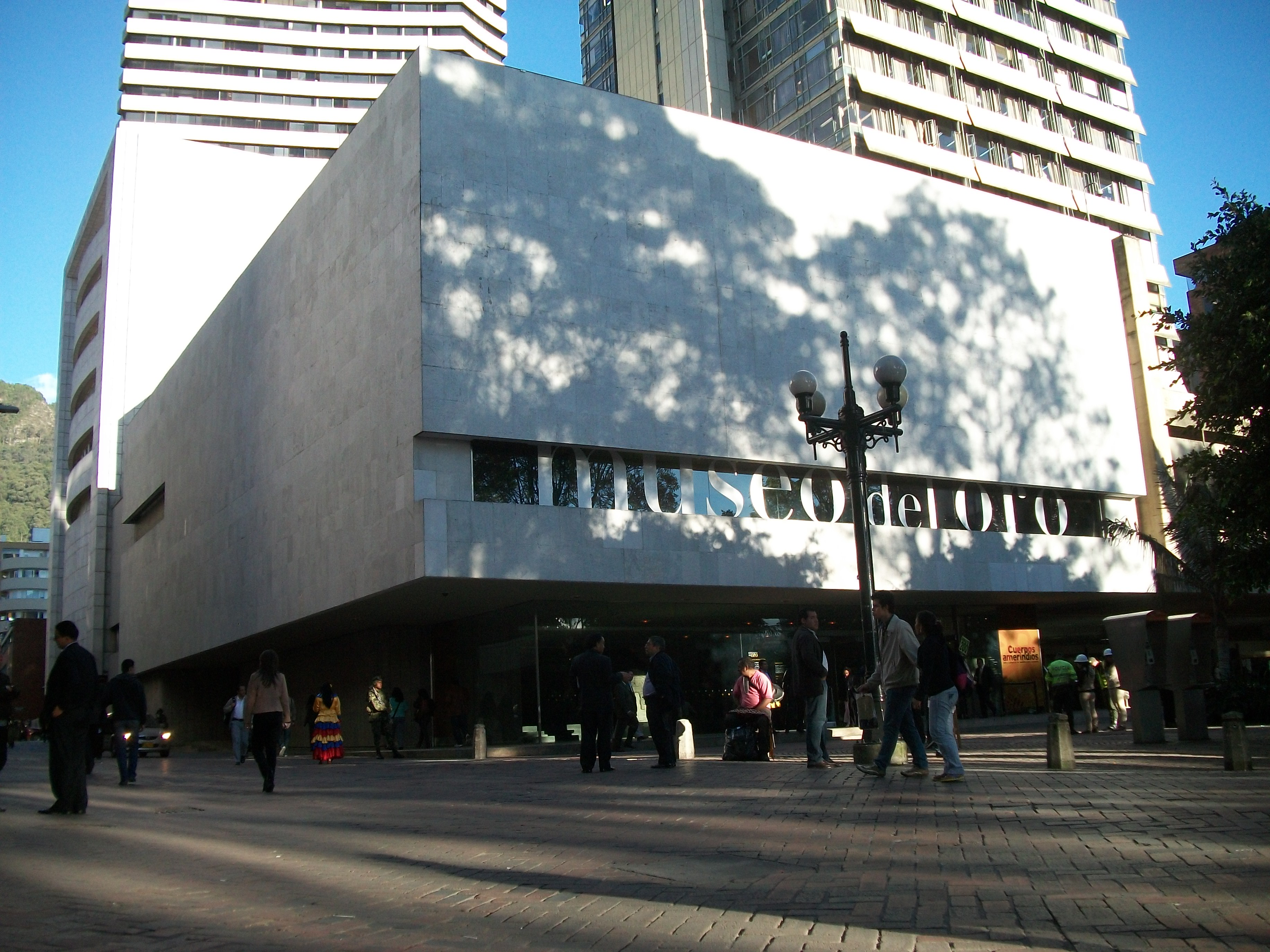
Museo del Oro, Bogotá

=== Churches and cathedral ===
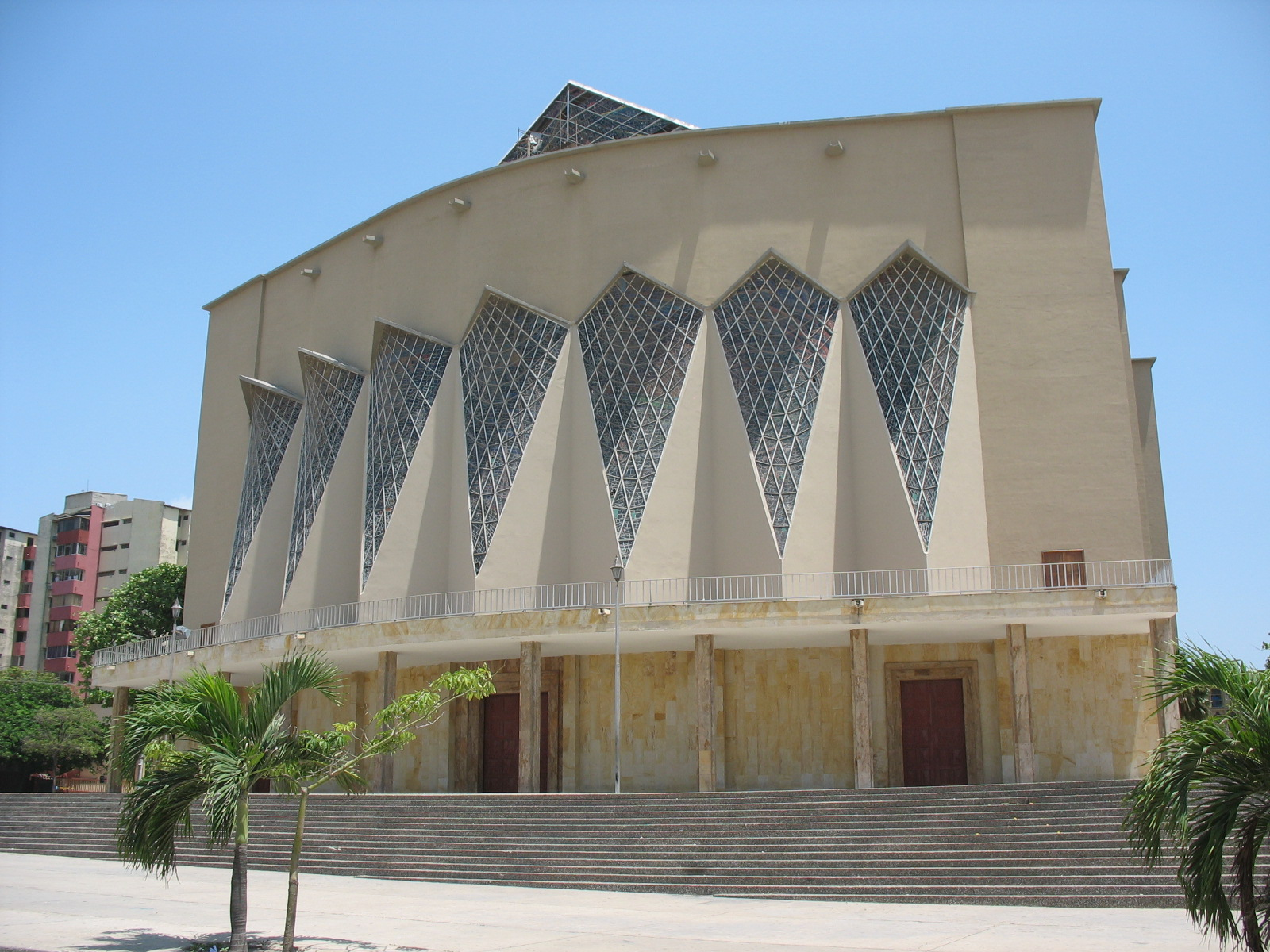
Barranquilla Cathedral

=== Art Deco Architecture ===
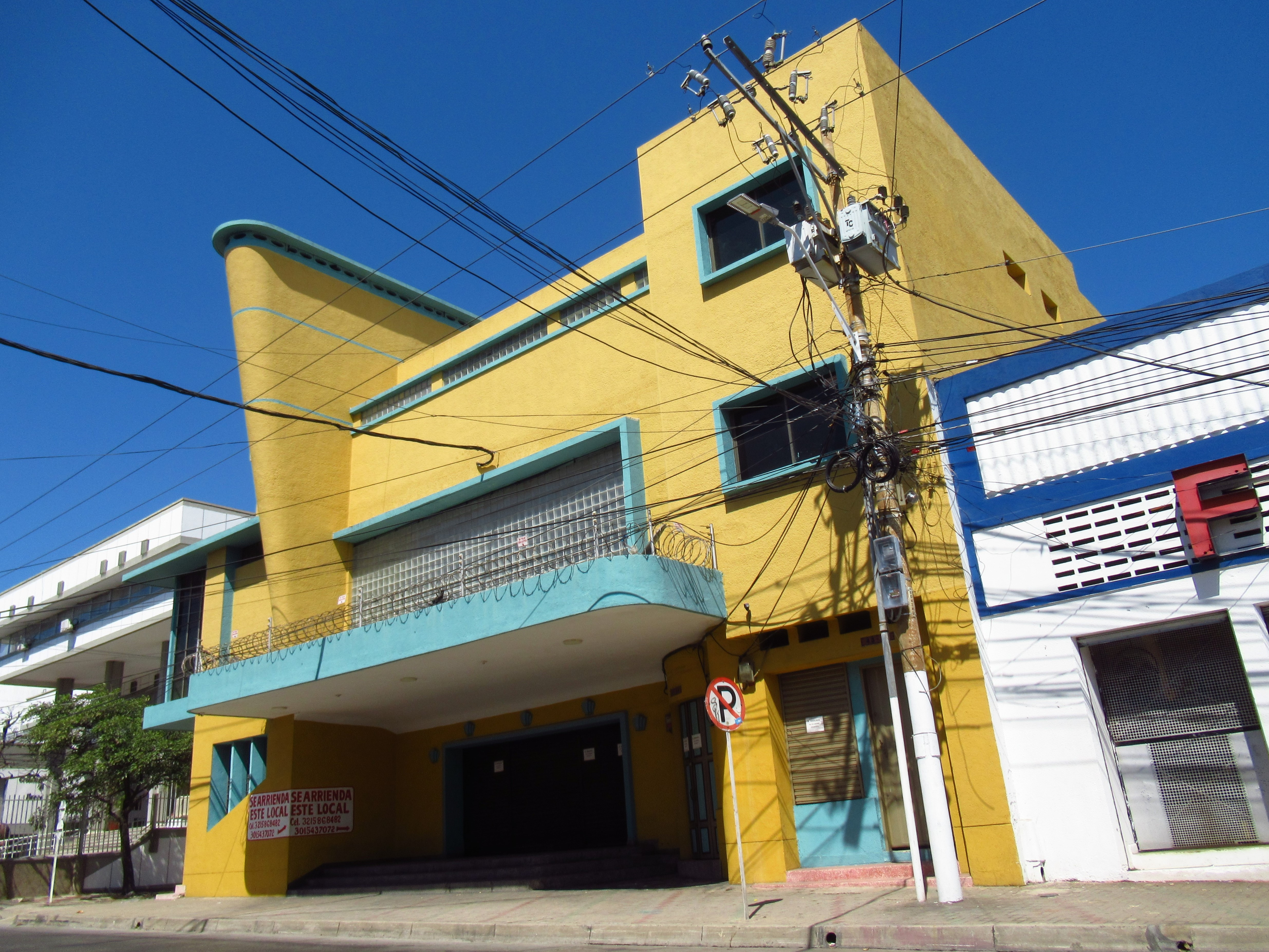
Teatro Colón, Barranquilla

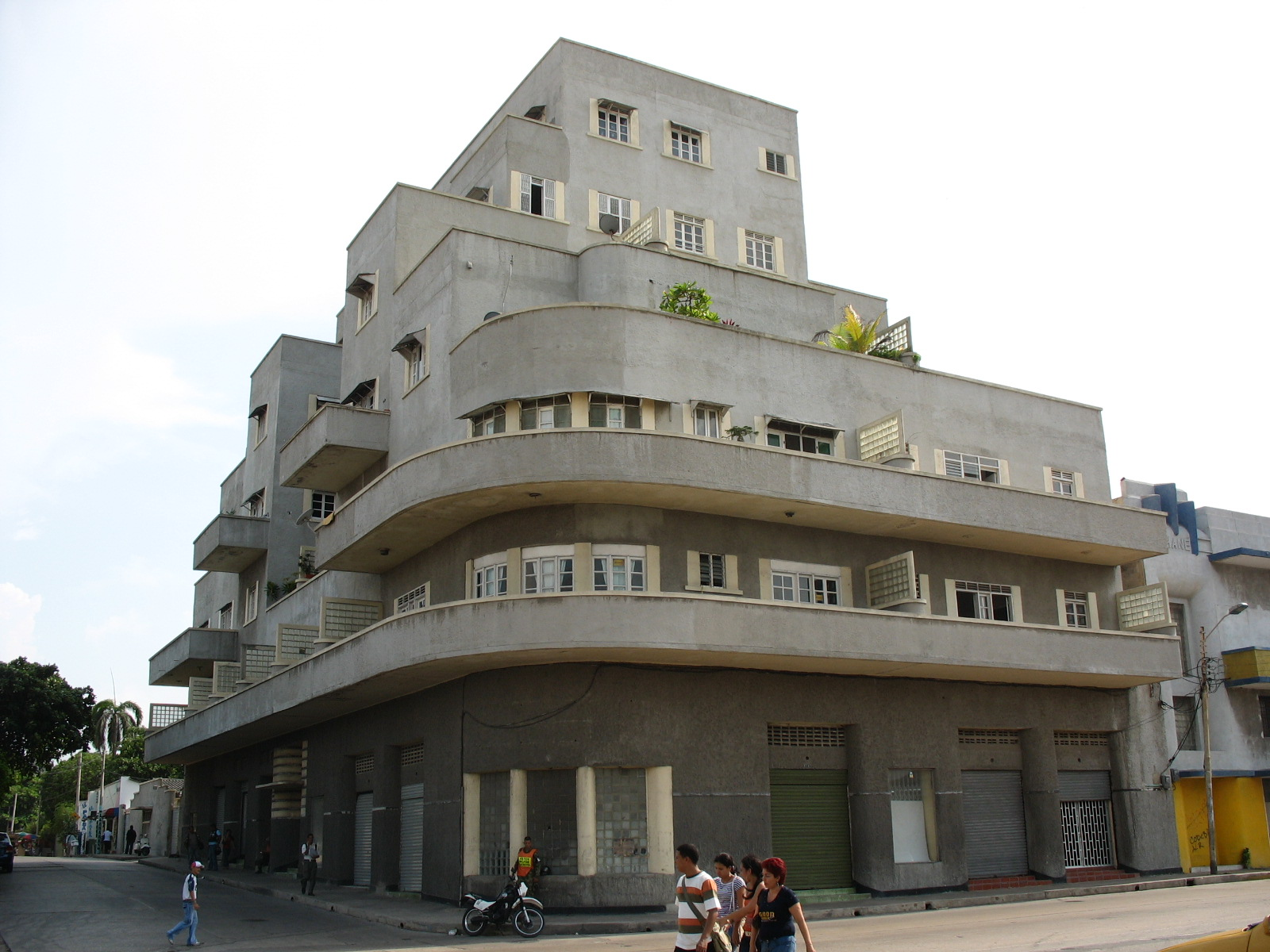
Edificio García, Barranquilla

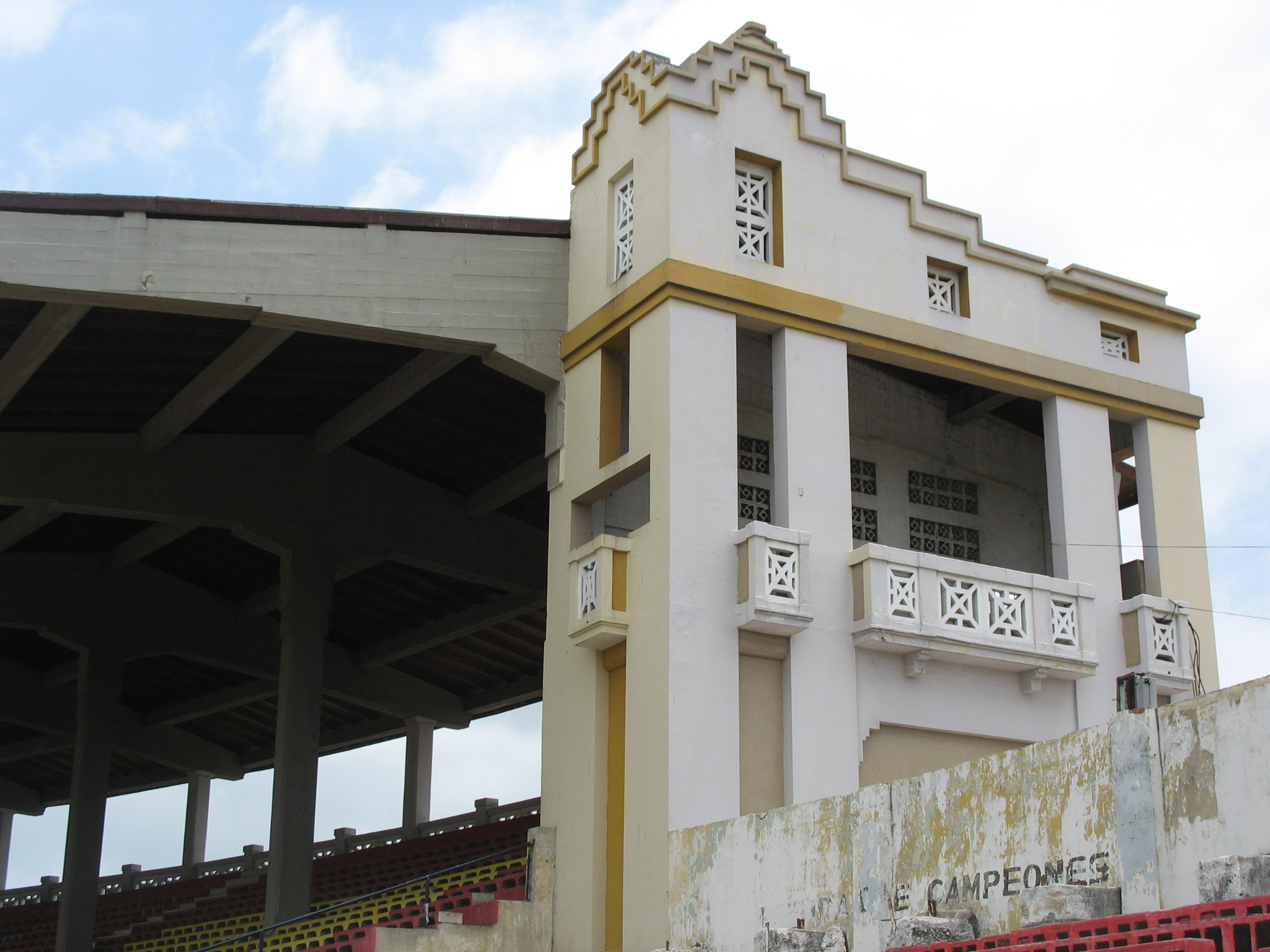
Romelio Martínez Stadium, Barranquilla

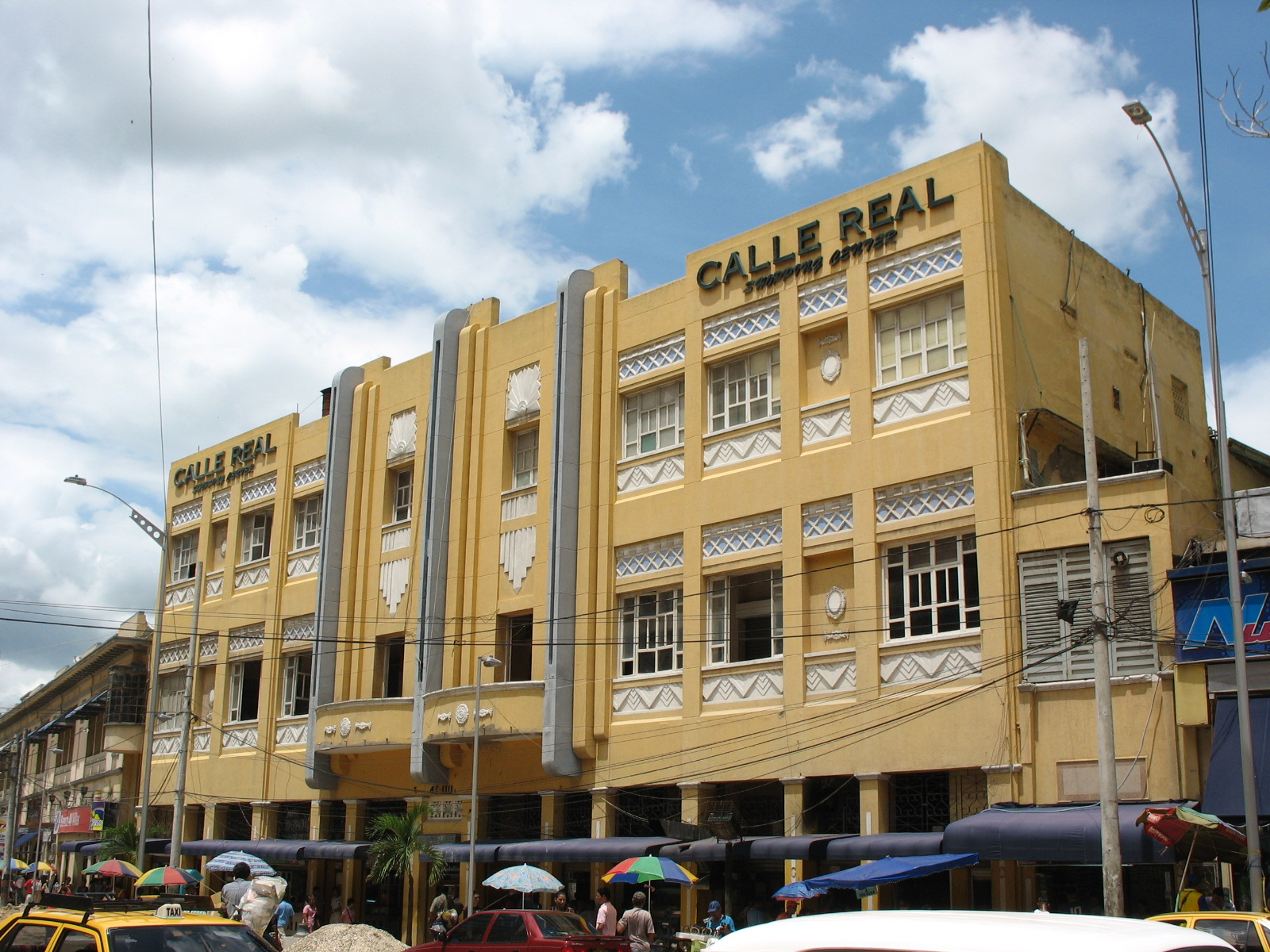
Calle Real Shopping Mall, Barranquilla

== Contemporary architecture (c. 1970-present) ==
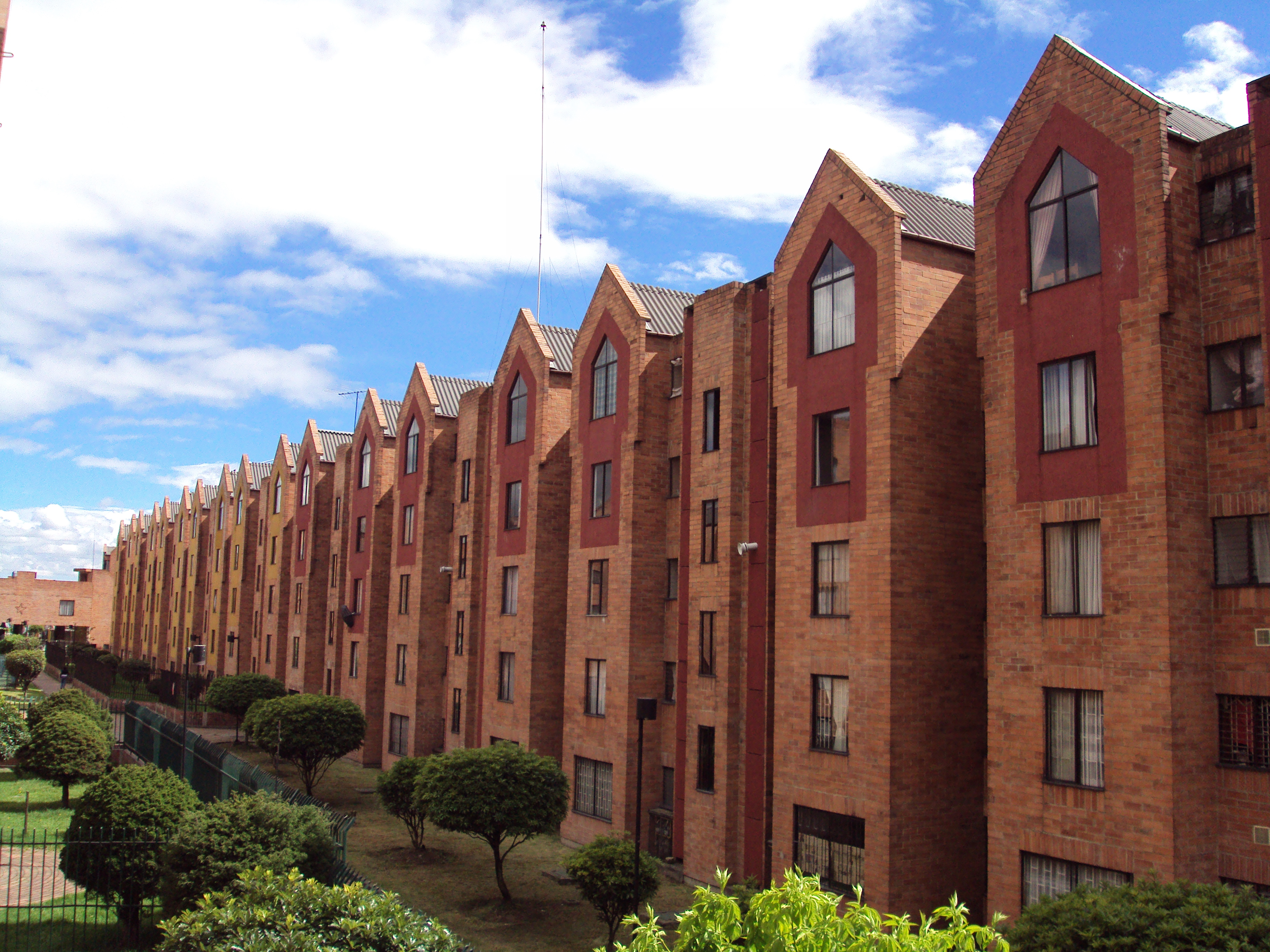
Ciudadela Colsubsidio, Bogotá

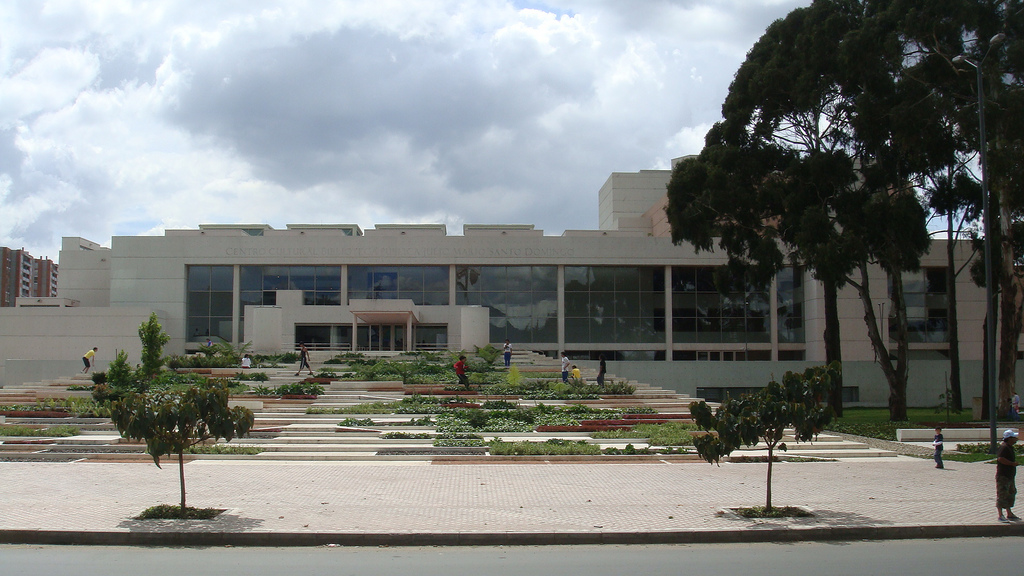
Julio Mario Santo Domingo Public Library, Bogotá

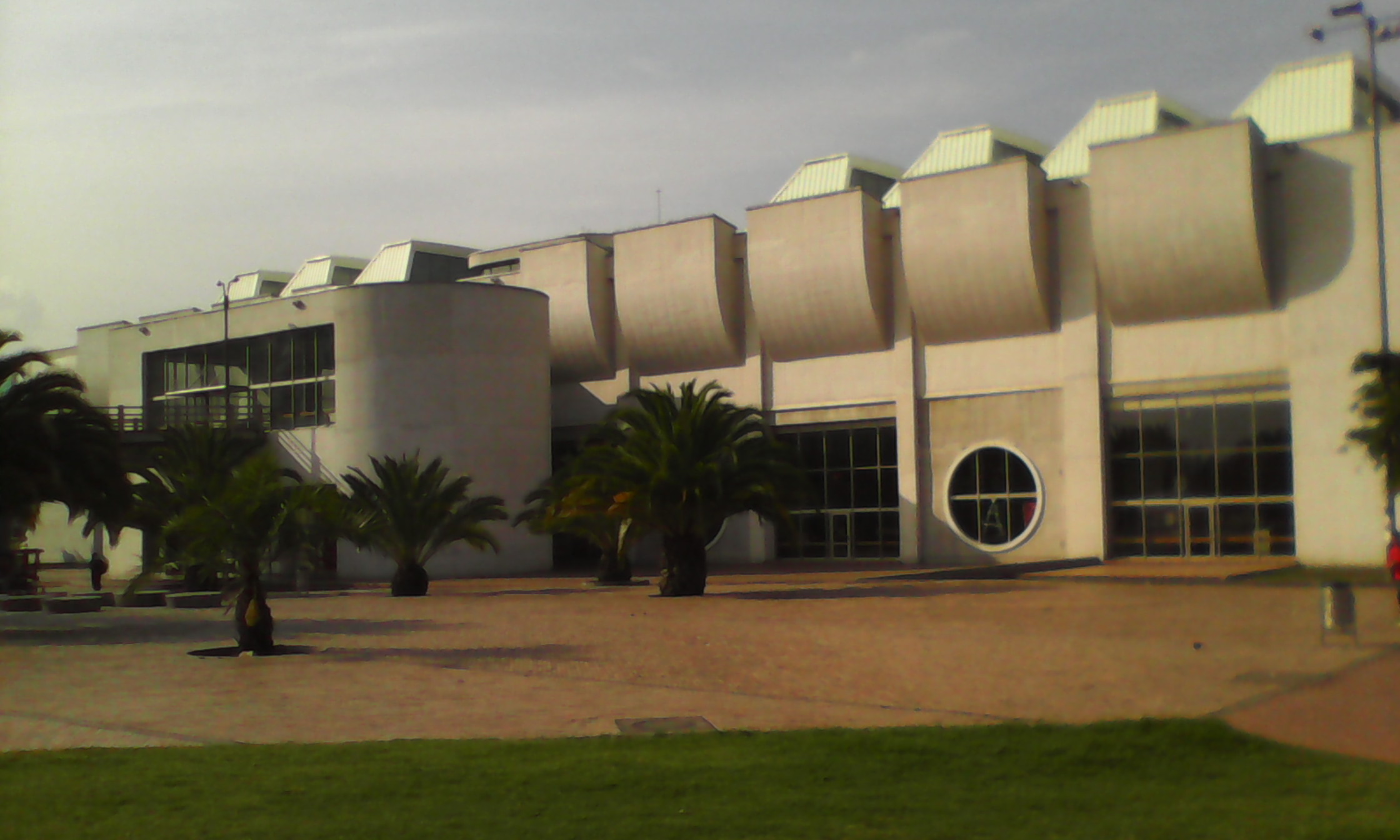
El Tintal Public Library, Bogotá

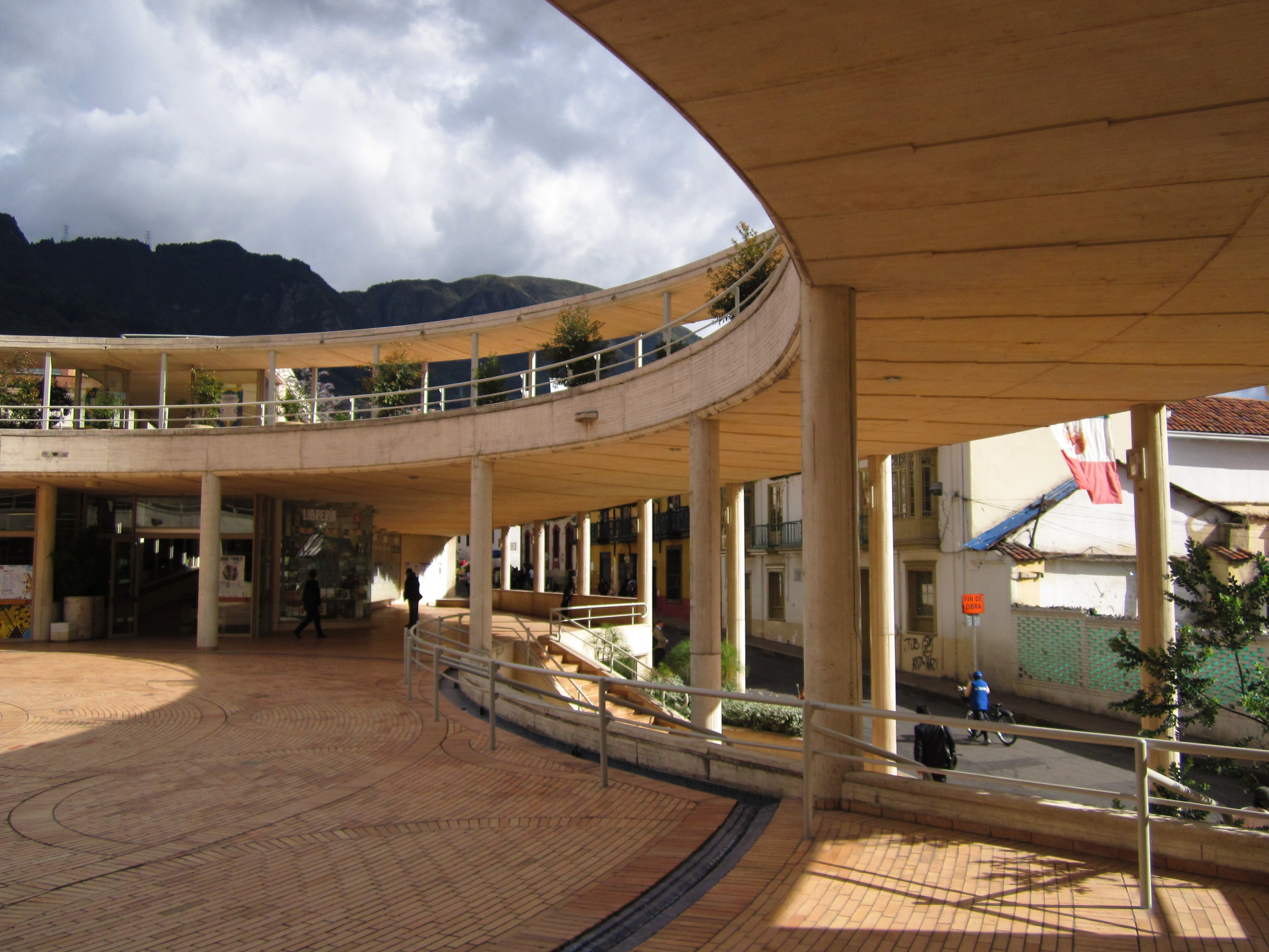
Centro Cultural Gabriel García Márquez, Bogotá

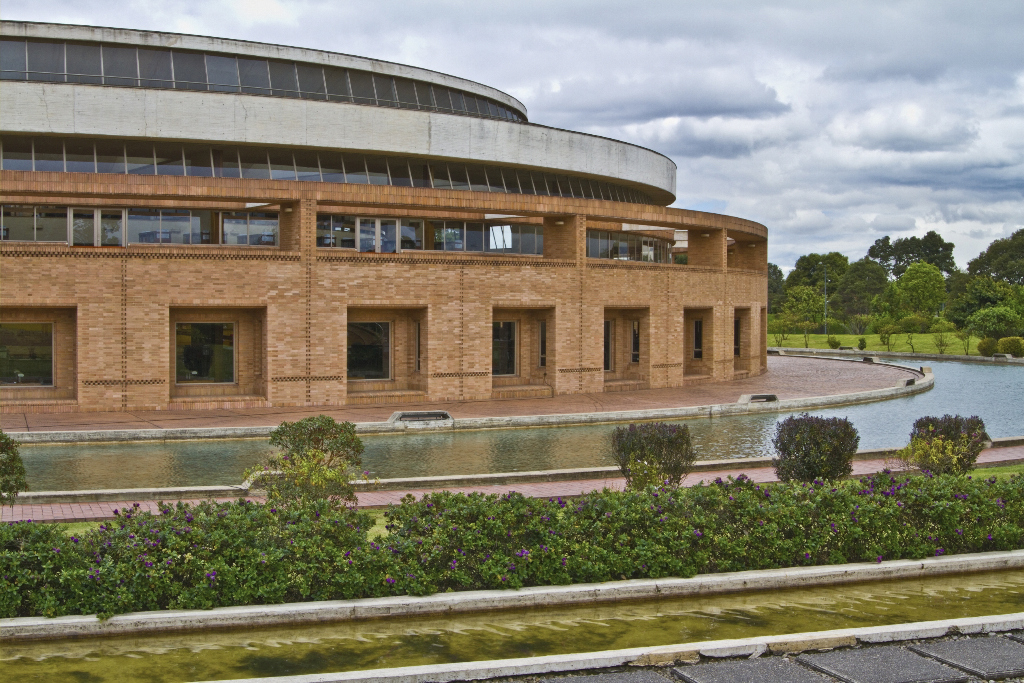
Virgilio Barco Public Library

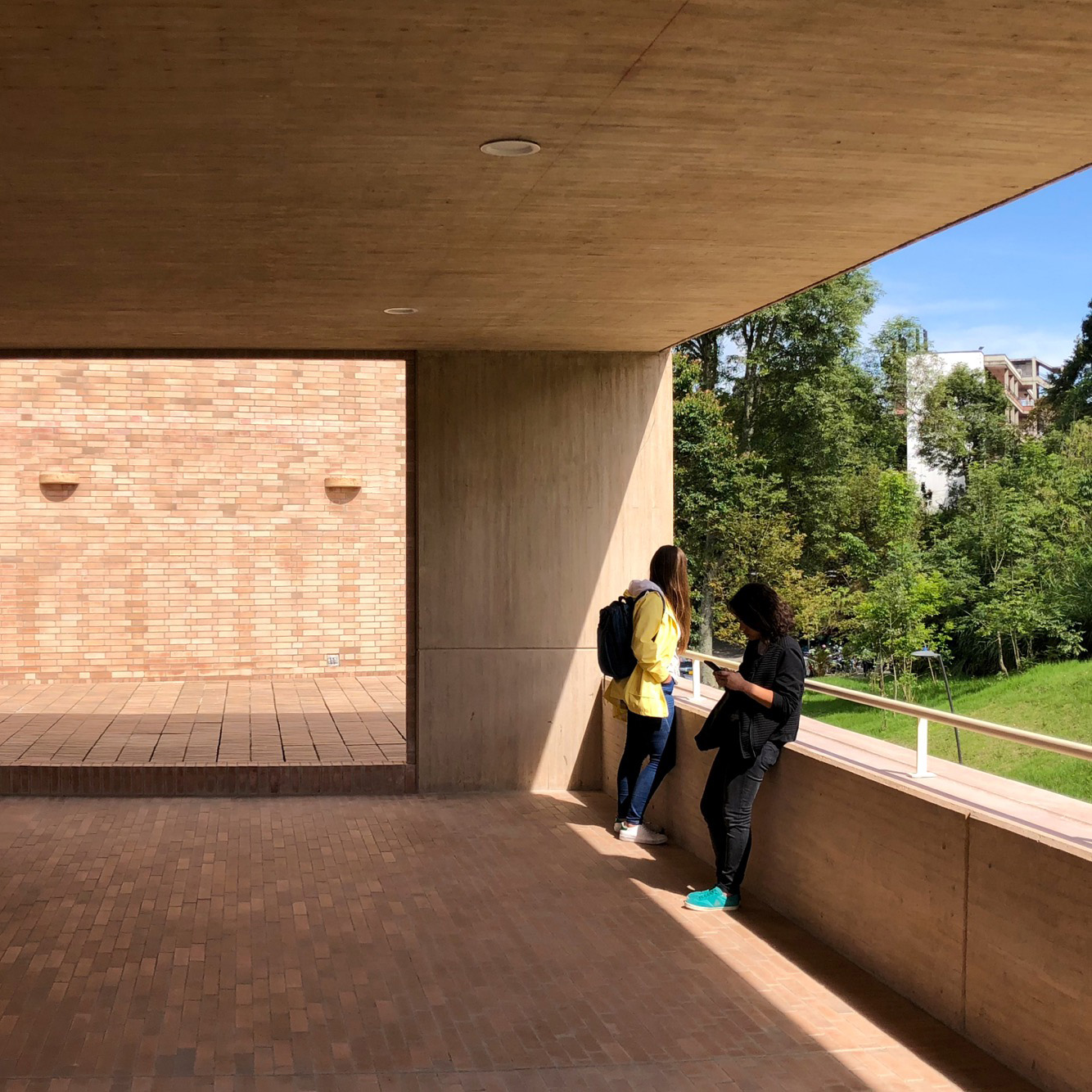
Cultural Center of the University of Caldas, Manizales

== See also ==
- Spanish Colonial architecture
- History of architecture
- Muisca architecture
