= Arturo Robledo Ocampo =

Arturo Robledo Ocampo (2 November 1930, Manizales, Colombia - 2007, Bogotá) was a Colombian architect.

He finished his school at Instituto del Carmen in Bogotá in 1946 and received a bachelor degree in Architecture at Universidad Nacional de Colombia. His work is discussed in the book Arturo Robledo; La arquitectura como modo de vida by Beatriz Garcia Moreno.

His work includes houses of the neighborhood Polo Club (1957), with his firm Robledo, Drews & Castro, Parque Metropolitano Simón Bolívar, and El Parque Residecial Calle 100 (1993).

He is most known for his work on the Parque Metropolitano Simón Bolívar, the biggest and most important in Bogotá.

With his classmates Ignacio Piñeros and Hans Drews they wrote a degree final work entitled "Nuevo campus para la Universidad de los Andes" (New campus for the University of the Andes). After graduation, he worked in the firm of Cuéllar Serrano. He worked on the Banco Iteramericano de Desarrollo and with the Sociedad Robledo Drews y Castro Ltda.

In 1982 he worked on the master plan for the Parque Metropolitano Simón Bolívar. With his firm, cooperated other local architectural firms, designing different visionary projects such as collective housing in different areas of the city, as is the case of Nueva Santa Fe de Bogotá and Calle 100 residential complex.
