= List of guided busways and BRT systems in the United Kingdom =

UK busways

This is a list of the past, present, planned or abandoned guided bus systems or bus rapid transit schemes in the United Kingdom, including segregated busways. Not included are bus priority schemes, bus lanes or local authority bus company quality contracts that do not involve guidance, significant segregation from the public highway or other bus rapid transit features. The UK does not have any implementations or proposals for rubber tyred trams such as Translohr or Bombardier Guided Light Transit.

== Present systems ==
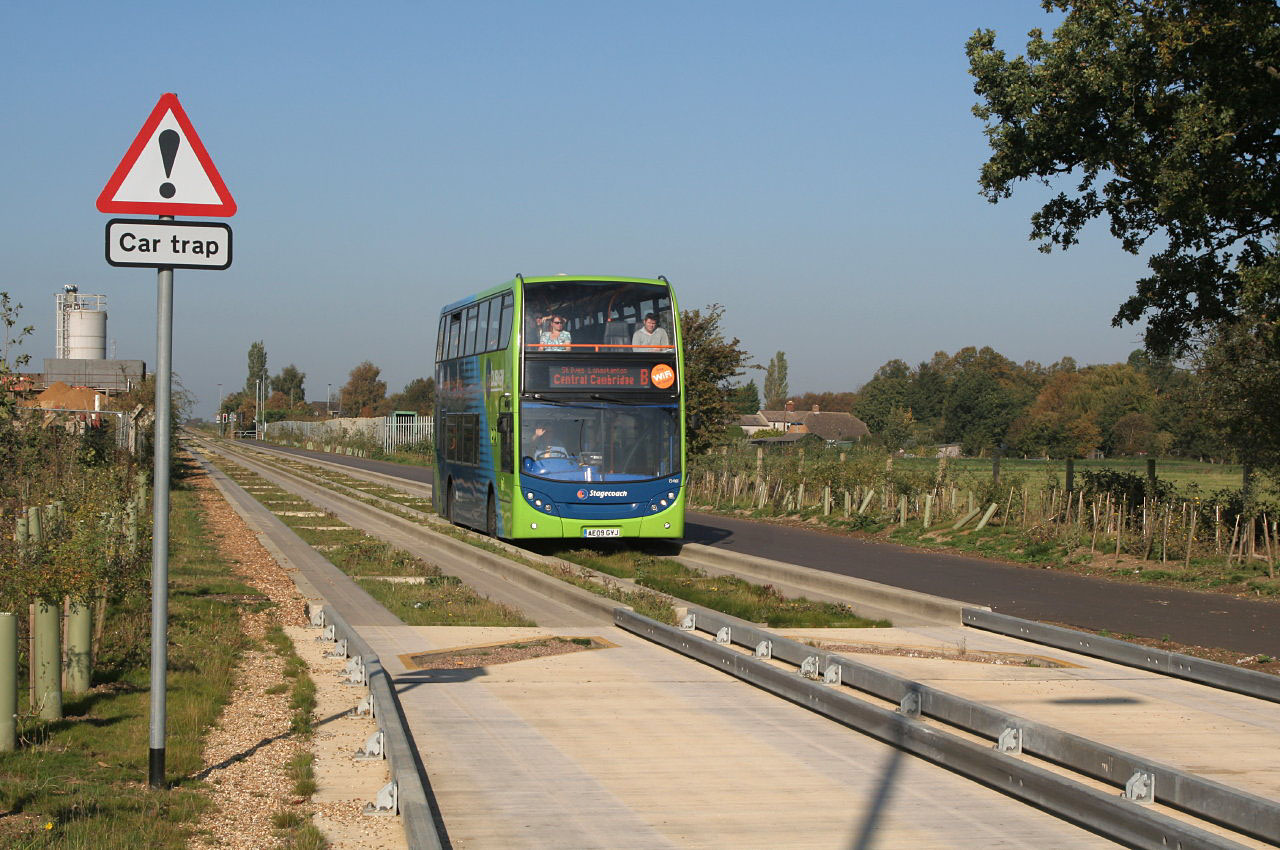
Cambridgeshire Guided Busway

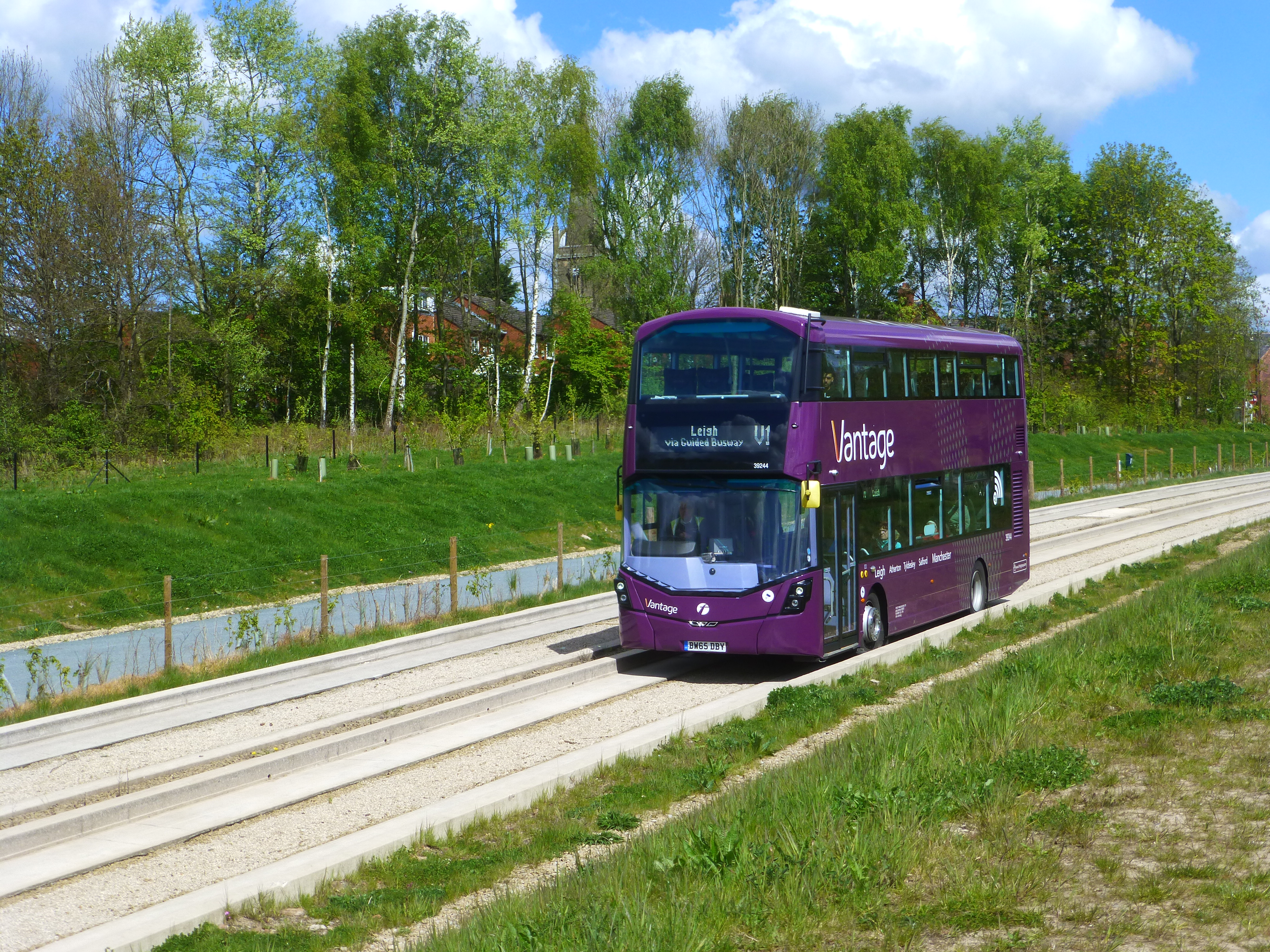
Leigh-Salford-Manchester Bus Rapid Transit

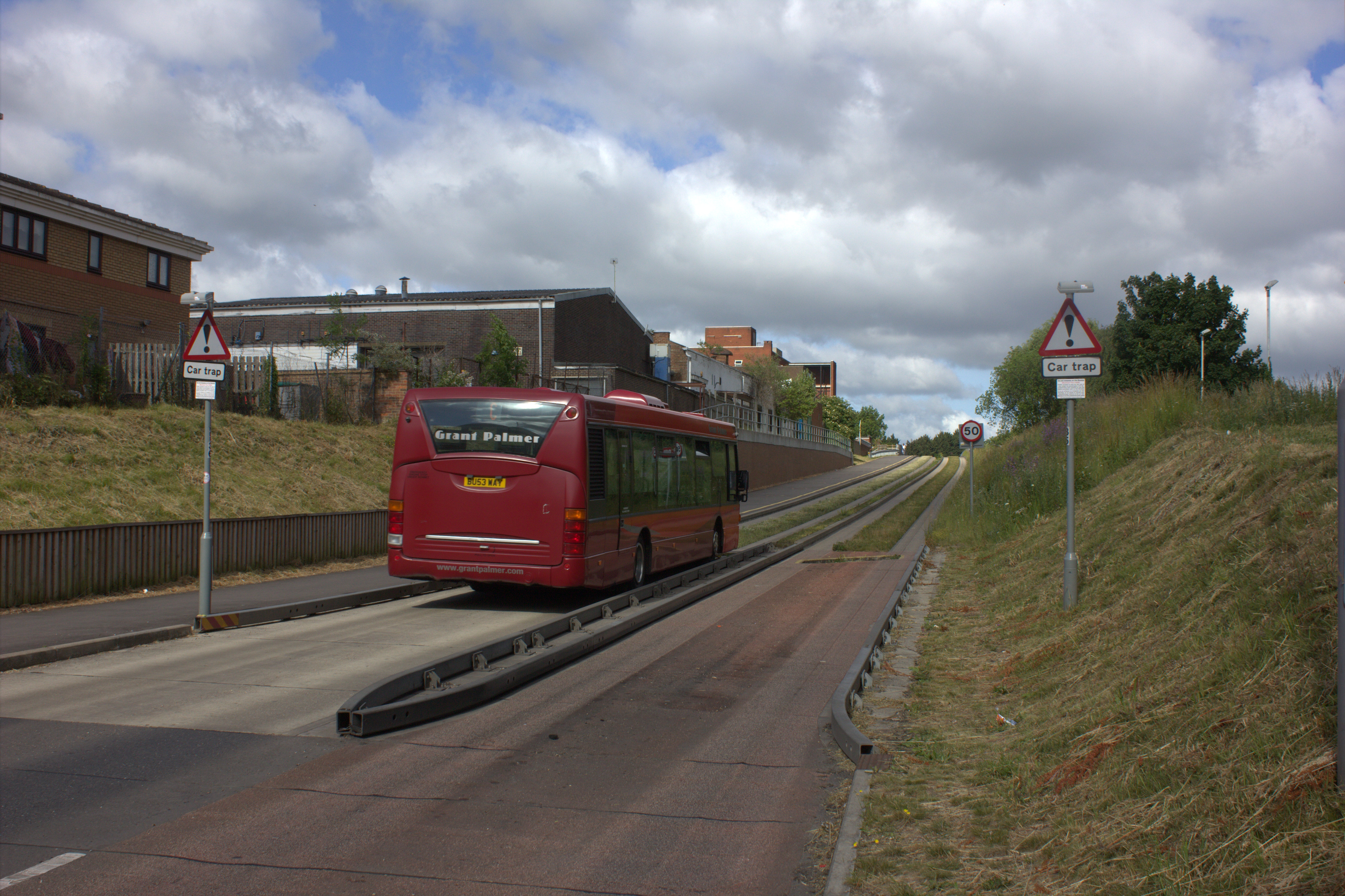
Luton to Dunstable Busway

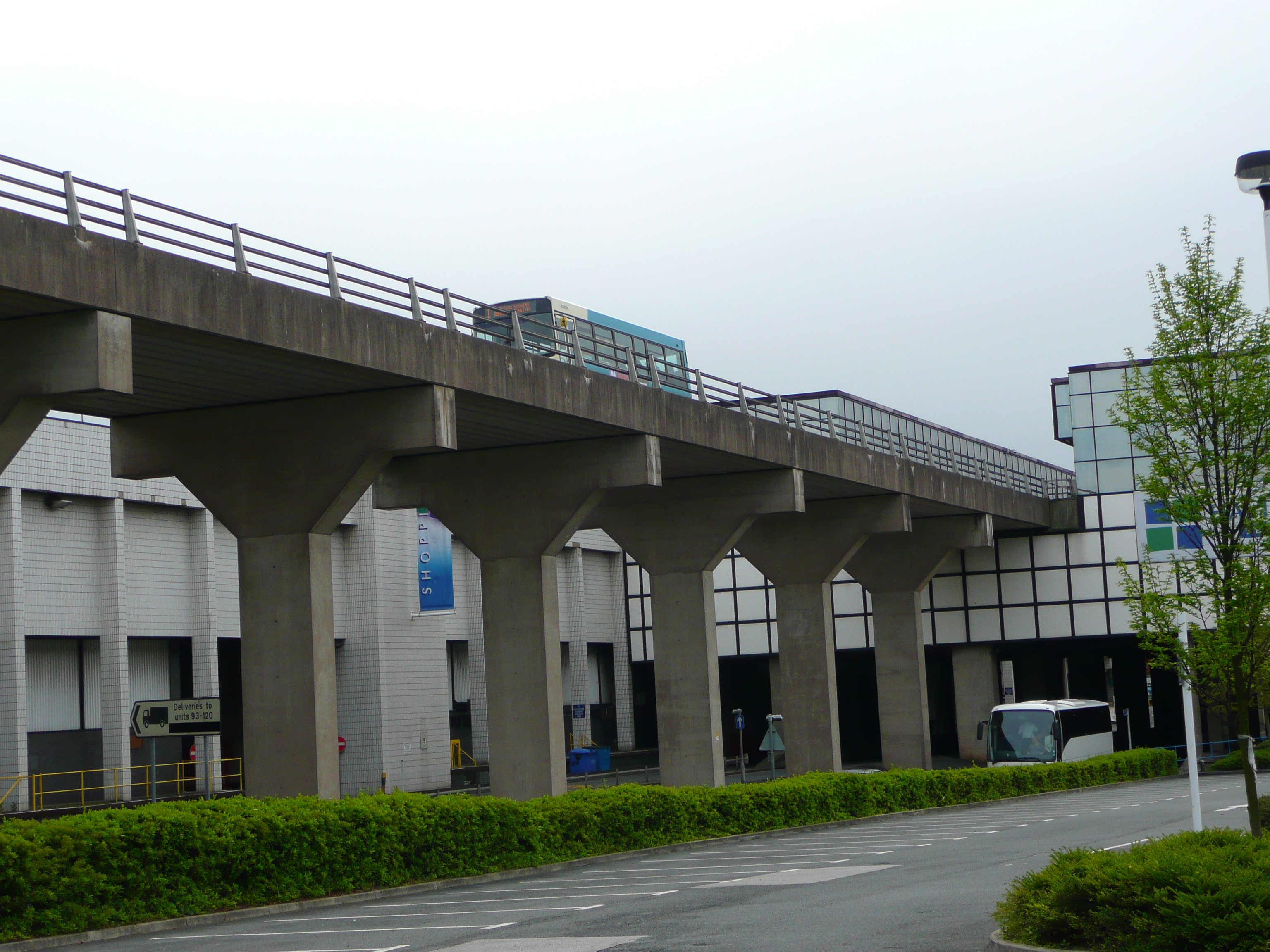
Runcorn Busway

| Location | System | Operator | Specification | Timeline |
|---|---|---|---|---|
| Belfast, Northern Ireland | Glider | Translink | | |
| Ipswich, Suffolk | Ipswich Rapid Transit (Superroute 66) | First Eastern Counties | It is a 219 yards (200 m) guided busway section. | Kesgrave - Grange Farm opened in 1995, it was regauged in 2005 for larger double-deck buses and second stretch of busway has been abandoned. |
| Runcorn, Cheshire | Runcorn Busway | Arriva North West | An unguided network built as part of the new town extension of Runcorn The busway is 14 miles (22 km) long, with an elevated section into a shopping area at the intersection | Phase 1 completed in 1971 as the world's first BRT system. Phase 2 completed in 1977. |
| Redditch, Worcestershire | Redditch Circular Busway | Diamond West Midlands | An unguided network built as part of the new town extension of Redditch, carrying the main circular bus routes. The system carries over 1.5 million passenger journeys per annum. | |
| London | East London Transit | Transport for London | Unguided with sections of segregated running | First phase (Ilford to Barking Riverside) completed in February 2010. Phase 2 (Beacontree Heath to Dagenham Dock) opened in 2013. Phase 3 (Little Heath to Barking Riverside) opened in 2017. |
| Thames Gateway, Kent | Fastrack | Go Ahead Fastrack | Unguided with sections of segregated running using standard buses. | Opened in phases in concert with planned local development: Route A (Dartford - Bluewater) opened June 2007 Route B (Dartford - Gravesend) opened March 2006 Route C (Dartford - Temple Hill) opened 10 November 2024 and was replaced by Route B on 5 April 2025 Route E (Bluewater - Gravesend) Opened 10 November 2024 Route F (Bluewater - Greenhithe) Opened 5 April 2025 Route N (Amazon LCY3 - Gravesend) Opened 16 August 2025 |
| Leeds, West Yorkshire | Leeds Superbus | First West Yorkshire | Corridors with sections of guided busway. | A61 Scott Hall Road and King Lane, four sections, 1 mile (1.5 km), opened 1995 while A64 York Road / B6159 (formerly A63) Selby Road, three sections, 1 mile (2 km), opened 2001. |
| Bradford, West Yorkshire | Manchester Road Quality Bus Initiative Bradford end | First West Yorkshire | 1 mile (2.3 km) of guided busway | A641 Manchester Road, opened October 2001. |
| Crawley, West Sussex | Crawley Fastway | Metrobus | A 15 miles (24 km) two-route system with segregated lanes and 1 mile (1.5 km) of guided busway. | Southgate Avenue opened August 2003 and Fastway opened December 2004. |
| Gateshead, Tyne & Wear | Centrelink | Go North East | Was an infrastructure project including an exclusive busway for bendy bus services | From Gateshead to the Metrocentre. In 2020, bendy bus services are long gone and the Centrelink project turned into a bus lane along the river with no priorities. |
| Luton, Bedfordshire | The Luton to Dunstable Busway | Arriva, Centrebus and Grant Palmer | It runs for 6.1 miles, 4.8mi are guided track with a maximum speed of 50 mph. | Runs between Luton Airport and Houghton Regis via Dunstable following the Dunstable branch line, which closed in 1989, running parallel to the A505 (Dunstable Road) and A5065 (Hatters Way). The £91 million scheme opened on 25 September 2013. |
| Cambridge, Huntingdon and St Ives, Cambridgeshire | Cambridgeshire Guided Busway | Stagecoach in Huntingdonshire & Whippet | BRT corridor incorporating "just over 16 miles" of guided busway, using the alignments of the former Cambridge and Huntingdon railway and also of the Varsity Line. | St Ives Park & Ride - Milton Road, Cambridge, construction begun in January 2007 and opened to traffic on Sunday 7 August 2011. Cambridge railway station - Trumpington Park & Ride opened 7 August 2011. |
| Gosport and Fareham, Hampshire | South East Hampshire Bus Rapid Transit | First Hampshire & Dorset (Eclipse) | 3 miles (4.5 km), unguided, between constructed by Hampshire County Council using the route of the former Gosport to Fareham railway line to reduce congestion on the parallel A32. | The scheme was proposed following the collapse of the light rail scheme using the same route and funding was approved in July 2009 for the £20m scheme. It opened in April 2012. |
| Leigh, Salford & Manchester, Greater Manchester | Leigh-Salford-Manchester Bus Rapid Transit | Transport for Greater Manchester | The 29-stop scheme extends a total of 14 miles (22 km). The route is 80% segregated along its length. | From Leigh or Atherton to Manchester via Tyldesley and Ellenbrook. It makes partial use of a former railway line to form a 4 miles (7 km) guided busway between Leigh, Tyldesley and Ellenbrook until it joins the East Lancashire Road. Buses then continue through Salford, into Manchester city centre along 9 miles (15 km) of segregated bus lanes before taking Oxford Road to the University of Manchester and Manchester Royal Infirmary. A dedicated Park and Ride site was constructed on the East Lancashire Road at the point it intersects the M60 motorway. Road junction works began in late-2011 and the full busway opened on 3 April 2016. It forms part of the wider Manchester Quality Bus Corridor (Manchester QBC) and Cross City Bus network. |
| Sheffield, South Yorkshire | Bus Rapid Transit North | First South Yorkshire | Running a 6 miles (9 km) route. Otherwise the service runs over a similar specification route to those provided for stopping buses. Between Sheffield Interchange and Rotherham Interchange opened in September 2016. The designated 'X1 Steel Link' route runs every 10 minutes at peak. Includes an 875 yards (800 m) road link under the Tinsley Viaduct at Meadowhall. | |
| Bristol | MetroBus | First West of England | Only the Ashton Vale to Temple Meads route runs along a guided busway track; on the other two routes the BRT services share bus lanes with stopping buses - except for a reserved newbuild junction onto the M32 motorway. | Three routes opened in May 2018; Ashton Vale to Bristol Temple Meads station (AVTM) and two routes from the North Fringe towards Bristol City Centre and Hengrove Park respectively. |

== FTR bendy bus routes ==
Leeds, unguided, operated by First Leeds from 2007-2012, after the end of FTR services the buses were rebranded Hyperlink and redeployed alongside Yorks on the 72 route between Leeds and Bradford before being replaced by conventional double deckers in 2016.

York Between Acomb and University of York, from 2006-2012 operated by First York.

Swansea (Wales), unguided and operated by First Cymru branded Swansea Metro. Services started in September 2009 from Morriston Hospital to Singleton Hospital via Morriston, Swansea railway station, the Kingsway, Swansea bus station, the Civic Centre and Swansea University. Withdrawn in August 2015 and replaced with standard single deck buses, later in 2015 the two way bus lane was replaced with a conventional one way system in response to high-profile accidents, the 'bendy buses' were returned to service in 2016 as a student shuttle between Swansea University campuses.

== Past systems ==
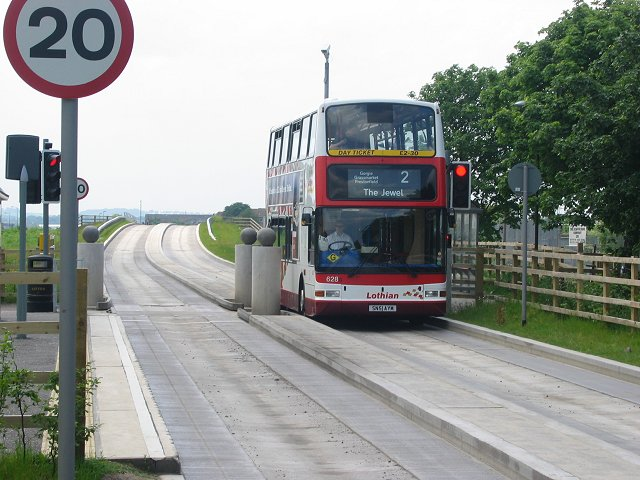
A Lothian Buses guided bus traversing the former Fastlink guided busway in Edinburgh (alignment now used by Edinburgh Trams)

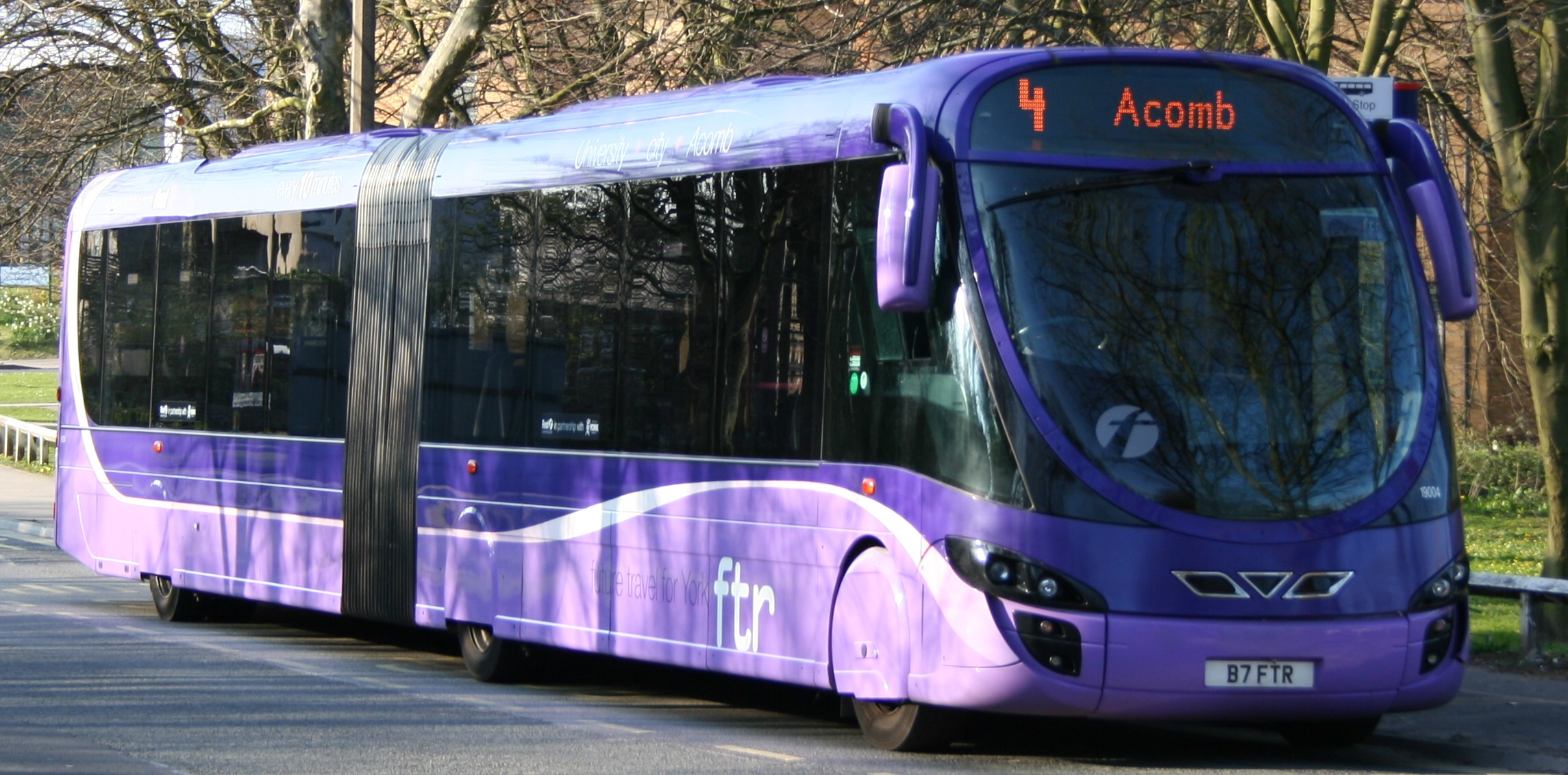
A First York operated Wright StreetCar on an FTR bus rapid transit scheme in York

- Birmingham. Tracline 65 was an upgraded route with the first guided busway in the UK. There was a 600-metre section of guideway in Erdington. It opened in 1984 and closed in 1987.
- Edinburgh, Edinburgh Fastlink operated by Lothian Buses. Originally called WEBS, the West Edinburgh Bus Scheme, a group of bus priority improvements that included a 1 mile (1.5 km) section of guided busway.
  - Stenhouse - Broomhouse, opened in December 2004, designed to be used for Line 2 of the Edinburgh Tram Network. In January 2009 it closed to enable conversion to tramway. The two bus services using the guideway were re-routed.

== Future systems ==
=== Under construction ===
- Colchester Rapid Transit. In January 2023, Essex County Council announced a rapid transit system for Colchester, set to be operational in 2025 or 2026. The planned route will connect from the A12 Park and ride (including the Colchester Community Stadium and Northern Gateway development nearby), to the University of Essex and new garden community due to be built near Elmstead Market. The system will also see the construction of a corridor along Northern Approach, which has been in planning since 2006. The corridor construction, which started in August 2023, has notably caused damage to properties next to the route.
- West Midlands Sprint. A limited stop service with dedicated bus lanes, with a total of 7 routes to be operational by 2026.
  - Birmingham - Solihull - Birmingham Airport
  - Birmingham - Perry Barr - Walsall
  - Birmingham - Langley - Sutton Coldfield
  - Birmingham - Bearwood - Dudley
  - Birmingham - Bearwood - Halesowen
  - Birmingham - Selly Oak - Northfield - Longbridge
  - Hall Green - Solihull - Birmingham Airport - Birmingham Interchange

=== Planned or proposed ===
- Cambridge There are two busway projects being planned by the GCP (Greater Cambridge Partnership).
  - Cambourne - Cambridge busway connecting Cambourne 12 km west of Cambridge to the city.
  - CSET (Cambridge South East Transport), connecting Babraham to the existing southern busway via the Biomedical Campus.
- Coventry Sprint. A proposed application of the FTR (bus) over a 19 miles (30 km) route, 34% segregated
  - Nuneaton - Coventry - Kenilworth, route consultation ongoing
- Glasgow, Clyde Fastlink, along the north bank of the River Clyde, with segregated running for the majority of its length outside the city centre. It has been approved by Scottish ministers and is expected to be ready for the 2014 Commonwealth Games.
  - Glasgow City Centre - Glasgow Harbour with the majority of the route segregated.
- London
  - West London Transit, being considered following the abandonment of plans for the West London Tram in August 2007
- Cardiff
  - South Wales Metro includes plans to install BRT systems along the main roads in Cardiff.
- Hertfordshire
  - Hertfordshire Essex Rapid Transit (HERT), a proposal currently being evaluated by Hertfordshire County Council; vehicles have not been specified, but several possible transport modes are being considered, including trams, guided busways, or trackless trams. The scheme may involve converting the single-track Abbey line, which runs from Watford Junction to St Albans Abbey, into a busway.

== Abandoned proposals ==
- Leeds, following refusal of funding for the proposed Leeds Supertram, a replacement system was proposed by the government, which included a three-line 12-mile (20 km) trolleybus network. 38% would run on guideways or on bus lanes. The scheme received a negative assessment from the inspector at a public inquiry, and approval was refused in May 2016.
- Bath, Somerset, the Department of Transport approved funding with 1 mile (1.4 km) of busway, but this has been abandoned.
- London
  - Millennium Transit, a segregated busway intended to link the Millennium Dome with Charlton and Greenwich railway stations, part of which was to include a 1 mile (1.3 km) section of electronic guidance. Intended to be operational when the Dome opened, the electronic guidance technology was abandoned following concerns that neither the system nor the driver was in a position to avoid sudden obstacles. The busway was later replaced by a dual carriageway due to safety concerns.
  - Greenwich Waterfront Transit, planned for completion by 2011, abandoned in 2008 due to cancellation of Thames Gateway Bridge.
- Stoke-on-Trent Streetcar, primarily to link the railway station to the city centre, but would have also linked the rest of the city's six towns and neighbouring Newcastle-under-Lyme and Kidsgrove. Major destinations included both universities, the hospital and both major football stadia.

== See also ==
- List of bus rapid transit systems
- List of bus operating companies
- Rapid transit in the United Kingdom
