= List of modern tramways in the United Kingdom =

This is a list of extant tramways in the United Kingdom. For a full historical list of all tramway systems that have existed in the country, see List of town tramway systems in the United Kingdom.

== Operating systems ==
Operational tram systems in the United Kingdom

Location	System	Annual ridership in 2023/24 (millions)	System length	Number of Stops	Lines	Traction type	Date opened	Notes
Blackpool	Blackpool Tramway	4.7	17 km (11 mi)	39	3	Electric	29 September 1885	
Edinburgh	Edinburgh Trams	10.1	18 km (11.5 mi)	23	1	Electric	31 May 2014	Extension opened 7 June 2023
South London	Tramlink, formerly Croydon Tramlink	20	27 km (17 mi)	39	4	Electric	10 May 2000	
Greater Manchester	Metrolink	42	103 km (64 mi)	99	8	Electric	6 April 1992	
Nottingham	Nottingham Express Transit	15.5	32 km (20 mi)	50	2	Electric	9 March 2004	
Sheffield and Rotherham	South Yorkshire Supertram	8.7	34 km (21 mi)	51	4	Electric	21 March 1994	Part of the route operates as a tram-train
West Midlands (Birmingham–Wolverhampton)	West Midlands Metro	8.3	24 km (14.9 mi)	35	1	Electric	30 May 1999	2/3 lines under construction.

== Systems under construction ==
- Cardiff Crossrail - Construction on Phase 1, from Cardiff Central to Cardiff Bay, began in July 2026 and is anticipated to be operational in 2028.Future phases of the project will see the tram line run from Plasdŵr, in the northwest of the city, to the proposed Cardiff Parkway railway station in the east of the city.
- Coventry Very Light Rail – 220 metre test line under construction between Coventry Railway Station and City Market, expected to open in summer 2025. Full line still in development, with construction expected to begin in late 2025.

== Proposed systems ==
- KenEx Tram – Thames crossing between Kent and Essex
- Wirral Street Car
- HERT (Hertfordshire and Essex Rapid Transit)
- Coventry Very Light Rail
- West Yorkshire mass transit system (Leeds)
- Bournemouth - https://www.bbc.co.uk/news/articles/c7v48v34148o

== Cancelled systems ==
- Bristol Supertram
- CITI Belfast
- Leeds Supertram
- Merseytram
- Penistone Line Tram-Train
- South Hampshire Rapid Transit
- Tees Valley Metro
- London
  - Cross River Tram - Camden Town and King’s Cross to Brixton and Peckham
  - East London Transit – built as bus rapid transit
  - West London Tram - Uxbridge to Shepherd’s Bush

== See also ==
- Light Rail Transit Association
- List of guided busways and BRT systems in the United Kingdom
- List of town tramway systems in the United Kingdom
- List of trolleybus systems in the United Kingdom
- Rapid transit in the United Kingdom
- Trams in England
- Urban rail in the United Kingdom
