= Stoke Streetcar =

Proposed bus service in England

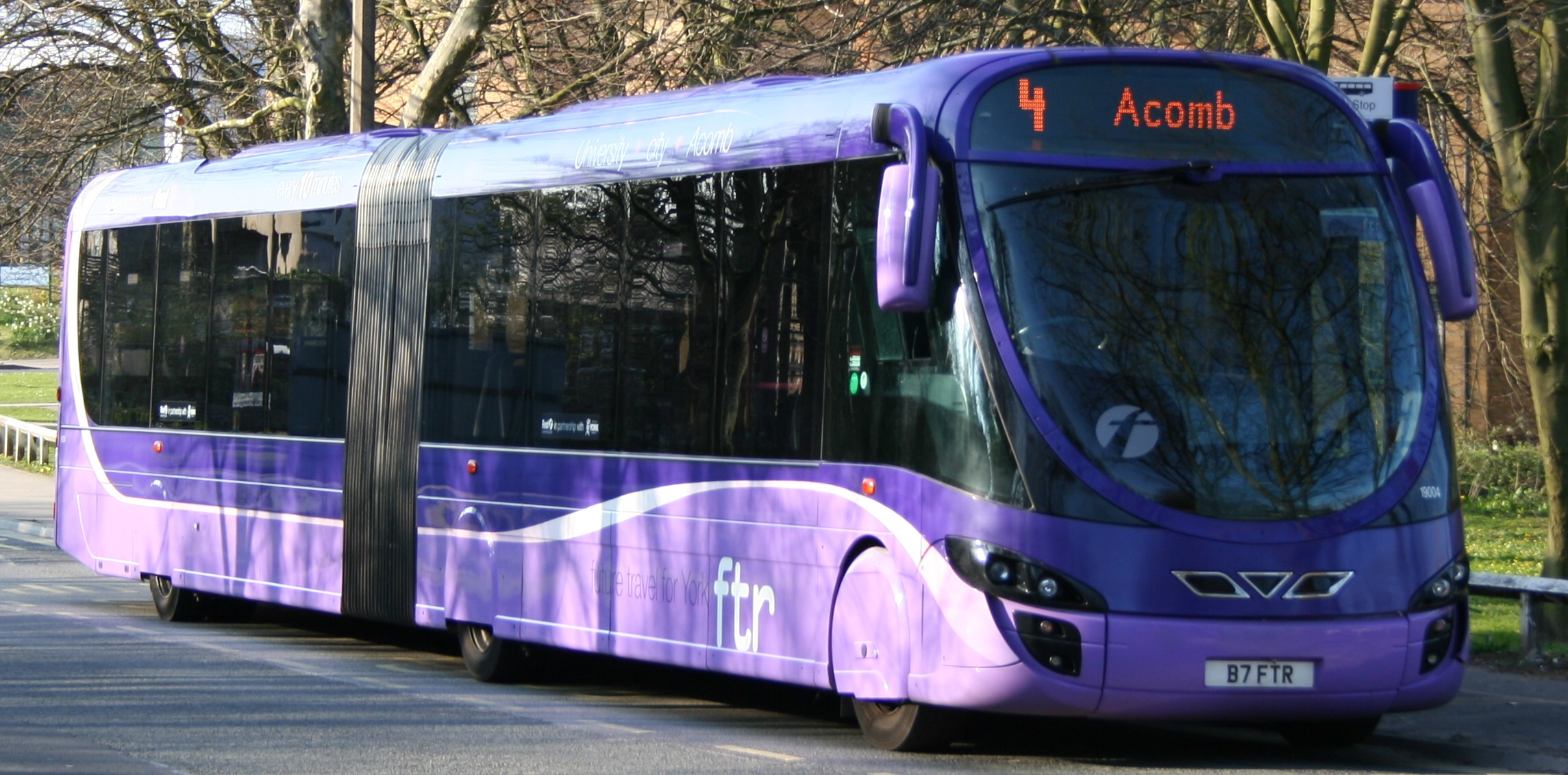
- Proposed FTR bus as seen in York

Overview
- Locale: The Potteries Urban Area
- Transit type: Bus rapid transit
- Number of lines: 2
- Number of stations: 12 after Phase 1; 19 after Phase 2

Operation
- Operator: First Potteries
- Number of vehicles: 14 in Phase 1
- Headway: 10 minutes

Technical
- System length: 13.8 mi (22.2 km) after Phase 1; 21.8 mi (35.1 km) after Phase 2

The Stoke Streetcar was a proposed bus rapid transit system for The Potteries Urban Area (Stoke-on-Trent, Newcastle-under-Lyme and Kidsgrove) in England. It would have consisted of two lines, serving five of Stoke's six towns, the city centre with its new Central Business District, Newcastle, Kidsgrove, Stoke-on-Trent railway station, the University Hospital of North Staffordshire, both universities (including the new University Quarter) and both football clubs. The proposal was developed in partnership with First Group, and included plans to use the same Wright StreetCar as the FTR services found in York, Leeds and Swansea.

== Suspension ==
In late June 2010, the UK Department for Transport announced that councils would no longer be considering applications for funding for major transport schemes. For this reason, Stoke's city council decided to suspend work on the project. However, work is still planned for the development of the University Boulevard and the new Hanley bus station.

== Network ==
Construction of the Green Line was proposed to begin in 2013 for completion in 2017. It would have linked four of Stoke's six towns, including the city centre, as well as Newcastle, Kidsgrove, the railway station and both universities. 14 FTR buses would be used on this route to ensure a waiting time of 10 minutes. The second phase, known as the Blue Line, would link another of Stoke's towns, Longton, to the new network and have the same core as the Green Line.

=== University Boulevard ===
The core of the Streetcar network was to be a new boulevard linking the inconveniently placed railway station and the city centre. Despite the demise of the network, the city council are still continuing with plans to build this boulevard. Most of the boulevard will follow what is currently College Road from the railway station to the Central Business District, before linking to the new bus station on John Street. There were further proposals to make College Road available for local and bus traffic only, possibly by means of bus gates.

=== Stations ===
Green line	Blue line
Kidsgrove (possibly near railway station); Tunstall; Burslem (for Port Vale and Ceramica); City centre (for Potteries Shopping Centre and new East West Centre); Central business district (probably near Smithfield bottle kiln); Stoke College; Staffordshire University; Stoke railway station; Stoke town; University Hospital; Newcastle; Keele University (and science park)	Newcastle; Wolstanton; Etruria Valley (Park and Ride); Festival Park; City centre; Central business district; Stoke College; Staffordshire University; Stoke railway station; Stoke town; Sideway (Park and Ride); Trentham Lakes (for Stoke City FC); Longton (probably at railway station); Meir
