= Rapid transit in the United Kingdom =

Operational rapid transit systems in the United Kingdom

Rapid transit in the United Kingdom consists of four systems: the London Underground and the Docklands Light Railway in London; the Tyne and Wear Metro in Tyne and Wear; and the Glasgow Subway. The term may also include commuter rail systems with aspects of rapid transit such as the London Overground and Elizabeth line in London, and Merseyrail in the Liverpool City Region. Rapid transit has also been proposed in other UK cities including Sheffield, Manchester, Leeds, Birmingham, Cardiff, Bristol, and Cambridge.

== History ==
The United Kingdom is the birthplace of rapid transit, with London and Liverpool hosting the world's first and second urban rail transits and Glasgow the fourth. From 1893 to 1956, the Liverpool Overhead Railway was the only elevated rapid transit in the country; however it fell into disuse and was demolished in 1957. In the 20th and 21st centuries, the United Kingdom has chosen not to prioritise investment in rapid transit schemes; instead cities like Manchester, Sheffield, and Edinburgh have opted for trams.

== List of systems ==
City	System	Start of operations	System length	Lines (Note: Indicates lines that are in operation for operational systems, lines that are under construction for under construction systems and proposed lines for proposed systems.)	Stations (Note: Indicates stations that are in operation for operational systems, stations that are under construction for under construction systems and proposed stations for proposed systems.)	Voltage	Notes
London	London Underground	10 January 1863	402 km	11	272	630 V DC fourth rail	The oldest rapid transit system, incorporating the world's first underground railway.
London	Docklands Light Railway	31 August 1987	34 km	7 (routes)	45	750 V DC third rail	An automated light metro system opened in 1987 to serve the redeveloped Docklands area of London.
Tyne and Wear	Tyne and Wear Metro	11 August 1980	74.5 km	2	60	1500 V DC OLE	A rapid transit and light rail system in North East England, serving Newcastle upon Tyne, Gateshead, South Tyneside, North Tyneside and Sunderland in the Tyne and Wear region.
Glasgow	Glasgow Subway	14 December 1896	10.5 km	1	15	600 V DC third rail	An underground light metro line in Glasgow. It is the third-oldest underground metro system in the world after the London Underground and the Budapest Metro, and the only underground metro system in the British Isles outside England.

The following are usually referred to as commuter rail systems, but possess aspects of rapid transit:

City	System	Start of operations	System length	Lines	Stations	Voltage	Notes
London	London Overground	11 November 2007	123.6 km (official lines)	8	112	third-rail 750 V DC and 25 kV 50 Hz AC OLE	A suburban rail network in the United Kingdom, serving a large part of Greater London and parts of Hertfordshire. Contains the East London line, a former London Underground line.
London	Elizabeth line	24 May 2022	136 km	1	41	25 kV 50 Hz AC OLE	A railway line in London and its environs constructed under the Crossrail project, providing a new east-west route across Greater London. It provides a high-frequency commuter/suburban passenger service linking parts of Berkshire and Buckinghamshire, via central London, to Essex and South East London, relieving the pressure on other railway services.
Liverpool	Merseyrail	1886 (Mersey Railway)	121 km (official lines)	2 official and one unofficial line)	68	third-rail 750 V DC	A commuter rail network, in the Liverpool City Region, England. The network has 68 stations running on 75 miles of route, of which 6.5 miles are underground, forming one of the most heavily used railway networks in the UK outside London.
Cardiff Capital Region	South Wales Metro	2025	169.2 km	9	94	25 kV AC OLE	

=== Defunct systems ===
- Liverpool Overhead Railway

=== Cancelled systems ===
- Picc-Vic tunnel

=== Proposed systems ===
- Bristol Underground
- Cambridge Metro
- Colchester Rapid Transit Metro
- Crossrail 2
- Glasgow Metro (light rail)
- HERT (Hertfordshire and Essex Rapid Transit)
- North and West London Light Railway
- South Hampshire Rapid Transit
- Taunton metro rail
- West London Orbital
- West Yorkshire (Leeds) transit

== See also ==
- Urban rail in the United Kingdom
- List of modern tramways in the United Kingdom
- List of guided busways and BRT systems in the United Kingdom
