= Clyde Fastlink =

Bus rapid transit system in Glasgow, Scotland

Clyde Fastlink is a high-frequency bus rapid transit system in Glasgow, Scotland. The system was designed to provide greater connectivity and faster journey times between Glasgow City Centre and the Queen Elizabeth University Hospital in Govan, as well as to several other key developments along the north and south banks of the Clyde Waterfront.

The project's initial conception and construction was led by Strathclyde Partnership for Transport (SPT) and Glasgow City Council. Operation of the system is contracted by the transport authority to Stagecoach West Scotland as an extension to their existing X19 service. McGill's also run their 23 and 26 services along sections of the right-of-way. The 4-mile-long (6.4 km) route began construction in September 2013, and was opened to passenger service in 2015 after over £40m of investment.

== Route ==
The system runs along segregated busways and bus lanes running parallel to main roads, as well as mixed traffic sections. priority signalling is used to allow buses in the system to move faster than regular traffic. The current 'North Bank' route originates in the City Centre, integrating with Glasgow's two major mainline rail hubs, Glasgow Queen Street and Glasgow Central. The route then follows the River Clyde in a westerly direction along the Broomielaw and over the Clyde Arc bridge, where it travels west on Govan Road's segregated infrastructure past the BBC offices at Pacific Quay. It continues towards the Govan Interchange and bypasses the heart of Govan along the segregated section at Golspie Street, before making its way towards the Queen Elizabeth Univestity Hospital (QEUH) via Govan road.

The route was chosen in order to better-connect major transport hubs in the city centre to the new Queen Elizabeth Hospital, serve the burgeoning Clyde corridor on both sides of the river, and to better connect the underserved communities of Govan and Linthouse.

== History ==
The Fastlink scheme was initially proposed in 2007 as a way to improve Glasgow's public transport connections in preparation for the 2014 Commonwealth Games. The first phase of the original scheme, running from Glasgow Central Station to Glasgow Harbour, was given planning approval by Glasgow City Council in July 2006. It was intended to be an interim measure before the introduction of light rail sometime after 2010. The scheme was originally expected to be completed in 2010 and to cost £42 million.

Initially, a "North-bank" and "South-bank" route were proposed, with the North Bank route running from the city centre to Ferry Road in Yoker. However, Glasgow City Council's request for funding from the Scottish Government was rejected as part of the government's Strategic Transport Projects Review, citing its lack of regional impact, its failure to tackle congestion around Glasgow Central station and its lack of clear impact on emissions reductions. Instead, the Government promised to investigate the construction of a wider light rail network across Glasgow, and new city centre stations to resolve city-centre connectivity issues.

== Impact and Criticisms ==
Despite being slated to open in time for the 2014 Commonwealth Games in Glasgow, Fastlink did not see passenger service until a year later. Additionally, the project fell significantly short of the initial proposal, which had called for a "tram on wheels" type vehicle to be used with off-board ticketing, similar to those on Belfast's Glider system and said to be capable of providing service levels of up to 12 buses per hour at peak times.

These features were not part of the system upon its opening in 2015. Privately owned bus companies McGill's and Stagecoach now compete for passengers along the route, using regular low-floor buses which must at minimum comply with Euro 6 emission standards. There is no off-board ticketing at Fastlink stops, hence passengers cannot transfer between different operators on the route on a single fare. Service levels on the system go up to every 12 minutes at peak times.

In October 2015, local news outlets reported that bus operators on the Fastlink route had advised drivers to avoid using the lanes, due to heavy delays caused by faulty priority signalling. Operators McGill's and Stagecoach criticised Glasgow City Council for the running of the scheme due to this, with McGill's announcing the cancellation of its dedicated F1 Service soon after. The company stated that this was due to service overcrowding on the corridor rather than priority signalling issues.

The removal of this service means that no operators now serve the entire originally proposed route for Fastlink, which ran in a city centre loop past Buchanan bus station, before heading south towards the Broomielaw. In addition, McGill's remaining 26 and 23 services use only limited parts of the bus priority lanes.

SPT claim in their evaluation of the scheme that journey times on the Fastlink corridor have quickened by up to 20% as a result of bus priority measures, and that the scheme provided greater access to healthcare at the Queen Elizabeth University Hospital.

The route was built with a future conversion to light rail in mind, and could potentially be used in future as part of the Clyde Metro project, a proposed system of light rail, heavy metro and/or bus rapid transit for Glasgow. The preliminary routes suggest a corridor running from Glasgow Airport to the City Centre via the QEUH.

== See also ==
- List of guided busways and BRT systems in the United Kingdom
