= Ftrmetro Swansea =

Former bus rapid transit route in Swansea, Wales

ftrmetro Swansea

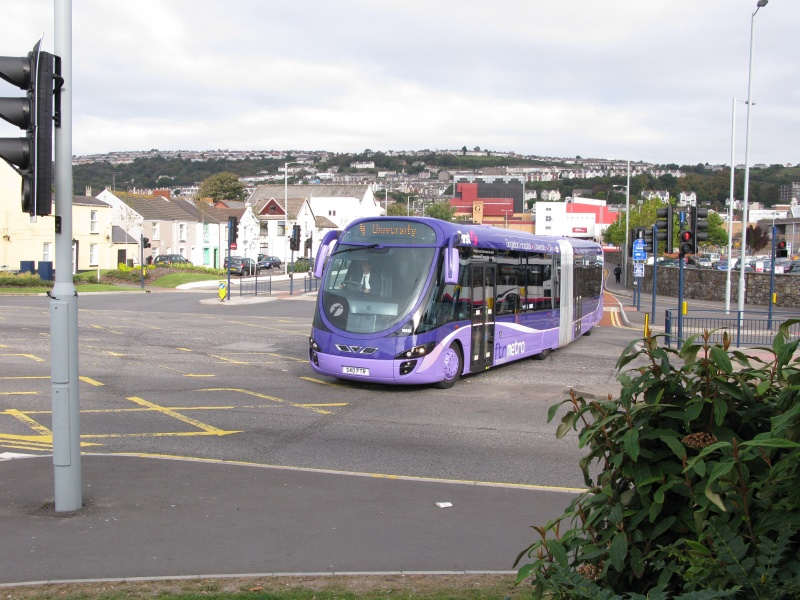
- An FTR bus travelling south from Ffordd y Gollewin towards the Civic Centre

Overview
- Locale: Swansea
- Transit type: Bus rapid transit
- Number of lines: 1
- Number of stations: 27

Operation
- Began operation: September 2009
- Operator: First Cymru
- Number of vehicles: 10

ftrmetro Swansea was a bus rapid transit route in Swansea, Wales. The route was served by FTR articulated buses in an attempt to relieve traffic congestion and provide alternative transport to cars, before they were withdrawn in 2015 in favour of smaller-capacity buses.

== Overview ==
The Welsh Assembly Government provided £2.2m in funding to help launch the scheme, and the local bus operator First Cymru paid for the fleet at a cost of £300,000 per vehicle. The buses, built by Northern Ireland-based Wrightbus, each had 37 seats. Stops were placed about every 500 m and passengers paid for tickets on-board from a conductor rather than from the driver.

The bus ran along a route from Morriston Hospital to Singleton Hospital, via Morriston, Swansea railway station, Kingsway, Swansea bus station, Civic Centre and Swansea University. The off-peak journey time between Morriston Hospital and Swansea University was timetabled to take 50 minutes.

Alterations were made to a number of roads to provide a dedicated bus lane. Orchard Street and The Kingsway were converted to a one-way streets for cars with a separate two-way bus lane. West Way was altered to accommodate a two-way bus lane and new access roads were developed near the Civic Centre. Further road developments included a bus lane along parts of Oystermouth Road and a bus bypass road past the Hafod area.

Phase 1 of the road development scheme, for Orchard Street and Kingsway, was completed. The service between Morriston Hospital and Singleton started on bus route 4, using a single ftr vehicle, on 1 June 2009 with official launch of service in September 2009.

Critics of the scheme attacked the disruption caused by roadworks to accommodate the vehicles and the impact of changes to the road network.

On 24 June 2015, First Cymru announced that it was to remove all FTR articulated buses from service on 28 August 2015, replacing them with standard single deck buses. Later in 2015, the dedicated two-way FTR bus lane on the Kingsway was removed and replaced by a standard one-way system, in response to high-profile accidents.

Subsequently, three bendy buses were brought back into use, transferring students from the main Swansea University campus on Oystermouth Road to the new Bay Campus.

== See also ==
- List of guided busways and BRT systems in the United Kingdom
- Transport in Wales
