= First York =

Bus operator in York, England

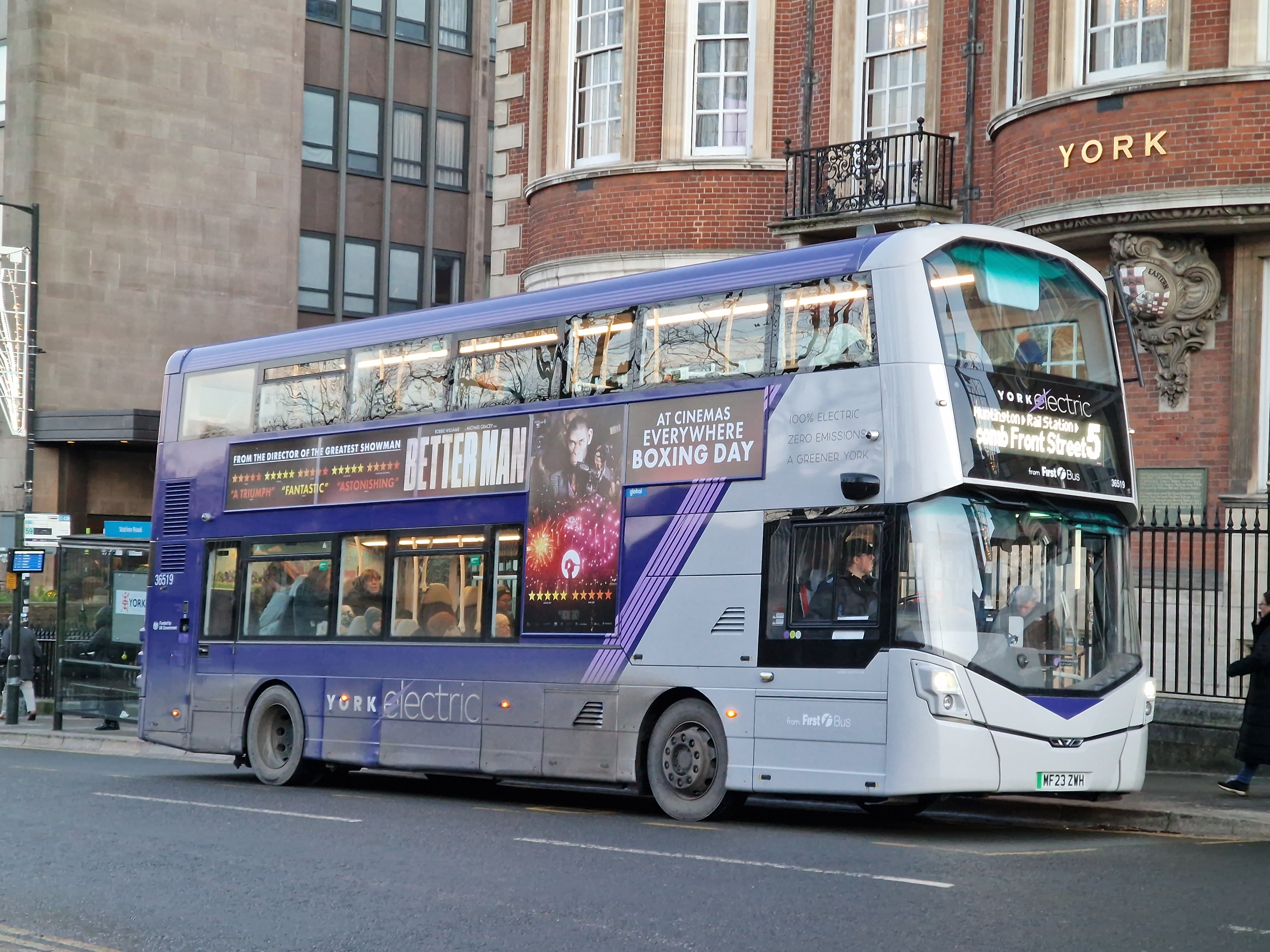
- First York Wright StreetDeck Electroliner in January 2025
- Parent: FirstGroup
- Founded: 1932; 94 years ago
- Headquarters: York, North Yorkshire; England
- Service area: North Yorkshire
- Service type: Bus and coach
- Depots: 1
- Fleet: 86 (June 2024)
- Fuel type: Battery electric
- Website: www.firstbus.co.uk/york

First York operates local bus services, with a network centring around the cathedral city of York, North Yorkshire, England. It is a subsidiary of FirstGroup, which operates bus, rail and tram services across the United Kingdom and Ireland.

== History ==
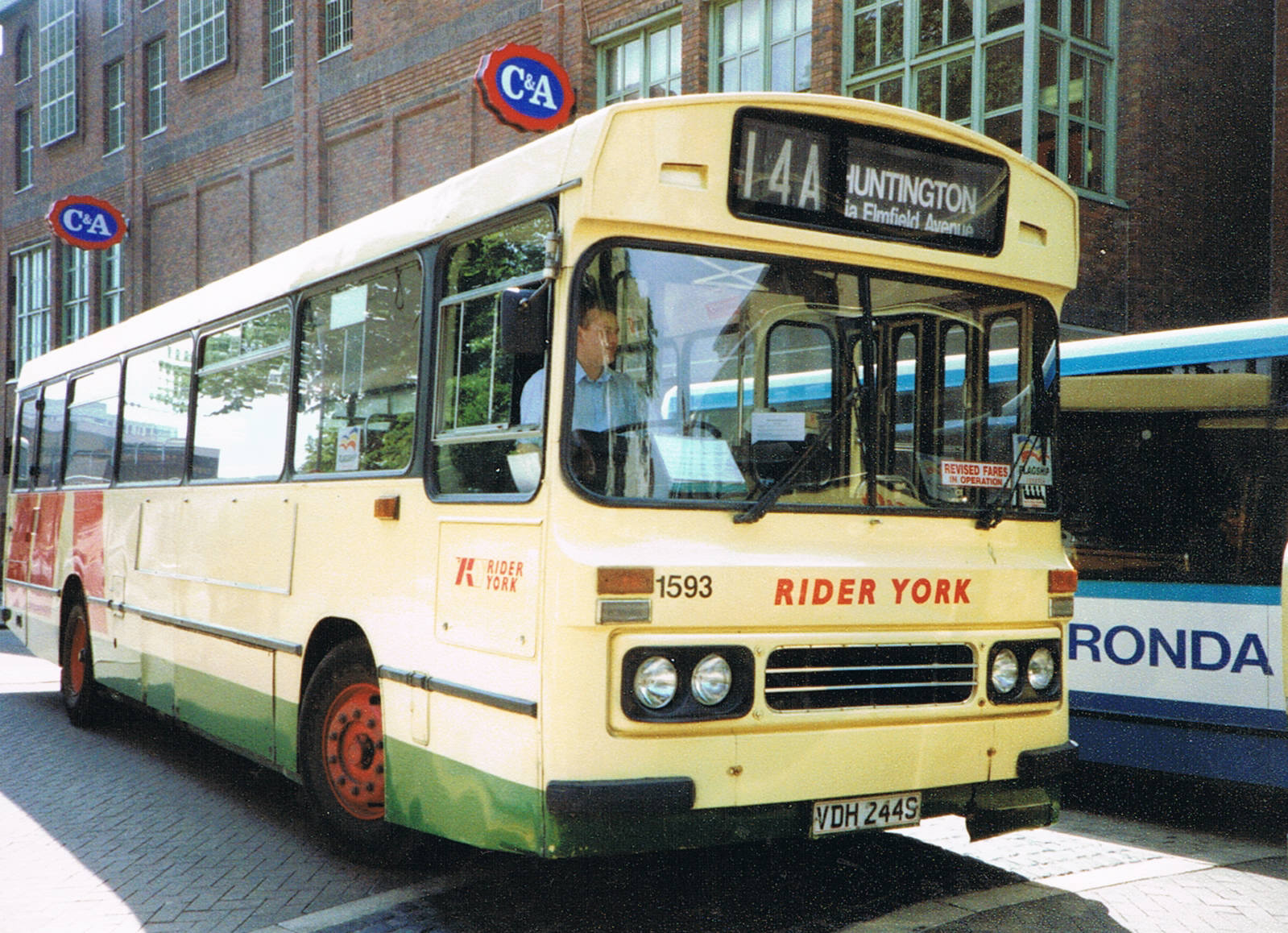
Rider York Duple Dominant bodied Leyland Leopard in 1992

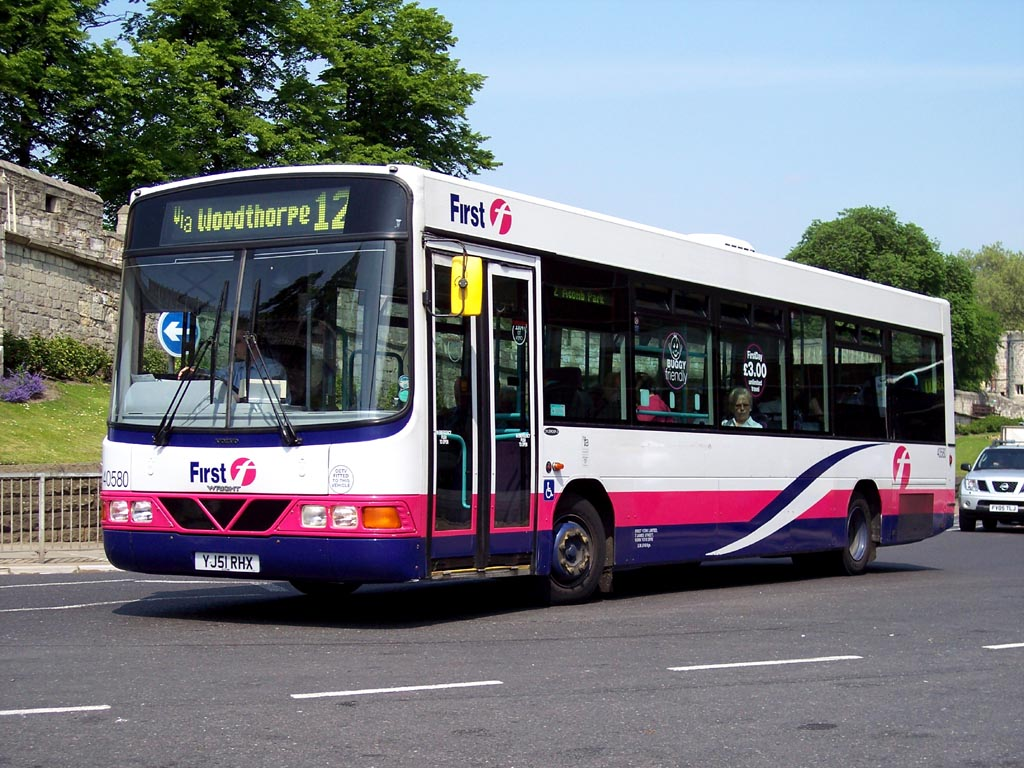
First York Wright Crusader bodied Volvo B6BLE in 2008

In 1932, the York–West Yorkshire Joint Committee was formed, as part of a joint venture between the West Yorkshire Road Car Company and City of York Council. Following the deregulation of bus services and introduction of the Transport Act 1985, such joint ventures were prohibited, with West Yorkshire Road Car taking full ownership.

In 1987, West Yorkshire Road Car Company was sold in a management buyout to the AJS Group, owned by former East Yorkshire Motor Services managing director Alan Stephenson. Operations in York were subsequently rebranded as York City & District.

In 1990, the York-based operations of AJS Group were sold to Yorkshire Rider. Four years later, Rider York was included in the sale of Yorkshire Rider to Badgerline.

In 1995, First Group was formed, following the merger of Badgerline and GRT Group. In 1998, Rider York was rebranded as First York. In the same year, First Group took ownership of Glenn Coaches, followed by York Pullman two years later.

In 2001, in advance of the launch of the York Metro bus network in September 2001, First York began a major fleet refreshment programme, taking delivery of a new low-floor fleet of 98 buses, including 12 double deckers, 53 single-deckers and 33 midibuses, replacing a majority of the company's pre-existing bus fleet.

In February 2007, the company introduced an hourly express service between York and Leeds Bradford Airport, branded York Aircoach. Initially operating with Volvo B10M coaches, the service was later revised to use single-deck buses and rebranded York Airlink. The service was withdrawn in April 2009.

In April 2009, the company launched a half-hourly express service, which ran between York and Leeds via Tadcaster and Seacroft – competing with Transdev Yorkshire Coastliner. The trial was unsuccessful and the service was subsequently withdrawn in August 2010.

In June 2014, the park and ride site at Askham Bar was expanded and relocated to a new 1,100-space site – as part of a £22 million project. In the same month, a new site was opened at Poppleton Bar, with services operated by a fleet of fully-electric Optare Versa EVs.

In August 2015, First York commenced operation of a contract to provide services on behalf of the University of York.

The operations of First York and First West Yorkshire were remerged into a First North and West Yorkshire business unit on 1 October 2022, as part of major changes to the FirstGroup's senior management, which saw the merger of First's ten regional bus operations across the United Kingdom into six business units. This business unit would later agree to purchase the operations of local independent bus and coach operator York Pullman in January 2024.

First York's James Street depot became the first in Yorkshire to operate solely using battery electric buses, as well as the first FirstGroup operation to operate a fully battery-electric fleet, in June 2024, following the delivery of 86 electric single and double-decker buses between 2015 and 2024. The electrification process began in June 2023 with the installation of 28 150 kW bus chargers, and was completed with the removal of the fuel tank, used for refuelling buses stored overnight at the depot, in June 2024 following the withdrawal of the last diesel bus at the depot.

== ftr ==
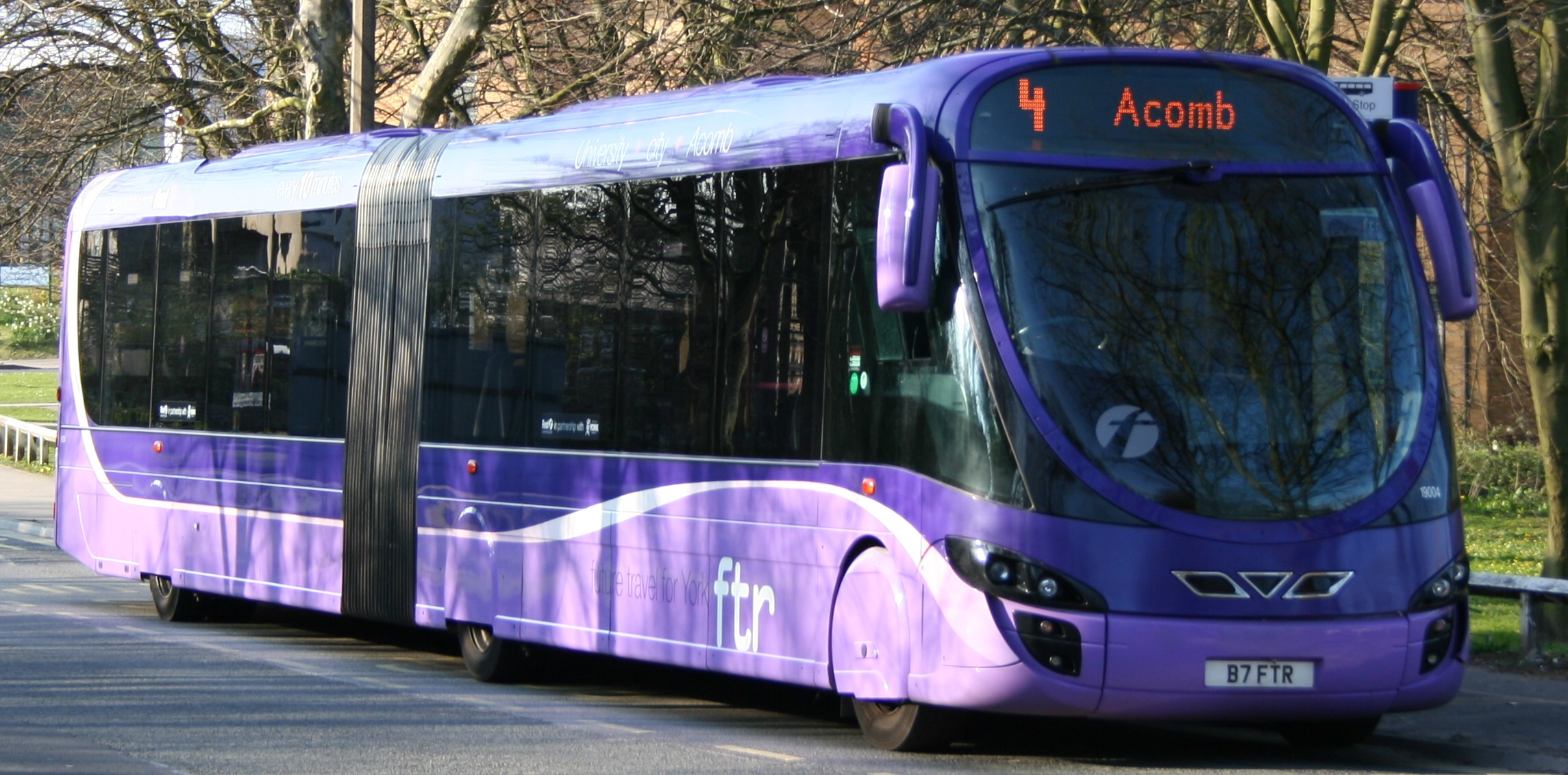
An ftr-branded articulated Wright StreetCar at University of York

In May 2006, the company took delivery of eleven articulated Wright StreetCar vehicles, branded in the two-tone purple ftr livery. They were introduced on the high-frequency 4 service, running between Acomb and University of York. The scheme was largely unpopular with people in York for a number of reasons, including frequent problems with ticketing, pricing, punctuality, and the vehicles being excessively long.

Ahead of the introduction of the trial, bus stop areas had to be extended in order to accommodate the length of the longer, articulated vehicles. However, in many cases, this led to vehicles blocking the road and further adding to traffic congestion. In May 2009, the company replaced the articulated Wright StreetCar vehicles with standard low-floor vehicles during the evening and on Sunday.

Protests were especially heated amongst students, with the University of York engaging in negotiations with the company – encouraging them to introduce discounted tickets for students. In 2010, York Pullman was awarded a contract to operate services on behalf of the University of York. Owing to competition from York Pullman, the price of tickets on First York's (now commercial) 4 service dropped significantly.

Following their victory at the 2011 local elections, the controlling Labour Party on the City of York Council set about to ensure that the articulated vehicles were replaced. In March 2012, the articulated vehicles operated in York for the last time. They were replaced by a fleet of eleven Volvo B9TL/Wright Gemini double-deck vehicles from First South Yorkshire, while the articulated vehicles were transferred to First West Yorkshire and used on a service between Bradford and Leeds via Bramley. The articulated vehicles were withdrawn entirely in July 2016.

== Park and ride ==
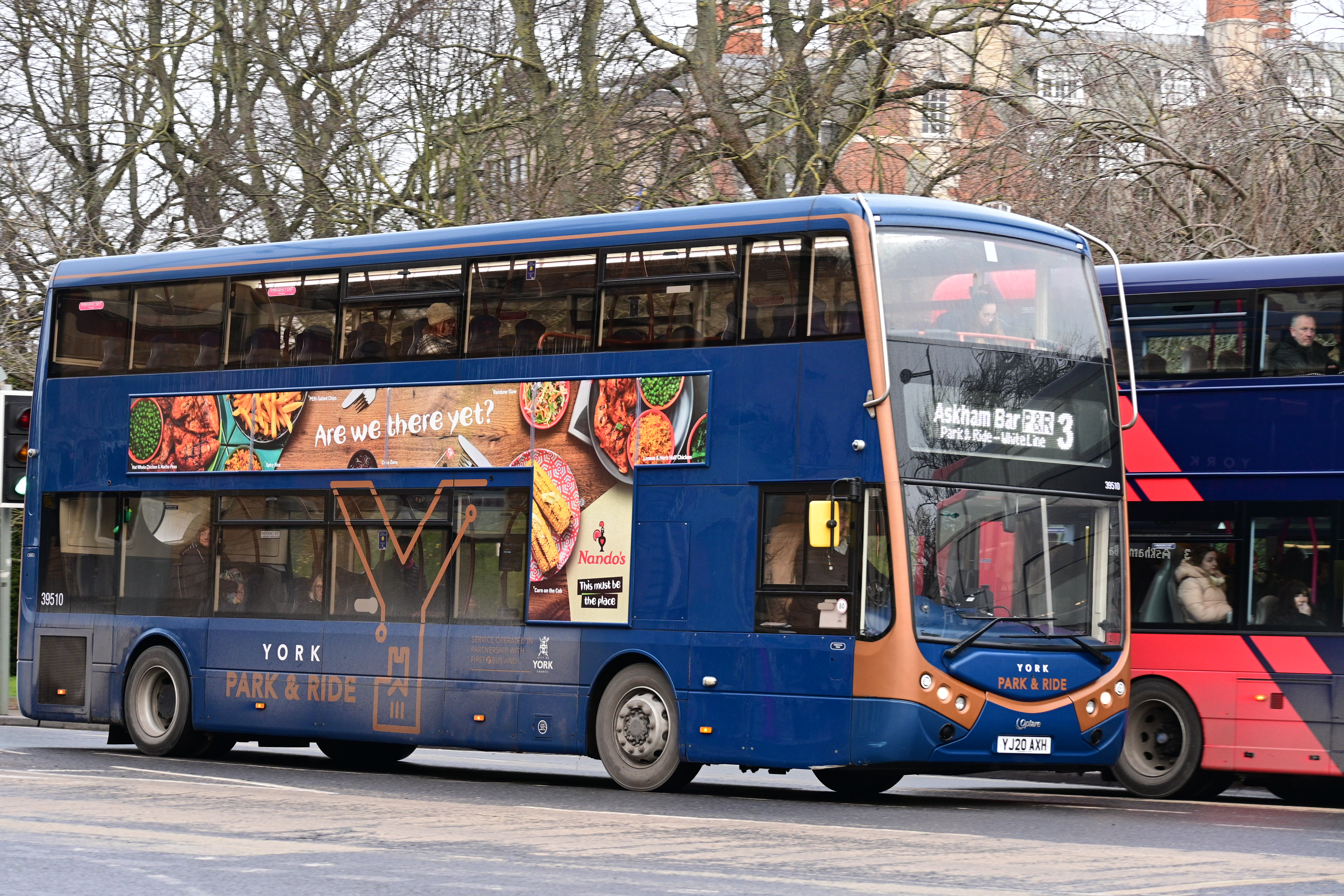
A park and ride Optare MetroDecker EV passing York railway station

In partnership with the City of York Council, the company operates a network of park and ride bus services in the city. As of May 2022, there are six sites: Askham Bar, Grimston Bar, Monks Cross, Poppleton Bar, Rawcliffe Bar and York Designer Outlet. Following the introduction of a fleet of 21 fully-electric double-deck Optare MetroDecker EV battery electric double-decker buses in July 2020, as well as a fleet of 12 Optare Versa EV midibuses introduced in 2014 and 2015, which received new drivelines by Equipmake in 2023 following a prolonged period out of service, the city boasts one of the largest zero-emission park and ride networks in the United Kingdom.

The service was formerly operated by a fleet of 17 Wright Eclipse Urban bodied Volvo B7RLEs single-deck vehicles as well as 15 articulated Mercedes-Benz Citaros, which were delivered between 2008 and 2009 to replace Wright Eclipse Metro bodied Volvo B7Ls and articulated Wright Eclipse Fusion bodied Volvo B7LAs that were introduced to the network as part of the 2001 fleet intake.

== Fleet ==
As of June 2024, the First York fleet consists of 86 battery electric buses, which are based from a single depot on James Street.

The electrification of First York's fleet was primarily achieved through the awarding of £8.4 million of Department for Transport to the City of York Council for the purchase of 44 Wrightbus electric buses. These buses, in the form of 24 Wright GB Kite single-decks and 20 Wright StreetDeck Electroliner double-decker buses, began to enter service in York from late August 2023. A further nine StreetDeck Electroliners were delivered in late 2023 for University of York bus services.
