= West Yorkshire mass transit system =

Future transport system in West Yorkshire, England

- West Yorkshire Mass Transit diagram

Overview
- Owner: West Yorkshire Combined Authority
- Area served: West Yorkshire
- Locale: Bradford, Halifax, Huddersfield, Leeds, Wakefield
- Transit type: Rapid transit Tram; Bus; Commuter rail BRT

Operation
- Operation will start: c. 2031

The West Yorkshire mass transit system is a proposed transport system connecting the larger conurbations of West Yorkshire, England, with a central hub at Leeds. Leeds is known to be the largest city in Western Europe without a light rail or metro-style system. Preparatory works are planned to start in 2028 and the system was originally scheduled to start operating in the early 2030s, but this has now has been postponed until the mid to late 2030s.

== Background ==
In the 20th century, first-generation electric tramways operated in several of the towns and cities of what is now West Yorkshire, including in Bradford, Keighley, Shipley, Halifax, Huddersfield, Dewsbury, Wakefield, and Castleford. Leeds introduced Britain's first overhead-powered electric trams in 1891; Leeds Corporation Tramways operated until 1959.

=== Earlier proposals ===
The revival of trams has been considered in the region before, mostly focusing on Leeds, where the Supertram project gained royal assent in 1993. The Supertram route was planned to proceed north from a point near to the old M621/M1 motorway junction (Note: The A1-M1 link road opened in 1999, and the original M1 was renumbered as the M621.) into central Leeds as route 1, with extensions north to Headingley, and east to the St James's Hospital area. In 2001, costings had increased to £487 million, and by the time the project was cancelled by Alistair Darling in 2004, over £39 million had been spent developing the system.

A £250 million trolleybus system was also proposed, which was cancelled in 2016.

== Development ==
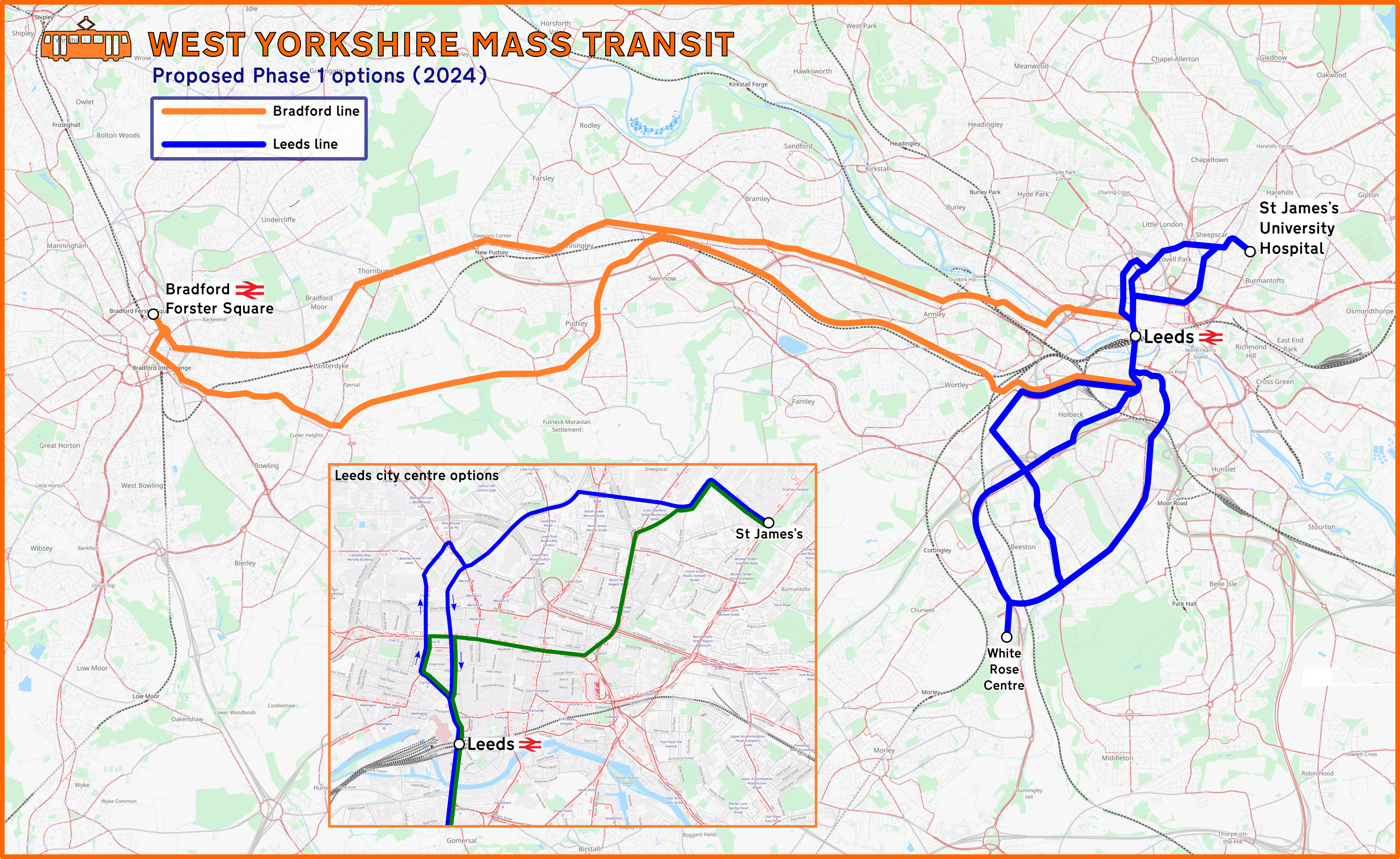
Map of phase 1 options between Leeds and Bradford and between St James's and White Rose Centre

When the Integrated Rail Plan was released in November 2021, it was revealed that the eastern leg of the HS2 project into Leeds was cancelled. Instead, a mass transit system, as proposed by the West Yorkshire Combined Authority (WYCA), was given some funding. Some have labelled this as a "consolation prize", whilst it has been noted that Leeds is the largest city in western Europe without a metro-style system. The mass transit system aims to connect 675,000 people across the West Yorkshire region.

Additionally, the Yorkshire part of the HS3 line across the Pennines was cancelled. Proponents had hoped that this would see a through line and station built in Bradford. In March 2022, the transport minister, Andrew Stephenson, said that fewer passengers travelled between Bradford and Manchester than between Bradford and other parts of West Yorkshire, so the government favoured a mass transit system and route upgrades, rather than building a new line.

=== Funding and planning ===
In March 2022, £200 million was approved to take the project forward, one tenth of its estimated cost of £2 billion. However, this £200 million of funding may be halved as £100 million may be allocated to investigate whether HS2 trains could travel to Leeds on conventional railway tracks. In September 2022 a new study, called "The Leeds Study", was launched to look at the integrated rail plan of West Yorkshire, with a focus on capacity at Leeds railway station, and the development of the mass transit system.

On 7 March 2024, West Yorkshire Combined Authority published the strategic outline case for the project. The first phase proposes a Leeds Line running from St James's Hospital to White Rose Shopping Centre, and a Bradford Line running from Leeds to a new Bradford railway station. A future case for connecting Leeds to Dewsbury will be consulted on separately via a £1 million Dewsbury Line Development Project fund. One week later, WYCA approved the strategic outline case and was to submit it to the Department of Transport for approval to continue with development of the scheme. A public consultation on the exact routes of phase one was scheduled for summer 2024.

On 15 July 2024 initial route options for both lines were revealed, ahead of an 11-week consultation. A final decision on precise routing is expected to be made in 2025. Public consultation in 2025 showed favourable outcome for three lines, with the highest support for the line to Leeds Beckett University.

=== Construction ===
Construction of phase 1 (the Bradford to Leeds and St James's to White Rose lines) is expected to start in 2028, with the first services starting in 2031, and the whole system completed by 2040.
