= Leeds Supertram =

Cancelled transit system in Leeds, England

- A 2001 artist's impression of Supertram in City Square

Overview
- Locale: Leeds
- Transit type: Electrified tramway
- Number of lines: 3
- Number of stations: 50

Operation
- Operator: West Yorkshire Metro

Technical
- System length: 28 km (17 mi)
- Track gauge: 1,435 mm (4 ft 8 1/2 in) standard gauge
Proposed system map
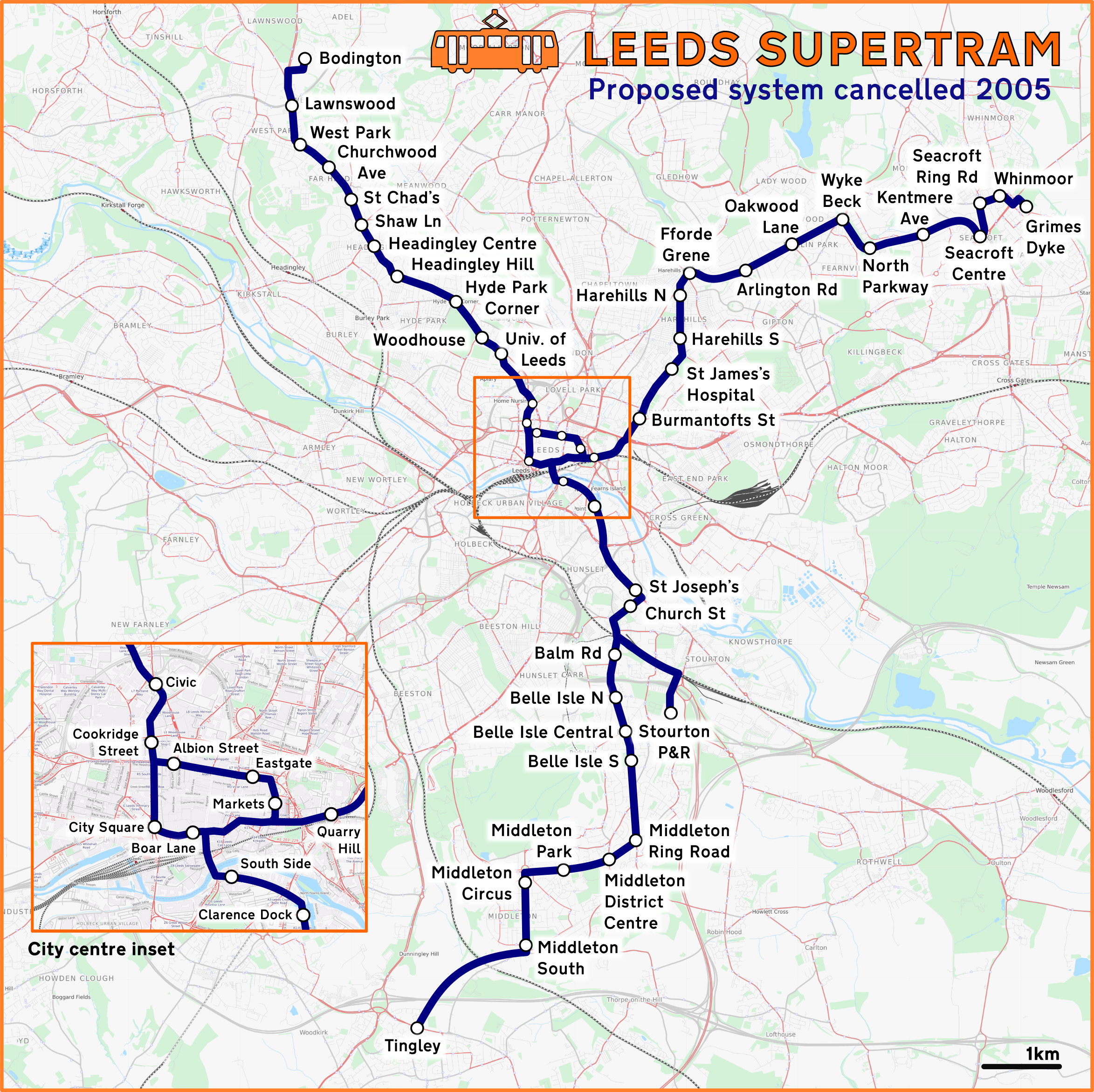
(Click to expand)

The Leeds Supertram was a proposed light rail/tram system in Leeds and West Yorkshire in England. It would have been a three-line, 17-mile (27 km) system with 50 stations. It received provisional government approval in 2001, and was specifically for corridors ill-served by the existing heavy rail network. Supertram would have been 75% funded from the public sector, with final contracts for construction and a 27-year operating concession due to have been awarded in 2003. By 2004, disquiet about rising costs had caused the scheme to be scaled back, and it was finally cancelled in 2005 by the Transport Secretary, Alistair Darling.

The northern branch would have served the universities and Headingley, running to a park and ride site at Lawnswood. The eastern branch would have run to Seacroft and Whinmoor, and the southern arm would have served Hunslet, Belle Isle and Middleton with another park and ride by the M621 motorway. In the city centre, trams were to have linked to the bus and rail stations and shopping areas. Most of the double track route would have been segregated.

== Proposals ==
Leeds Supertram Act 1993
- Act of Parliament
- Parliament of the United Kingdom
- Long title: An Act to empower the West Yorkshire Passenger Transport Executive in conjunction with the Leeds City Council to develop and operate a light rail or supertram system of passenger transport in the City of Leeds; to authorise the construction of works; to confer powers upon the Executive and the City Council for the acquisition of lands for that purpose; and for other purposes.
- Citation: 1993 c. xv

Dates
- Royal assent: 27 July 1993

Status: Current legislation

Text of statute as originally enacted

Proposals for the reinstatement of trams or a light rail system in Leeds which were withdrawn in 1959 have been ongoing since the 1970s with various plans for varying light rail systems including ones which had planned partially or fully underground routes in the city centre. The cancelled plans mentioned in this article had dated back to the early 1990s.

=== Route ===
The planned system included three lines, which were to have been:

- Line 1 (South Line), to Stourton and Tingley via Hunslet, Belle Isle and Middleton
- Line 2 (North Line), to Weetwood via the University of Leeds, Hyde Park and Headingley
- Line 3 (East Line), to Whinmoor via St James's Hospital, Harehills and Seacroft

All three lines would have met in Leeds city centre in a loop line running along The Headrow, Park Row, Boar Lane, Kirkgate and behind Kirkgate Market.

The three lines were to have been the start of a wider system which included plans for other tram lines from Leeds city centre to Bradford via Armley, Bramley and Stanningley and to Alwoodley via Chapeltown, Chapel Allerton and Moortown (the latter being mentioned in the draft Leeds Unitary Development Plan).

== Funding delays ==
Following long standing delays in attempting to gain funding throughout the 1990s due to rejections by the previous John Major administration, in 2002 Leeds was successful in acquiring central government funding for the construction of the scheme. Four consortia were shortlisted:

- Airelink: (Arriva, Siemens, Amec, Transdev)
- Leeds Tramways: (Stagecoach, Mowlem, WS Atkins)
- Leeds Tram Link: (Amey, Bechtel, MTR, Egis)
- Momentis: (FirstGroup, Bombardier, Bouygues, Jarvis)

Preparation work on Leeds Supertram had started in 2003 where preparatory work was done at City Square and around the junction of the A61 South Accommodation Road and A639 Hunslet Road.

== Project suspension and cancellation ==
However, work to construct the system that was due to start in earnest in 2004 was suspended because of costs that were originally £500 million had risen far above this level to figures around £1 billion. This had resulted in a cut back to the system that would have seen Line 1 only go from the city centre to the park and ride site at Stourton and this would have saved £250 million from the construction of the scheme and efforts were made to lower development costs along the other planned routes. However despite this in late 2005, Transport Minister Alistair Darling said that he would not give the go-ahead for the scheme, despite £40 million having already been spent into the development of the scheme.

Kieran Preston, the Director General of West Yorkshire Metro at the time of the Supertram project, claimed in 2013 that money could have been saved by finding new solutions to engineering problems, and by postponing a 4.3-mile (6.9 km) stretch of the southern line so that it would only run from Leeds city centre to Stourton park and ride. Preston said that the business case for Leeds Supertram was stronger than those for Nottingham or Manchester, but that the Labour government had spent the transport budget on railways and distorted the figures to say that Leeds could not afford it.

== Proposed alternatives ==
=== Trolleybus ===
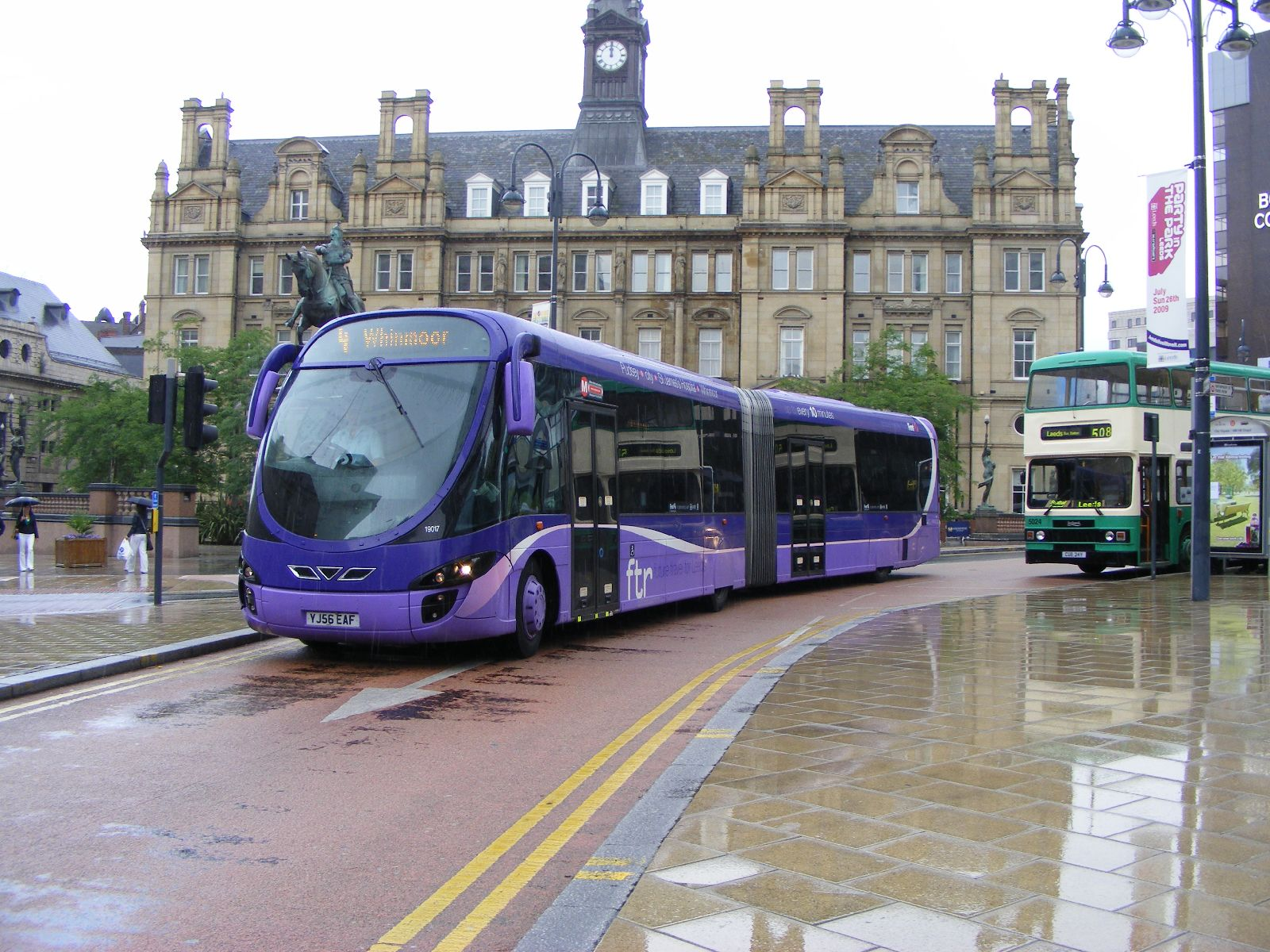
An FTR Wright StreetCar in Leeds city centre, 2009

Alternatives for the future of transport in Leeds have been discussed. The FTR, a Bus Rapid Transport (BRT) system operated by First West Yorkshire, was introduced to the city in 2007. Research undertaken by West Yorkshire Metro and the government claimed that a BRT network could deliver some of the benefits of Supertram with lower capital costs due to unsegregated routes and greater flexibility, but with a higher long-term cost due to shorter life expectancy of rolling stock. The Leeds FTR service initially served the boroughs of Pudsey and Seacroft until the Wright StreetCars were redeployed and refurbished in 2012 to operate on the Leeds-Bradford bus corridor.

Another possibility investigated by Metro is a tram-train system. On such a system trams are capable of running onto mainline railways as well as on tracks built in city centres. A 2007 feasibility study proposed that the network would run alongside First's FTR network and could potentially be extended to Leeds Bradford Airport and York.

A trolleybus network was approved by the government in 2012, which would have connected Leeds city centre to two park and ride sites in the north and south of the city by 2018. £173 million would have been made available from the Department for Transport for the construction of the network. The plans were subject to further scrutiny by the government, however they were eventually dropped in 2016. By the time of the network's cancellation, £70 million had been spent on both the trolleybus and Supertram networks.

=== New tram proposal ===
Prior to the cancellation of the eastern leg of HS2 in November 2021, reports emerged in the Daily Mail that the government would fund the construction of a tram network in Leeds as "consolation" for the cancelled high-speed rail link. Leeds City Council criticised the proposals as being insufficient to replace the regional and national connections that would have been provided by HS2. Earlier in January 2021, the West Yorkshire Combined Authority had revealed plans to develop a mass transit network, with options of light rail, tram-trains or a BRT system being considered across West Yorkshire. The government commitment was restated in a party conference speech in 2023, this time as consolation for the cancelled Phase 2b to Manchester.

On 7 March 2024, the West Yorkshire Combined Authority announced plans to build a tram line connecting Leeds and Bradford in several phases. Phase one would include two lines serving Leeds and Bradford, the Leeds Line and the Bradford Line. The Leeds Line would take people between St James’ Hospital, through Leeds city centre and on to Elland Road and the White Rose Shopping Centre. The Bradford Line would run from Leeds city centre to Bradford city centre – also linking Bradford Forster Square station with the new Bradford rail station. This line supports Bradford's plans to regenerate the city’s southern gateway, which includes the new Bradford rail station. The Combined Authority would also work with Kirklees Council to look into how to include a Dewsbury Line in future.
