= First West Yorkshire =

Bus operator in West Yorkshire, England

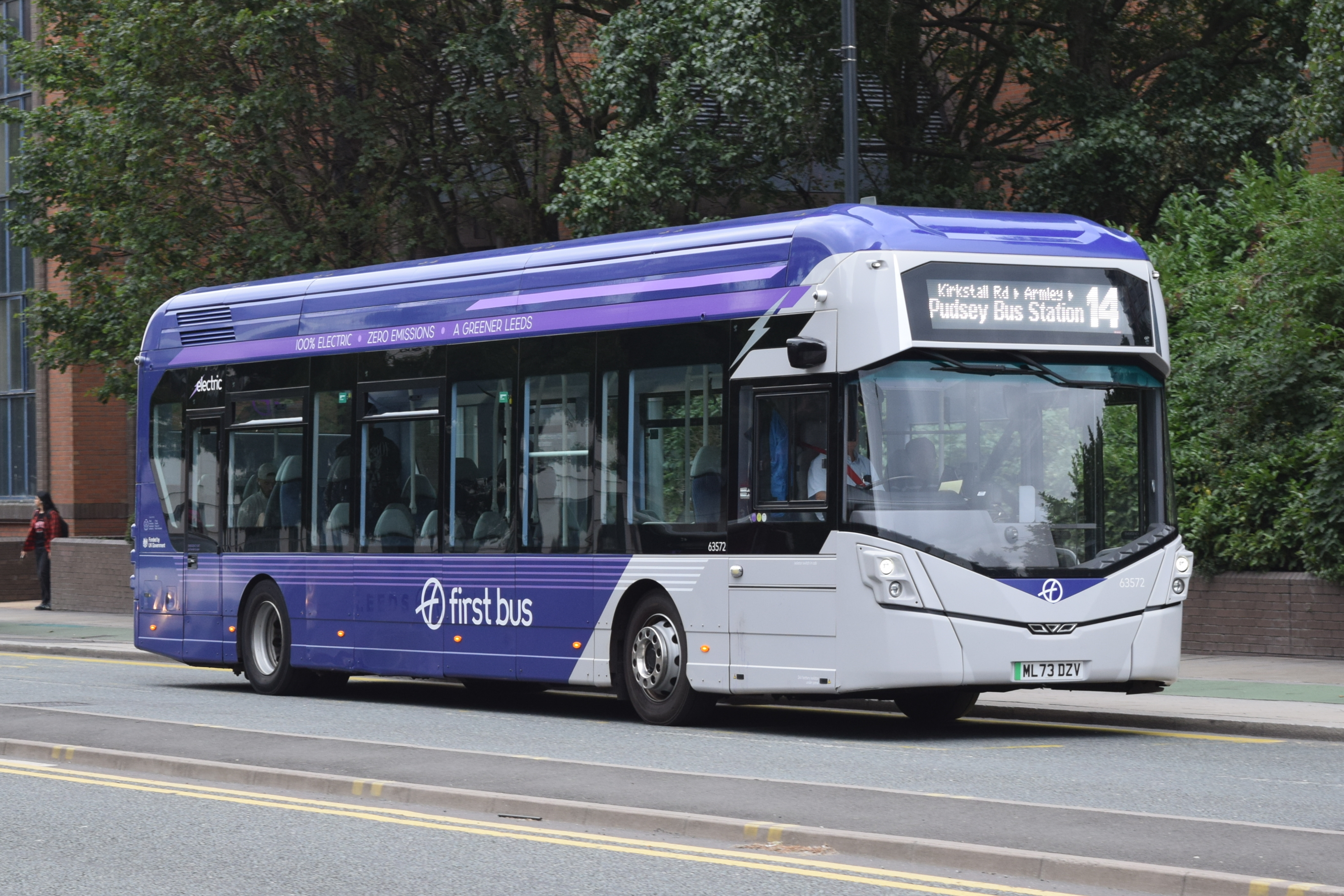
- First West Yorkshire Wright GB Kite Electroliner in Leeds in August 2025
- Parent: FirstGroup
- Founded: February 1998; 28 years ago
- Headquarters: Hunslet, Leeds, West Yorkshire; England
- Service area: West Yorkshire
- Service type: Bus services
- Depots: 5
- Fleet: 620+ (November 2026)
- Managing Director: Paul Matthews
- Website: First Bradford; First Halifax, Calder Valley & Huddersfield; First Leeds

First West Yorkshire operates both local and regional bus services in West Yorkshire, England. It is a subsidiary of the FirstGroup, and is made up of three sub-division brands: First Bradford, First Halifax, Calder Valley & Huddersfield and First Leeds.

== History ==
In April 1974, the West Yorkshire Passenger Transport Executive was formed, with the municipal fleets of Bradford, Calderdale, Halifax, Huddersfield and Leeds combined. Services were branded under the MetroBus brand, with a cream and verona green livery adopted.

To comply with the Transport Act 1985, the West Yorkshire Passenger Transport Executive formed an arms length company named Yorkshire Rider in September 1986. West Yorkshire PTE's 'Metrobus' services were transferred to Yorkshire Rider upon the deregulation of West Yorkshire bus services on 26 October 1986.

On 21 October 1988, Yorkshire Rider was privatised for £20 million (equivalent to £59,737,000 in 2025), with 51% of shares in the company being sold by West Yorkshire PTE to a team of eight managers in a management buyout and the remaining 49% sold to Yorkshire Rider's 3,500 employees in an Employee Share Ownership Plan, the largest ESOP arrangement in the United Kingdom at the time.

In August 1989, Yorkshire Rider purchased the West Yorkshire Road Car Company, a former National Bus Company subsidiary who operated services in Bradford, Leeds and Otley, from AJS Holdings. The 'West Yorkshire' trading name was retained by Yorkshire Rider for nearly a year following the takeover, after which it was removed in a restructuring of former WYRCC operations.

=== FirstGroup ownership ===
On 15 April 1994, Yorkshire Rider was purchased by the Badgerline Group for £38 million (equivalent to £80,179,000 in 2025). Badgerline and its subsidiaries were later merged with the GRT Group in April 1995 to form the FirstGroup.

In September 1995, Yorkshire Rider was split into four separate divisions: Bradford Traveller, Calderline, Kingfisher Huddersfield and Leeds City Link. However in February 1998, all these were respectively renamed First Bradford, First Calderdale, First Huddersfield and First Leeds as part of the rollout of a unified FirstBus brand.

During the early 2000s, several regional divisions were merged. First Quickstep were based at the same Kirkstall Road depot as First Leeds but as a separate entity running several services around the Leeds area until it was merged into First Leeds' operation, while First Calderdale and First Huddersfield merged in 2003 to form First Calderdale & Huddersfield.

In July 2005, First Leeds purchased Morley-based Black Prince Buses. The family-run independent's last buses left service on 31 July, with First taking on most of Black Prince's services from 1 August.

On 18 May 2008, the company's Kirkstall Road depot, first opened in 1897 as a Leeds Corporation Tramways depot and tramcar workshop, was closed after 111 years of service. Staff and operations were subsequently moved to a new depot at Hunslet, situated next door to the site of another former tram depot. Named Hunslet Park, the new depot was opened with a capacity of 200 buses with room for additional expansion.

In 2009, the management of the three FirstGroup sub-divisions in West Yorkshire, as well as First York were centralised, creating First West Yorkshire.

First's Todmorden outstation was partially demolished in 2015, converting the site into an open-air yard housing 24 vehicles.

The operations of First West Yorkshire and First York are to be remerged into a First North and West Yorkshire business unit on 1 October 2022, with current Managing Director Paul Matthews temporarily overseeing operations of the new business unit until a new Managing Director can be recruited. This is part of major changes to the FirstGroup's senior management, which will see the merger of First's ten regional bus operations across the United Kingdom into six business units.

In preparation for the rollout of Weaver Network bus franchising across the company's operating area, in November 2026, First West Yorkshire sold its five depots and up to 330 vehicles from their fleet, including 79 battery electric buses, to the West Yorkshire Combined Authority (WYCA).

== Operations ==
As of November 2026, excluding First York, the company operates from five depots in the region: Bradford, Bramley, Halifax, Huddersfield and Hunslet. The company also maintains an open-air outstation in Todmorden.

=== Leeds ===
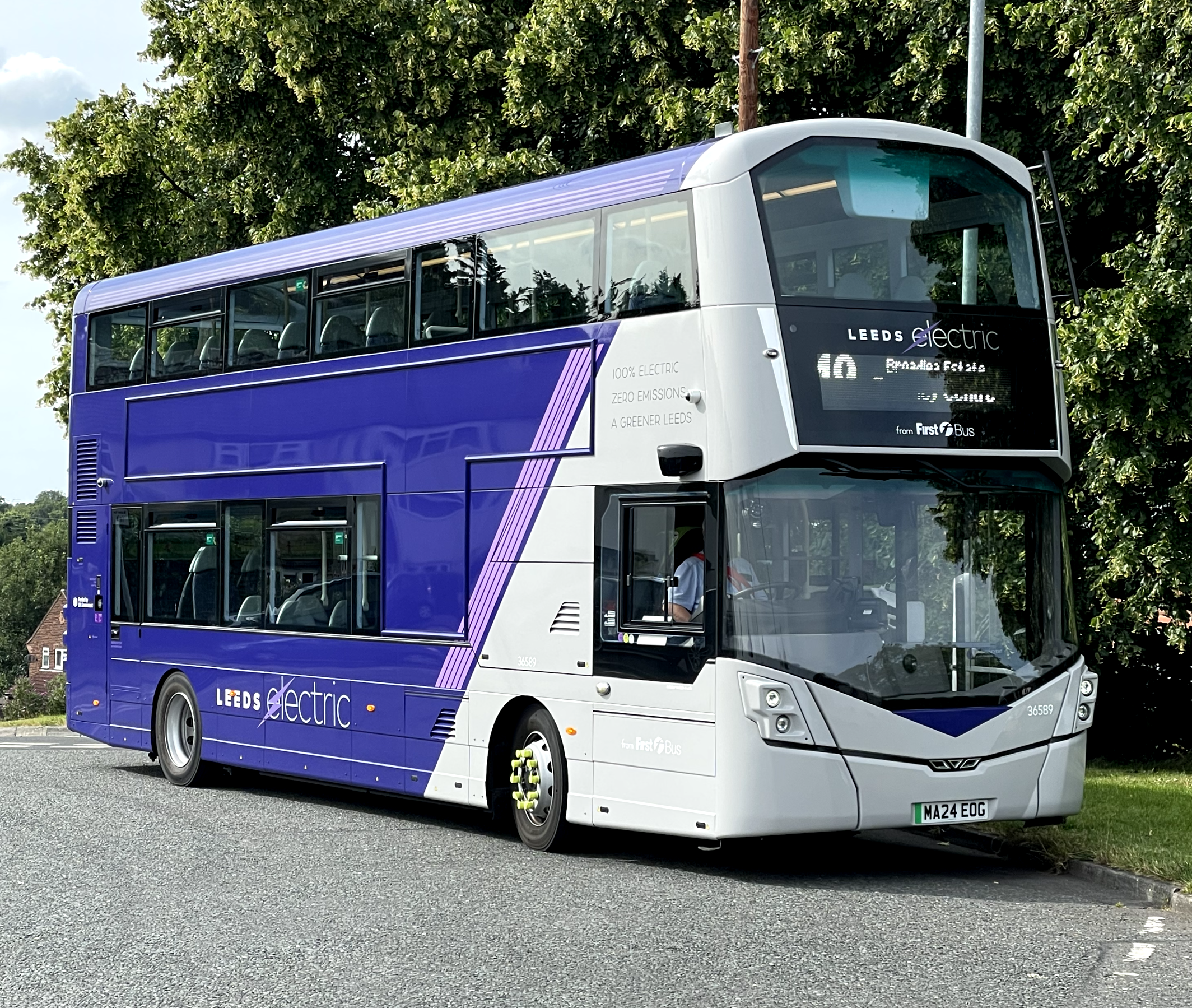
Leeds Electric Wright StreetDeck Electroliner in Monkswood Gate in July 2024

First Leeds operate buses in the city of Leeds and surrounding areas from both Bramley and Hunslet depots, the latter replacing the former Kirkstall Road site in 2008 and Cherry Row depot in 2009.

First Leeds's services were rebranded to LeedsCity in early 2018, with First's standard fleet livery replaced with a predominantly green livery, of which was first applied to over 120 new Wright StreetDecks delivered between 2018 and 2022. Between 2019 and 2024, it was also rolled out to pre-existing fleet vehicles. In 2020, nine Yutong E10s, the first zero-emissions buses in West Yorkshire, entered service. This was followed by StreetDeck and GB Kite Electroliner battery electric buses produced by Wrightbus, arriving from 2024. These did not come in LeedsCity Green livery and instead painted into the new Ultraviolet livery with Leeds Electric skylines added. Pre-existing fleet vehicles that are not electric at both Bramley and Hunslet depots are also in the process of receiving this new grey-fronted purple livery minus the Leeds Electric branding.

In partnership with Leeds City Council and West Yorkshire Combined Authority, First Leeds also operates a network of park and ride bus services in the city. As of September 2021, there are three sites at Elland Road, Temple Green and Stourton, numbered PR1-3 respectively. The network first went into operation in June 2014 with the early opening of the Elland Road site for the Grand Départ of the 2014 Tour de France, followed by a full opening later that month. A second site at Temple Green was opened in 2017, and a third site powered by self-sustainable solar panels was opened in Stourton in 2021. The network is currently operated by a fleet of hybrid electric Wright StreetDeck HEV and fully electric BYD Alexander Dennis Enviro400EV double-deck vehicles branded in dedicated liveries.

=== Bradford ===
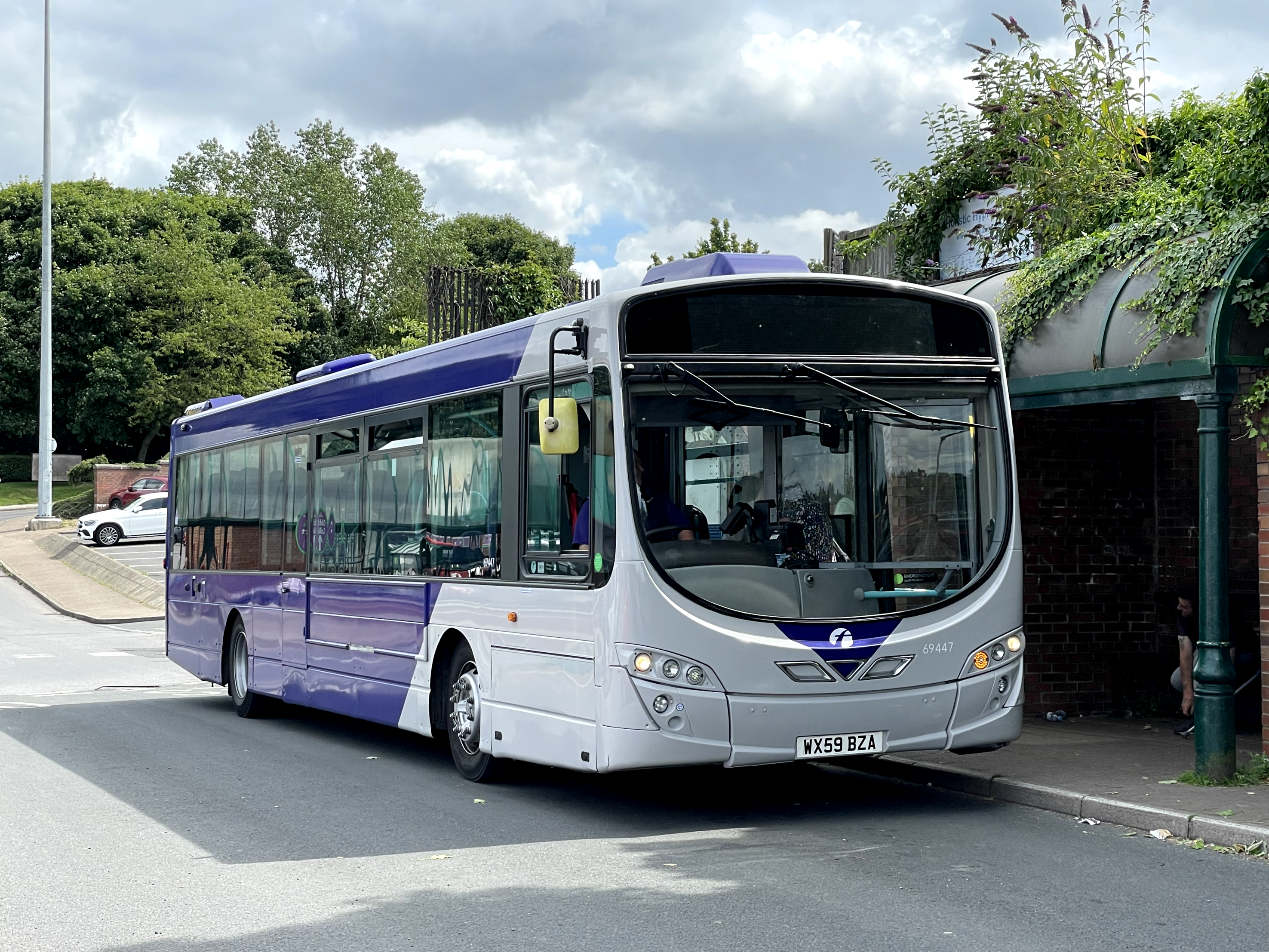
First Bradford Wright Eclipse 2 bodied Volvo B7RLE in 5 Lane Ends in July 2024

First Bradford operate buses in Bradford and surrounding areas.

Bradford's flagship services are the Leeds to Bradford 72 and express X6 services, which run via Bowling Back Lane depot. However, the 72 route was run by Bramley depot until late 2018 where operations transferred over to Back Bowling Lane depot in Bradford. In 2012, refurbished former ftr Wright StreetCar articulated buses operated route 72. These were withdrawn in July 2016 and replaced by a fleet of double-deck Wright StreetDeck vehicles delivered in both Olympia for route 72 and the distinctive Olympia-Express livery the X6.

In March 2022, ahead of the start of Bradford's Clean Air Zone later that year, First Bradford launched the City of Bradford branding, which was first applied to 28 new Wright StreetDeck Ultroliners delivered for service on the X6, 72 and X11, replacing older 2016 and 2017 StreetDecks and StreetDeck Micro Hybrids. This was followed by 11 new City of Bradford-branded Wright StreetLite Max Ultroliners entering service in the summer, whilst some pre-existing fleet vehicles based at Bradford Bowling Back Lane depot were painted in the 2-tone blue livery. Like with First Leeds, the City of Bradford livery is dropped in favour of the new Ultraviolet scheme.

=== Halifax, Calder Valley & Huddersfield ===
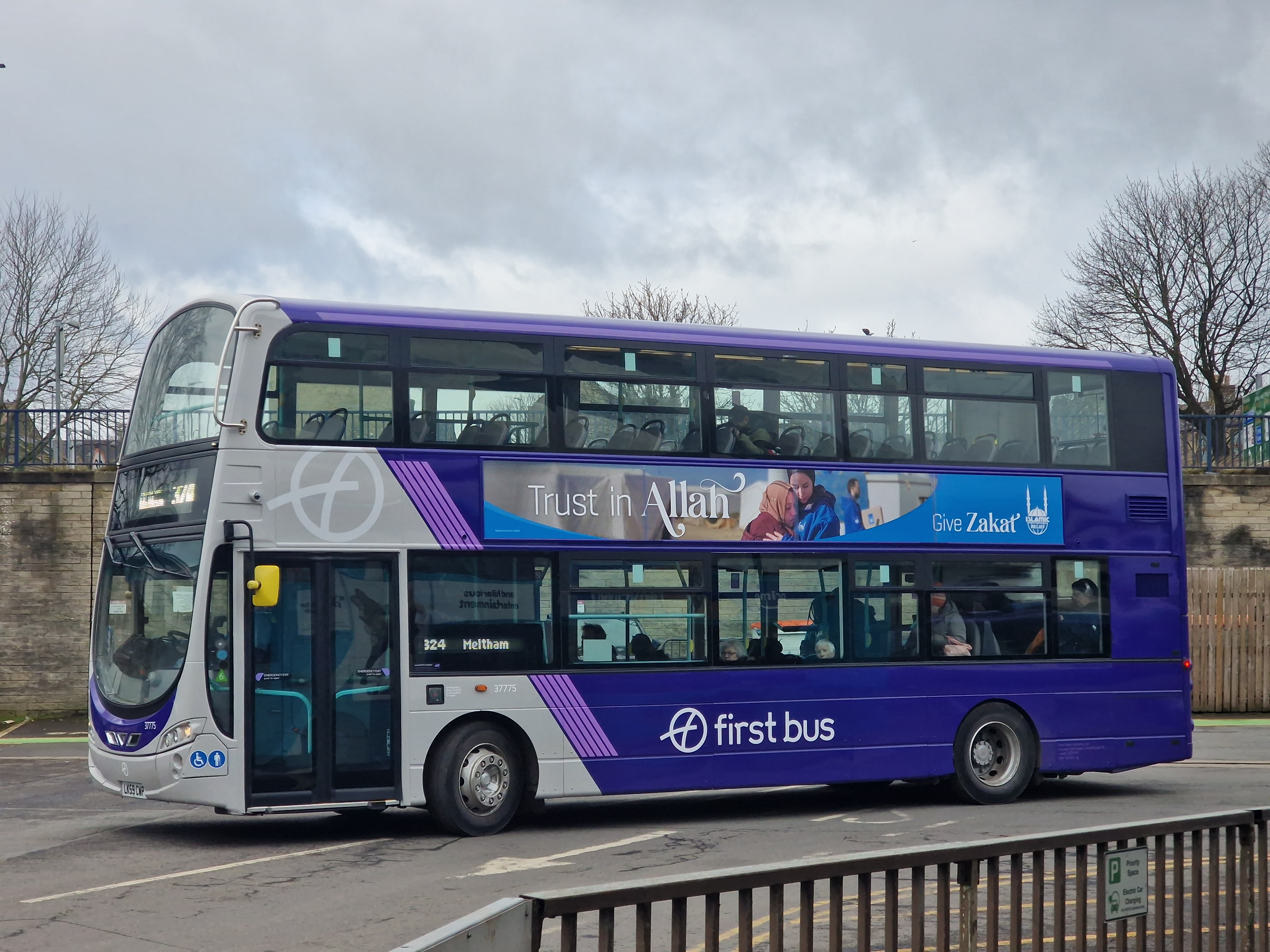
Wright Eclipse Gemini 2 bodied Volvo B9TL at Huddersfield bus station in February 2025

First Halifax, Calder Valley & Huddersfield is an amalgamation of the First Halifax and First Huddersfield operations, running services in their respective towns as well as the Calder Valley region.

Until recently, some buses in Halifax and Huddersfield were branded for the Holme Valley Connection, Calder Connect, Red Arrow and Zest networks respectively, with refurbished buses receiving free WiFi and an improvement in bus frequency. In 2018, the HD Connect network was launched in Huddersfield, with buses for services 370, 371 and 372 receiving new blue-front branding, live service tracking and ticket machines with contactless payment. The HD Connect network has expanded on these services since. First Halifax initially opted for the HX Connect livery, with a darker blue front, but it was soon discontinued and replaced by the Olympia-Urban livery, otherwise known as 'hybrid-Olympia'.

In April 2023, the 184 service, previously run by First Greater Manchester from Oldham to Grotton and Huddersfield was transferred to First Huddersfield, now running from Huddersfield to Marsden Hard End and Oldham to replace the 183 bus service. This service is now operated by Stagecoach Manchester due to Tranche 2 of Bee Network bus franchising. This was also due to the West Yorkshire Combined Authority and West Yorkshire Metro reducing funding in the service.

Service changes at the start of 2024, meant renumbering bus routes in First Halifax, Calder Valley and Huddersfield, including the 503 which was renumbered to 501 with an additional express service launched, X1. As a result, First Halifax decided to route-brand some of their existing fleet vehicles with Elland Lines to represent the Halifax/Huddersfield corridor. Like with First Leeds and Bradford, HD Connect and the Olympia-Urban livery has been dropped in favour of the new Ultraviolet livery, with the pre-existing fleet already starting to wear this new livery.

== Fleet ==
As of November 2026, the First West Yorkshire fleet consisted of over 620 buses.

=== FTR and Hyperlink ===
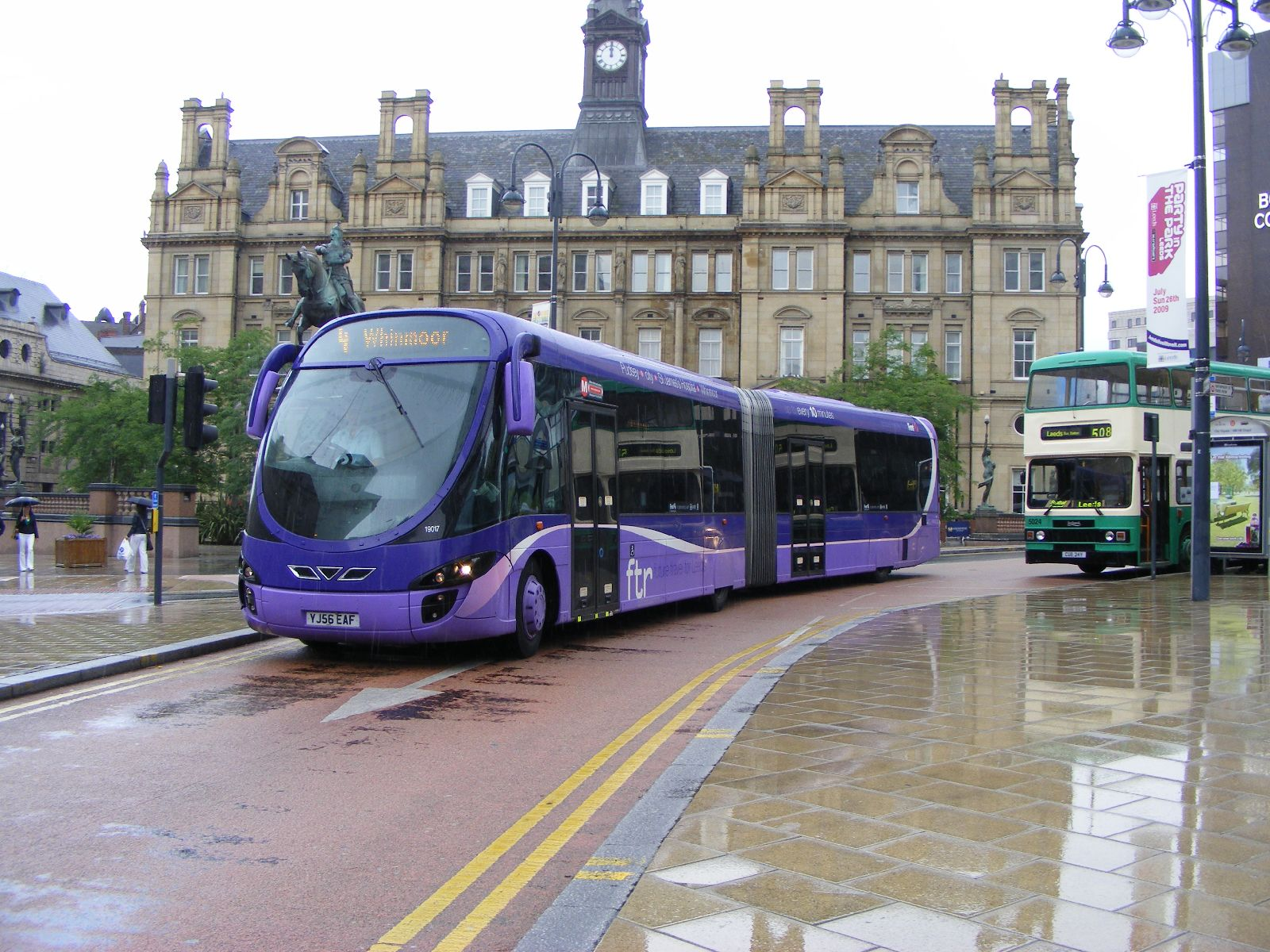
An FTR Wright StreetCar in Leeds city centre, 2009

In 2006, following the introduction of the service in York, which had been beset by problems, Leeds was chosen to be the second First operation to launch an FTR (stylised ftr) service. 17 articulated Wright StreetCars were initially acquired for the service, which was officially launched in August 2007 following the alteration of bus lanes, road layouts and the construction of raised kerbs at bus stops. The FTR StreetCars operated on the 4 service serving Pudsey, central Leeds and Seacroft until 2012, when they were redeployed and refurbished alongside ex-York StreetCars to operate on the Leeds-Bradford Hyperlink route 72; these were finally withdrawn in 2016 and replaced with StreetDecks.
