= FTR (bus) =

British bus rapid transit system, 2006–2023

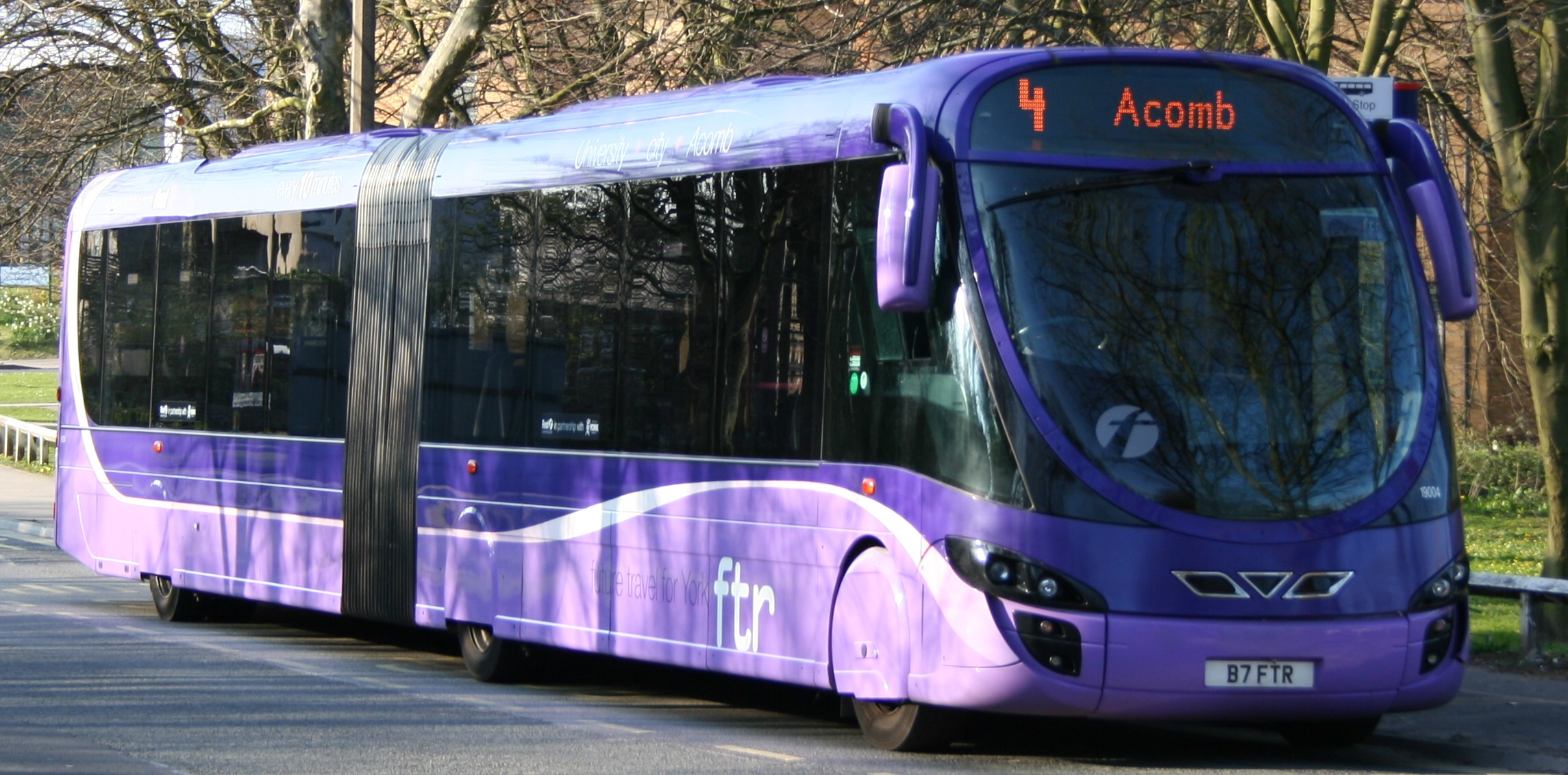
- A First York FTR Wright StreetCar in York on route 4
- Parent: FirstGroup
- Founded: 2006
- Headquarters: Aberdeen, Scotland
- Service area: York 2006–2012; Leeds 2007–2016; Swansea 2009–2015; Luton 2008–2023
- Service type: Bus rapid transit
- Fuel type: Diesel
- Operator: First Cymru; First Northampton; First West Yorkshire; First York

FTR was a British bus rapid transit system formerly operated in Leeds, Luton, Swansea and York. FirstGroup introduced the system, using 39 Wright StreetCar articulated buses in conjunction with infrastructure upgrades by local authorities. The vehicles were branded as "the future of travel", the operators claiming that ftr is Abjadic textspeak for the word future.

== Elements ==
The FTR concept was made up of a bundle of simultaneously introduced innovations relating to the vehicle type, its configuration, the fare collection arrangements, consequent changes to infrastructure, and an integrated data-handling system for voice radio, vehicle location, real-time passenger information, on-board displays, vehicle diagnostics, and ticket machine data.

=== Vehicles ===
Each 'StreetCar' vehicle had a separate driver (or "pilot") compartment, resembling to some extent similar designs in continental Europe. Otherwise the vehicle itself was a modified conventional bus on Volvo B7LA chassis, with styling similar to contemporary trams and trolleybuses and a greater distance between axles to maximise the low-floor area for easily accessible seating. The vehicles were air-conditioned and had tinted windows to enhance the on-board ambience along with ergonomic seating.

The FTR StreetCars were the first Wrightbus vehicles to use the new Wrightbus Telematics System (WTS) developed jointly by Wrightbus, Advanced Communications and Information Systems and smart payment specialists Mobimatics. All on-board information, vehicle tracking and payment systems aboard the buses were ran via a core 'black box' system within the WTS, which in York, was connected to the city's real-time passenger information and traffic signal priority systems, allowing the capability for late-running FTR buses to request priority at traffic lights. On-board "infotainment" screens displayed the next stop along a route (in a similar fashion to Transport for London's then-new iBus system), information related to that stop including local attractions/facilities and connecting bus/train routes, and advertisements for local businesses.

=== Ticketing system ===
A major difference between FTR and conventional bus services was the method of fare collection, as the design of Wright StreetCar allowed no contact between driver and passengers. In York, this initially involved purchase of cash fares from either 50 PayPoints located at newsagents, convenience stores or supermarkets across the city, or self-service tickets machine at real-time information boards across the city or aboard the bus; shortly after the launch of services, a website was launched that sent a text message with a barcode to the passenger's mobile phone. This was intended to reduce time spent taking on passengers, with passengers encouraged to pay before boarding similar to articulated buses in London, however problems with the ticketing machines resulted in their withdrawal and the introduction of conductors (or "customer hosts"). On the Leeds FTR system, all passengers bought tickets from, or showed bus passes and permits to, the conductor.

== Operations ==
=== York ===
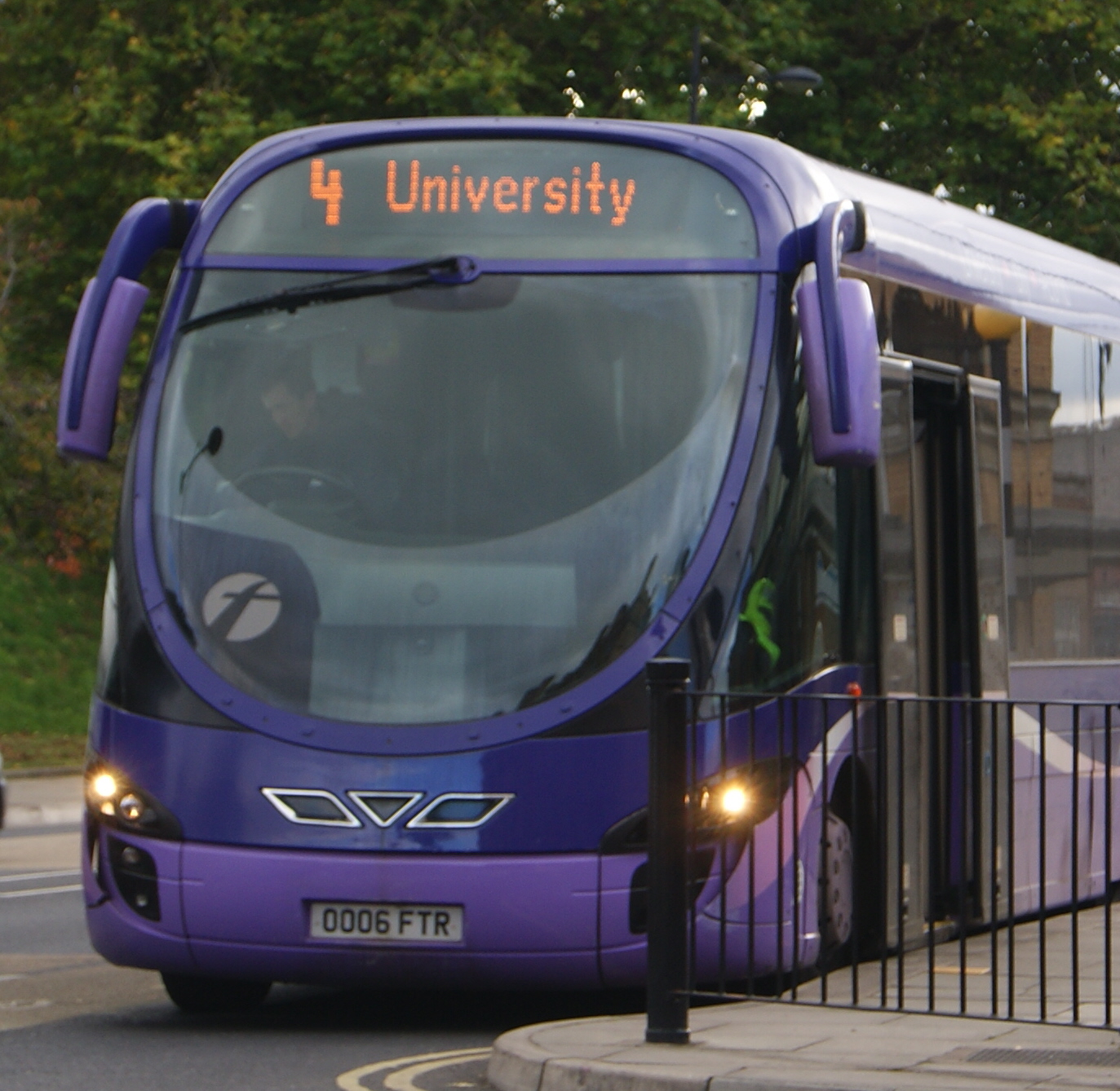
First York Wright StreetCar at York station in October 2010

FTR first operated in York with the conversion of First York's route 4 between Acomb and the University of York. The service began on 8 May 2006, after the city council had made significant and expensive alterations to the road layout to accommodate the new vehicles, including the installation of Kassel kerbs at each bus stop. On the first day of operation, the FTR launch was marred by ticket machines experiencing a software failure, inoperative real-time information systems at bus stops, poor punctuality and bus bunching, the latter two due to up to an hour of service delays as a result of other buses breaking down in the city centre and driver inexperience.

The launch of the FTR in York received universally negative coverage in the local media. On 10 May 2006 The Press devoted four full pages to it, including its front page and a double-page spread of 12 readers' letters, almost all of them hostile. The next day the paper published a defence of the vehicles' teething problems by First York's commercial director, accompanied by another five hostile letters. Another full-page article appeared two days later, and this was followed by national press coverage. On 17 May 2006, councillor Ann Reid was quoted as saying "The majority [of complaints] seem to have come from those who don't live on the route or certainly don't even catch the bus".

The student press criticised the FTRs. Student anger was particularly directed at the price of tickets on the FTR, which increased by 20% in 2008 for a single ticket from campus into town. The price problem was resolved when the students' union negotiated a £2 student price for a return ticket from the campus to town.

The York FTR service was withdrawn in March 2012 and replaced by conventional double-decker buses, with 22 of 29 conductors employed by First York losing their jobs as a result.

=== Leeds ===
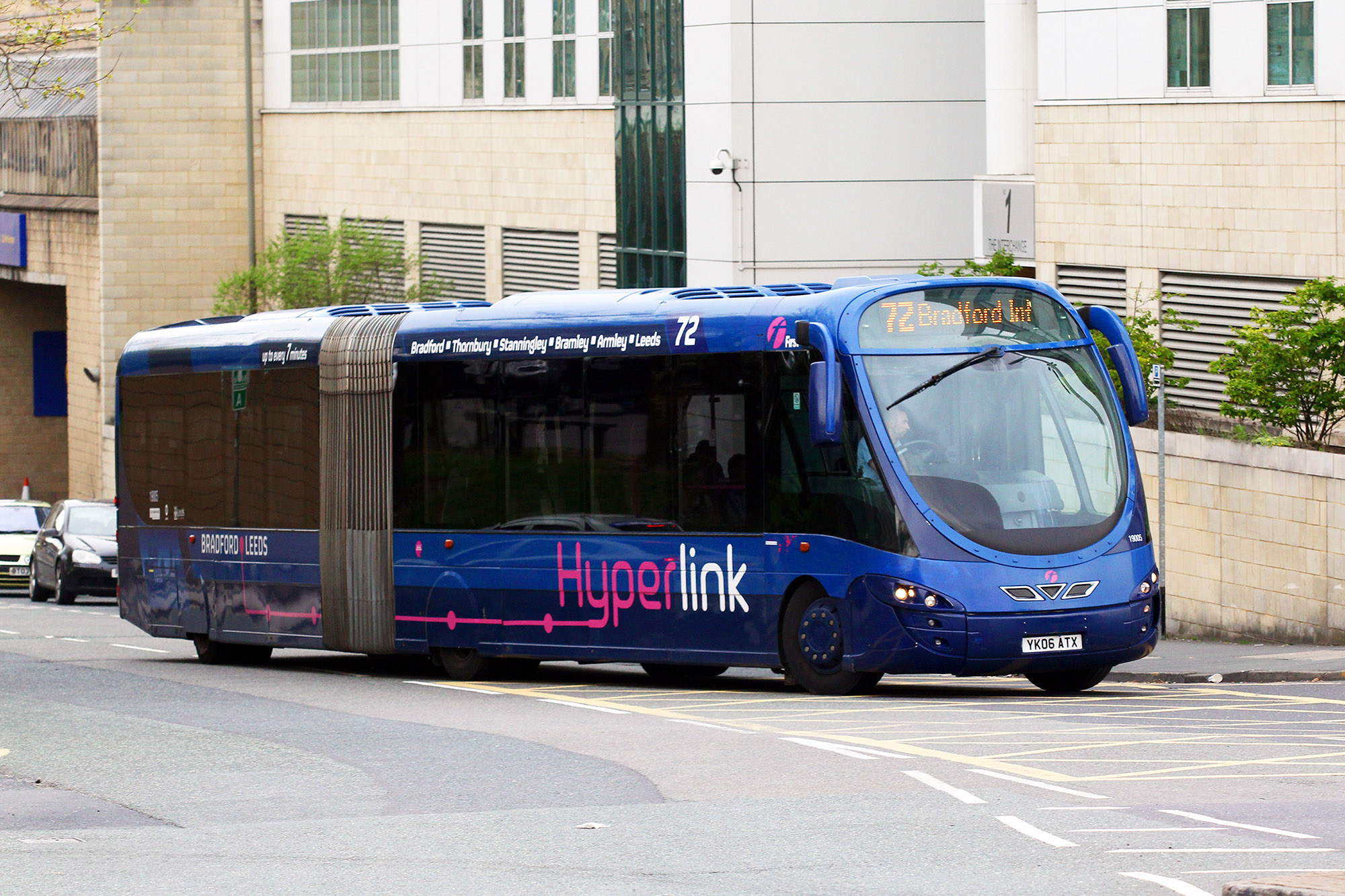
First West Yorkshire Hyperlink Wright StreetCar in May 2017

Following the cancellation of the Leeds Supertram project, the local passenger transport executive Metro suggested various bus rapid transit options as a replacement, one of which was an FTR service. The FTR system was chosen, with a 'phased introduction' planned for late 2006 that would have seen only two FTR buses enter service alongside conventional buses on route 4 between Pudsey, Seacroft and Whinmoor via Leeds City Square. This, however, was delayed until after the Christmas period, with Leeds' FTR system becoming fully operational by early 2007.

Following the York FTR's withdrawal, the system's StreetCar buses were transferred to Leeds and refurbished, including the installation of free Wi-Fi, for use on a new high-frequency Hyperlink service on route 72 connecting Leeds to Bradford. In July 2016, the FTR articulated buses were replaced by brand new Wright StreetDeck double-decker buses, with the Hyperlink brand withdrawn.

=== Luton Airport ===
Due to a delay of the introduction of FTR services in Swansea, four spare FTR buses were operated on the First Capital Connect service by First Northampton between 2008, providing a frequent link between the airport and Luton Airport Parkway railway station. Three of these were eventually replaced by Mercedes-Benz Citaro O530Gs, releasing the FTRs for use in Swansea. The use of bigger buses reflects growth in the number of people using the airport rail link, which has more than doubled since the Parkway station opened in 1999. It carried almost 10 million people a year. The FTR were branded as train2plane and ran every 10 minutes, 19 hours a day (05:00 – 00:00), and connected with all trains from London during the night. In March 2023, an automated people mover came into service, Luton DART, replacing the Luton Airport bus link.

=== Swansea ===
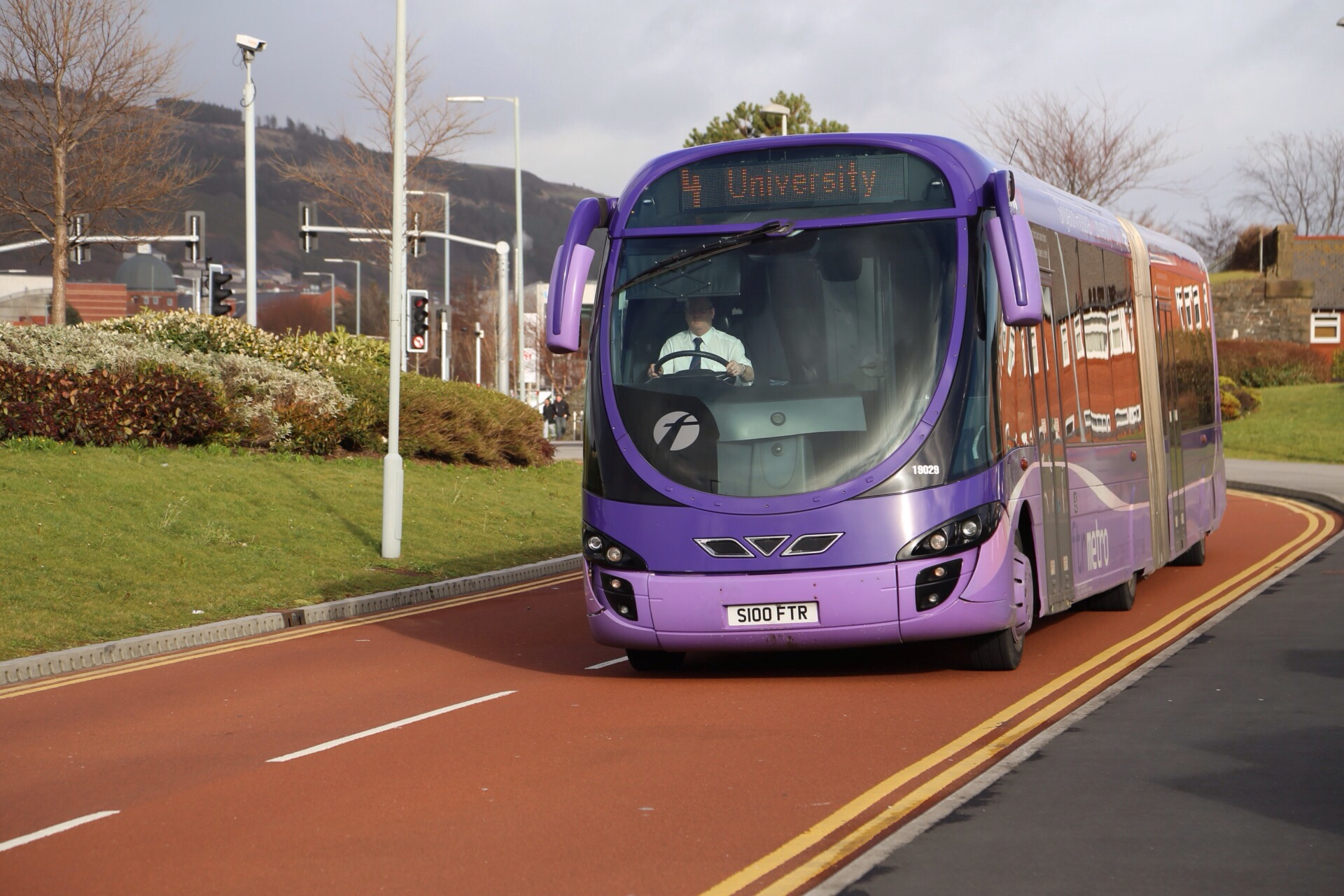
First Cymru ftrmetro Wright StreetCar in Swansea in February 2014

Swansea's FTR network commenced on 1 June 2009, having been delayed from late 2008, with FTRs running on route 4 in a phased introduction over several months. The service, publicised as ftrmetro, links Morriston Hospital, Morriston, the City Centre and the University/Singleton Hospital, with five services per hour through the daytime. Extensive streetworks were carried out along the route, including segregated running through the city centre and an "express route" by-passing the busy residential streets of Hafod.

The fleet of Wright StreetCar articulated vehicles were removed from Swansea on 28 August 2015; First Cymru cited refurbishment costs as a key factor. Although the articulated vehicles were removed from service, the same route is now served by standard single-deck Wright StreetLite buses and other similar vehicles.
