= Guided bus =

Buses that operate on guided tracks

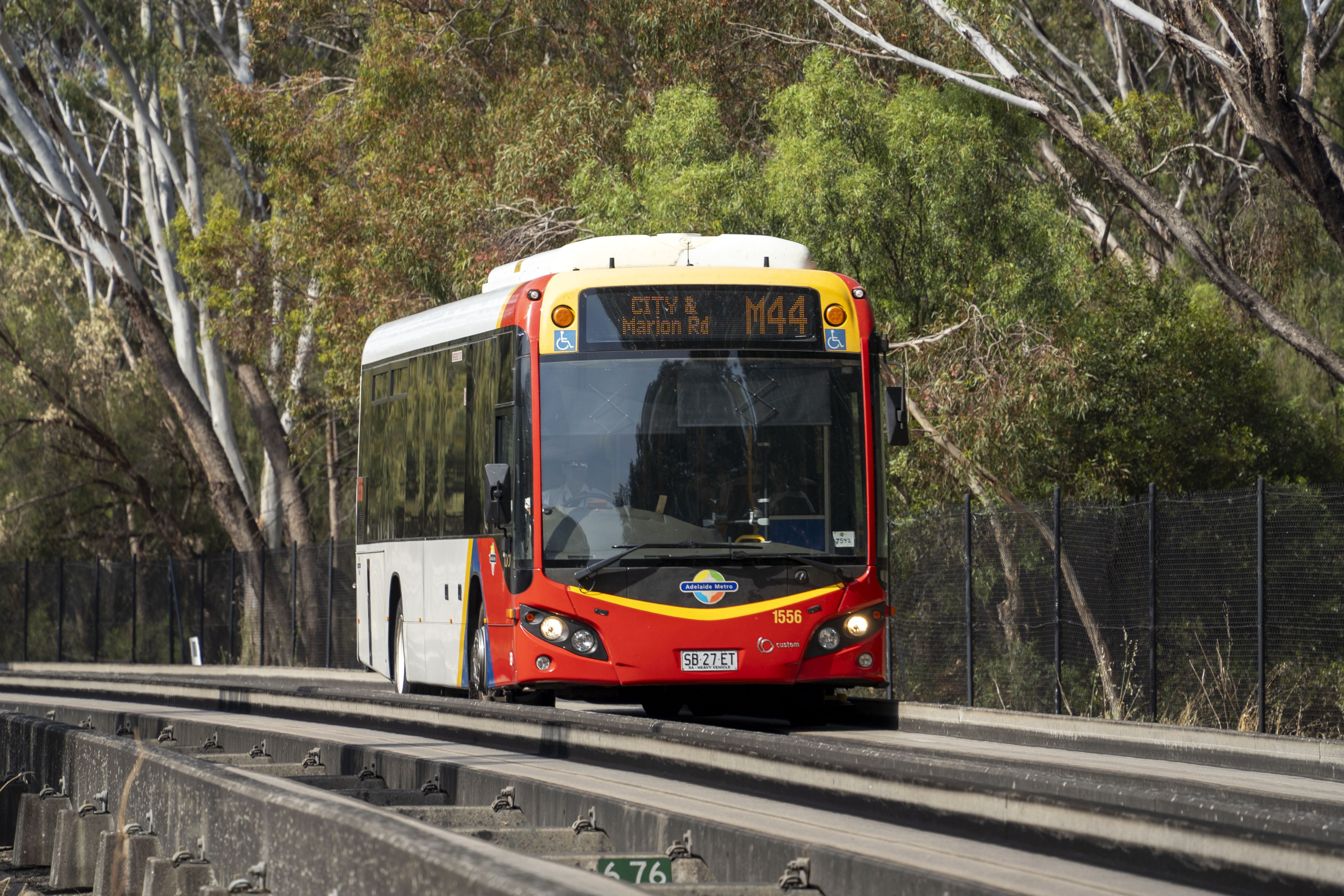
A Scania K280UB bus on the O-Bahn Busway route in Adelaide, Australia

Guided buses are buses capable of being steered by external means, usually on a dedicated track or roll way that excludes other traffic, permitting the maintenance of schedules even during rush hours. Unlike railbuses, trolleybuses or rubber-tyred trams, guided buses are able to share road space with general traffic along conventional roads for part of their routes, or with buses on standard bus lanes. Guidance systems can be physical (such as kerbs or guide bars) or remote (such as optical or radio guidance).

A guided bus line can be categorised as bus rapid transit, and may be articulated and bi-articulated, allowing more passengers; however, not as many as light rail or trams, which are not constrained to a regulated maximum size in order to freely navigate public roads.

== History ==
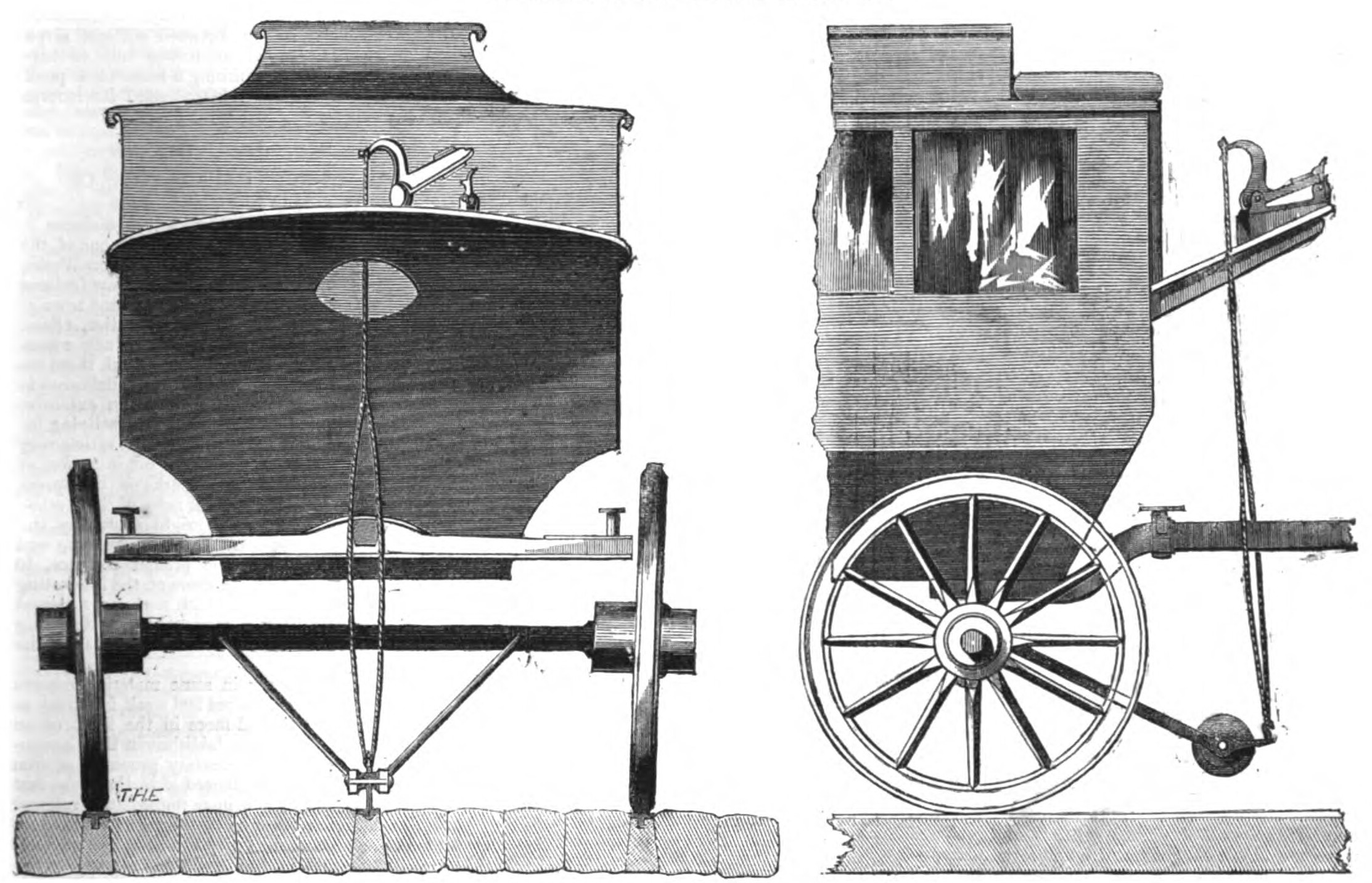
Guided omnibus from Manchester

=== Precursors ===
The kerb-guided bus (KGB) guidance mechanism is a development of the early flangeways, pre-dating railways. The Gloucester and Cheltenham Tramroad of 1809 therefore has a claim to be the earliest guided busway. There were earlier flangeways, but they did not carry passengers. From 1861 to 1872 another system with one central grooved rail was used in the Manchester region.

=== Modern examples ===
The first modern guided busway system was opened in 1980 in Essen, Germany. This was initially a demonstration track, but it was periodically expanded and is still in operation as of 2019.

The first guided busway in the United Kingdom was in Birmingham, the Tracline 65, 1,968 feet (600 m) long, experimentally in 1984. It closed in 1987.

Based on the experience in Essen, in 1986 the Government of South Australia opened the O-Bahn Busway in Adelaide. This is a 12 kilometres (7.5 mi) guided busway with two interchanges along the route, Klemzig Interchange and Paradise Interchange, before ending at Tea Tree Plaza Interchange.

In Mannheim, Germany, from May 1992 to September 2005, a guided busway shared the tram alignment for a few hundred metres, which allowed buses to avoid a congested stretch of road where there was no space for an extra traffic lane. It was discontinued, as the majority of buses fitted with guide wheels were withdrawn for age reasons. There are no plans to convert newer buses.

The Nagoya Guideway Bus opened in March 2001 and is the only guided bus line in Japan.

The Cambridgeshire Guided Busway between Cambridge and St Ives in England, at 25 kilometres (16 mi), is the world's longest guided busway. It was opened on 7 August 2011.

Between 2004 and 2008, a 1-mile (1.5 km) section of guided busway was in operation between Stenhouse and Broomhouse in the west of Edinburgh, Scotland. The route was later converted for use by Edinburgh trams.

== Rubber-tyred trams and translohr ==
=== Rubber-tyred trams ===
Guided buses are to be distinguished from rubber-tyred systems that cannot run other than along a dedicated trackway, or under fixed overhead power lines.

Tram-like guided busway (rubber-tyred tram) systems, using Bombardier Guided Light Transit technology include:

- Caen, France
- Nancy, France.

The first is replaced with conventional trams and the other is being used as a trolleybus without the guide system.

=== Translohr ===
- Clermont-Ferrand, France
- Île-de-France tramway Line 5,
- Île-de-France tramway Line 6 in Paris, France.
- Shanghai, China
- Tianjin, China
- Medellín, Colombia
- Padua, Italy
- Venice-Mestre, Italy

Also called "trams on rubber tyres".

=== Autonomous Rapid Transit ===
Autonomous Rapid Transit (ART) is equipped with various optical and other types of sensors to allow the vehicle to automatically follow a route defined by a virtual track of markings on the roadway. A steering wheel also allows the driver to manually guide the vehicle, including around detours.

Just like guided busway, electric buses use batteries to power their electric motors, and ebus combine elements of guided trolleybuses introduce new IMC (In-Motion Charging) technology, and wireless charging technology from embedded coils in roadways to automated depot charging pads as for "opportunity charging" electric buses while they are on the road, typically at bus stops or terminals, rather than solely at the depot, electric road system, is a road that provides electric power to vehicles as they travel on it, guided bi-articulated bus system for urban passenger transport.

- Zhuzhou ART, China
- Yibin ART, China
- Lingang DRT, China
- Tren ligero de Campeche (ART) Tren de Tránsito Autónomo, Mexico.

== Guidance systems ==
=== Optical guidance ===
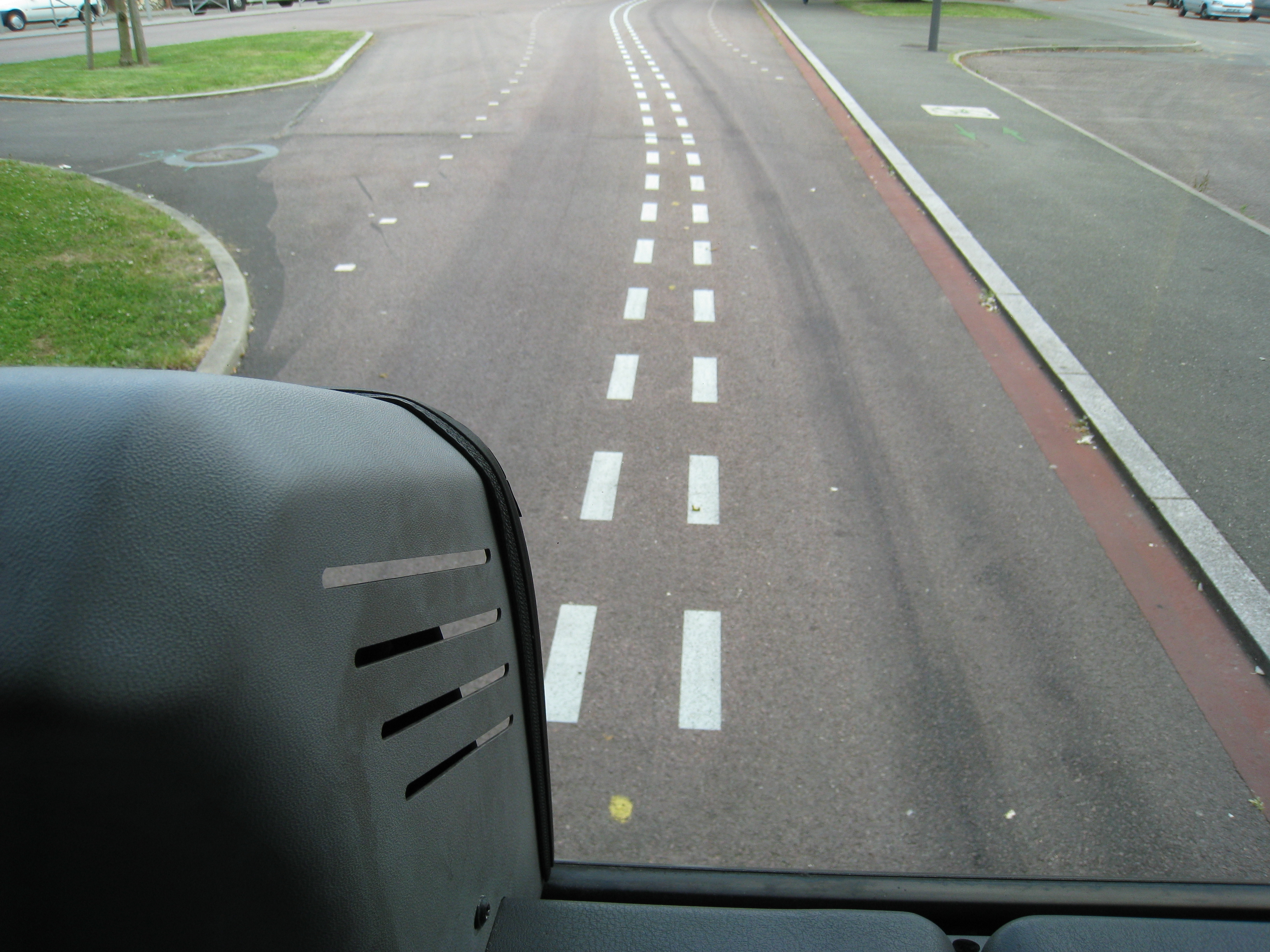
An optical guidance device on TEOR bus in Rouen

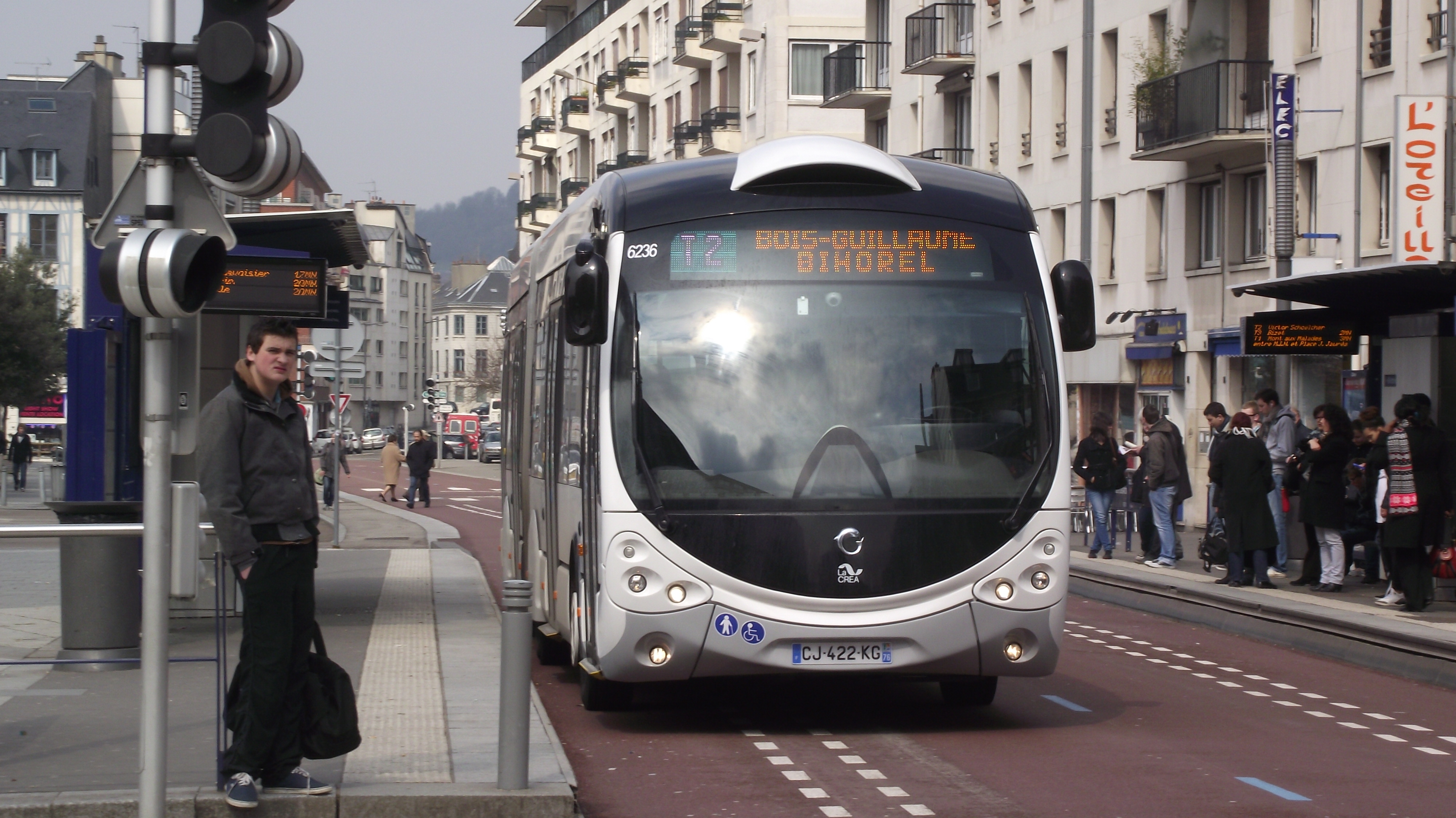
Irisbus Crealis Neo, an optically guided TEOR bus in Rouen

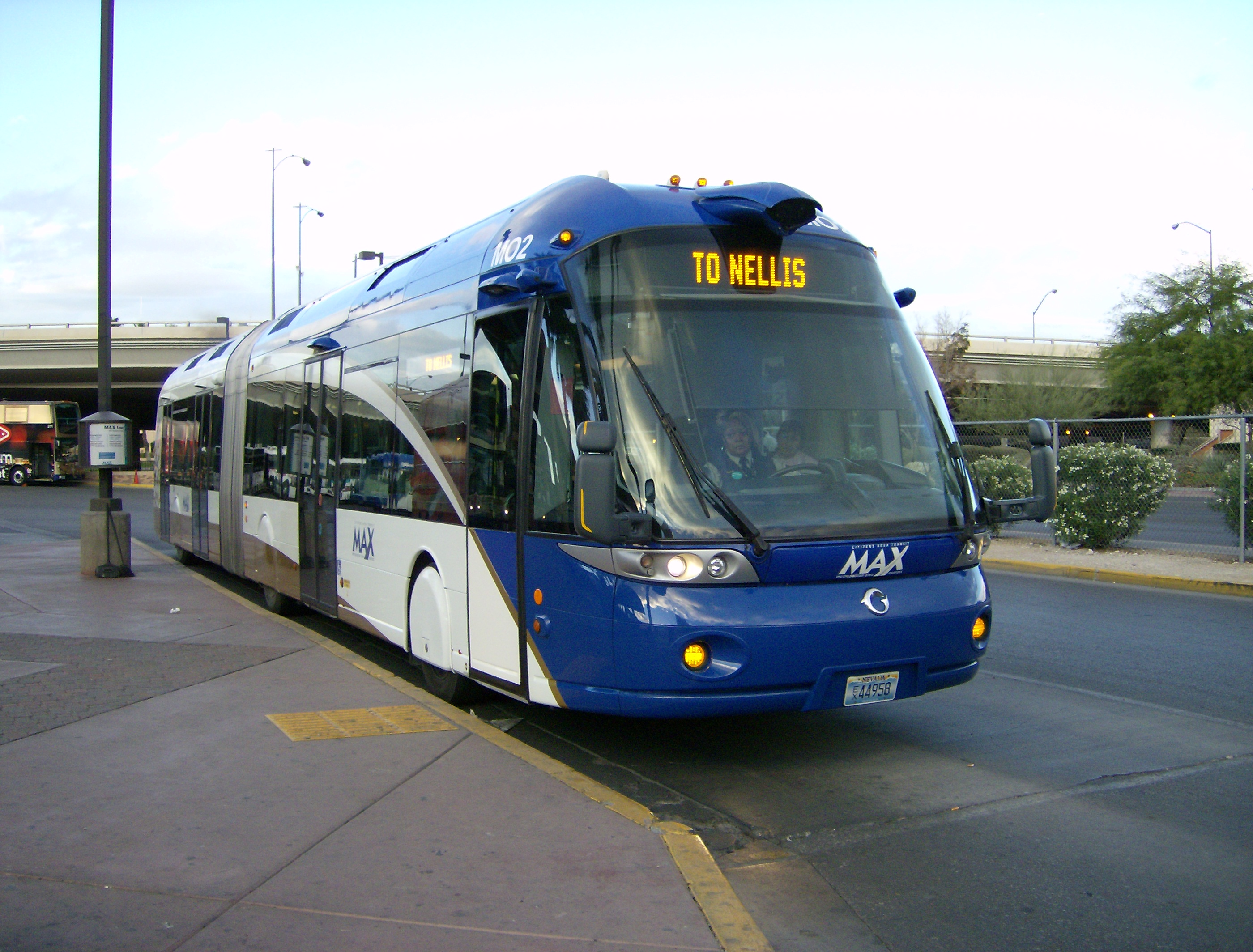
MAX bus system in Las Vegas

Optical guidance relies on the principles of image processing. A camera in the front of the vehicle scans the bands of paint on the ground representing the reference path. The signals obtained by the camera are sent to an onboard computer, which combines them with dynamic parameters of the vehicle (speed, yaw rate, wheel angle). The calculator transmits commands to the guidance motor located on the steering column of the vehicle to control its path in line with that of the reference.

Optical guidance is a means of approaching light rail performance with a fast and economical set-up. It enables buses to have precision-docking capabilities as efficient as those of light rail and reduces dwell times, making it possible to drive the vehicle to a precise point on a platform according to an accurate and reliable trajectory. The distance between the door steps and the platform is optimised not to exceed 5 centimetres (2 in). Level boarding is then possible and there is no need to use a mobile ramp for people with mobility impairments.

==== Guided trolleybus ====
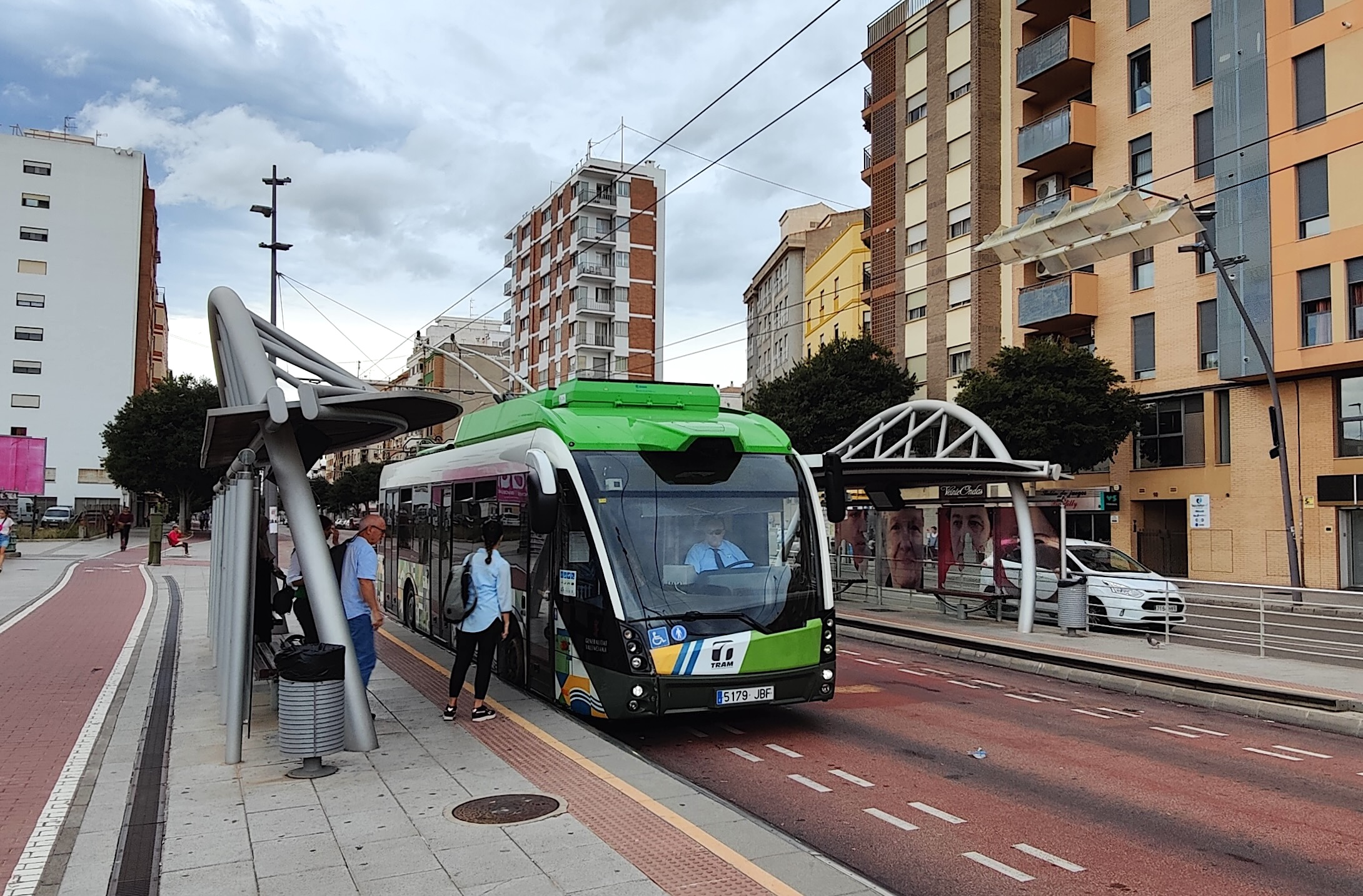
Guided trolleybus in Castellón de la Plana, Spain

The Optiguide system, an optical guidance device developed by Siemens Transportation Systems, has been in revenue service since 2001 in Rouen and Nîmes (only at stations), France, and has been fitted to trolleybuses in Castellon, Spain, since June 2008 and will be in service on buses in the cities of Bologna, Italy.

==== Autonomous rapid transit ====
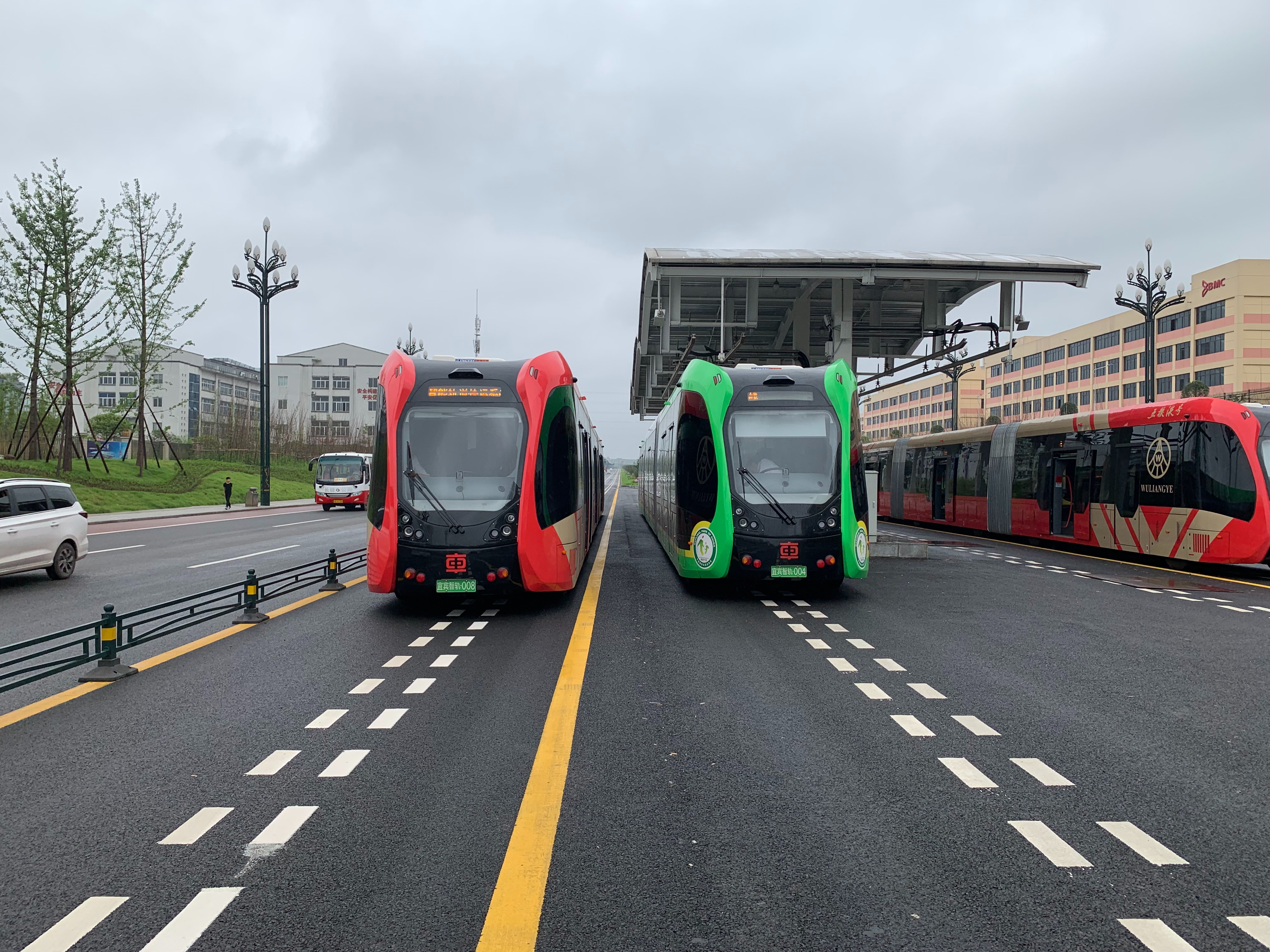
Yibin ART System, Yibin, China

Another system was introduced in 2017, the Autonomous Rapid Transit (ART), and developed by CRRC, uses optical systems to follow markers on a roadway. The ART system is frequently referred to as a "trackless tram" and occasionally as an "optically-guided bus".

=== Magnetic guidance ===
Other experimental systems have non-mechanical guidance, such as sensors or magnets buried in the roadway. In 2004, Stagecoach Group signed a deal with Siemens Mobility to develop an optical guidance system for use in the United Kingdom.

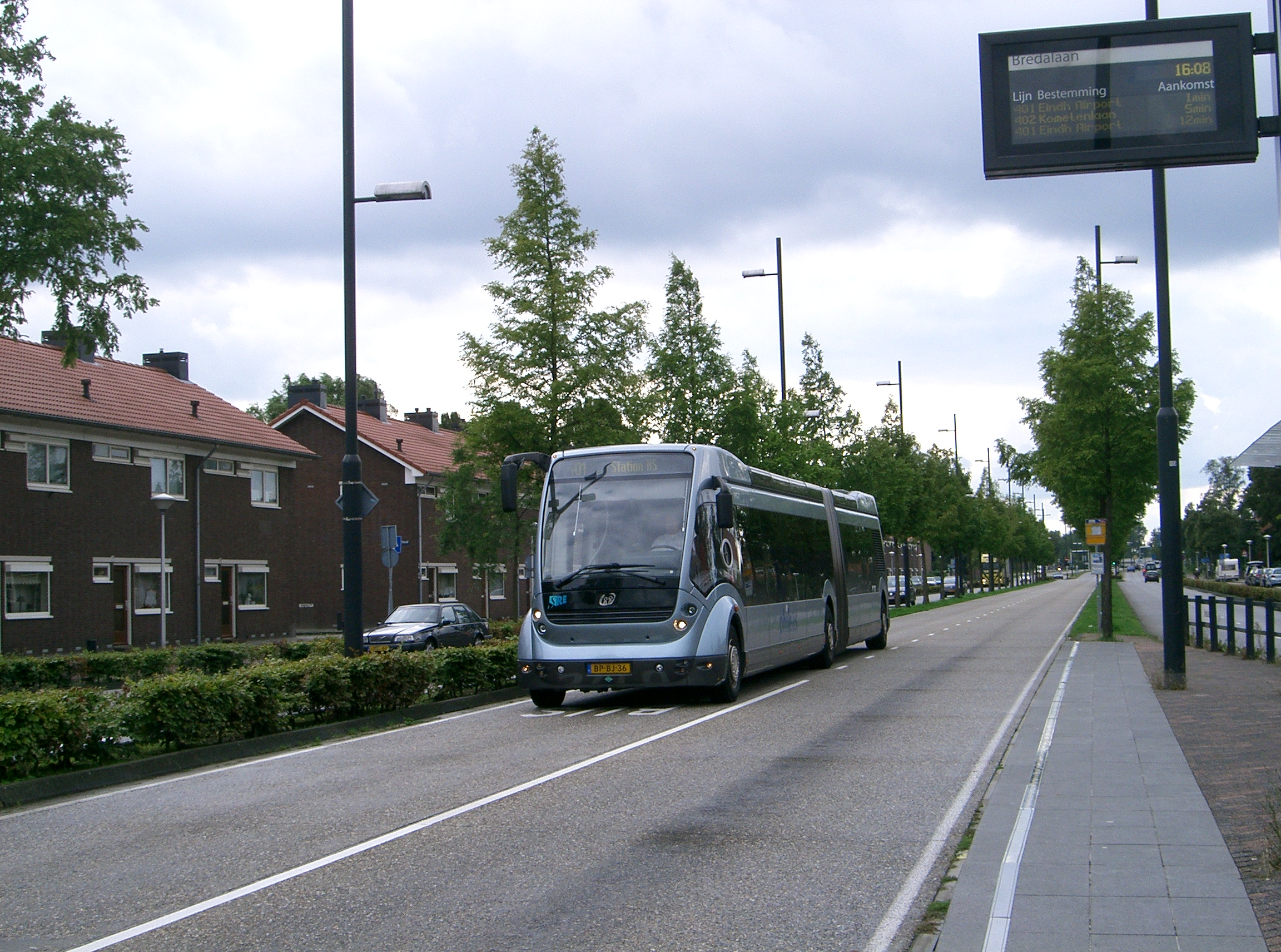
Phileas bus

Two bus lines in Eindhoven, Netherlands, had used Phileas vehicles. Line 401 from Eindhoven station to Eindhoven Airport is 9 km (5.6 mi) long, consists largely of concrete bus lanes and has about 30 raised stop platforms. Line 402 from Eindhoven station to Veldhoven branches off from line 401 and adds another 6 km (3.7 mi) of bus lanes and about 13 stops. Years before the last trip of a Phileas bus in 2016, the regional authority for urban transport in the Eindhoven region (SRE) decided to discontinue the use of magnetic guidance system. In 2014 the manufacturer, APTS, was declared bankrupt.

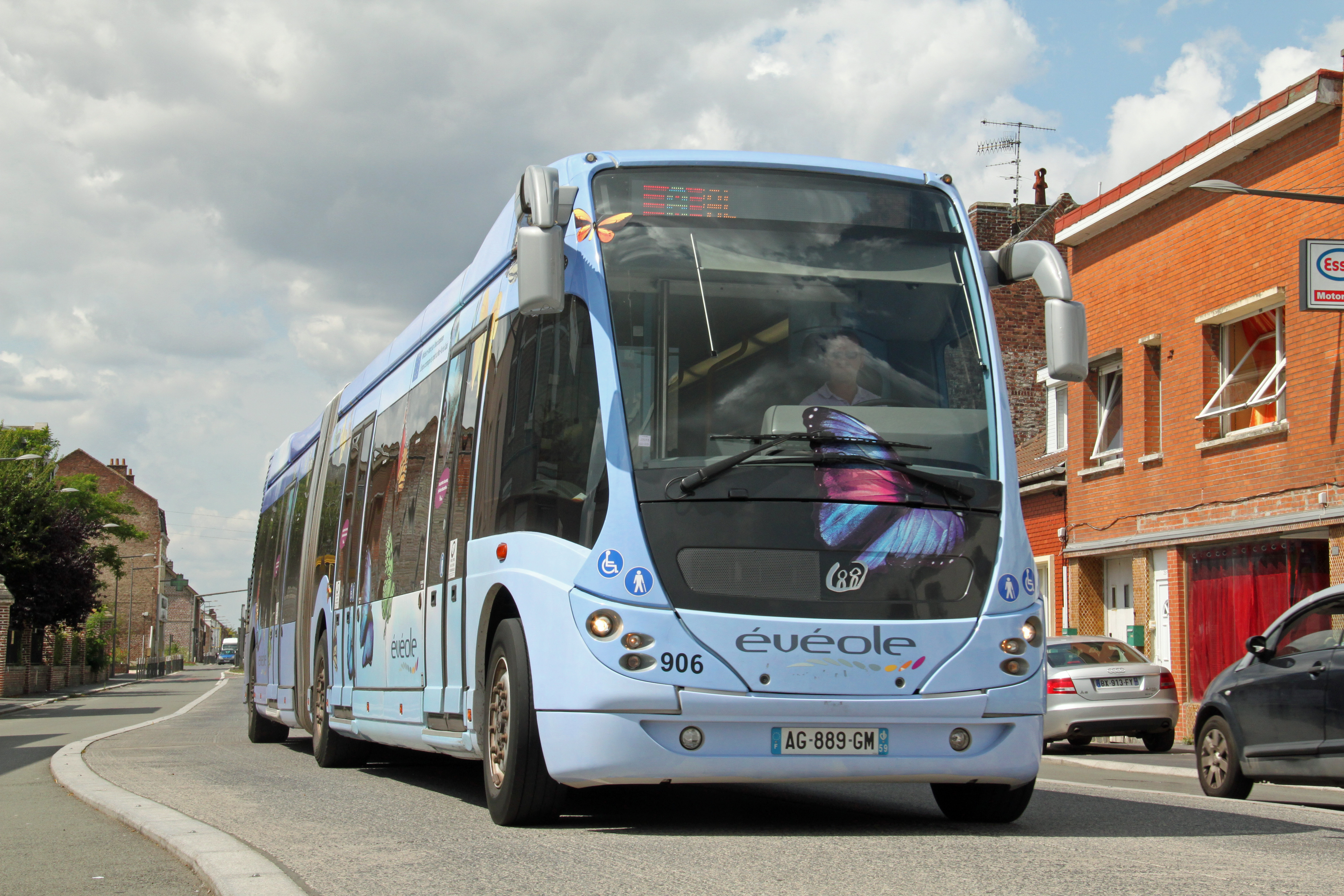
Évéole bus in Douai

The Douai region in France is developing a public transport network using APTS Phileas technology and dedicated infrastructure. The length of the lines will be 34 km (21 mi). The first stage is a line of 12 km (7.5 mi) from Douai via Guesnain to Lewarde, passing close to Waziers, Sin-le-Noble, Dechy and Lambres-lez-Douai. 39 stop platforms will be provided with an average distance between the stops of 400 m (440 yd). A number of stops will be placed on the right-hand side of each lane. Central stops between both lanes will be placed at locations with limited space at the right side. This requires vehicle to have doors on both sides. The buses using Phileas technology were in use from 2008 to 2014.

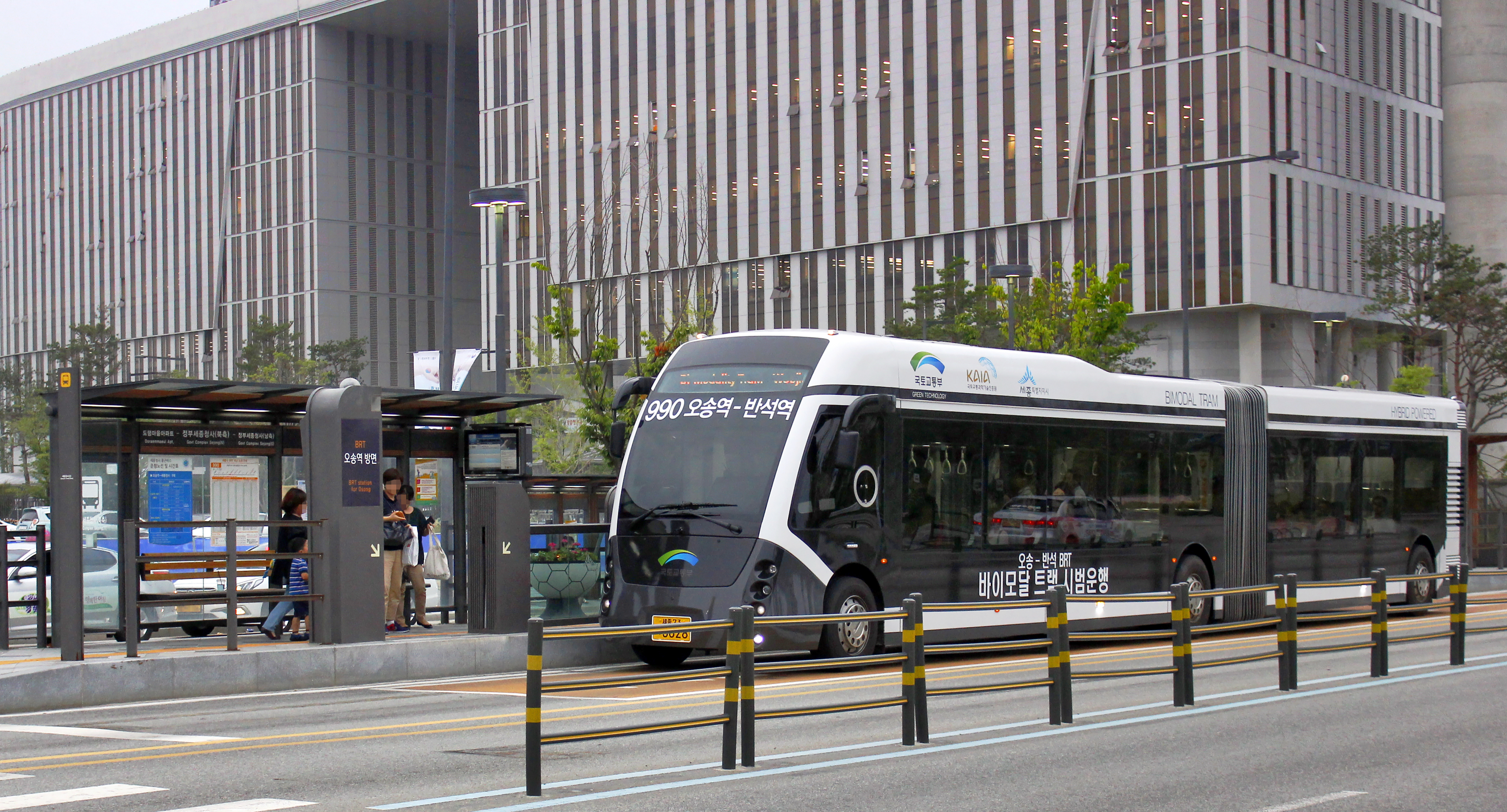
Bimodal Bus-tram and Barota in Sejong City, South Korea

On 3 November 2005, a licence and technology transfer agreement was signed between Advanced Public Transport Systems (APTS) and the Korea Railroad Research Institute (KRRI). KRRI was to develop the Korean version of Phileas vehicle by May 2011.

Since June 2013, 3 miles (4.8 km) (1.5 miles each way) of the Emerald Express (EmX) BRT in Eugene, Oregon, has used magnetic guidance in revenue service on an especially curvy section of the route that also entails small radius S-curves required for docking. The driver controls braking and acceleration.

=== Kerb guidance ===
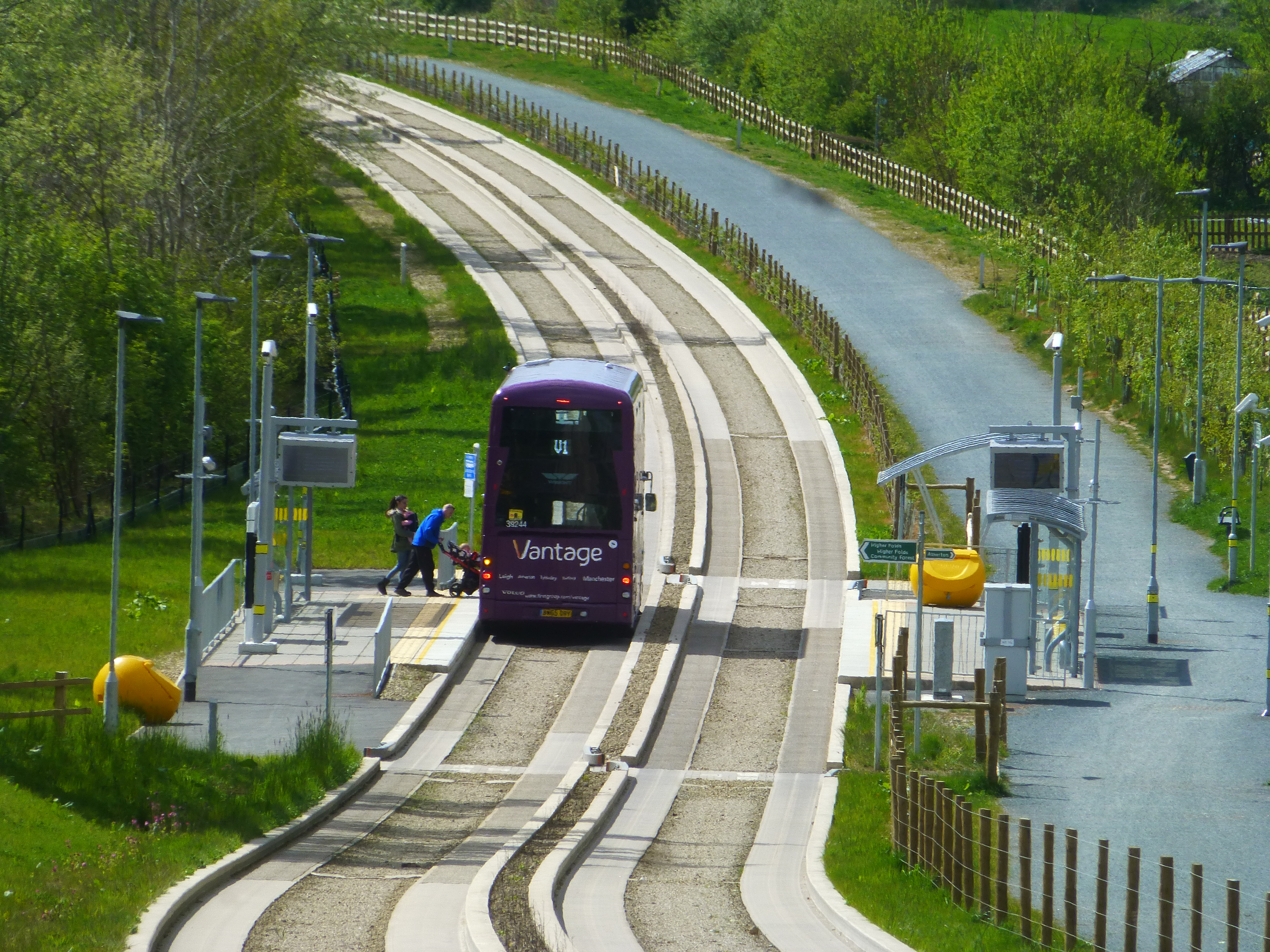
Kerb-guided track and adjacent multi-user path along a disused rail line, on the Leigh-Salford-Manchester Bus Rapid Transit

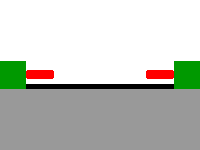
Cross-sectional diagram of the parallel direction curbs of the bus lane in Essen, Germany

On kerb-guided buses (KGB) small guide wheels attached to the bus engage vertical kerbs on either side of the guideway. These guide wheels push the steering mechanism of the bus, keeping it centralised on the track. Away from the guideway, the bus is steered in the normal way. The start of the guideway is funnelled from a wide track to guideway width. This system permits high-speed operation on a narrow guideway and precise positioning at boarding platforms, facilitating access for the elderly and disabled. As guide wheels can be inexpensively attached to, and removed from, almost any standard model of bus, kerb guided busway systems are not tied to particular specialised vehicles or equipment suppliers. Characteristically, operators contracted to run services on kerb-guided busways will purchase or lease the vehicles, as second-hand vehicles (with guide wheels removed) have a ready resale market.

Kerb guided busway guide wheel Mannheim, Germany

The kerb-guided system maintains a narrow track while still enabling buses to pass one another at speed. Consequently, kerb-guided track can be fitted into former double-track rail alignments without the requirement for additional land-take that might have been necessary were a disused railway to be converted into a public highway. Examples include the Cambridgeshire Guided Busway and Leigh-Salford-Manchester Bus Rapid Transit; in both schemes, it has proved possible to provide space for a wide multi-user path for leisure use alongside the kerb-guided double track, all within the boundaries of the disused railway route. Both the Cambridgeshire and Leigh-Salford-Manchester schemes have reported greatly increased levels of patronage (both on the buses themselves and the adjacent paths), high levels of modal transfer of travellers from private car use and high levels of passenger satisfaction.

== List of guided busways systems ==
Systems with conventional/modified buses:

Country	City	System name	Started	Closure	Routes	Number of stations	Length	Notes
Australia	Adelaide	O-Bahn Busway	9 March 1986		-	3	12 km (7.5 mi)	BRT system
France	Douai	Évéole	8 February 2010		1	37	34 km (21 mi)	Guided busway APTS Phileas (BRT system)
France	Nîmes	BRT Tango+	29 September 2012		1	9	7.2 km (4.5 mi)	BRT system
France	Rouen	TEOR	12 February 2001		4	64	39 km (24 mi)	BRT system
Germany	Essen	Spurbus	1980		2	-	24.2 km (15.0 mi)	Guided busway system
Germany	Mannheim	O-Bahn	May 1992	September 2005	-	-	-	Guided busway system
Italy	Bologna	Trolleybuses in Bologna	4 January 1991		5	-	-	Guided busway system
Japan	Nagoya	Yutorito Line	23 March 2001		4	9	6.5 km (4.0 mi)	BRT system
Netherlands	Eindhoven	Phileas	2003		3	32	15 km (9.3 mi)	BRT system
South Korea	Sejong City	Bimodal tram	March 2016		-	-	20.1 km (12.5 mi)	BRT system
Spain	Castellón de la Plana	Trolleybuses in Castellón de la Plana	25 June 2008		1	19	7.77 km (4.83 mi)	BRT system
United Kingdom	Birmingham	Tracline 65	1984	1987	-	-	-	Guided busway system
United Kingdom	Bradford	Manchester Road Quality Bus Initiative Bradford end	October 2001		-	-	-	BRT system
United Kingdom	Bristol	MetroBus	29 May 2018		5	-	50 km (31 mi)	BRT system
United Kingdom	Cambridgeshire	Cambridgeshire Guided Busway (Huntingdon to Trumpington)	7 August 2011		3	8	25 km (16 mi)	BRT system
United Kingdom	Crawley	Fastway BRT	October 2006		3	150	1.5 km (0.93 mi)	BRT system
United Kingdom	Edinburgh	Edinburgh Fastlink	December 2004	January 2009	2	-	1.5 km (0.93 mi)	Guided busway system
United Kingdom	Gosport	South East Hampshire Bus Rapid Transit (Eclipse Busway)	22 April 2012		2	7	3.4 km (2.1 mi)	BRT system
United Kingdom	Ipswich	Ipswich Rapid Transit (Superroute 66)	1995		-	-	-	BRT system
United Kingdom	Greater Manchester	Leigh-Salford-Manchester Bus Rapid Transit (Vantage-Leigh-Kerb Guided Busway)	3 April 2016		2	14	7.2 km (4.5 mi)	BRT system
United Kingdom	Leeds	Leeds Superbus	July 1998		-	-	-	BRT system
United Kingdom	Luton	Luton to Dunstable Busway	24 September 2013		-	-	7.7 km (4.8 mi)	BRT system
United States	Eugene	Emerald Express	14 January 2007		2	37	2.4 km (1.5 mi)	BRT system
United States	Las Vegas	ACE BRT (Max)	30 June 2004		-	22	11.2 km (7.0 mi)	BRT system guided busway Irisbus Civis

== Gallery ==
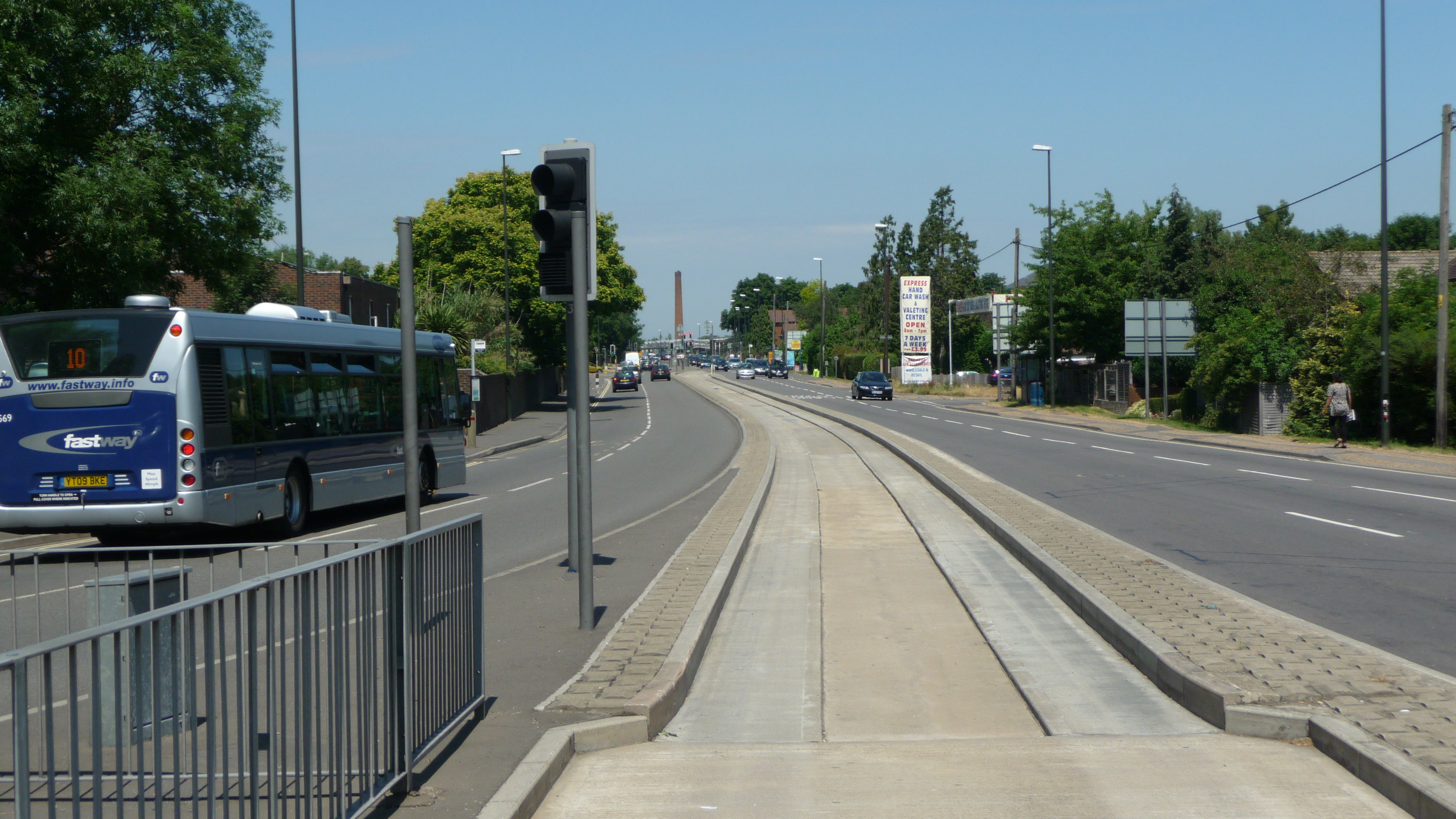
Crawley A23 London Road guided busway, England.

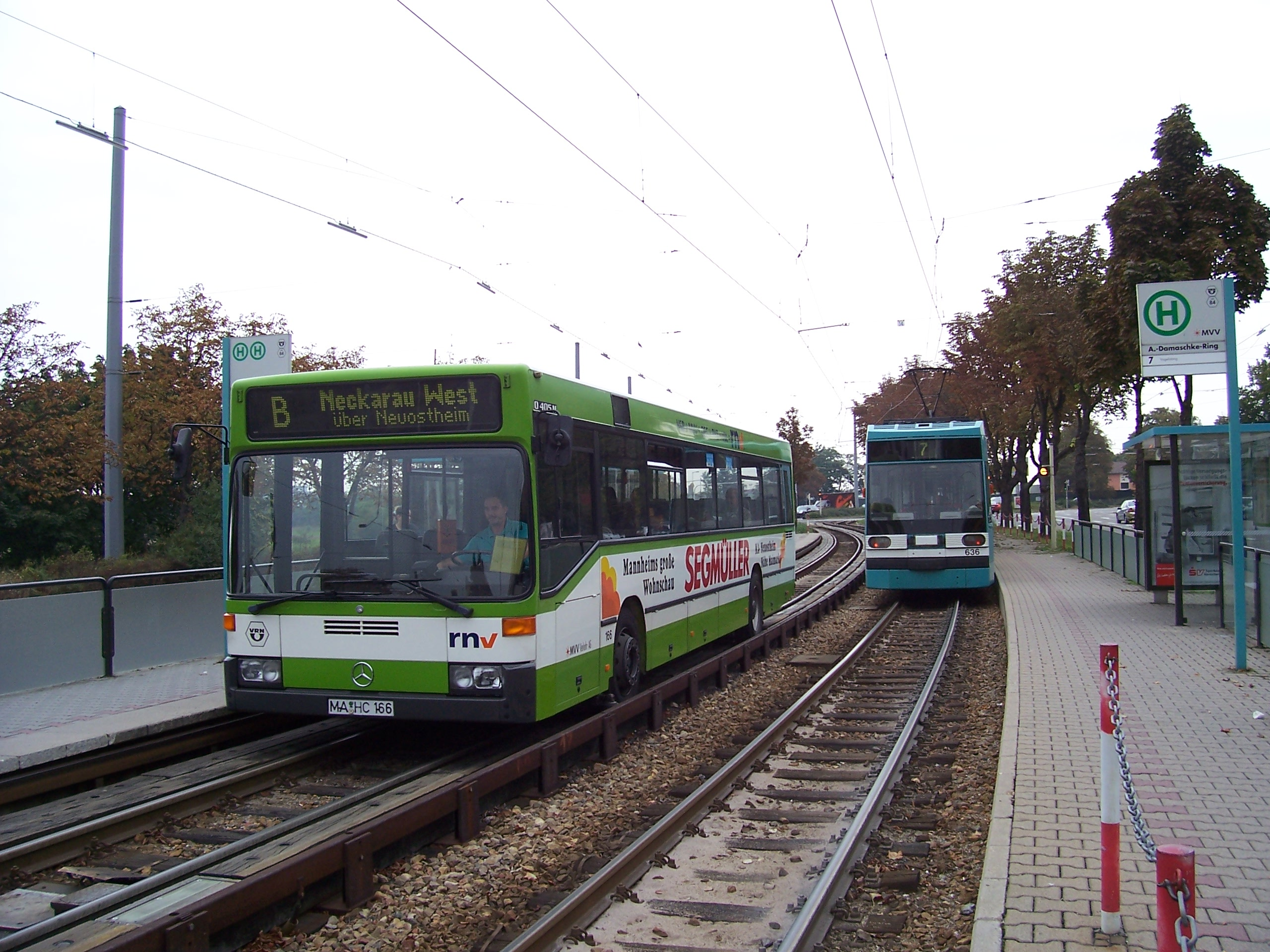
Mannheim guided bus.

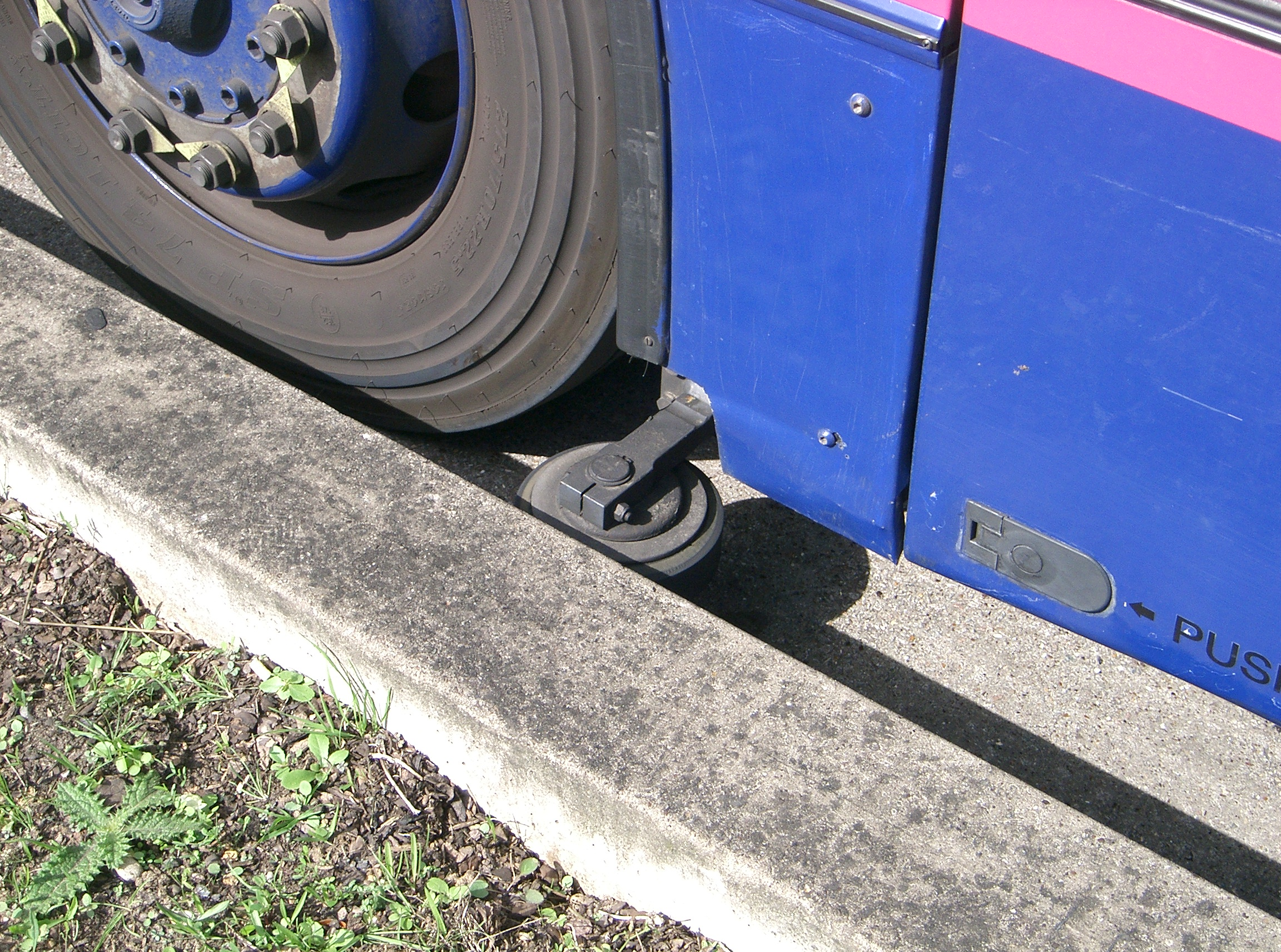
The kerb guide wheel of a bus in Ipswich, England

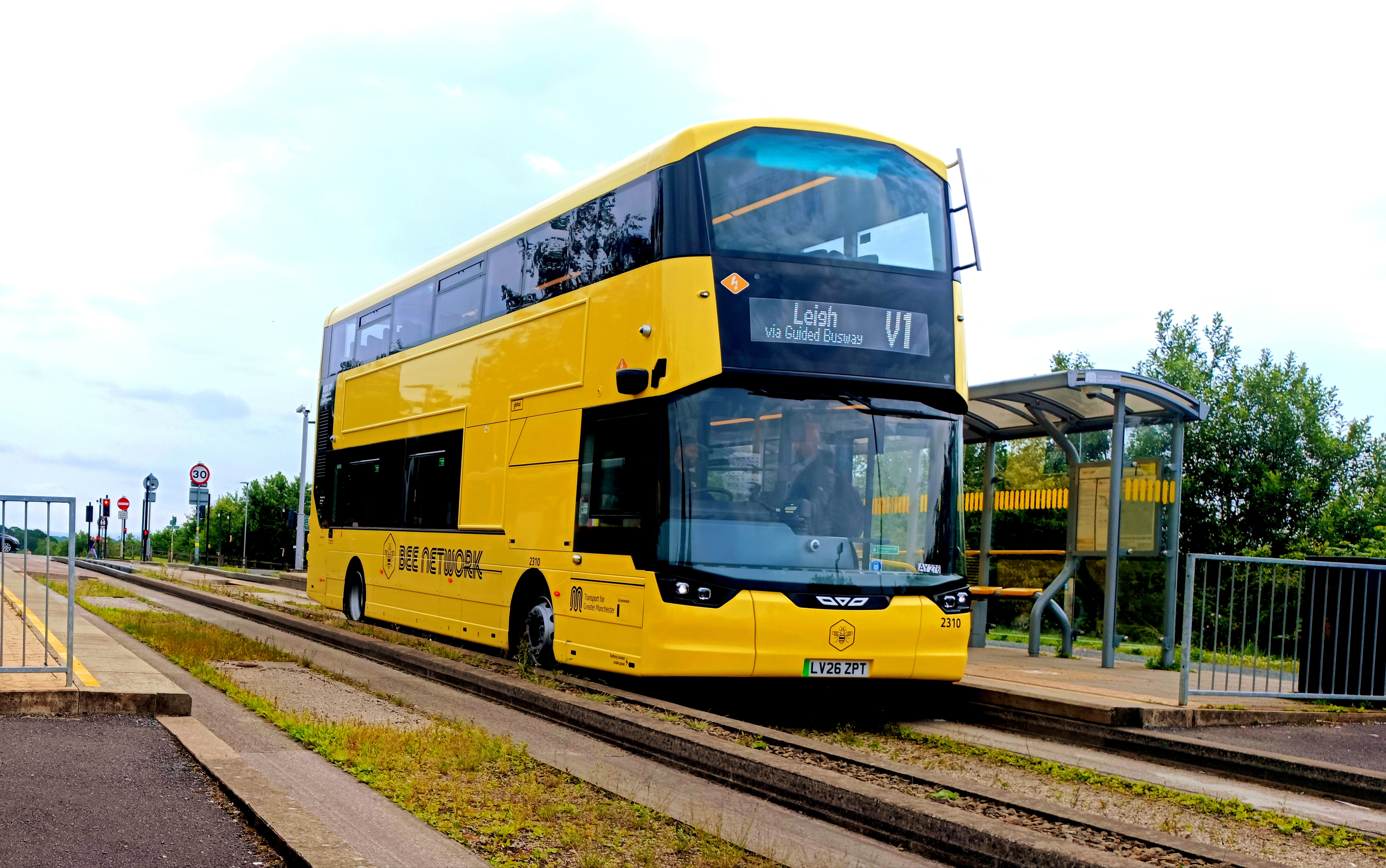
A double-decker bus on the Leigh-Salford-Manchester Bus Rapid Transit, England

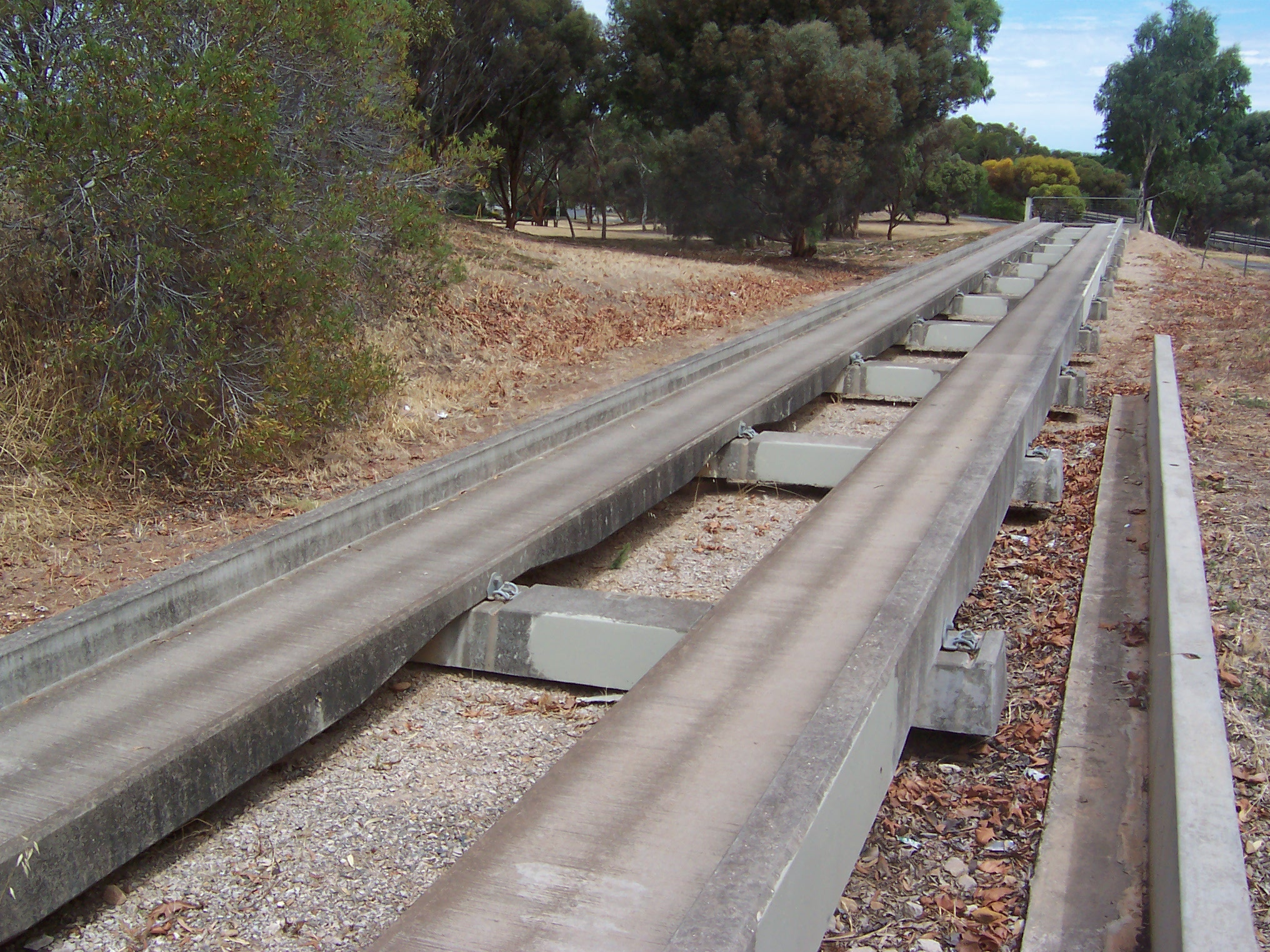
A section of track used for testing O-Bahn Busway buses

== See also ==
- Automated guideway transit
- Autonomous Rapid Transit
- Bombardier Guided Light Transit
- Bus rapid transit
- Criticism of bus rapid transit
- Dual-mode bus
- Guide rail
- Kassel kerb (Known as Kassel curb)
- Quality Bus Corridor
- Queue jump
- Road–rail buses
- Road–rail vehicle
- Rubber-tyred metro
- Trackless train
- Transit Elevated Bus
- Translohr
- Trolleybus
