= Tracline 65 =

First guided busway line in the United Kingdom

Coordinates: 52.52999°N 1.85856°W

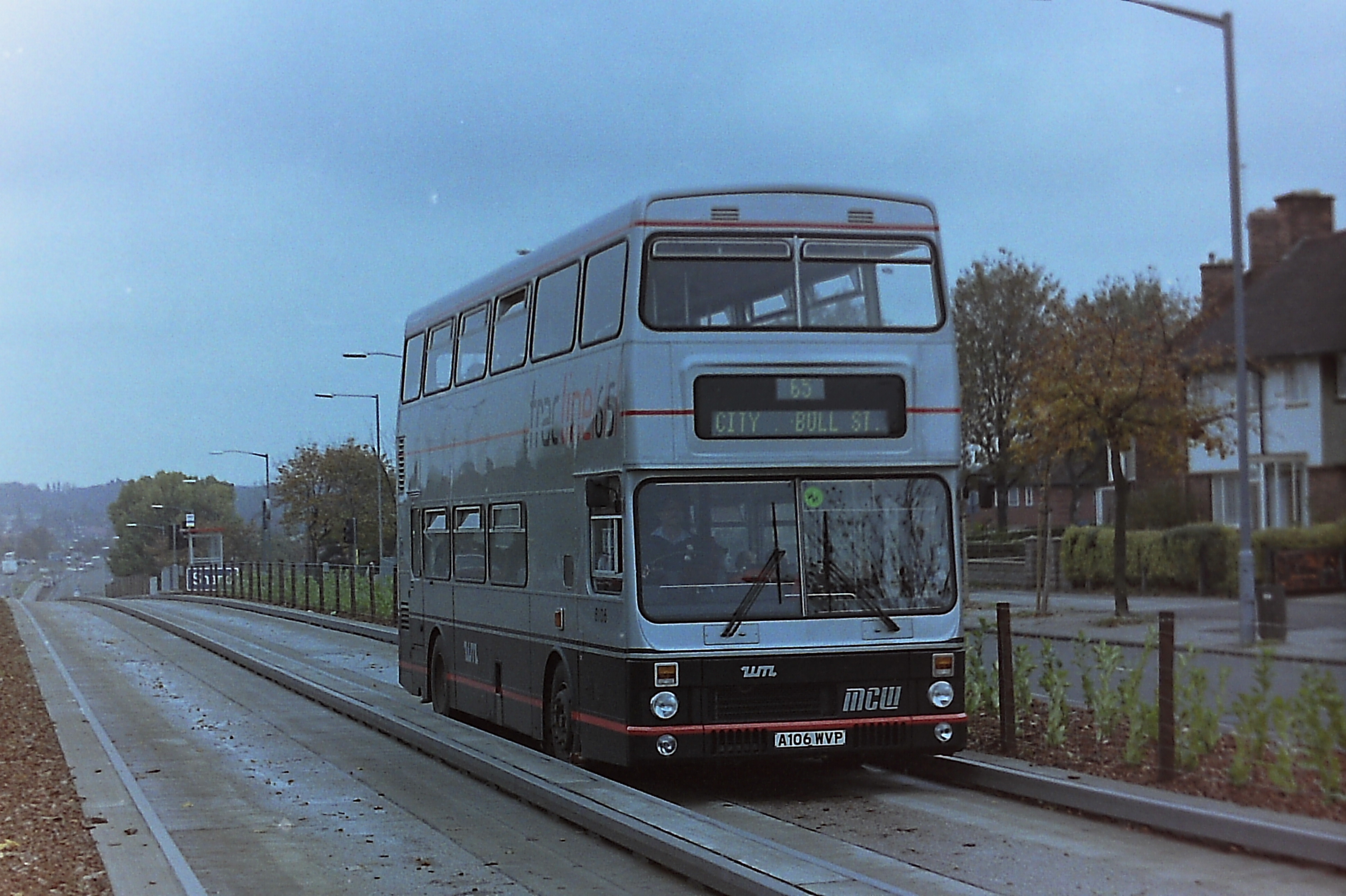
- MCW Metrobus on the guided section of the route in Short Heath in October 1984

Overview
- Operator: West Midlands Passenger Transport Executive; West Midlands Travel
- Vehicle: MCW Metrobus
- Predecessors: Route 65

Tracline 65 was a bus route in Birmingham, England which included the first guided busway in the United Kingdom.

The existing route 65 bus route was upgraded as part of an experiment to improve bus services, by the West Midlands Passenger Transport Executive. A 600-metre section of concrete-edged guideway was installed on Streetly Road in the Short Heath area, a few miles from Erdington village, at the northern terminal of the route. Located in a central reservation once used by Birmingham Corporation trams, it was segregated from the carriageway used by other vehicular traffic. At the southern end of the trackway, buses used ordinary roads to reach the city centre.

Fourteen MCW Metrobus Mark II buses were acquired and fitted with guide wheels, which ran along the guideway's concrete edges. The vehicles were painted in a distinct livery, unique to Tracline 65, being silver with black and red detailing. It began operating in 1984. The trial ended in 1987 and all buses had their guide wheels removed and returned to normal services; the last withdrawn on 26 April 2008. The buses retained their distinctive destination display and gap in the front wheel arch where the guide wheels had been. One, fleet number 8110, is preserved at Aston Manor Road Transport Museum.
