= Trolleybuses in Castellón de la Plana =

Electric transit system serving Castellón de la Plana, Spain

Castellón trolleybus system
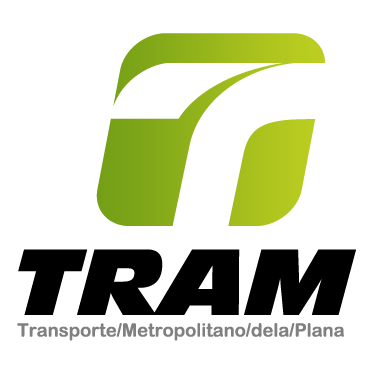

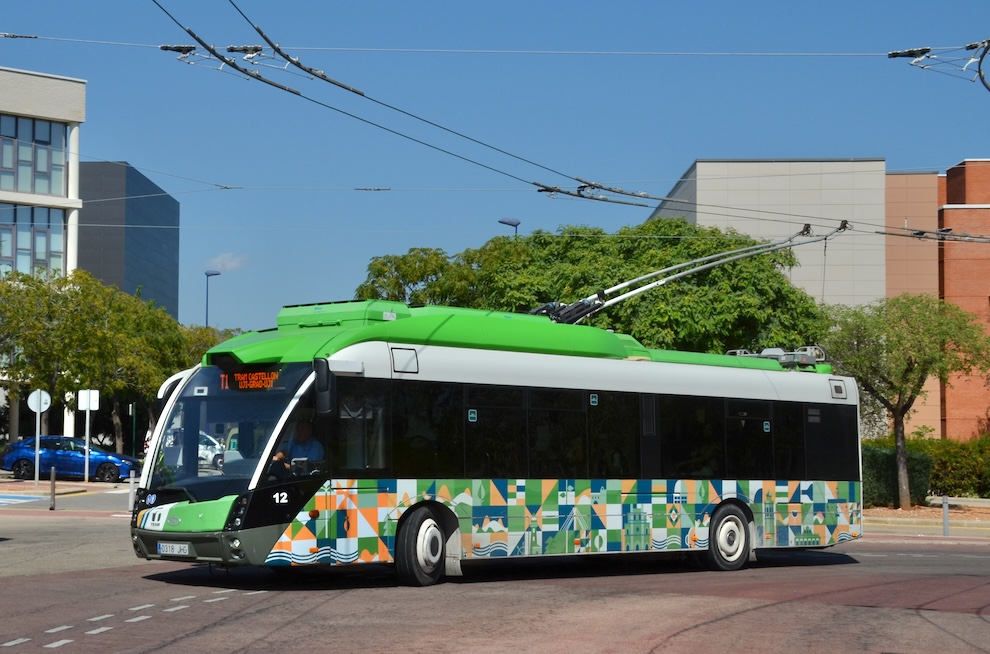
- A Solaris trolleybus arriving at Jaume I University

Operation
- Locale: Castellón de la Plana, Spain

Statistics
First era: 1961–1966
- Status: Closed
- Route length: 11 km (6.8 mi)
Current era: since 2008
- Status: Open
- Routes: 1
- Electrification: 750 Volts DC
- Stock: Trolleybuses with optical guidance
- Route length: 7.7 km (5 mi) westbound / 8.2 km (5 mi) eastbound

The Castellón trolleybus system forms part of the public transport service in Castellón de la Plana (known as Castelló de la Plana in the Valencian language), Spain, where the service is branded as the "TRAM", for Transporte Metropolitano de la Plana. The trolleybus system opened in 2008 and consists of a single route, with bus-only lanes over the entire route and optical guidance over part. An earlier trolleybus system served Castellón from 1961 to 1966.

== First system ==
The town's first trolleybus system opened on 18 July 1961, with two routes replacing a narrow-gauge steam railway, one running east from Castellón to Grao de Castellón and the other running southwest to Villarreal. Its fleet included four trolleybuses built by Pegaso. It closed in 1966.

== Second system ==
=== History ===
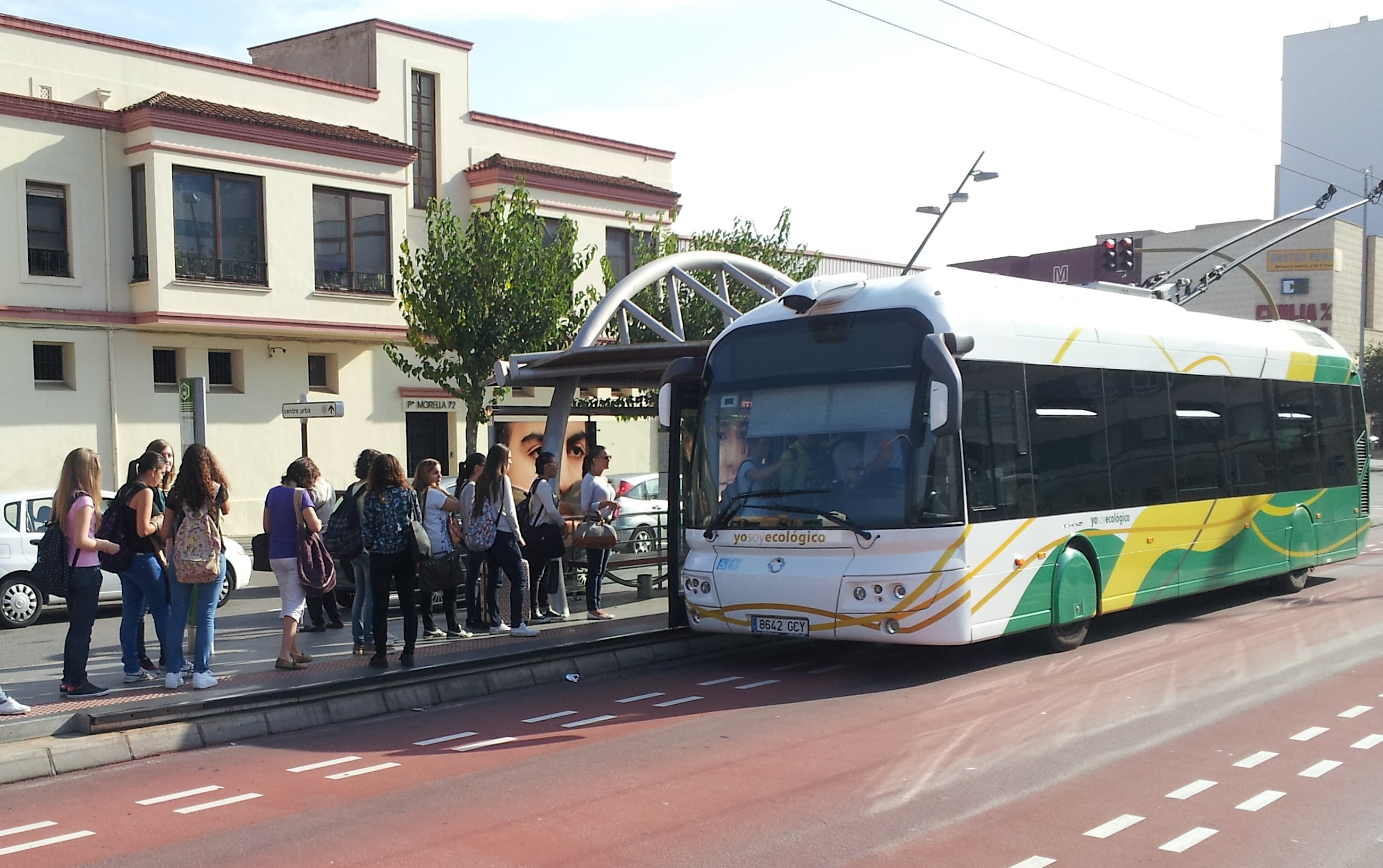
One of the current system's original fleet of Irisbus trolleybuses loading at a stop. In the foreground are markings on the roadway for the optical guidance system.

As part of its Strategic Infrastructure Plan, 2004–2010 (Catalan: Pla d'Infraestructures Estratègiques 2004–2010), the Generalitat Valenciana (the local government) proposed construction of a new busway route in Castellón that would use trolleybuses fitted with optical guidance equipment. It was to be named TVR-Cas (Transporte en Via Reservada – Castellón).

Construction of the new trolleybus system was underway by 2007, with an initial route between Jaume I University and Parque Ribalta.^{(ES)} Plans envisioned extensions to the surrounding towns of Benicàssim, Burriana, and Villarreal by 2009, but these were later shelved due to a lack of funding. Three Irisbus trolleybuses purchased for the first stage were delivered before the end of 2007. Earlier, starting in March 2007, trolleybus no. 1857 from the Lyon trolleybus system was borrowed and used for testing. The route crosses a new cable-stayed bridge over the Seco River, the 42-metre-tall (138 ft) Puente del Siglo XXI (or Pont del Segle XXI in Valencian), which was still under construction in February 2008, when the first test runs with the Irisbus vehicles started. The name of the service was changed from TVR-Cas to TRAM, for Transporte Metropolitano de la Plana, shortly before the line's 2008 opening. It is also designated as route T1.

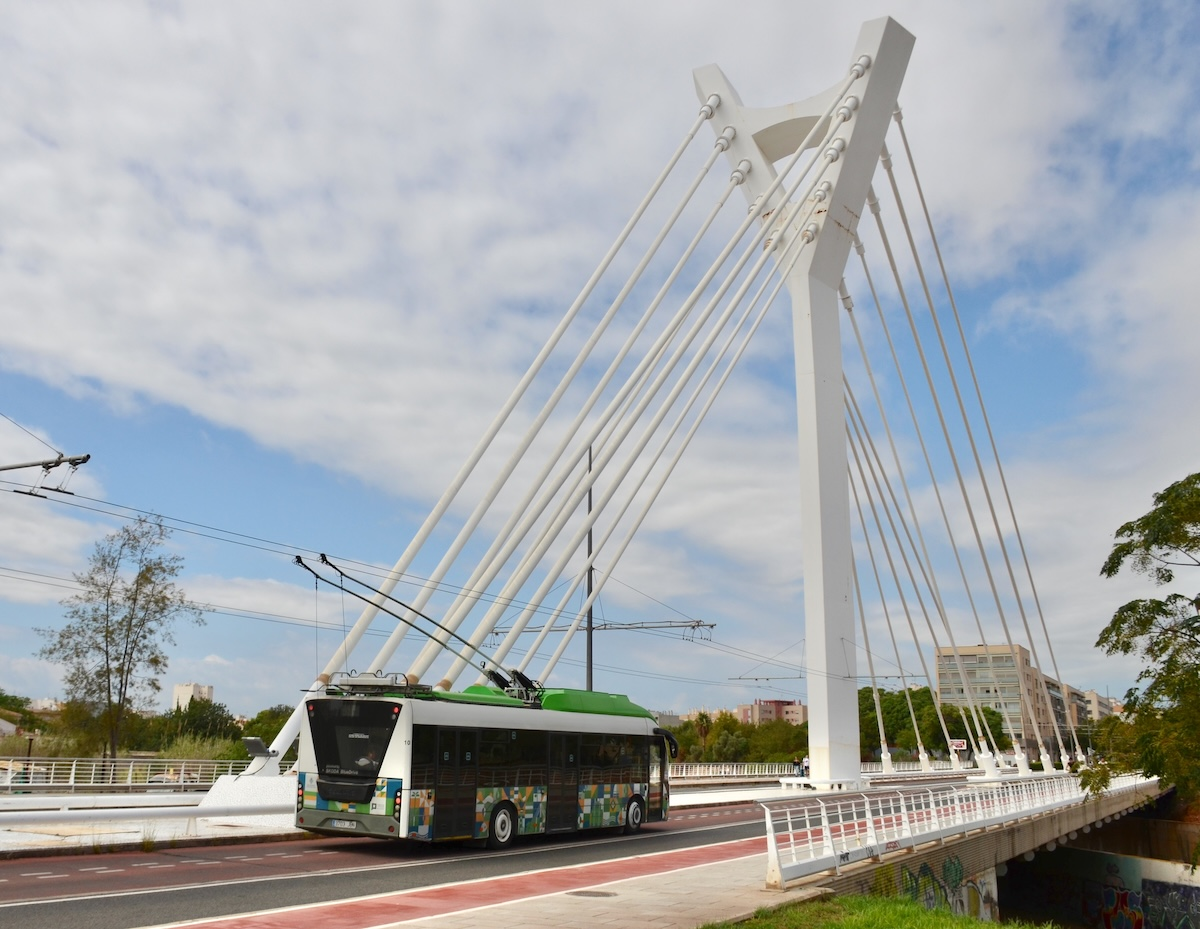
A trolleybus crossing the cable-stayed Puente del Siglo XXI (or Pont del Segle XXI)

The first section of the present one-route system, between Jaume I University and Parque Ribalta, measuring a little more than 2 km (1.2 mi) in length, opened on 25 June 2008. It was the first trolleybus service to operate in Spain since 1989, when the system in Pontevedra, the last of several earlier trolleybus systems that once operated in Spain, closed. The vehicles used optical guidance, and the stops feature platforms that are 27 cm (11 in) high and 25 m (82 ft) long.

A second phase had already been approved, and construction of a 6-kilometre-long (3.7 mi) extension east from Parque Ribalta (Ribalta Park) to Grao began in 2009, but was soon suspended because of financial issues, not resuming until 2012. Additional vehicles would be needed for the extended route, and in 2013 an order was placed with Solaris Bus & Coach for six Trollino 12 trolleybuses with "MetroStyle" bodies. Five of the six had been delivered by December 2014.

The 6 km (3.7 mi) extension east from Parque Ribalta to Grao opened for service on 20 December 2014. It was designed to include a section in the old town part of the city centre that was not fitted with overhead trolley wires and would be covered on auxiliary power (diesel engine, on the Irisbuses, or batteries on later vehicles). The Irisbus vehicles were not permitted to serve this section and continued to serve only the fully wired original section, which has a regular service of short-turn trips. A section of busway was built through Ribalta Park, but because of objections from the public, it was never opened, and the trolleybuses take a slightly less direct routing around the northern edge of the park – which section includes a bidirectional single bus lane along Paseo Ribalta.

Unlike the 2-kilometre-long (1.2 mi) original section, the new section only used optical guidance around stops. The first five Solaris vehicles were not even equipped with guidance equipment when delivered, so only the Irisbus vehicles used guidance at this stage, but the sixth and last trolleybus in the order was so-equipped at the factory in Poland. It was delivered to Castellón in autumn 2015, and it was planned to retrofit the other five Solaris trolleybuses with guidance equipment in Castellón.

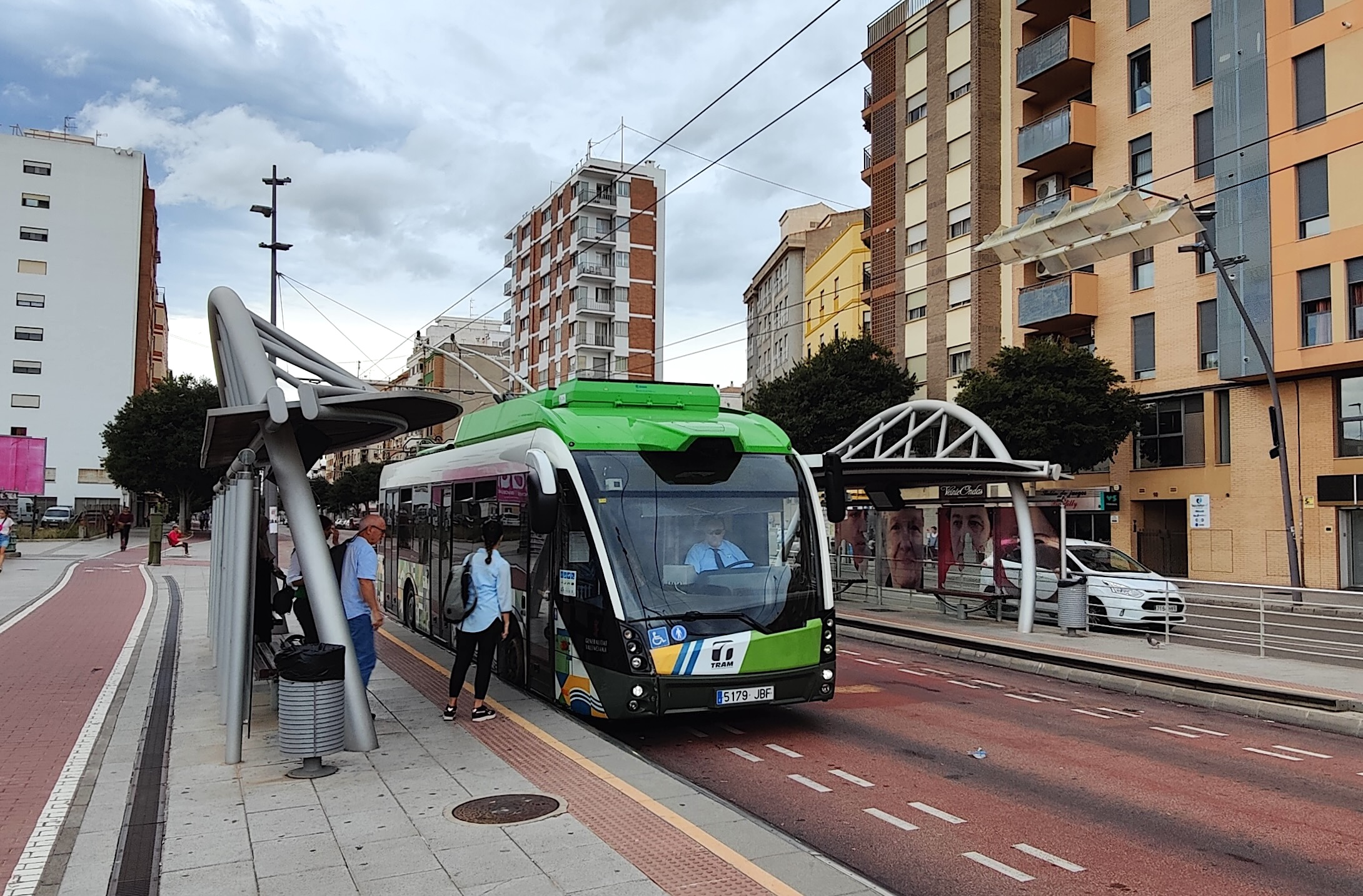
A trolleybus at a typical stop, here eastbound at Parque Ribalta

By 2019, two of the three 2007 Irisbus trolleybuses were out of service with defects and not expected to be repaired. By early 2024, the third and last Irisbus had also been withdrawn, leaving only the six Solaris trolleybuses in service. The short-turn trips became operated by diesel buses.

In March 2023, an order was placed for four battery buses for use on the "Tram" (trolleybus) line, and they were delivered in August 2024. Built by Irizar, they have optical-guidance equipment made by Siemens. In early July 2025, they still had not entered service, but testing finally began later that month, and they entered service around the beginning of September 2025, although still considered to be in a testing phase. It was planned to use the new battery buses to replace diesel buses running on a variant of the TRAM route that extends east of Grao, to Gurugú beach^{(CA)} (La Playa, or Platja) without overhead wires; although the trolleybuses are able to operate some distance without receiving power from overhead wires, the route extending to La Playa had been determined to be too long for the trolleybuses to cover on battery power.

In 2024, it was reported that the Generalitat Valenciana (the local government), which oversees the "TRAM" and had purchased the four battery buses, intends to convert the service fully to battery buses when the current operating contract expires in 2028, thereby discontinuing trolleybus service at that time.

=== Service ===
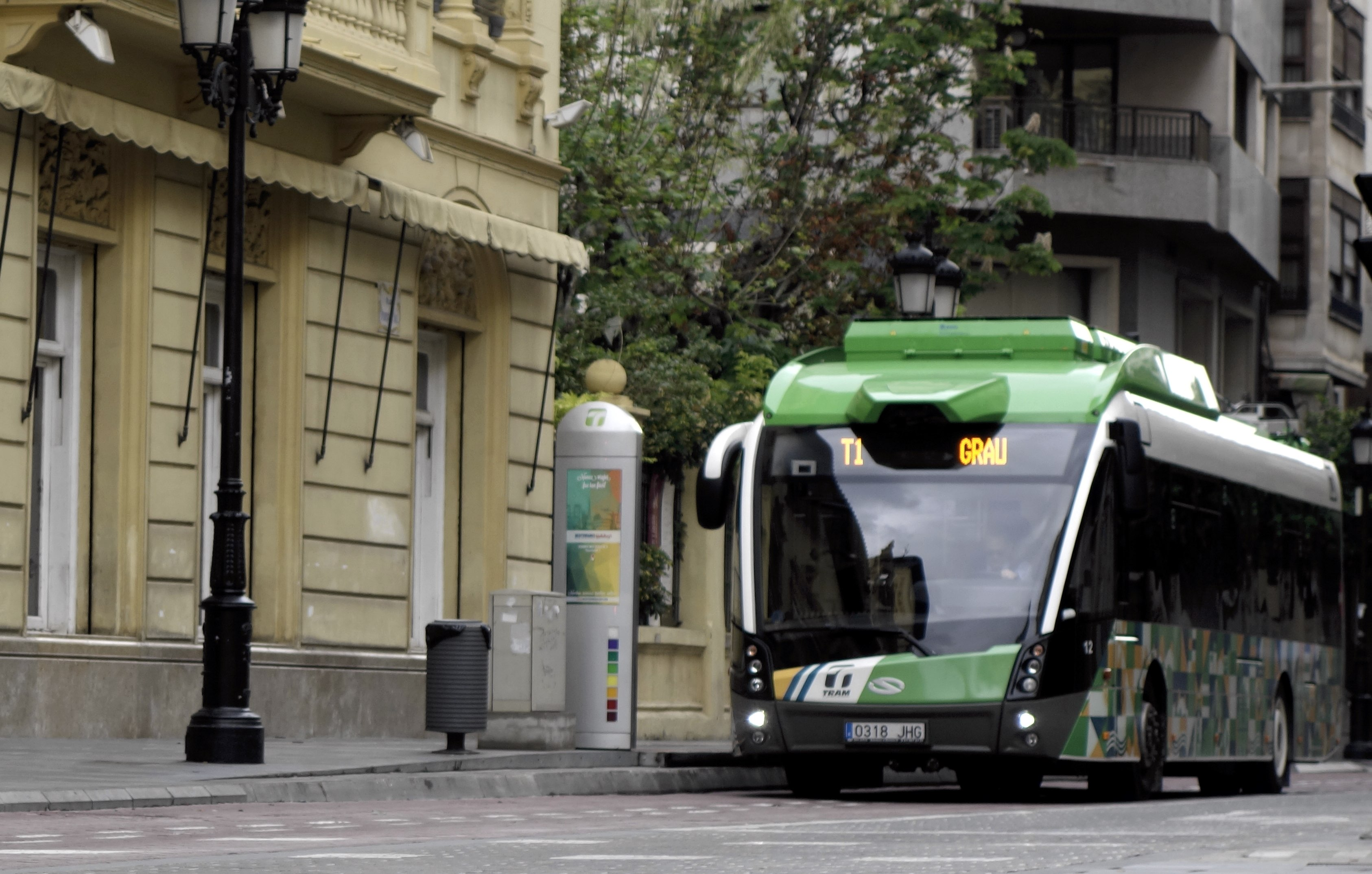
A trolleybus operating on battery power (with its trolley poles lowered), on the section of route in the city centre that is not equipped with overhead wires

- T1 Jaume I University (UJI) — Parque Ribalta – Grao

Route T1 is around 8 km (5.0 mi) long (7.7 km westbound, 8.2 km eastbound). In the city centre, a section around 2 km long is not equipped with overhead trolley wires, and the trolleybuses cover it on diesel power (Irisbus) or battery power (Solaris). Between the city centre and Grao, the route uses a busway in the middle of Avenida del Mar; on other sections, the trolleybuses generally operate in bus lanes adjacent to general-traffic lanes, but the route has a short length (200 m) of separate roadways (two single-width lanes) on the university grounds immediately east of the university terminus. In the old town, the routing followed by eastbound trolleybuses is a straight path from Calle Zaragoza to Avenida del Mar, along Calle Colón, whereas westbound trolleybuses follow a longer routing, via Plaza Borrull, Calle Escultor Viciano, and Avenida Rey Dom Jaime. The Castellón de la Plana railway station is served by the route, with its Estación Intermodal station.

On weekdays, regular short-turn trips are provided on the route's 2-km westernmost section, between the university and Parque Ribalta; these were running every eight minutes in 2015. In 2015, the full route to Grao had a scheduled 15-minute headway on weekdays (20 minutes on Saturdays, 30 minutes on Sundays), which had improved to a 12-minute headway by 2019. Service is reduced during the months of July and August each year, when the university holds fewer classes.

=== Fleet ===
==== Past fleet ====
The original fleet consisted of just three trolleybuses:

- 3 Irisbus Civis trolleybuses, built in 2007. Similar to Irisbus's Cristalis model but equipped for optical guidance. They were also equipped with auxiliary diesel engines for limited operation from the overhead wiring. Their assigned fleet numbers of 146–148 were not displayed on the exteriors of the vehicles (only registration numbers). Around 2015, they were renumbered 1, 3, and 2, respectively. The last active Irisbus vehicle (No. 1) was retired in early 2024.

==== Current fleet ====
- 6 Solaris Trollino 12 MetroStyle trolleybuses (with Škoda electrical equipment), Nos. 7–12, built in 2014 (No. 12 in 2015). Equipped with batteries for limited movement away from the overhead wiring.

== See also ==
- List of trolleybus systems in Spain
