= Trams in Medellín =

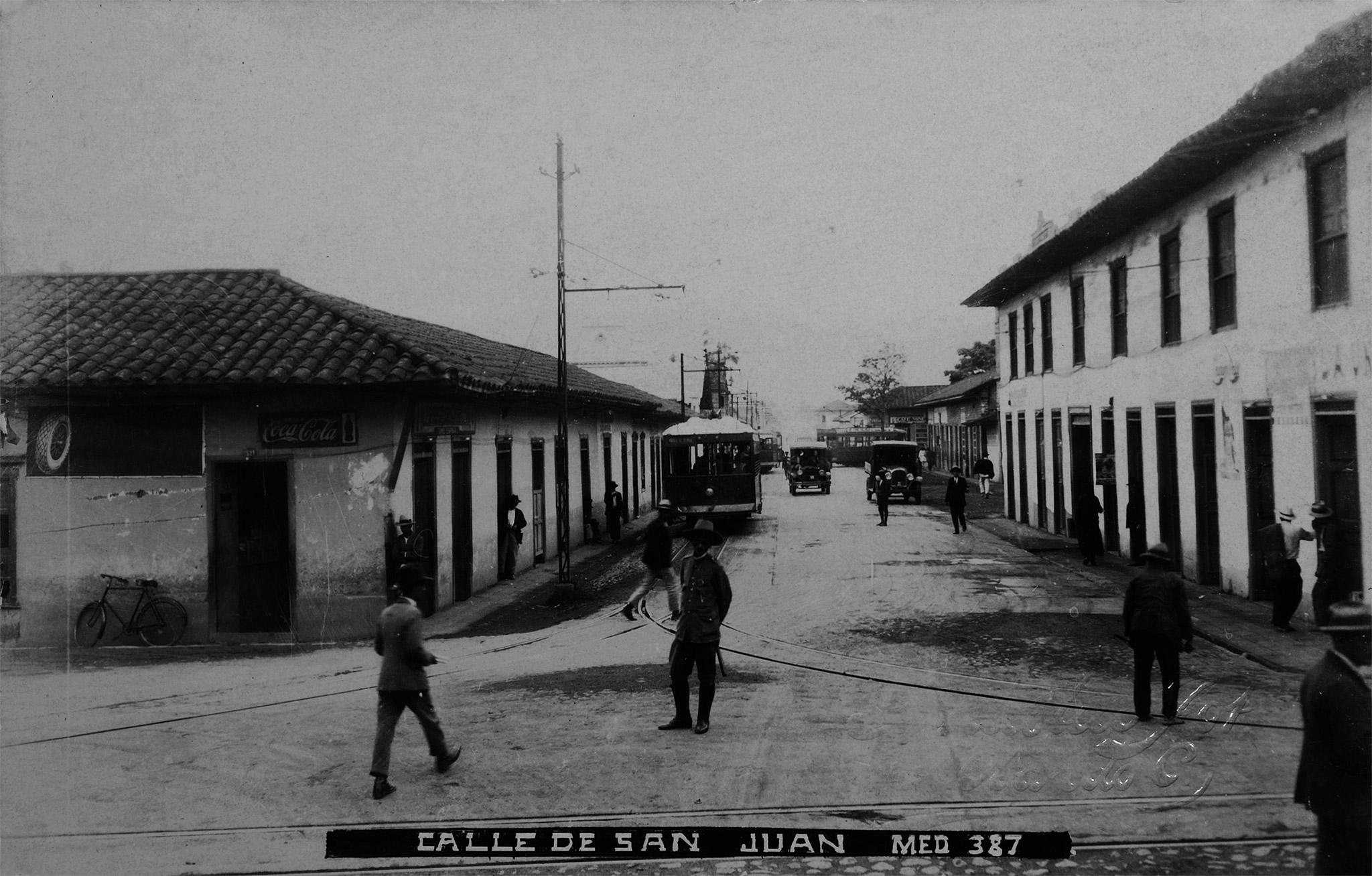
A tram on San Juan Street in Medellín (c. 1930)

The trams in Medellín returned in 2015.

== See also ==
- Ayacucho Tram
- Medellín Metro
