= Short Heath Park =

Public park in Birmingham, United Kingdom

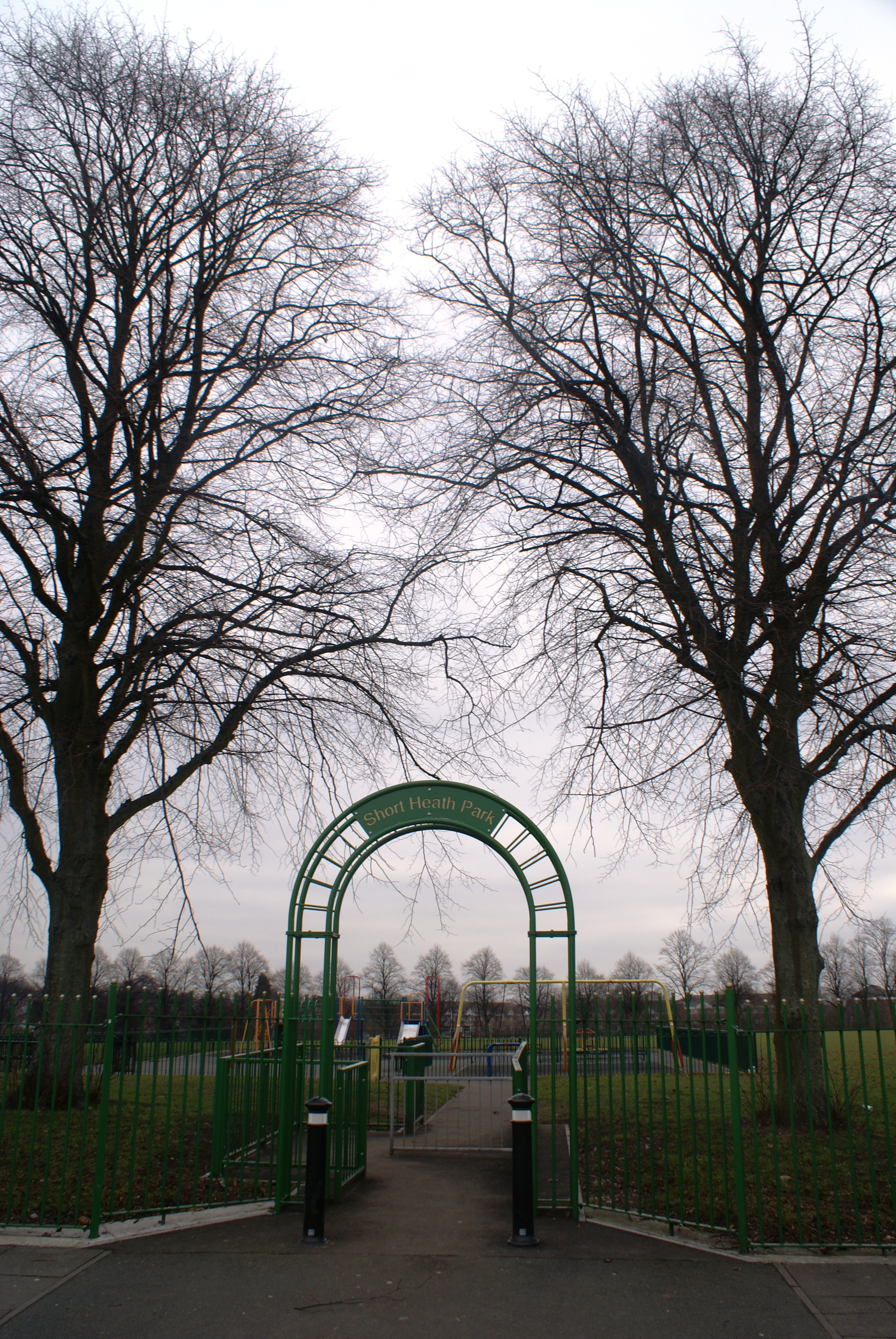
- Entrance to Short Heath Park
- Interactive map of Short Heath Park
- Type: Public park
- Location: Erdington, Birmingham, UK
- Coordinates: 52.5353°N 1.8471°W
- Area: 14.5 acres (0.059 km^{2})
- Operator: Birmingham City Council

Short Heath Park is a public park in the Short Heath area of Erdington, Birmingham, UK. It is located approximately 0.5 miles (0.80 km) north-west of Erdington railway station. Short Heath Park is located a short walk away from Erdington High street. Short Heath Park is approximately 14.5 Acres in size and Is operated by the Birmingham City council.

== Redevelopment ==
In 2009, Birmingham City Council's Parks and Nature Conservation department submitted a planning application for the park. The application, which was for the "erection of 1.6m high boundary railings with 3.3m high entrance archways" was approved subject to conditions on 1 December 2009. Development began in January 2010.
