= Metroplús =

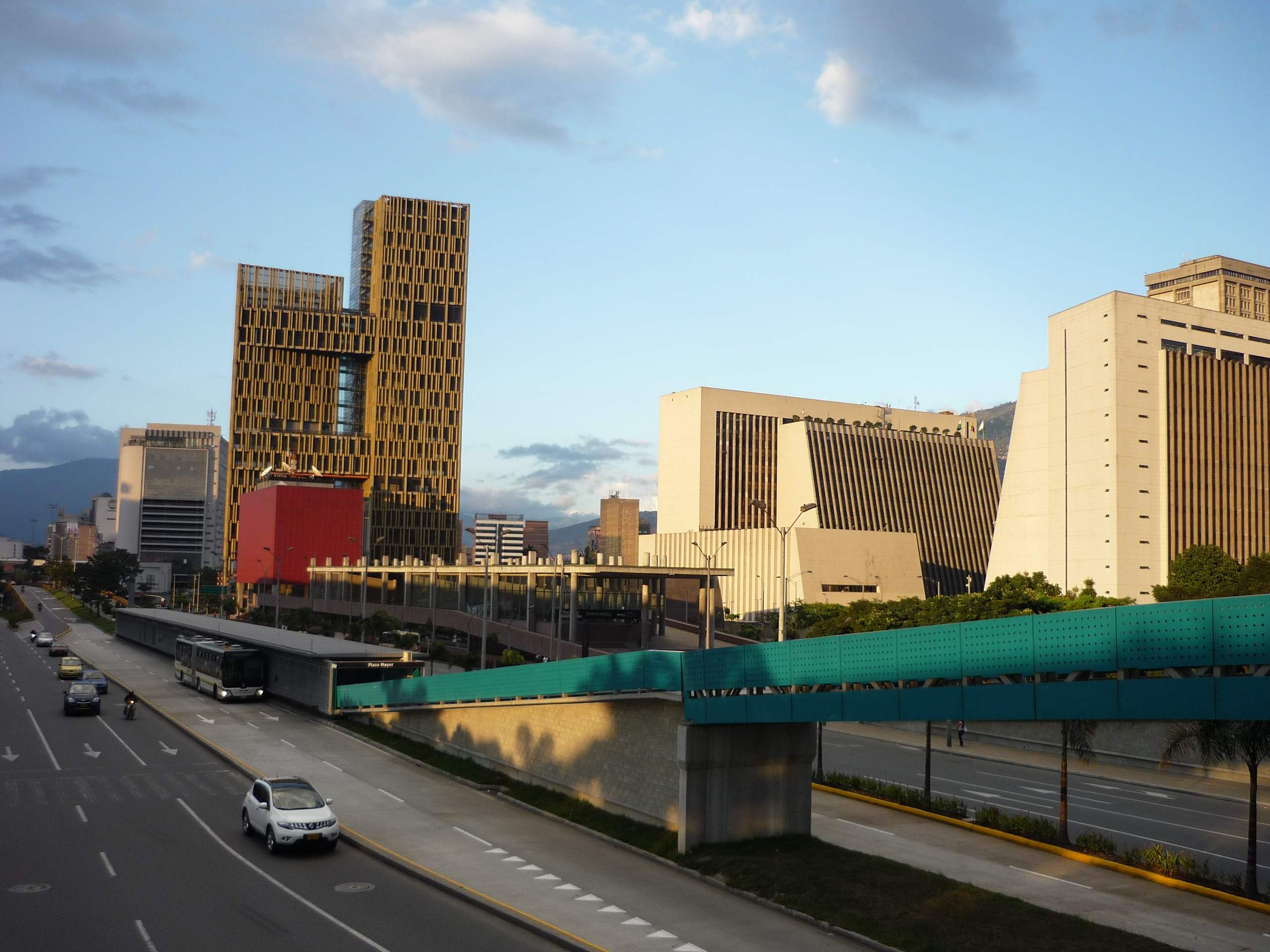
- Plaza Mayor station

Overview
- Area served: Medellín, Colombia
- Locale: Metropolitan Area of the Aburrá Valley
- Transit type: Bus rapid transit
- Number of lines: 3
- Line number: Line 1, Line 2 and Line O
- Number of stations: 63
- Annual ridership: 46 million (2024)
- Website: metroplus.gov.co

Operation
- Began operation: 22 December 2011; 14 years ago
- Operator: Metroplús SA
- Character: At-grade street running
- Number of vehicles: 31 articulated and 111 standard buses

Technical
- System length: 35 km (22 mi)
System map
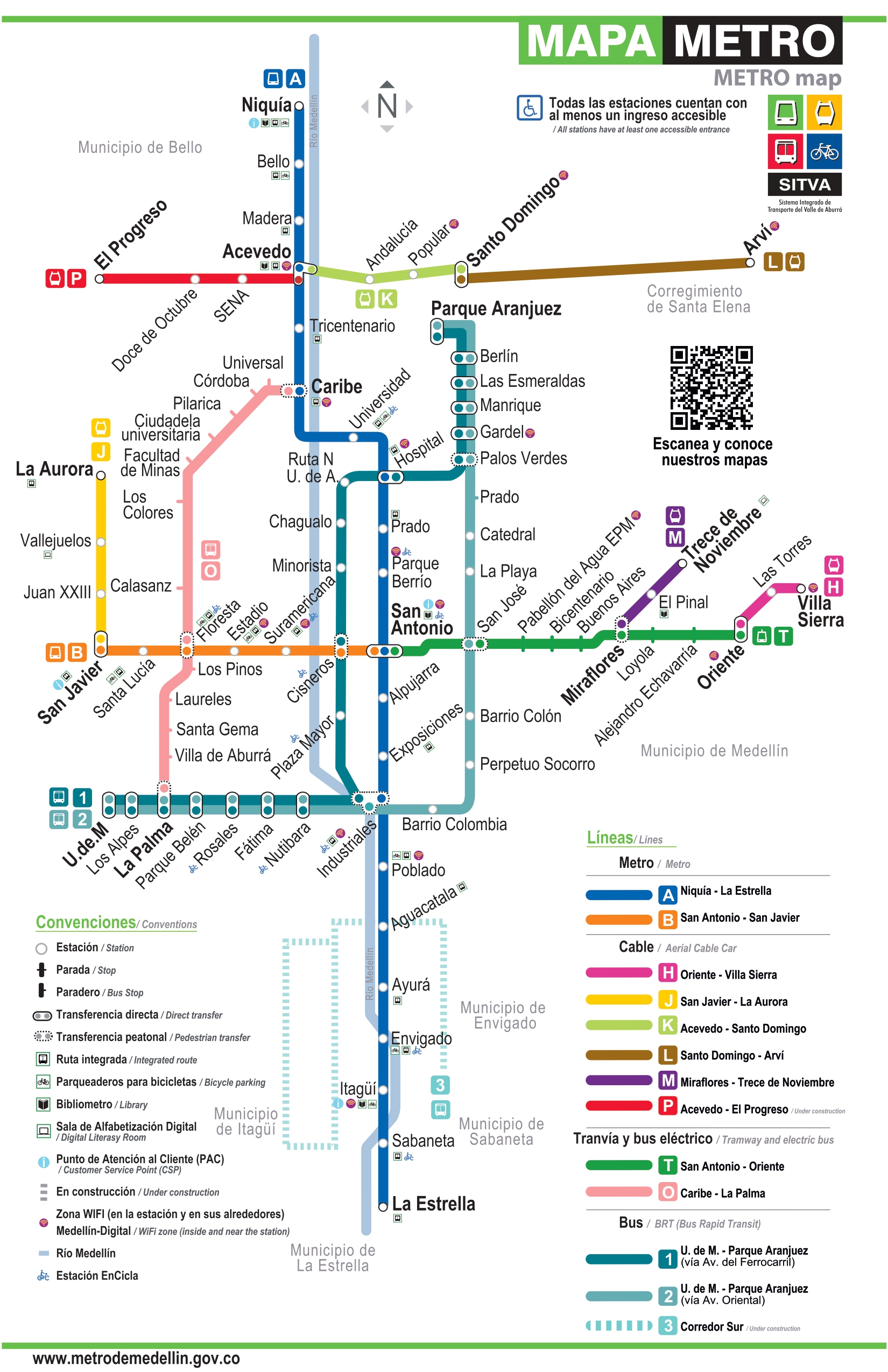

Metroplús is a bus rapid transit (BRT) system that serves Medellín, the capital of Antioquia. The system opened to the public on 22 December 2011. As of 2026, three lines totalling 35 km (22 mi) run throughout the city. It is part of the Aburrá Valley Integrated Transport System (Spanish: Sistema Integrado de Transporte del Valle de Aburrá, SITVA), along with the Medellín Metro, Ayacucho Tram, Metrocable, the minibus network called Sistema Integrado de Transporte (SIT) in Spanish and the bicycle-sharing system EnCicla.

== Network ==
The network has three operating lines: the original Line 1 and the more recent Line 2 and Line O. Line 1 has a dedicated bus lane and follows a west–north direction connecting the University of Medellín station with Parque Aranjuez station, over a distance of 12.5 km via the Railway Avenue. Line 2 runs parallel to and shares the same termini as Line 1, but uses a different route, mostly via the Eastern Avenue, between Industriales metro station and Palos Verdes station, over a distance of 13.5 km. Line O has a total length of 9.2 km, follows a south west - north east direction and connects La Palma station (shared with Lines 1 and 2) with Caribe metro station.

== See also ==
- List of bus rapid transit systems
- TransMilenio
