= Ayacucho Tram =

Tram in Medellín

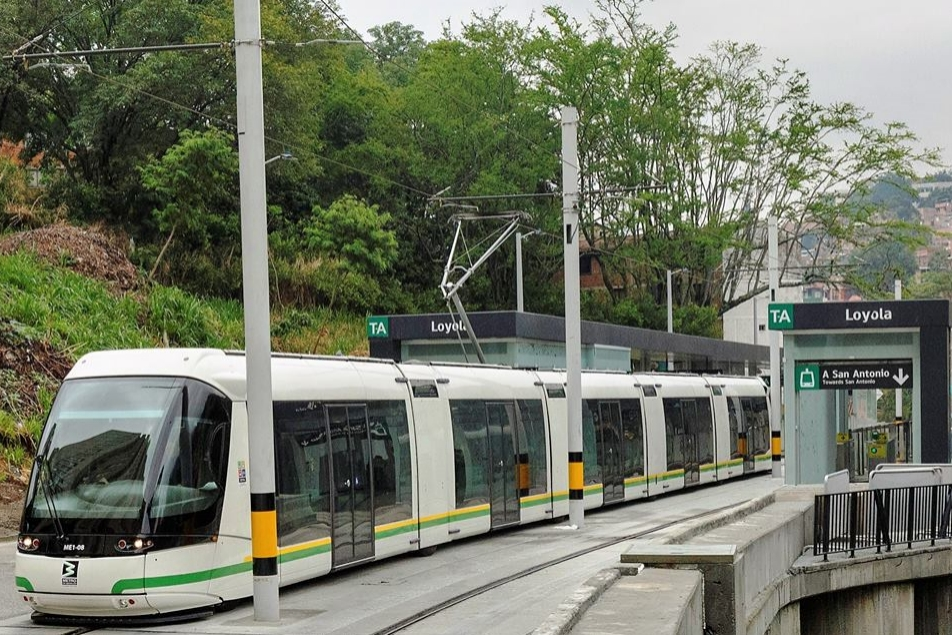
- Medellín rubber-tyred tram

Overview
- Status: Operational
- Owner: Medellín
- Locale: Medellín, Colombia
- Termini: San Antonio; Oriente
- Stations: 9
- Website: www.metrodemedellin.gov.co

Service
- Type: Translohr
- System: SITVA
- Services: 1
- Operator: Medellín Metro
- Ridership: 10.4 million (2025)

History
- Opened: 15 October 2015

Technical
- Line length: 4.3 km (2.7 mi)
- Num of tracks: 2
- Track gauge: None (Translohr system)
- Electrification: 750 V DC Overhead line
- Operating speed: 25 km/h (16 mph)

The Ayacucho Tram (or Medellín Tram; Spanish: Tranvía de Medellín) is a Translohr tram system that serves the Metropolitan Area of the Aburrá Valley in Medellín, Antioquia, Colombia. It started trial operations on 20 October 2015. The tramline consists of 9 stations with three of those allowing interchanges with the Medellín Metro and the Metrocable systems. The Ayacucho Tram is operated by Medellín Metro and is the only (rubber-tyred or otherwise) tram in Colombia.

Medellín once had a standard steel-wheeled tramway network. It first was opened as a horse tramway and was later converted to electric trams. Routes were built in stages, and the network reached its maximum size in 1945, served by a fleet of 61 tramcars. However, like most cities around the world during the 1950s and 1960s, the tram service was completely abandoned in 1951.

In the late 2000, plans to return trams to Medellín began to come together. The first contracts for the project, to be known as the Tranvía de Ayacucho (Ayacucho Tram), were signed in 2011. It was decided that the new Medellín tramway would uses Translohr vehicles, imported from France, as rubber-tyred trams would be able to handle the line's steep hills better than a conventional steel-wheeled tramway. Construction of the line began in 2012, and delivery of the Translohr vehicles began in 2014.

On 13 July 2015, the first test runs took place. Free, limited passenger service began on 15 October 2015, and on 31 March 2016 regular passenger operations officially started.

== History ==
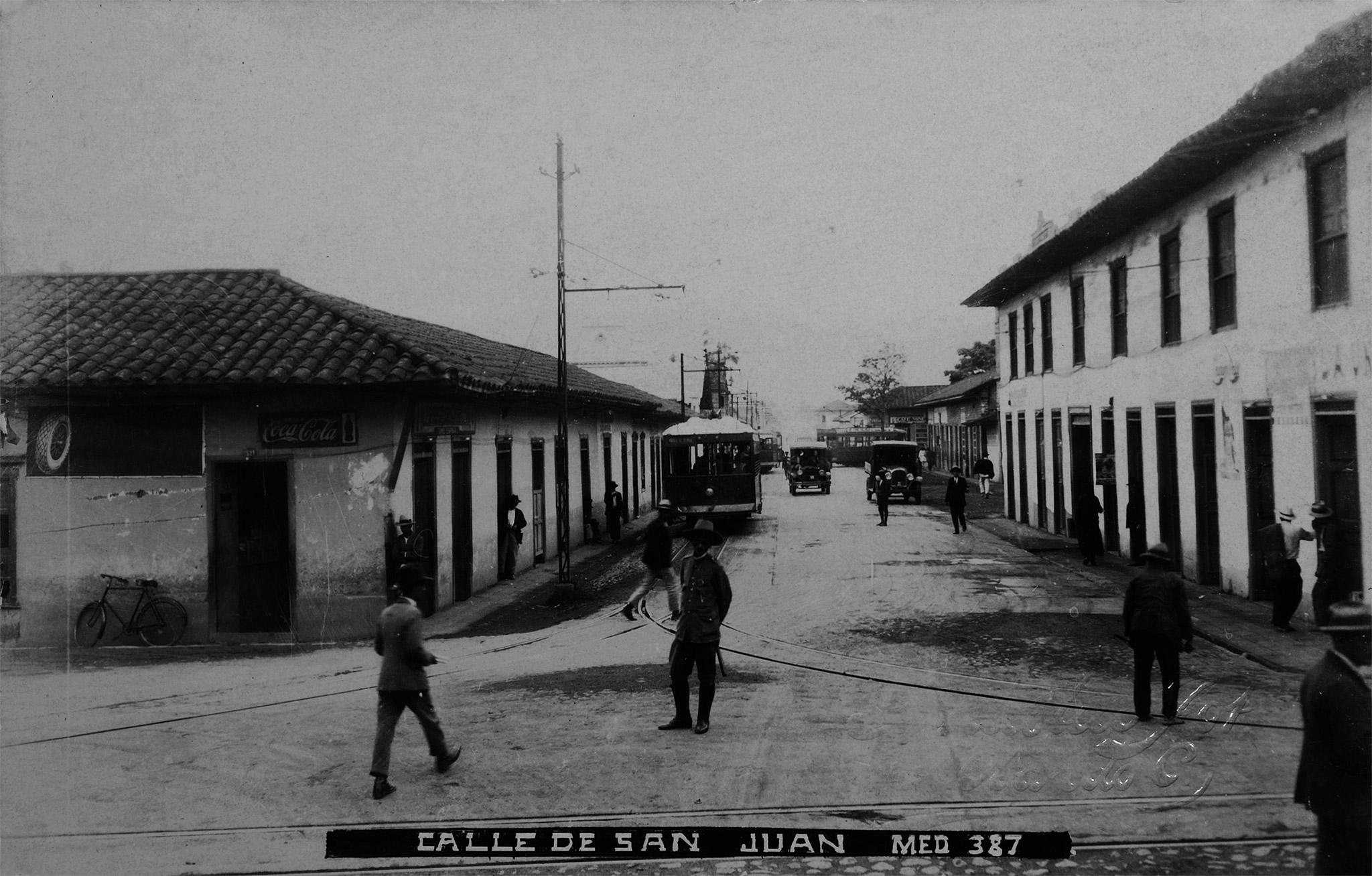
A tram on San Juan Street (c. 1930)

After the closure of the tram network in the 1950s, the people of Medellín thought the only unfashionable obstacle of smooth city traveling had been removed, and the city could move faster than before, but it proved false some years later. The uncontrolled increase in motor vehicles like buses, taxicabs, and private cars started choking the streets of Medellín. Like most South American countries, Colombia was suffering under many problems typically seen in developing countries, including pollution, traffic jam, illegal migration, low literacy and a booming population. The population growth of Medellín led to increasing number of private cars finding their way to the streets, jamming traffic in the city. The city even became slower than before the ending of tram operations. Beginning in the 1980s, these problems grew severe, and by the mid-1990s, the inhabitants of Medellín realized that the unbridled use of private cars and the closure of the old tram had been a mistake.

A metro system was opened in 1995, using a small part of former tram network, and gradually two metro routes were constructed. But for many low density areas, this was not an ideal solution, so the metro was not extended throughout all neighborhoods of Medellín.

Many cities around the world like Tunis, Algiers, Sydney, Buenos Aires, Shanghai, Dublin, Edinburgh, Athens, etc. all faced similar problems at the time, and had opted to reintroduce a tram network. Inspired by these examples, the city of Medellín also decided to return the tram.

Trying to fix the error of closing the former tram network, the government started to initiate measures to decrease pollution as soon as possible. Downtown Medellín was already served by the metro, but the public transportation in eastern Medellín was not sufficient. To resolve this challenge, the transport authority decided in 2015 to construct the first tramway in the Miraflores area, which lies on the eastern side of the main city.

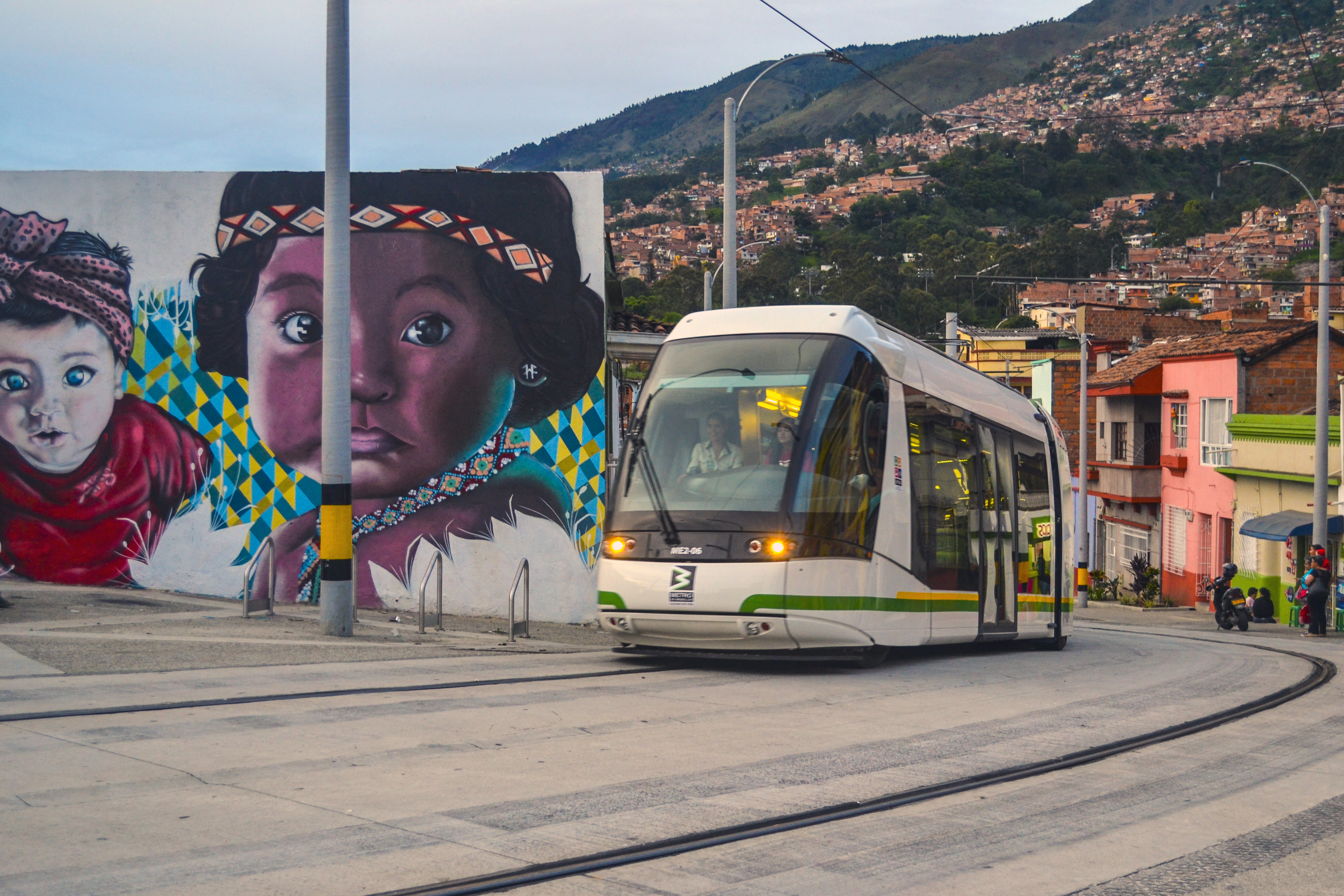
A tram turning from Carrera 29 onto Calle 49 (Av. Ayacucho), a steep section, in May 2016

On 13 May 2011 the city signed a contract with Lohr Industrie of France (acquired by Alstom in 2012) to build a Translohr line between the San Antonio metro junction and the east side of the town – a sort of eastward continuation of metro route B. A Translohr vehicle resembles a tram and draws power from overhead wires, but runs on rubber tyres and is guided by a center rail. It was decided to use a rubber-tyred system due to the elevations in this area. A Translohr vehicle should be ideal for climbing the 12% grade on Calle 49 – also known as Avenida Ayacucho – which was the path of the Buenos Aires tram line until 1951 (see Trams in Medellin). From two points on the line aerial cableways (teleféricos, Seilbahnen), each with two sections, the line carries passengers even higher into the hills. Construction of the new "tramway" began in 2012.

The first of the 12 Translohr vehicles arrived from France in July 2014. Metro de Medellín carried out the first test runs on Monday, 13 July 2015. The line is operated by Metro de Medellín, although it is not a metro.

=== Timeline summary ===
- 1951 - The last conventional tram ran.
- 2011 - The decision was taken to construct a rubber-tyred tram line.
- 2012 - Construction officially started.
- 2016 - Commercial service started on 31 March.

== Features ==
The modern tram routes completely run on unreserved tracks and in the middle of the road. Due to rubber-tyres, it is not possible to lay tracks on grass, as they can only be built on concrete road. The tram runs through many numerical avenues via Buenos Aires, Miraflores, Alejandro Echevarria and connects the city center to the eastern part of the city. All stops have side platforms except for both termini, which have island platforms.

=== Fleet ===
Rolling stock was manufactured by Translohr. All trams are low-floor and fully air-conditioned. Each tramcar has five sections.

=== Depot and termini ===
The only tram depot is at Miraflores. Termini are San Antonio, and Oriente.

=== Alignment and interchanges ===
The modern tram route runs completely on concrete roadway. It has an interchange with Medellín Metro Lines 1 and 2 at San Antonio station.

=== Practical information ===
- Total length – 4.3 km.
- Opened – 31/3/2016.
- Number of Stops – 9,
- Number of route – 1.
- Number of Tramcars – 12

== Stations ==
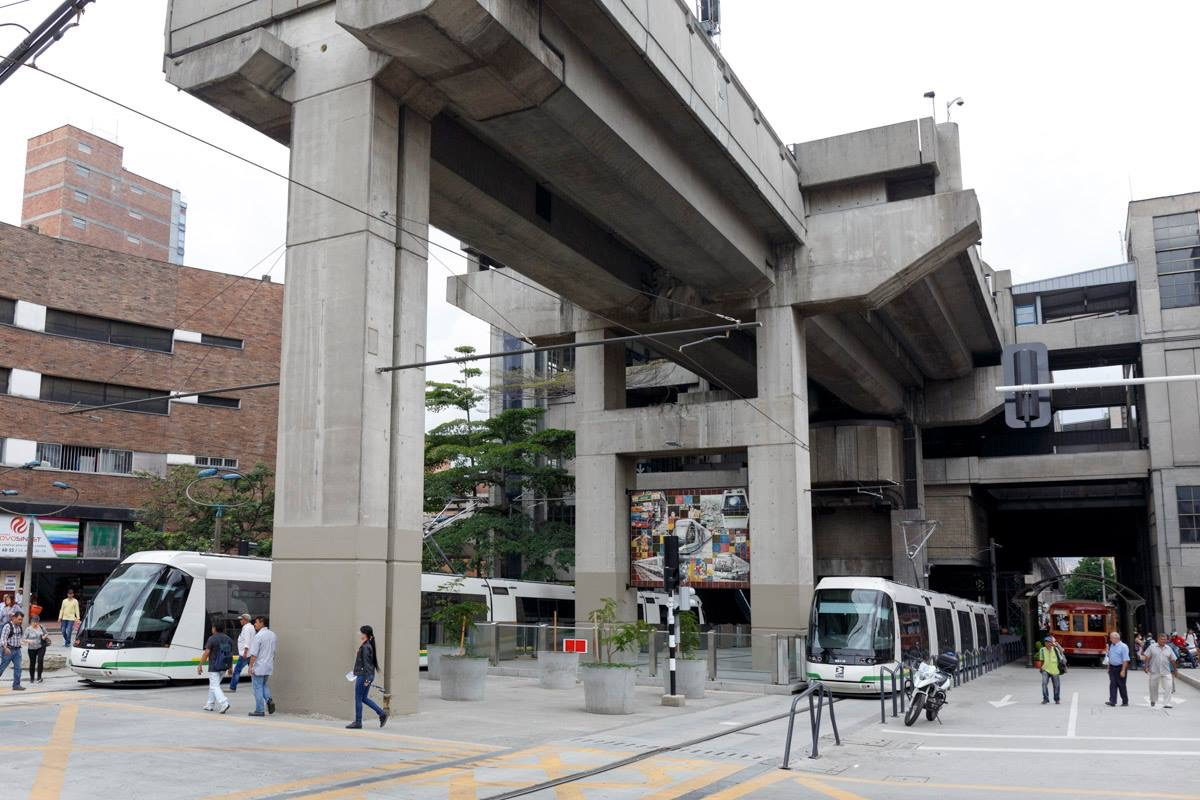
The line's San Antonio terminus, located underneath the San Antonio metro station, with one Translohr car arriving and another (at left) departing. An old first-generation tramcar is on display at the far right.

The modern tram runs from the San Antonio Square to the Oriente neighbourhood of Medellín.

- San Antonio Station
- San José Station
- EPM Water Pavilion Station
- Bicentenario Station
- Buenos Aires Station
- Miraflores Station
- Loyola Station
- Alejandro Echavarría Station
- Oriente Station

== Fare system ==
A payment before entering the tram is made with either the Civic Card, which is a rechargeable electronic transport title, using an RFID system or with a contactless smart card, which is detected by the readers from a distance of about 8 cm. It is one of the means of payment to use the Integrated Transport System of the Aburrá Valley (SITVA), which allows a greater speed in the entries by tourniquet and in the time of loading and reloading of the card. The process can be carried out by Colombians presenting their citizenship card and by foreigners presenting their alien registration card or passport, in customer service points.

== Proposed expansion ==
It is planned to construct a tram line running from the Aguacatala metro station to the Caribe metro station, providing connections in-between to Metroplús as well as halting at the Floresta metro station. The number 80 would be used to designate this line.

Mayor Federico Gutiérrez in his campaign also proposed as a mobility proposal to build another corridor using the same tram technology connecting the Aguacatala station with Palos Verdes, crossing Avenue 34 until Palmas, and the continuing further down the avenue, crossing the Ayacucho tram before arriving at its terminal. The tram route would also provide a connection with Metroplús.

== See also ==
- Medellín Metro
- List of rubber-tyred tram systems
- Trams in Medellin - the city's first-generation tramway network
