= Short Heath, Birmingham =

Suburban area of Birmingham, England

Coordinates: 52.5317°N 1.8581°W

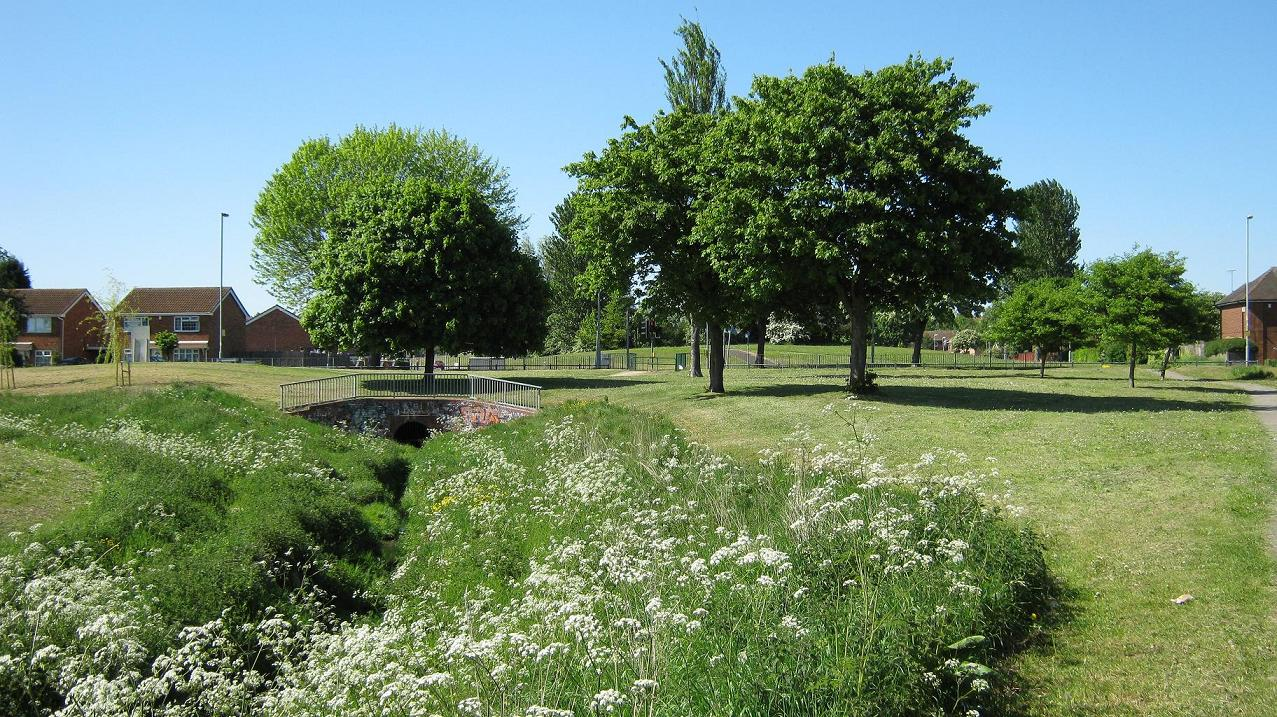
A recreational area in Short Heath

Short Heath is an area of Birmingham, England near to Erdington. The area's postcode is B23.

== Features ==
- Short Heath Park
