= The Deuce (transit bus service) =

Transit bus service in Las Vegas, Nevada

Deuce on The Strip

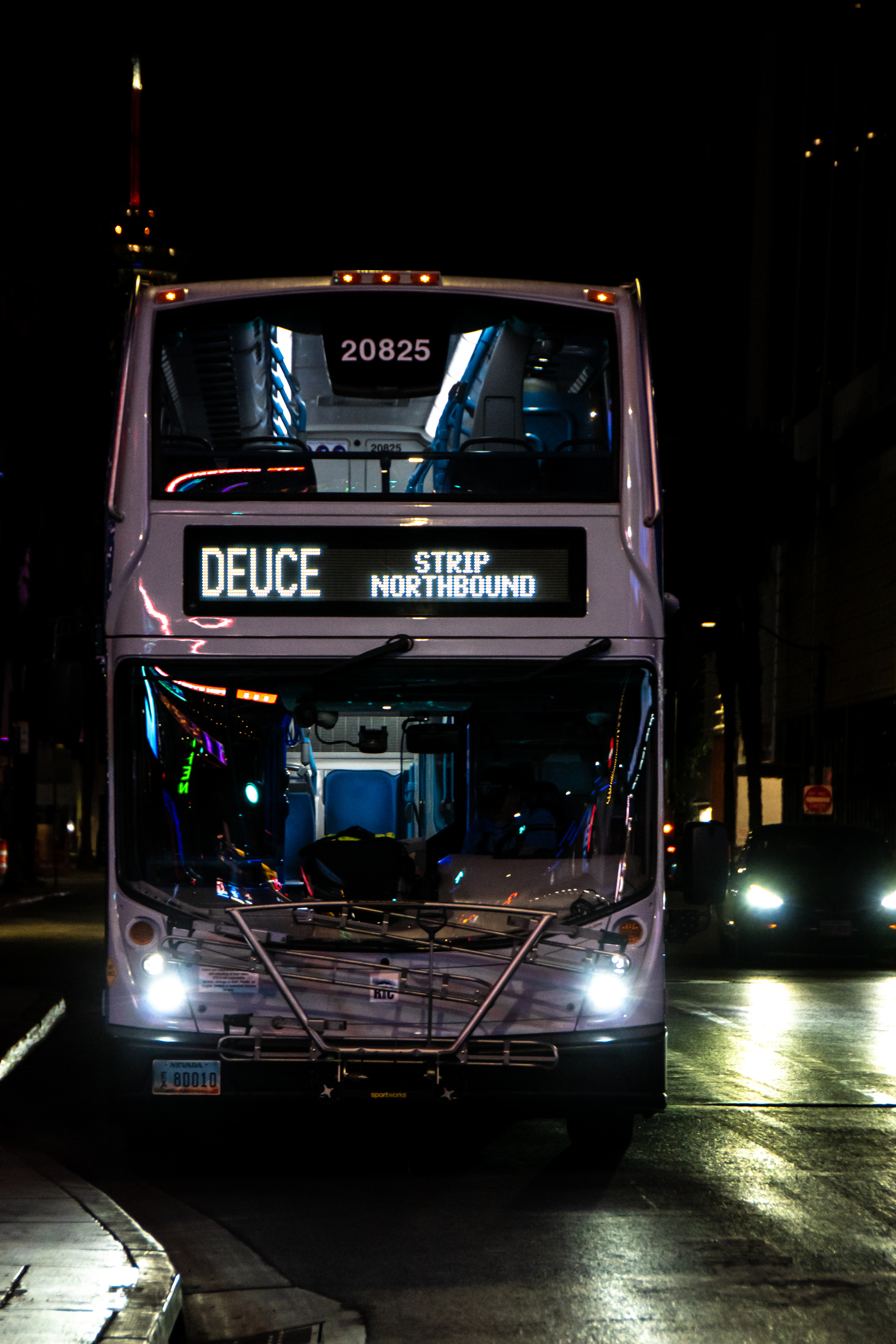
- A Deuce bus at the Fremont Street Experience in 2025
- Parent: Regional Transportation Commission of Southern Nevada
- Founded: October 27, 2005 Deuce service
- Headquarters: SMF
- Locale: Las Vegas
- Service area: Las Vegas Strip
- Service type: Tourist Route
- Alliance: RTC Transit
- Stations: SSTT & BTC
- Fleet: 40 Double Stair Alexander Dennis Enviro500s
- Daily ridership: 11647 (2021)
- Fuel type: Diesel
- Operator: transdev Transit America

The Deuce is a transit bus service serving the Las Vegas metropolitan area. Operated by RTC Transit, it began service on October 27, 2005. Originally The Deuce meant four things: (1) buses on the route were double decked; (2) the one-way fare was $2; (3) the route served the two primary gaming areas, the Strip and Downtown; and (4) the first batch of vehicles bought primarily for the service were assigned fleet numbers starting with "2". Although the double decker buses also serve other local routes and the price is no longer $2, the name The Deuce on the Strip is used by RTC to emphasize that the route refers to just the tourist route. In FY2023, The Deuce had an annual ridership of 5,754,225. The Deuce operates 24 hours a day.

== Background ==
Before the Deuce's debut, the Las Vegas Strip corridor was served by route 301, which ran between Downtown Las Vegas and the former Vacation Village resort. It was also accompanied by its express counterpart, route 302. (When the transit authority was branded as Citizens Area Transit (or CAT), it categorized routes serving the Strip under the 300's.)

In March 2010 a new bus rapid transit line connecting the Strip to downtown Las Vegas and Town Square and the South Strip Transfer Terminal became operational. This new 11 mile service was called ACE Gold Line and is similar to the Metropolitan Area Express BRT Line which had been operating since June 30, 2004. Due to a lawsuit by Ace Cab, the line was rebranded as the Gold Line. On November 7, 2010, it was rebranded to be known as the Strip and Downtown Express (SDX). The SDX bus was discontinued due to impacts to revenue from the COVID-19 pandemic.

Previously, RTC planned to shorten The Deuce on the Strip from the current 9.3 miles to just the 5 miles of the Strip from Mandalay Bay Casino to Palace Station on Sahara Avenue. This would have been the first time in 45 years (including Las Vegas Transit System) that the main Strip corridor route had undergone a major route change and be shortened. However, the first week of the service change, the northern portion of the route was reinstated with buses continuing to serve the Downtown Transportation Center, while still ending at Mandalay Bay the hours that the SDX operated. When the SDX was cancelled, buses returned to the Deuce's original route, from South Strip Transit Terminal to Fremont Street.

As of 2020, the fare for the Las Vegas Strip is $6 for a two-hour pass, $8 for a 24-hour pass, or $20 for a 72-hour pass.

== Fleet ==
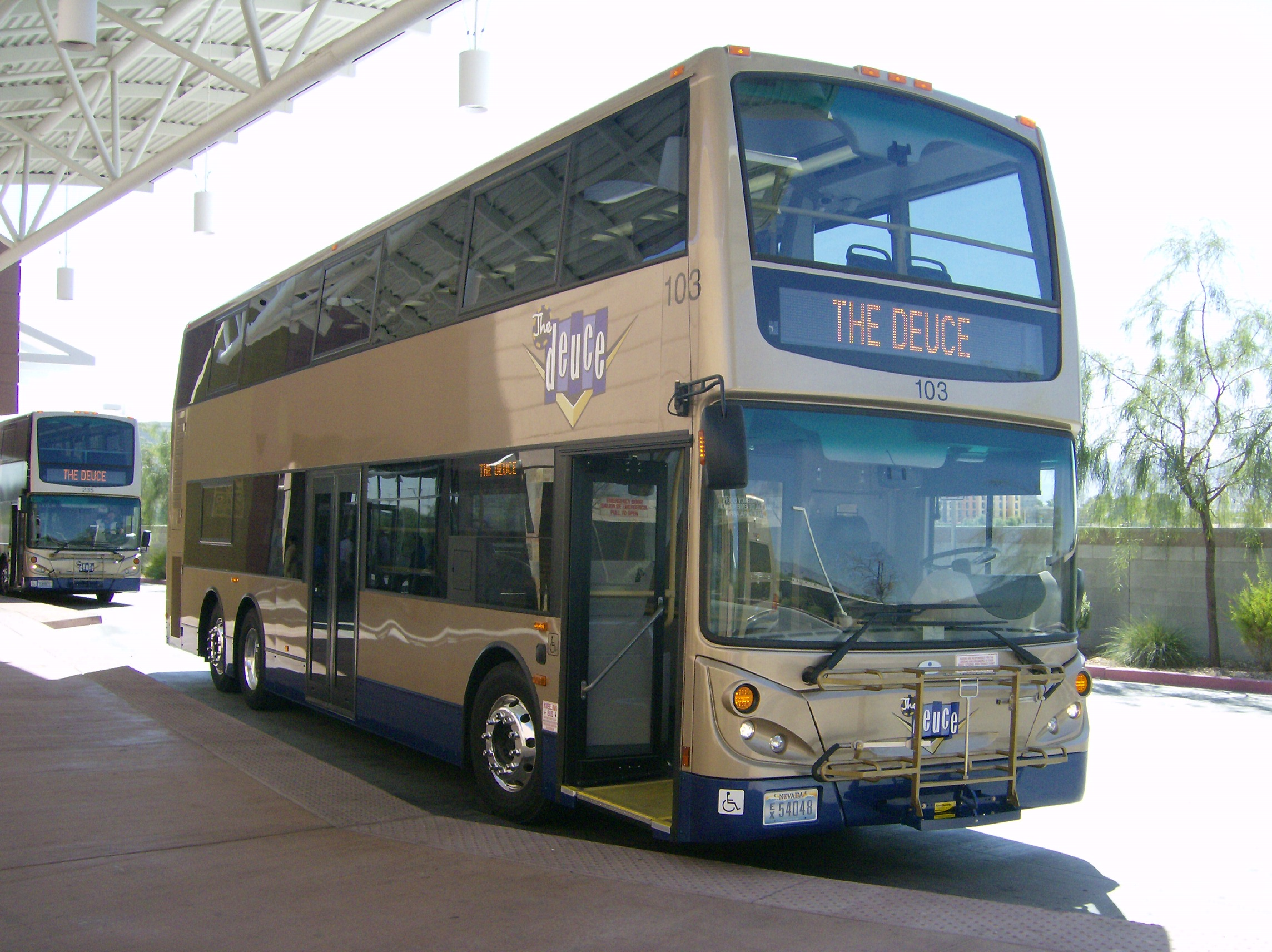
A 2007 Deuce bus making its first-run debut at the South Strip Transfer Terminal.

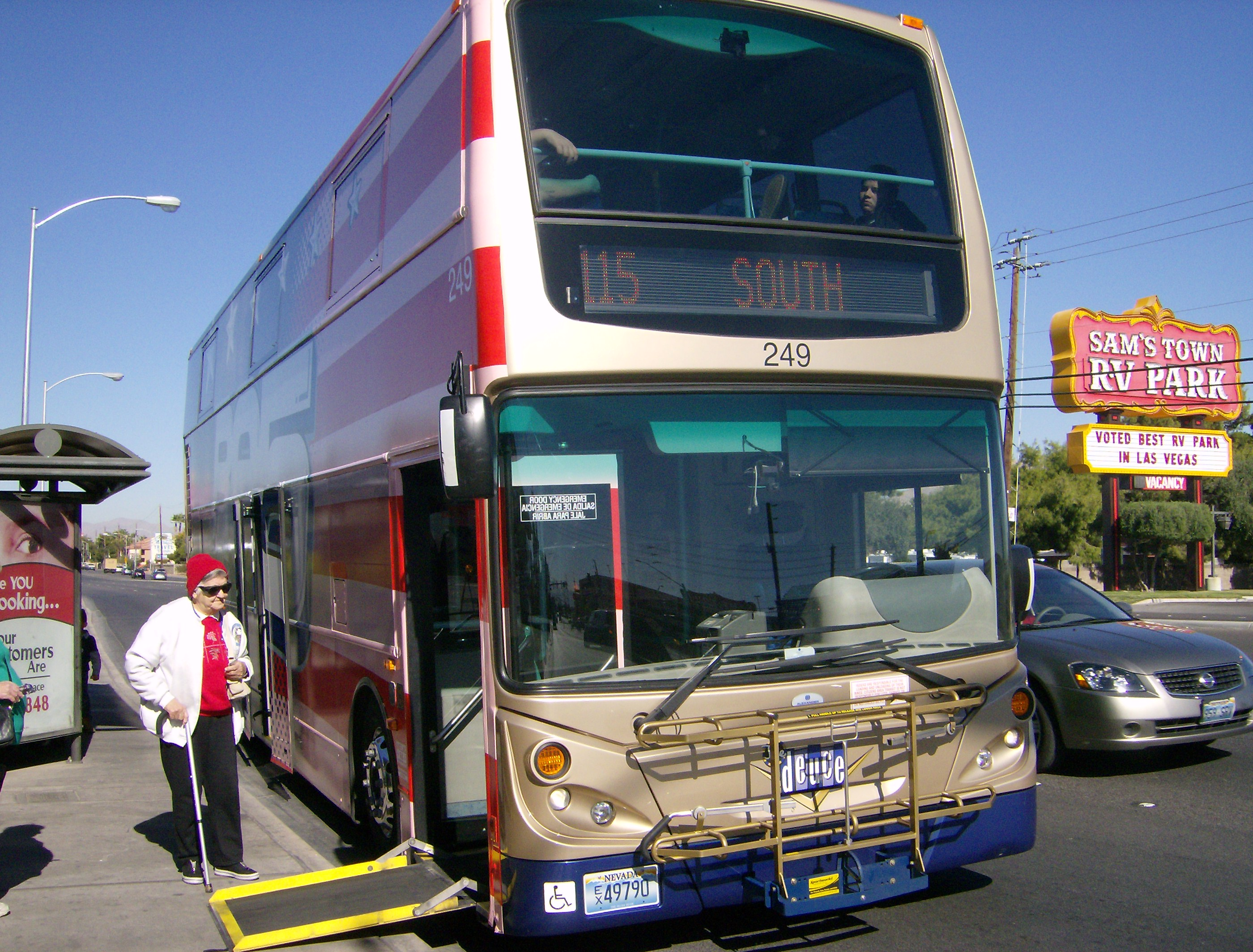
An Original 200 Series Deuce bus on the Nellis route 115 loading a wheelchair.

The route operates using Alexander Dennis Enviro500 vehicles built by the British manufacturer Alexander Dennis. They each seat 27 people on the lower deck, 53 on the upper deck, and are 42 feet long. RTC Transit is one of six transit agencies that operate double-decker buses in the United States.

In 2006, the RTC announced that they purchased 40 more double-deckers that arrived in Spring 2007, and another 40 that arrived in 2008. These new vehicles replaced the original 50 that have been serving the Strip. The original vehicles were reassigned to local routes (height permitting). These new Deuces are special in that they have 2 staircases, one in the current position, and a second one in the back. They are also 2 feet longer than the present double deckers, and have earned the nickname "Superdeuce."

Since January 2008, 80 new double deckers have arrived with half of that order featuring the reconfigured 42 ft, double staircase bus. The double staircase buses are assigned mostly to The Strip, while some, as well as all of the 40 ft double deckers are assigned to local routes. Although rare, some of the 40 ft vehicles will find their way onto The Strip route as a last resort.

In 2020, the RTC made a purchase of 40 more double deckers that has slowly replaced the 80 older double deckers over time, with the last of the double deckers from 2008 and 2007 retiring in 2024.

In 2025, a new Alexander Dennis plant was constructed in Las Vegas, and several more new double deckers will be built in that plant and used for the Deuce.
