= Metropolitan Area Express (Las Vegas) =

Former bus rapid transit route in the Las Vegas Valley

MAX Line: Las Vegas Boulevard North

Overview
- System: RTC Transit
- Operator: MV Transportation
- Vehicle: 10 Irisbus Civis
- Status: Former Service Route
- Began service: June 30, 2004
- Ended service: February 20, 2016 (11 years)

Routes
- Routes: 501
- Locale: Las Vegas, Nevada
- Start: Bonneville Transit Center
- End: Craig Road South Station (Nellis Air Force Base)
- Length: 7 miles (11 km)
- Stations: 22

Service
- Ridership: 195,203 (June 2008)

The Metropolitan Area Express, or MAX, was a bus rapid transit (BRT) line owned by the Regional Transportation Commission of Southern Nevada and operated by MV. MAX began operations on June 30, 2004. The area served extended between the Downtown Transportation Center and North Las Vegas. On February 21, 2016, the Metropolitan Area Express (MAX) was discontinued, with additional services added to other RTC routes.

The route ran on a 12-minute frequency during the day and 20 minutes at night using only ten vehicles purchased from Irisbus in France. These vehicles could hold a passenger load of 131 passengers. All fare payment was done off the vehicle at the stations. Special ticket vending machines were at every station, where passengers had to pay fare before boarding, as there was no fare box on board. Once on board, fare enforcement officers were at hand to check bus passes, which are issued by the TVM upon payment. The Irisbus "Civis" buses had optical guidance equipment and a driver's seat positioned in the center, and otherwise were essentially the same as that manufacturer's "Cristalis" model.

The BRT service was chosen by the RTC over light rail service due, in part, to costs of building and maintaining light rail. The RTC felt it was better to operate rubber tire transit rather than to have an expensive light rail system that would be too much to operate.

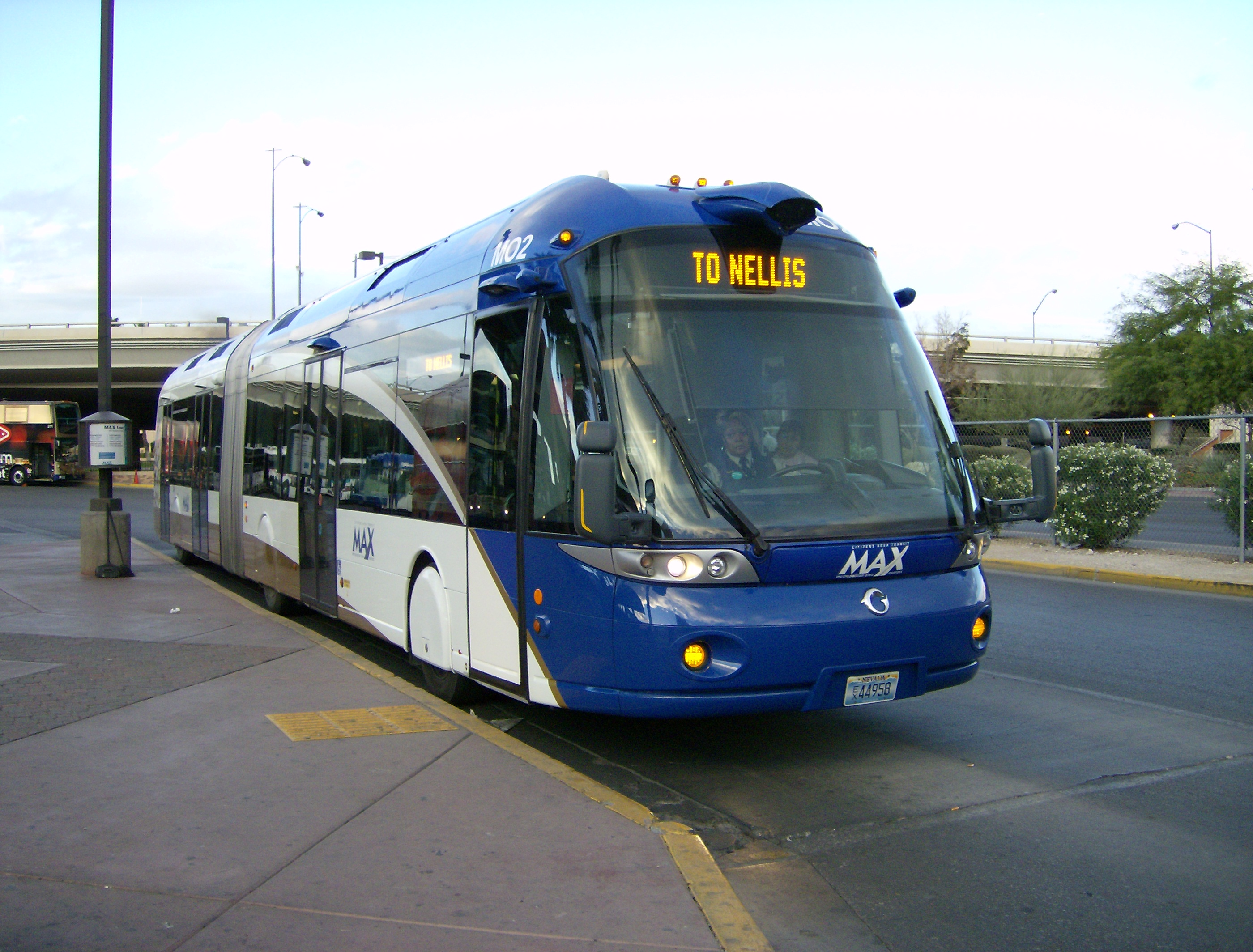
An Irisbus Civis serving the MAX line at the DTC

== Safety record ==
All operators that drove MAX vehicles were required to have two years of preventable-free service. This means that a driver could not have had a preventable incident or accident for two years while driving for RTC Transit, the fixed route system also owned by the RTC and operated by MV. Then, operators were taken through training once again to be "MAX Certified".

== Expansion/ACE BRT ==
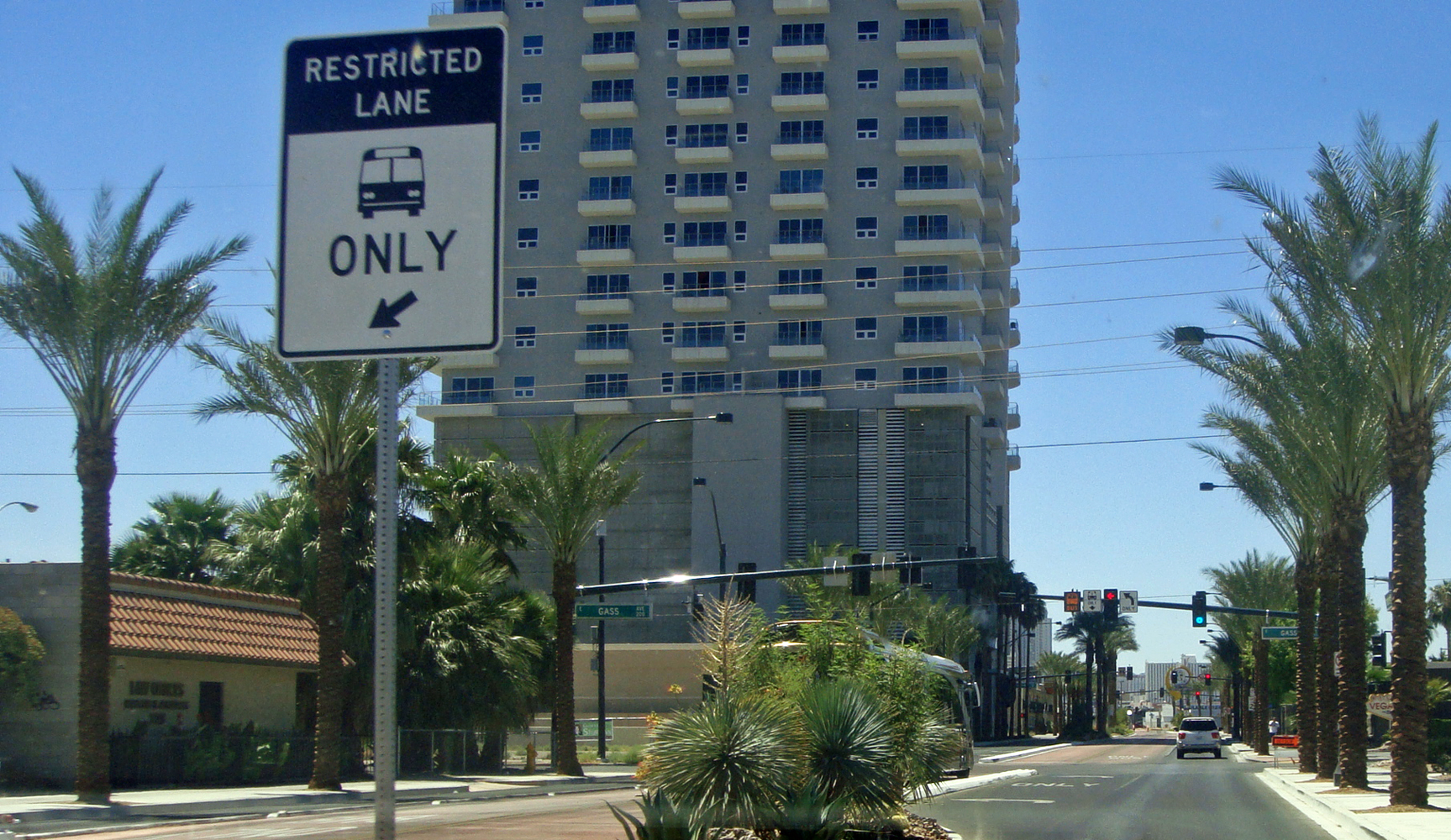
RTC express BRT line in Las Vegas

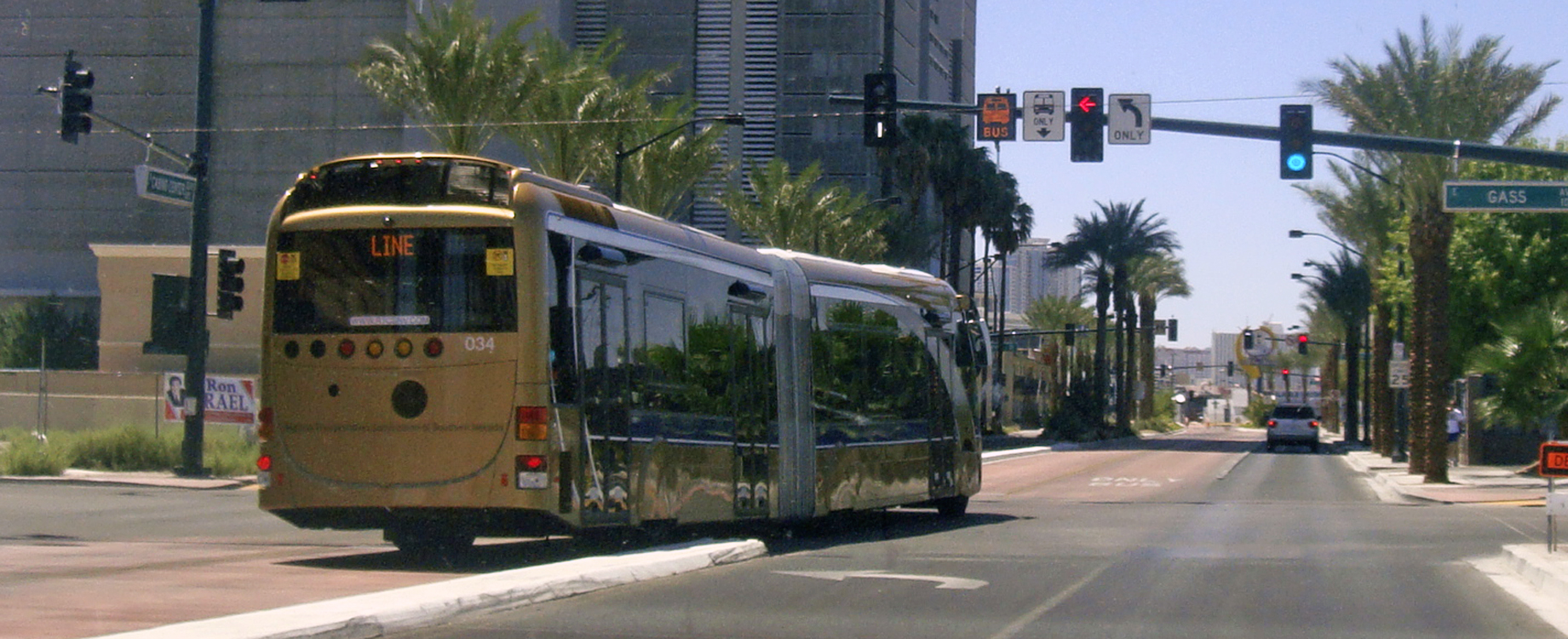
RTC articulated bus operating the BRT line in Las Vegas

After four years of service, MAX moved forward with expansion. In August 2007, the RTC hosted a groundbreaking ceremony for the new ACE BRT system, which was supposed to replace the MAX BRT system, using a new type of vehicles (MAX used Irisbus Civis; ACE would use Wright StreetCar RTV) and new station designs. The first ACE line was named Downtown Connector and would have traveled from the World Market Center, Downtown, the Convention Center, and the Strip, before finally terminating at McCarran International Airport (now Harry Reid International Airport). Construction was completed in mid-2009 with operations starting later that year.

During construction for this route, construction was scheduled to begin on ACE Boulder Highway, which would have traveled from Downtown, down Boulder Highway, and into Downtown Henderson. The RTC was looking at even further expanding, with planned ACE route studies on North 5th Street, Sahara Avenue, Tropicana Avenue, Flamingo Road, and Maryland Parkway.

In March 2008, the pavement was completed on Grand Central Parkway, northbound from Bonneville Avenue to F Street, with the colored cement bus lane in the middle of the road. Construction then proceeded on Grand Central Parkway south of Bonneville Avenue. Also by March 2008, a few of the new ACE buses were already built.

In February 2009, construction was completed on Grand Central Parkway, with the exception of the station themselves. Construction was still ongoing along Casino Center Boulevard and 3rd Street. The route was set to use a dedicated lane from Grand Central Parkway to Imperial Avenue/3rd Street. From that point, it was to operate in mixed flow travel, with special stations built along the route, terminating at the South Strip Transfer Terminal.

== See also ==
- RTC Transit
- Transportation in Las Vegas
