= RTC Transit =

Transit agency in the Las Vegas Metropolitan Area, Nevada

- Parent: Regional Transportation Commission of Southern Nevada
- Founded: November 15, 1992; 33 years ago (as Citizens Area Transit)
- Headquarters: Las Vegas, Nevada
- Locale: Clark County, Nevada
- Service area: Las Vegas Valley, Boulder City
- Service type: Bus, express bus, paratransit
- Routes: 51
- Stops: 3,900+
- Hubs: 6
- Fleet: 408 fixed route
- Daily ridership: 172,800 (weekdays, Q2 2026)
- Annual ridership: 57,888,500 (2025)
- Fuel type: Diesel, fuel cell, and CNG
- Operator: Transdev
- Chief executive: M.J. Maynard
- Website: rtcsnv.com

RTC Transit is a public transit system in the Las Vegas metropolitan area in the US state of Nevada. It is a subsidiary of the Regional Transportation Commission of Southern Nevada. While it services most of Clark County with regularly scheduled routes, most of the service is in the immediate Las Vegas Valley; outlying communities such as Mesquite and Laughlin provide transit services to their residents via the separate Silver Rider Transit system, which uses several vehicles acquired from RTC Transit. In 2025, the system had a ridership of 57,888,500, or about 172,800 per weekday as of the second quarter of 2026.

== History ==
The privately owned Las Vegas Transit System, Inc. ("LVT") provided bus service on the streets of Las Vegas for more than 40 years. LVT service mainly consisted of loop routes that made many turns throughout the city, sometimes doubling back on its own routes and making several "subloops" within a loop. At one point, LVT was named America's worst transit system.

The Regional Transportation Commission of Southern Nevada (RTCSNV or RTC) was formed in 1965 by state legislation to oversee federally-mandated transportation planning in Clark County. Under pressure by the county and state, and by order of the state court, the company was ordered to cease operations except on Route 6-The Strip and relinquish all its city-owned buses to the Regional Transportation Commission of Clark County as of November 15, 1992. LVT and its successors continued to operate service in competition with Citizens Area Transit until about 2005.

=== Citizens Area Transit era (1992–2008) ===
Logo for Citizens Area Transit from 1992 to 2008

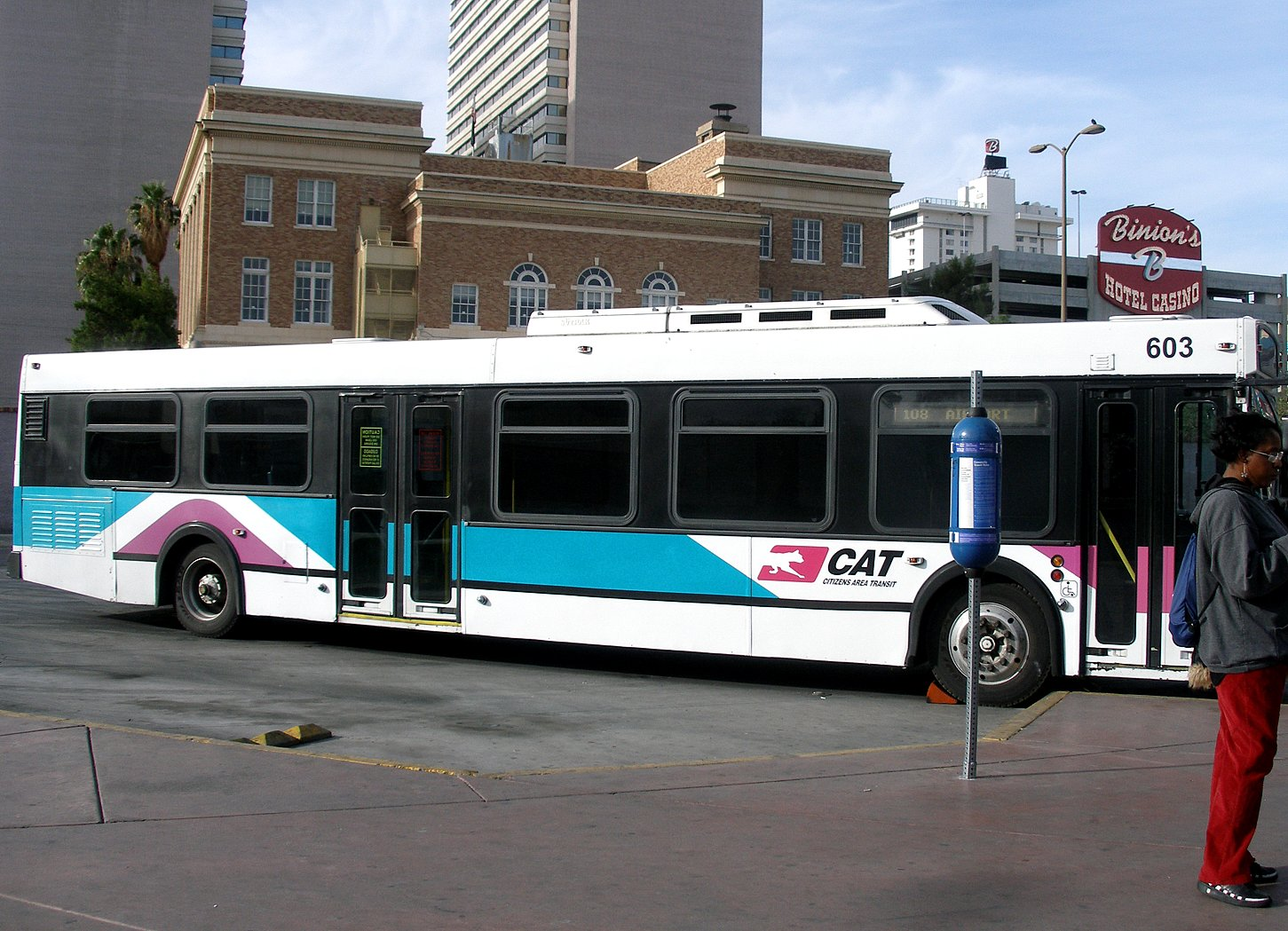
A typical CAT bus with the original teal and magenta livery used from 1992 to 2001

Citizens Area Transit ("CAT") was formed by the RTC to provide reliable bus service to the cities of Las Vegas, North Las Vegas, Henderson, Las Vegas Township, Mesquite, and Laughlin. The system began on November 15, 1992, under the direction of Kurt Weinrich, its general manager. Initially the old LVT routes were operated unchanged except for route 6–The Strip, which LVT still retained. The system was totally reconfigured and Strip service begun December 5, 1992. The fleet consisted of mostly inherited LVT vehicles, later augmented by a large order for new buses. The initial route structure was soon seen as deficient and second complete revision was made in June on 1993. In 1997, the American Public Transportation Association awarded CAT with their highest honor, Best Transit System in America (within its category).

However, things began to change in the following years. In 2002, the Amalgamated Transit Union and the contractor ATC entered contract negotiations but failed to agree on operator wages, leading to CAT's first strike in May. Some drivers walked off the job, forcing service suspensions on several routes. Operators from sister agencies were brought in to maintain limited service until a settlement was reached.

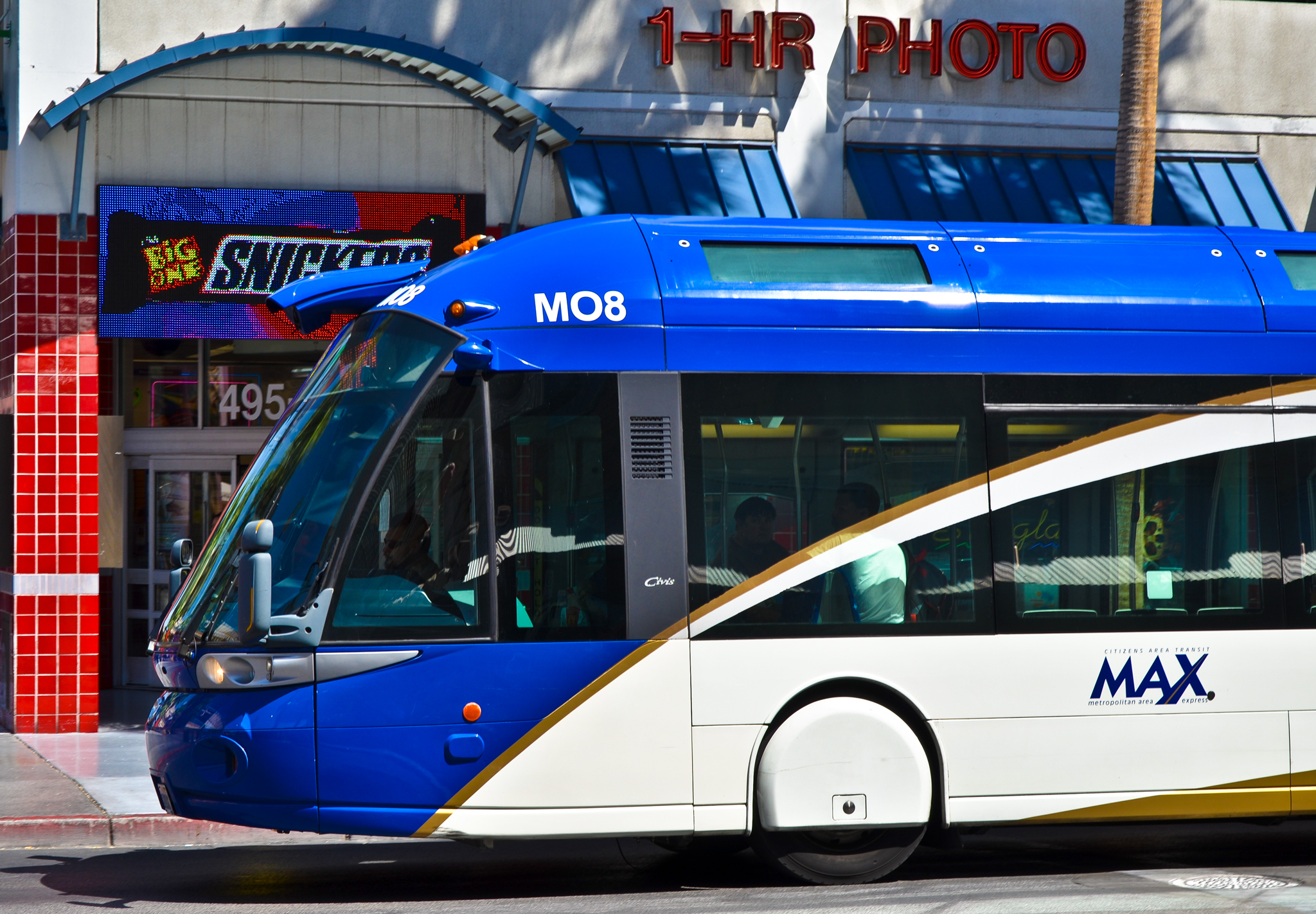
Irisbus Civis near Fremont Street (2012)

In 2004, CAT received its first shipment of Irisbus Civis bus rapid transit (BRT) vehicles. These buses served on the new Metropolitan Area Express (MAX) route, which serves Nellis Air Force Base via North Las Vegas Boulevard. RTC was a member of the BRT Consortium organized by the Federal Transit Administration (FTA) in 1999. North Las Vegas Boulevard had been restriped in spring 2000, which converted what had been a breakdown lane into a dedicated transit lane; RTC subsequently applied for a federal grant in 2002 under the Bus Rapid Transit Initiative. The Civis featured an optical guidance system (OGS) to automate docking at level-boarding platforms, similar to a light-rail system; however, the OGS proved to be unreliable in service due to the difficulty of maintaining pavement markings. Revenue service on MAX started on June 30, 2004; ridership increased by 25% by the end of 2004, and end-to-end travel times were cut approximately in half, from 50 to 25 minutes. A year later, CAT received its first delivery of double decker buses from Alexander Dennis.

RTC planned to build a terminal in Henderson, which was to begin construction in mid-2005. The location was to be near the northeast corner of College Drive and Horizon Drive. According to the RTC, plans included "eight bus berths; covered outdoor waiting; and a small terminal building to include an information/security desk, public restrooms, a driver's lounge, and mechanical spaces." Opposition from residents of the nearby Black Mountain Condominiums caused the project to be canceled following a vote by Henderson City Council on February 15, 2005.

In March 2007, additional double deck vehicles from Alexander Dennis arrived, and the RTC unveiled a new rapid transit system which uses the new Diesel-Hybrid RTV Streetcar from Wright Group. The first line was called the "Gold Line", which serviced the downtown and strip corridors.

=== RTC Transit era (2008–present) ===
Current logo

In late 2007, the RTC began to rebrand the Citizens Area Transit system as RTC Transit. The CAT bus stop signs around the city were replaced by "Transit Stop" signs using the RTC logo. All rider alerts, bus announcements, publications, and recently acquired buses no longer used CAT branding. The re-imaging was completed on January 1, 2009, when RTC vehicles started featuring "RTC TRANSIT" along with the normal route destination headers.

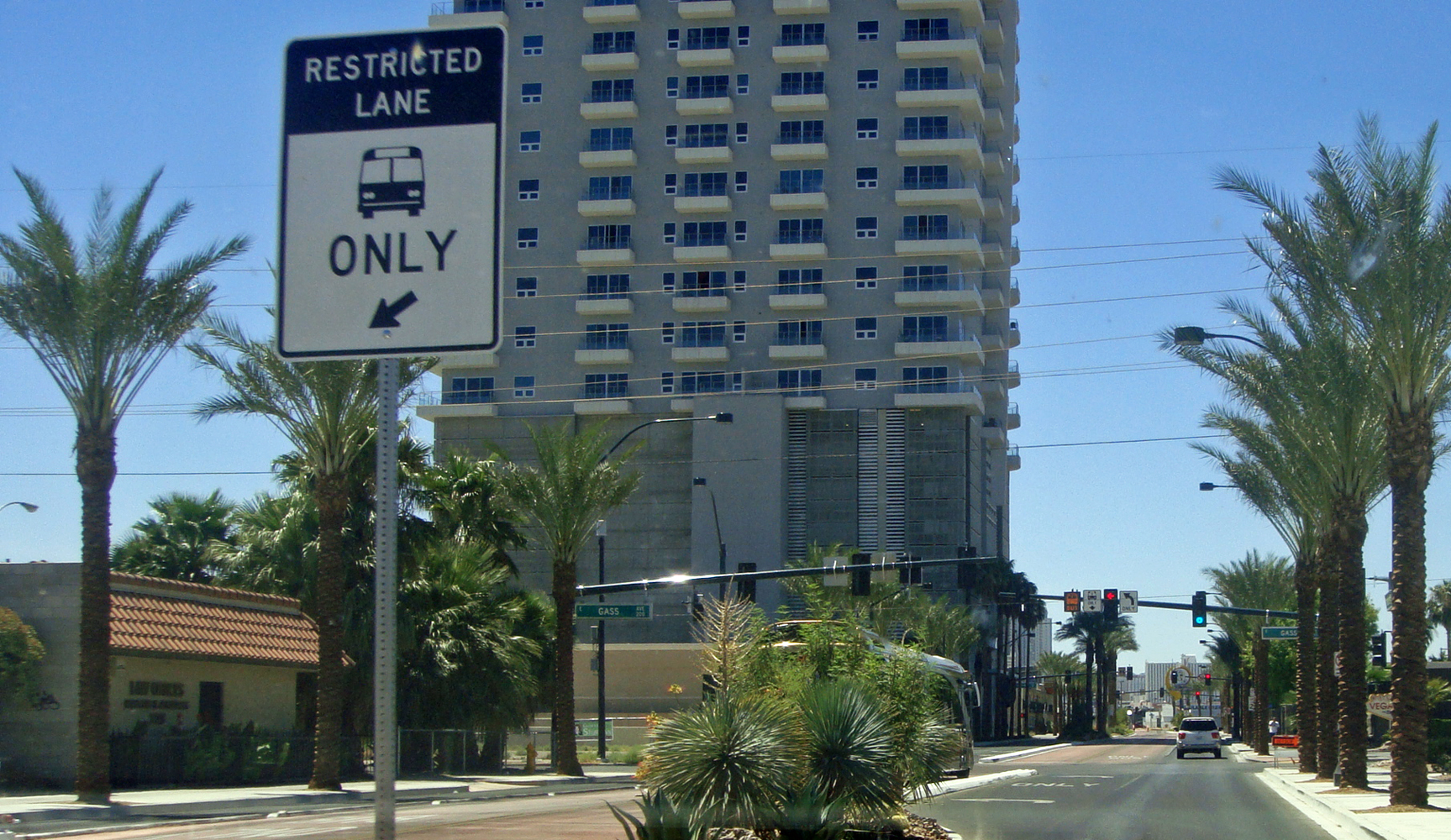
RTC express BRT line in Las Vegas

In January 2010, RTC introduced the ACE branding for its bus rapid transit offerings. The first ACE route was the ACE Gold Line, connecting downtown Las Vegas, the Las Vegas Convention Center, the Strip, and the South Strip Transfer Terminal. In addition, ACExpress was introduced as branding for its express bus service, with an express bus line connecting the Centennial Hills neighborhood northwest of the city with downtown Las Vegas, the Center Strip, and UNLV. In May 2010, RTC rebranded its lines away from the "ACE" name due to a lawsuit from Ace Cab, a local Las Vegas taxi operator; ACE Gold became the Strip and Downtown Express (SDX); ACExpress became Centennial Express (CX), and ACE Green became the Boulder Highway Express (BHX).

The Institute for Transportation and Development Policy (ITDP), under its BRT Standard, has classified the Strip and Downtown Express as a "Basic BRT" corridor. The SDX was suspended due to the COVID-19 pandemic and did not return.

In 2018, RTC began examining the possibility of installing light rail or enhanced bus rapid transit service along high-ridership routes, particularly the Maryland Parkway corridor. Subsequently, the Federal Transit Administration awarded the RTC $150 million to upgrade Route 109 to bus rapid transit with 7.2 miles of bus/bike lanes. The route, stylized as the RED LINE, began service on August 23, 2026. The RED LINE opened with enhanced bus shelters featuring displays with real-time countdowns for bus arrivals and extended service west of Downtown to the Medical District. Most remaining construction is expected to conclude by the end of 2026, with red paint for the bus transit lane to be completed in June 2027.

== Operations ==
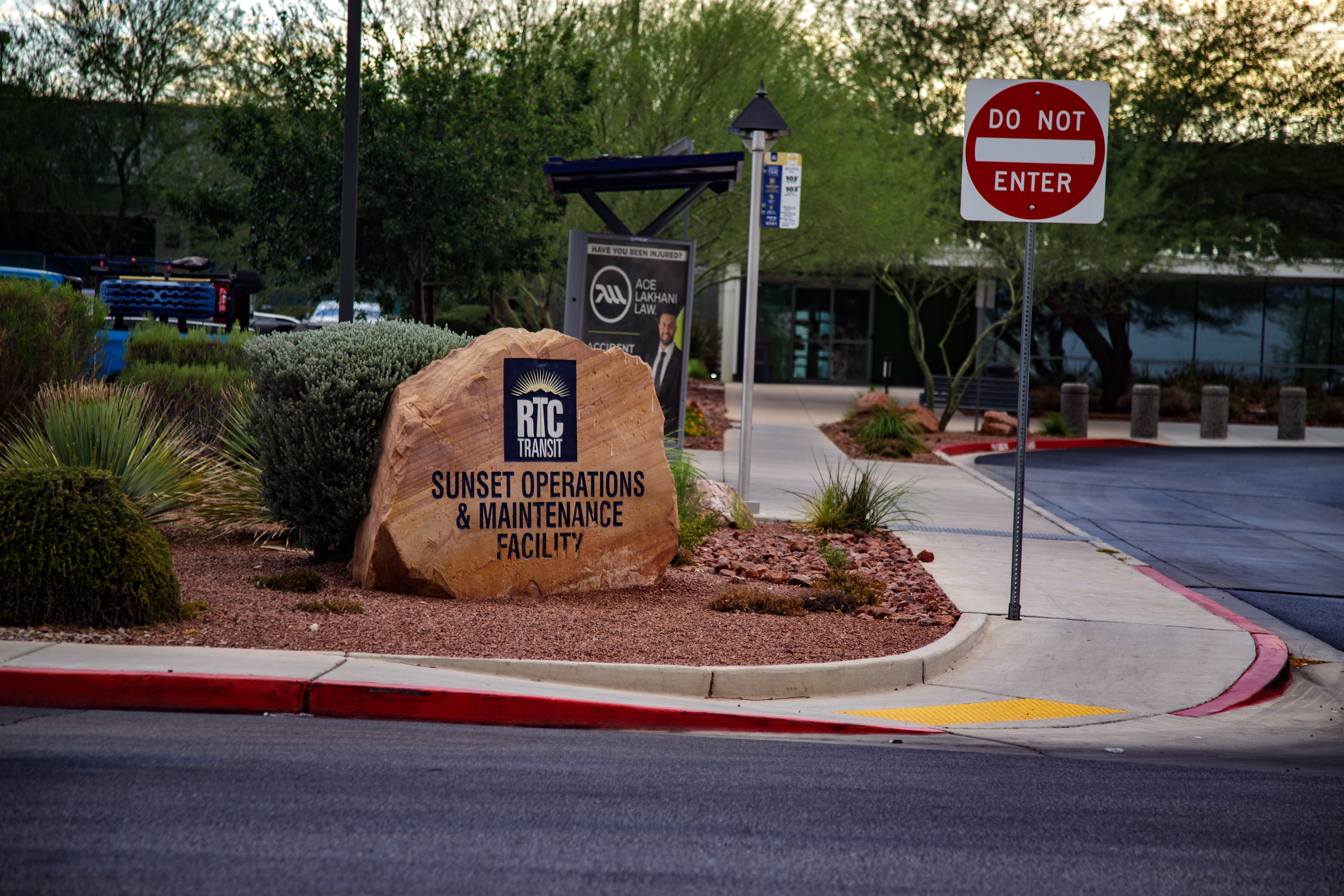
One of the commission's bus maintenance and operations facilities located on West Sunset Road and Hauck Street just west of Decatur Boulevard.

The RTC currently operates 51 routes with 17 routes operating 24 hours a day, seven days a week, including The Deuce on The Strip. Most routes run from early morning until late night/early morning. On weekends & holidays, some routes either operate less frequently, operate with less hours, or not operate at all. Las Vegas has one of the most comprehensive night bus networks in the United States, owing to the 24-hour nature of the casinos and hospitality industry.

RTC Transit is the largest outsourced transit operation in the United States, having overtaken the title from the now-defunct Metropolitan Transportation Authority's Long Island Bus service in late 2011. The fixed route system had been operated by Veolia Transport and its predecessors, ATC-Vancom and National Express, since inception. Bus operators, mechanics, and most other contractor employees are represented by Amalgamated Transit Union Local 1637. Paratransit and dial-a-ride services are operated by Transdev.

The fixed route contract was scheduled to expire September 25, 2011, and was awarded to First Transit, the apparent low bidder and highest scorer on the comprehensive review, however, Veolia has complained to the RTC board of bidding irregularities in the First Transit bid as well as an unfair emphasis on price in comparison to other technical factors.

RTC, once again consolidated the expiring individual fixed-route contracts, held by Keolis and MV Transportation since 2013. The 4-year contract was awarded to First Transit, which was subsequently purchased by Transdev. Transdev took over operations on July 1, 2023.

=== Funding shortfall ===
In May 2026, RTC CEO M.J. Maynard-Carey stated that RTC's transit operations had a funding gap of $118.5 million for fiscal year 2028, and that without an increase in funds, 42% of transit service could be significantly cut in 2028. This funding gap has been attributed to the agency relying disproportionately on revenues from sales tax and fares compared to other transit agencies nationally. The RTC receives a three-eighths of a percent share of sales tax from Clark County.

== Rates ==
Fare payment for the RTC is purchased through vending machines, Tap & GO smart card/app, and contactless credit cards and mobile wallets. All methods are valid across both Residential and Premium Service routes. Services on The Deuce require premium pricing for visitors and tourists. Area residents can use these routes at special local rates by showing eligible identification. It also allows for up to three children aged five and younger to ride free with a fare paying adult. Eligibility for other reduced fares requires passengers to present an RTC issued ID or a valid alternative.

=== U-Pass ===
The agency offers discounted transit fares with participating universities in the Las Vegas Valley through the U-Pass program. U-Pass cards are available for students and employees at UNLV, NSC, and CSN. They provide reduced rates on various passes and are valid on all fixed route services.

== Services ==
RTC Transit operates a grid-type system within the Las Vegas Valley, which includes the four incorporated cities of Las Vegas, North Las Vegas, Henderson, and Boulder City in addition to unincorporated Clark County. The system's two busiest routes, The Deuce on The Strip and RED LINE serving Maryland Parkway provide service to the Las Vegas Strip and Harry Reid International Airport, respectively. Approximately 40% of Clark County residents do not live within close proximity of a bus stop. The agency also operates the Game Day Express, a collection of special routes for occasions such as sporting events at Allegiant Stadium, T-Mobile Arena, and Las Vegas Ballpark.

The RTC service area has the second longest number of full-time bus-only lanes, second only to MTA New York City Transit. Bus-only lanes operate on portions of Flamingo Road, Sahara Avenue, Boulder Highway, North Las Vegas Boulevard, Grand Central Parkway, Casino Center Boulevard and Maryland Parkway.

=== Fixed Routes ===
RTC Routes
Route	Name	Terminals (Note: Where noted, the following transit center abbreviations are used: BTC: Bonneville Transit Center; CHTC: Centennial Hills Transit Center; SSTT: South Strip Transit Terminal; WTC: Westcliff Transit Center)		Via(s)	Notes
100s: Local (Residential) Routes: North–South
101	Rainbow	Lone Mtn & Rancho	Rainbow & Blue Diamond	Rainbow	
102	Jones	Craig & Rancho	Jones & Robindale	Jones	
103	Decatur	Grand Teton & Decatur	Decatur & Blue Diamond	Decatur	Split as 103A/B, limited 24-hr service
103	Decatur	Decatur & Elkhorn	Decatur & Blue Diamond	Decatur	Split as 103A/B, limited 24-hr service
104	Valley View	Tenaya & Mtn View Hospital	SSTT	Torrey Pines, Washington, Valley View, Russell, and Las Vegas Blvd	
105	Martin L. King	N. 5th & Rome	BTC	Tropical, Camino Eldorado, Camino Al Norte, Martin Luther King	24-hr service
106	Rancho / Centennial Hills	CHTC	BTC	Rancho, Bonanza, and Main	Split as 106A/B
108	Paradise	Reid Airport	BTC	University Center	
110	Eastern	Cheyenne & Civic Ctr	Eastern & Horizon Ridge	Eastern	24-hr service
111	Green Valley / Pecos	Pecos & Craig	Green Valley Ranch Resort	Pecos	Split as 111A/B
113	Las Vegas Blvd N	Las Vegas Blvd & Craig	Green Valley Ranch Resort	BTC	
115	Nellis / Stephanie	Craig & N Las Vegas Blvd	Stephanie & Horizon Ridge	Nellis and Stephanie	Limited 24-hr service
117	Las Vegas Blvd. S. / Silverado Ranch	SSTT	Eastern & Serene	Las Vegas Blvd & Silverado Ranch	
119	Simmons / Koval	Elkhorn & Aliante Pkwy	Reno & Las Vegas Blvd	Simmons, Rancho Tonopah, Sammy Davis Jr, and Koval	
120	Fort Apache / Rampart	Durango/Rampart & Cheyenne	Durango & Blue Diamond	Rampart and Fort Apache	
121	Durango / Buffalo	Buffalo & Cheyenne	Durango & Blue Diamond	Buffalo and Durango	
122	S. Maryland Pkwy / W. Henderson	SSTT	Durango & Blue Diamond	Las Vegas Blvd & Volunteer	Paradise, Maryland Parkway, and St. Rose
Route	Name	Terminals		Via(s)	Notes
200s: Local (Residential) Routes: East–West
201	Tropicana	Tropicana & Fort Apache	Andover & Boulder Hwy	Tropicana	Split as 201A/B, 24-hr service (201A)
202	Flamingo	Grand Canyon & Rochelle	Andover & Boulder Hwy	Flamingo	24-hr service
203	Spring Mountain / Desert Inn / Lamb	Town Center & Twain	Lamb & Craig	Desert Inn, Spring Mountain, and Lamb	
206	Charleston	Pavilion Ctr & Summerlin Ctr	Charleston & Sloan	Charleston and BTC	24-hr service
207	Alta / Stewart	Alta & Rampart	Stewart & Nellis	Alta and Meadows	
208	Washington	WTC	Bonanza & Nellis	Washington and BTC	
209	Vegas / Owens	Alta & Rampart	Owens & Nellis	Vegas Drive, Owens Avenue	Weekend trips only serve Alta & Rampart
209	Vegas / Owens	Buffalo & Washington	Owens & Nellis	Vegas Drive, Owens Avenue	Weekend trips only serve Alta & Rampart
210	Lake Mead Blvd.	Town Center & Covington	Lake Mead & Radwich	Town Center and Lake Mead Blvd	24-hr service
212	Sunset	Fort Apache & Sunset	Lake Mead & Center	Sunset, Warm Springs, and SSTT	
214	H Street / D Street	BTC		Main, D / H Streets	
215	Bonanza	BTC	Nellis & Bonanza	Bonanza	
217	Warm Springs / Lake Mead Pkwy.	Dean Martin / Silverton	Burkholder & Pueblo	Warm Springs, Lake Mead Pkwy, and SSTT	
218	Cheyenne	Cheyenne & Hualapai	Cheyenne & Nellis	Cheyenne	
219	Craig	Lone Mtn & Rancho	Craig & Las Vegas Blvd	Craig	
220	Ann / Tropical	Skye Canyon Park & Grand Canyon	Centennial & Hollywood	Deer Springs, Ann, and Tropical	
221	Cactus / Horizon Ridge / Boulder City	Durango & Blue Diamond	Utah & Northridge	Blue Diamond, Cactus, Carnegie, Horizon Ridge, and Boulder City	
Route	Name	Terminals		Via(s)	Notes
300s: The Strip Corridor Routes
Deuce	Deuce on The Strip	Fremont Street Experience	SSTT	Las Vegas Blvd and BTC	24-hr service
Route	Name	Terminals		Via(s)	Notes
400s: Shuttle Routes
401	N. Outlets / Symphony Park	BTC		Grand Central and Main	Circulator route
Route	Name	Terminals		Via(s)	Notes
600s: Game Day Express Routes
605	Summerlin Game Day Express	Red Rock Casino, Resort & Spa	Allegiant Stadium / T-Mobile Arena	Direct express routing	Operates for select sporting events and Raiders/Golden Knights home games. Each route begins service approximately 3 hours before kickoff with return service from stadiums up to 40 minutes after the game ends.
606	Green Valley Game Day Express	Green Valley Ranch Resort Spa & Casino	Allegiant Stadium / T-Mobile Arena	Direct express routing	Operates for select sporting events and Raiders/Golden Knights home games. Each route begins service approximately 3 hours before kickoff with return service from stadiums up to 40 minutes after the game ends.
607	Centennial Hills Game Day Express	Santa Fe Station	Allegiant Stadium / T-Mobile Arena	Direct express routing	Operates for select sporting events and Raiders/Golden Knights home games. Each route begins service approximately 3 hours before kickoff with return service from stadiums up to 40 minutes after the game ends.
609	East Side Game Day Express	Sam's Town Hotel & Gambling Hall	Allegiant Stadium / T-Mobile Arena	Direct express routing	Operates for select sporting events and Raiders/Golden Knights home games. Each route begins service approximately 3 hours before kickoff with return service from stadiums up to 40 minutes after the game ends.
610	North Las Vegas Game Day Express	Aliante Casino and Hotel	Allegiant Stadium / T-Mobile Arena	Direct express routing	Operates for select sporting events and Raiders/Golden Knights home games. Each route begins service approximately 3 hours before kickoff with return service from stadiums up to 40 minutes after the game ends.
612	West Henderson Game Day Express	M Resort Spa Casino	Allegiant Stadium / T-Mobile Arena	Direct express routing	Operates for select sporting events and Raiders/Golden Knights home games. Each route begins service approximately 3 hours before kickoff with return service from stadiums up to 40 minutes after the game ends.
613	UNLV Football Game Day Express	UNLV Transit Center	Allegiant Stadium	Direct express routing	Operates only during UNLV home football games
Route	Name	Terminals		Via(s)	Notes
Express Routes
BHX	Boulder Highway Express	BTC	CSN Henderson	Fremont Street (Boulder Highway)	Split as BHX-A/B, limited 24-hr service (BHX-A)
BHX	Boulder Highway Express	BTC	Nevada State University	Fremont Street (Boulder Highway)	Split as BHX-A/B, limited 24-hr service (BHX-A)
CX	Centennial Express	Skye Canyon Park & Grand Canyon	SSTT	CHTC, I-11, Rainbow Blvd, BTC, I-15	Service to UNLV Transit Center discontinued as of Aug 2026 service change
CX	Centennial Express	BTC	SSTT	CHTC, I-11, Rainbow Blvd, BTC, I-15	Service to UNLV Transit Center discontinued as of Aug 2026 service change
DVX	Downtown & Veterans Medical Center Express	BTC	VA Southern Nevada Healthcare System	I-15, Losee Road	
RED LINE	Maryland Pkwy BRT	Wellness Way (University Medical District)	SSTT	BTC, Maryland Pkwy, Harry Reid International Airport	24-hr service, bus rapid transit
SX	Sahara Express	Pavilion Ctr & Summerlin Ctr	Nellis & Desert Inn	Sahara Avenue	Split as SX-A/B, 24-hr service via SX-B
SX	Sahara Express	Pavilion Ctr & Summerlin Ctr	Vegas Valley & Hollywood	Sahara Avenue	Split as SX-A/B, 24-hr service via SX-B

=== RTC Paratransit ===
Even though all buses in the system have wheelchair lifts, RTC operates RTC Paratransit for people who have difficulty in accessing the regular transit system. By-appointment-only paratransit is a door-to-door service. RTC also maintains an open charge account with a local taxicab company to service paratransit ridership when unforeseen delays occur, frequently caused by traffic congestion.

== Transfer facilities ==
RTC Transit transfer facilities
1 South Strip Transfer Terminal
2 Downtown Summerlin Transit Facility
3 Bonneville Transit Center
4 Centennial Hills Transit Center Park & Ride
5 Westcliff Transit Center
6 UNLV Transit Center
7 Downtown Transportation Center (closed 2010)

=== South Strip Transfer Terminal ===
The South Strip Transfer Terminal (or "SSTT") was opened in 2003 after the Vacation Village hotel and casino was closed, which was the southern terminus for many CAT routes. The SSTT is serviced by seven RTC routes and the Amtrak Thruway#10.

=== Bonneville Transit Center ===
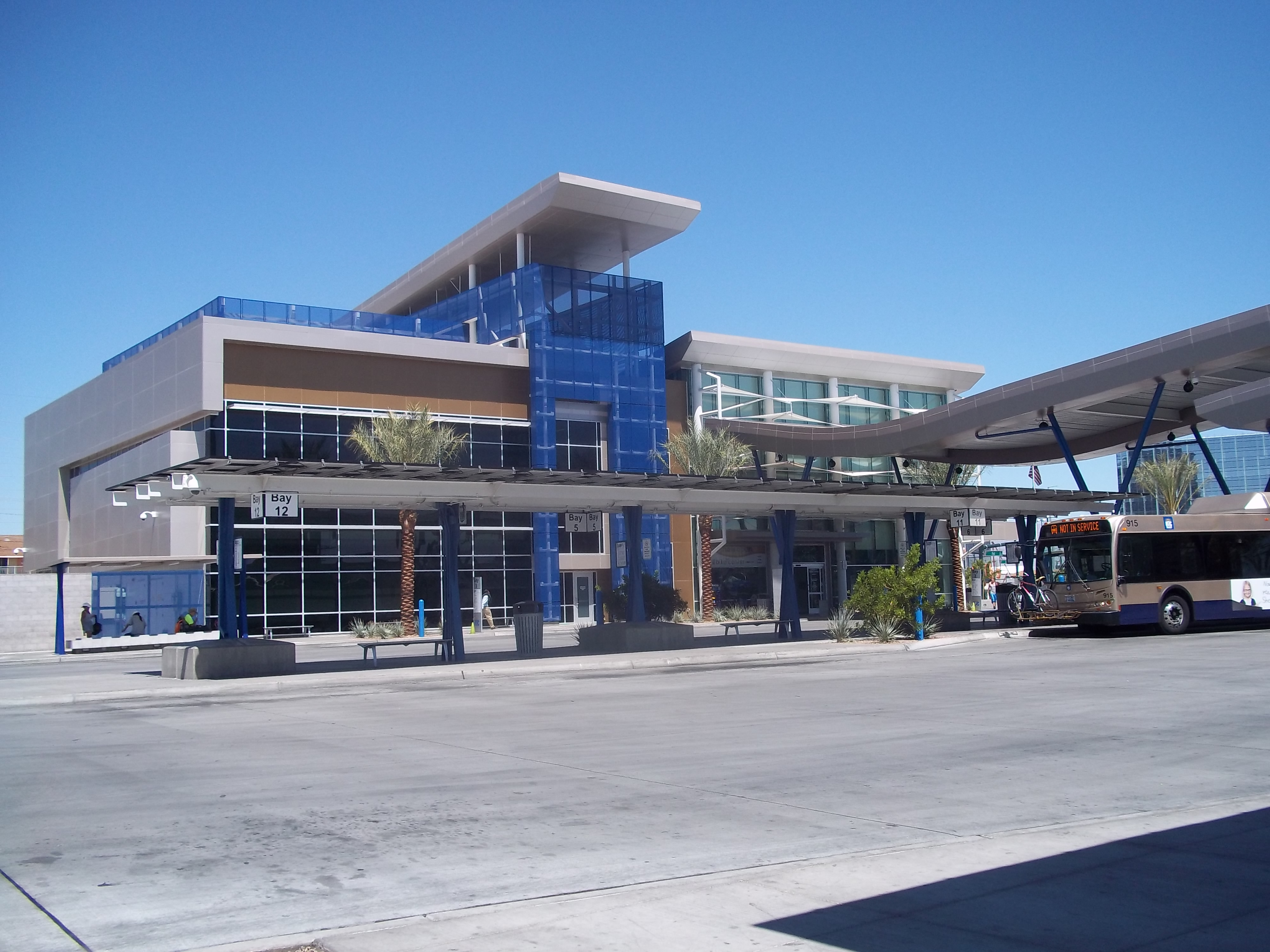
Bonneville Transit Center (2011)

The Bonneville Transit Center (BTC) is a transit point hub which replaced the Downtown Transportation Center as the main downtown fixed route terminal, which opened in November 2010. It is served by various express routes, The Deuce, and the Las Vegas Downtown Loop (DTL). In addition to local services it has a FlixBus stop and Amtrak Thruway buses connecting to the Gold Runner.

=== Centennial Hills Transit Center Park & Ride ===
The Centennial Hills Transit Center is a transit terminal operated by the RTC to serve the northwest valley and its residents. It includes 900 parking spaces, park & ride, indoor waiting facility, next arrival information and restrooms. Construction began in July 2009, and it opened in conjunction with the launch of the then named ACExpress C-Line, now Centennial Express (CX) on March 28, 2010.

=== Westcliff Transit Center ===
The Westcliff Transit Center is a transit terminal built in the valley's west side community of Summerlin and officially opened on December 12, 2010, It opened with the launch of the Westcliff Airport Express (WAX) connecting to McCarran Airport, downtown Las Vegas, and the valley's west side.

=== UNLV Transit Center ===
The UNLV Transit Center is a transit terminal built on the University of Nevada, Las Vegas campus in Central Las Vegas. It is located on the UNLV main campus and officially opened on September 4, 2013. Event services to UNLV football games and the Centennial Express (CX) began service to the center a day later.

As part of RED LINE-related service changes starting August 23, 2026, Centennial Express service ended to the UNLV Transit Center, leaving it with no transit service except the seasonal Game Day Express.

=== Downtown Summerlin Transit Facility ===
The Downtown Summerlin Transit Facility serving Downtown Summerlin, as well as local sports venues, opened in September 2017. It serves the Sahara Express (SX) and Route 206.

=== Former Downtown Transportation Center ===
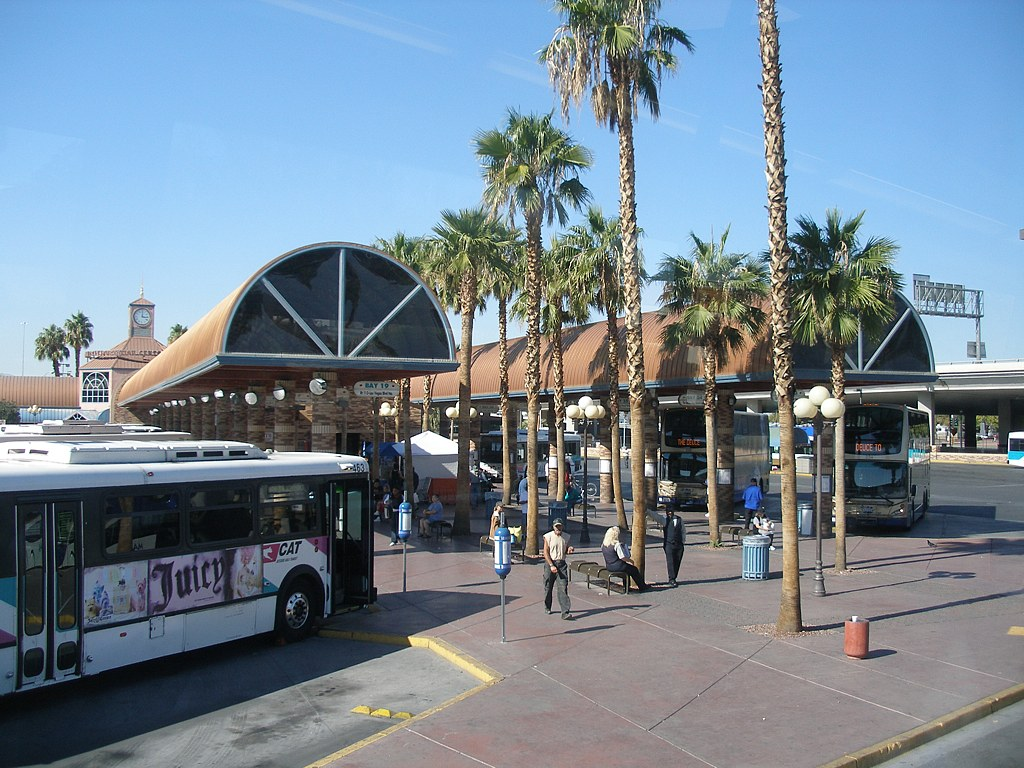
The original Downtown Transportation Center

The Downtown Transportation Center (or "DTC") was the main transit center for the RTC systems in downtown Las Vegas. The DTC was opened in the late 1980s to serve as the main terminal for the Las Vegas City Trolley, and for the private Las Vegas Transit System, Inc. In 1992, it became the terminal for Citizens Area Transit, once Las Vegas Transit ceased operations. The DTC remained under ownership of the City of Las Vegas until July 31, 2009, when the city transferred control of the terminal to the RTC. The RTC closed the aging terminal on November 7, 2010, with the opening of the Bonneville Transit Center.

== Accidents and incidents ==
On the afternoon of January 18, 2013, a woman, driving a 2004 Ford Taurus, crashed into a double-decker bus at Charleston and Rainbow, killing herself and injuring 5 people who were on the bus. The people of the bus only suffered minor injuries.

On the morning of July 31, 2026, a car collided with an articulated bus near the intersection of 13th and Fremont Street. A total of 14 individuals were sent to local hospitals with non-life-threatening injuries.

== Equipment ==
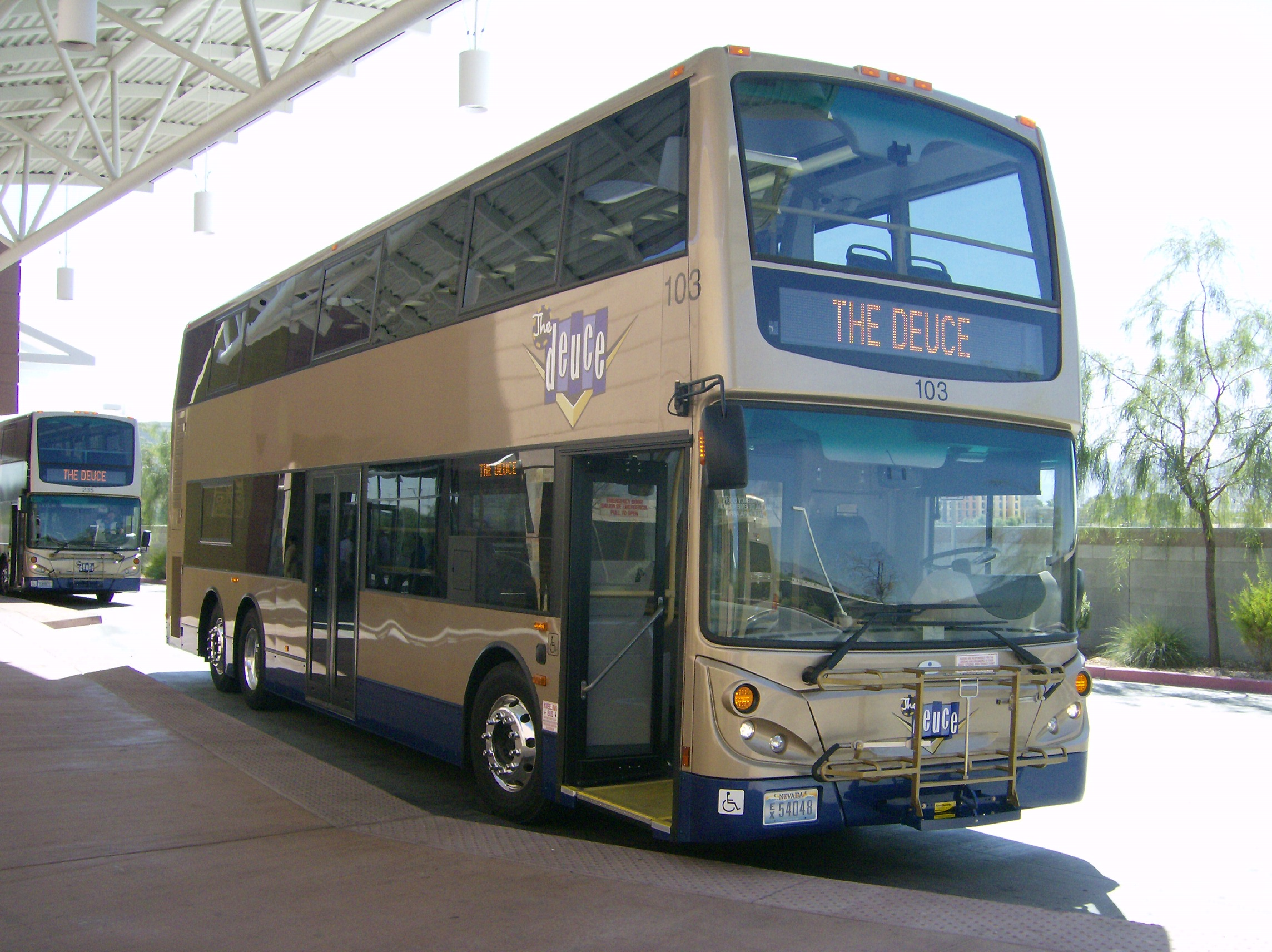
A 2007 Deuce bus at the South Strip Transfer Terminal.

In 2005, the agency added a fleet of double-decker buses for services on The Strip, named The Deuce. RTC currently operates mainly New Flyer, Alexander Dennis buses for fixed routes, and mainly Ford Econoline vans for paratransit.

=== Active Fleet ===
Delivered	Model	Image	Notes
2015–2024	New Flyer; XN60 Xcelsior; Articulated		
2015–2026	New Flyer; XN40 Xcelsior		
2020–2026	Alexander Dennis; Enviro 500 "Go-Anywhere"	2020 RTCSNV Alexander Dennis Enviro 500 20803	Currently arriving on property.; Some have new grey and black paint scheme.
2022	New Flyer; XHE40 Xcelsior CHARGE H2		Uses Hydrogen fuel cells
2023–2024	New Flyer; XE40 Xcelsior CHARGE		
2024	New Flyer; XHE60 Xcelsior CHARGE H2; Articulated		

=== Retired Fleet ===
Delivered	Model	Image	Notes
1981–1984	GMC RTS T8J204		
1981–1982	Grumman Flxible 870		
1990	Gillig Phantom		
1991–1996	New Flyer D60HF		
1992	TMC RTS		
1992	New Flyer D40HF		
1994–1998	New Flyer D40LF		
1997–1998	NABI 436.08VA		
1997	ElDorado National; Transmark RE		Retired due to small capacity in 2007.
2001	New Flyer C40LF		
2001	NABI 40-LFW (1st Gen)		
2002	Neoplan AN460L		Entire fleet retired due to cracked suspension frame in 2013.
2003	Irisbus Civis		The only Irisbus Civis coaches that operated in the United States.
2004	New Flyer D60LF		
2005–2007	Alexander Dennis Enviro500		
2006	New Flyer DE41LFR		First hybrid buses for fixed route service in Las Vegas.
2007–2008	NABI 40-LFW Hybrid (2nd Gen)		
2008	New Flyer C40LFR		
2008–2009	Wright StreetCar RTV		These were the only Streetcar coaches in the United States.
2013–2014	New Flyer XN60	New Flyer XN60	The first Xcelsior units in the fleet.
