= Wright StreetCar =

Low-floor articulated tram-like bus

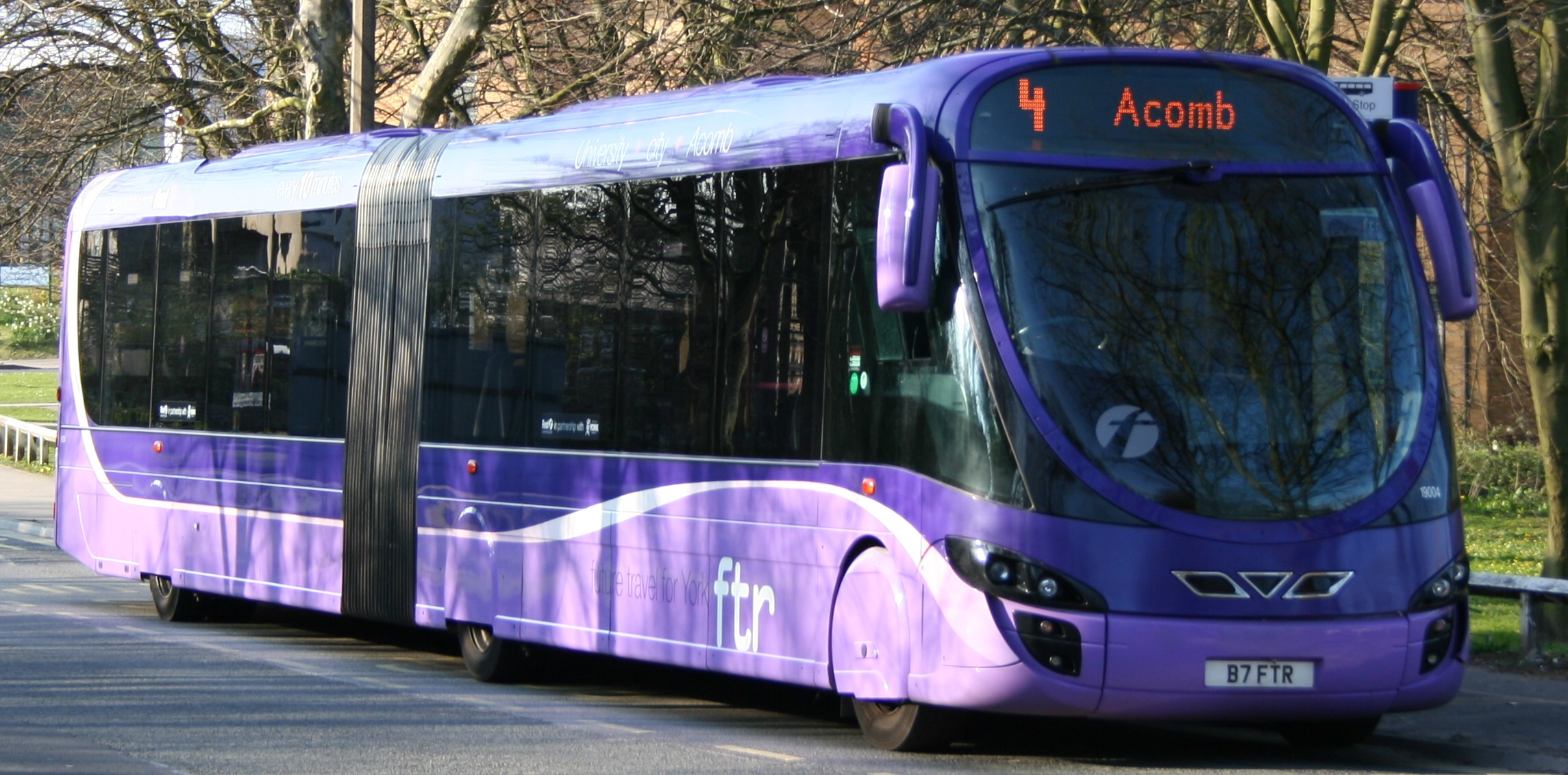
- First York Wright StreetCar in York in April 2007

Overview
- Manufacturer: Wrightbus
- Production: 2006–2009
- Assembly: Ballymena, Northern Ireland

Body and chassis
- Doors: 2 or 3
- Floor type: Low floor
- Chassis: Volvo B7LA; Volvo B9LA; Carrosserie Hess

Powertrain
- Engine: Volvo D7275 (Volvo B7LA/B9LA); Cummins ISL 330 (Carrosserie Hess)
- Capacity: 76 standing, 43 seated
- Transmission: ZF Friedrichshafen (Volvo B7LA); Allison Transmission (Carrosserie Hess)

Dimensions
- Wheelbase: 6,410 mm (252 1/2 in) (F); 7,110 mm (280 in) (R)
- Length: 18,620 mm (61 ft 1 in)
- Width: 2,530 mm (99.5 in)
- Height: 3,400 mm (134 in)
- Curb weight: 22,000 kg (48,600 lb)

Chronology
- Predecessor: Wright Eclipse Fusion

The Wright StreetCar is an articulated bus developed by Wrightbus and Volvo on the Volvo B7LA chassis. The body was also produced on Carrosserie Hess for export to the United States.

== Design ==
The StreetCar was designed for use on the FirstGroup's FTR premium services, featuring high frequencies and dedicated stops. The body was designed with heavily curved elements to mimic the appearance of a tram, uniquely featuring non-rotating hubcaps on the front axle and fender skirts over the rear wheels. The StreetCar uniquely featured a separate driver compartment at the front, with a single-piece curved windscreen fitted alongside two curved side windows; as tickets could not be issued by the driver, on the FTR system, passengers of the StreetCar were encouraged to either buy tickets from "pay points" or buy mobile phone tickets before they boarded, however an exact change ticket machine was also available on board. Live satellite tracking of FTR StreetCars was also available as standard.

Internally, the StreetCars featured air conditioning and infotainment systems, and carried a maximum of 113 passengers, 76 of these standing and the remaining 37 seated; as well as being built with conventional forward-facing seats, StreetCars had wrap-around seating in the rear section to create "lounge areas".

== Operators ==
=== United Kingdom ===
The StreetCar's only UK customer was the FirstGroup's bus operations, who first launched the ftr network using StreetCars on First York's route 4 between Acomb and the University of York on 8 May 2006, after the City of York Council had made significant alterations to the road layout to accommodate the new vehicles. Further examples entered service with First Leeds, on First Capital Connect's Luton Airport Parkway railway station to Luton Airport shuttle and with First Cymru in Swansea.

York's StreetCars were withdrawn in 2012, following the end of a five-year contract which the City of York Council refused to renew. These StreetCars were transferred over to Leeds to operate on the Leeds-Bradford bus corridor, but StreetCars there were later withdrawn in 2016. Swansea's StreetCars, which caused major road layout changes around the city centre to fit the buses that were later blamed for causing two fatal accidents, were withdrawn in 2015 due to them proving too expensive to run.

A pre-delivery ftr StreetCar was trialled by Go North East for two weeks in 2006 on the X66 express MetroCentre CentreLink shuttle serving Gateshead, with conductors issuing tickets for the service on both termini of the route, however no orders resulted.

=== United States ===
In 2008/09, 50 StreetCar Rapid Transit Vehicles were built for Regional Transportation Commission of Southern Nevada in the United States for use on the RTC Transit. Developed from the Wright StreetCar, they were built on Carrosserie Hess chassis, and first arrived in the United States in October 2008.

== Gallery ==
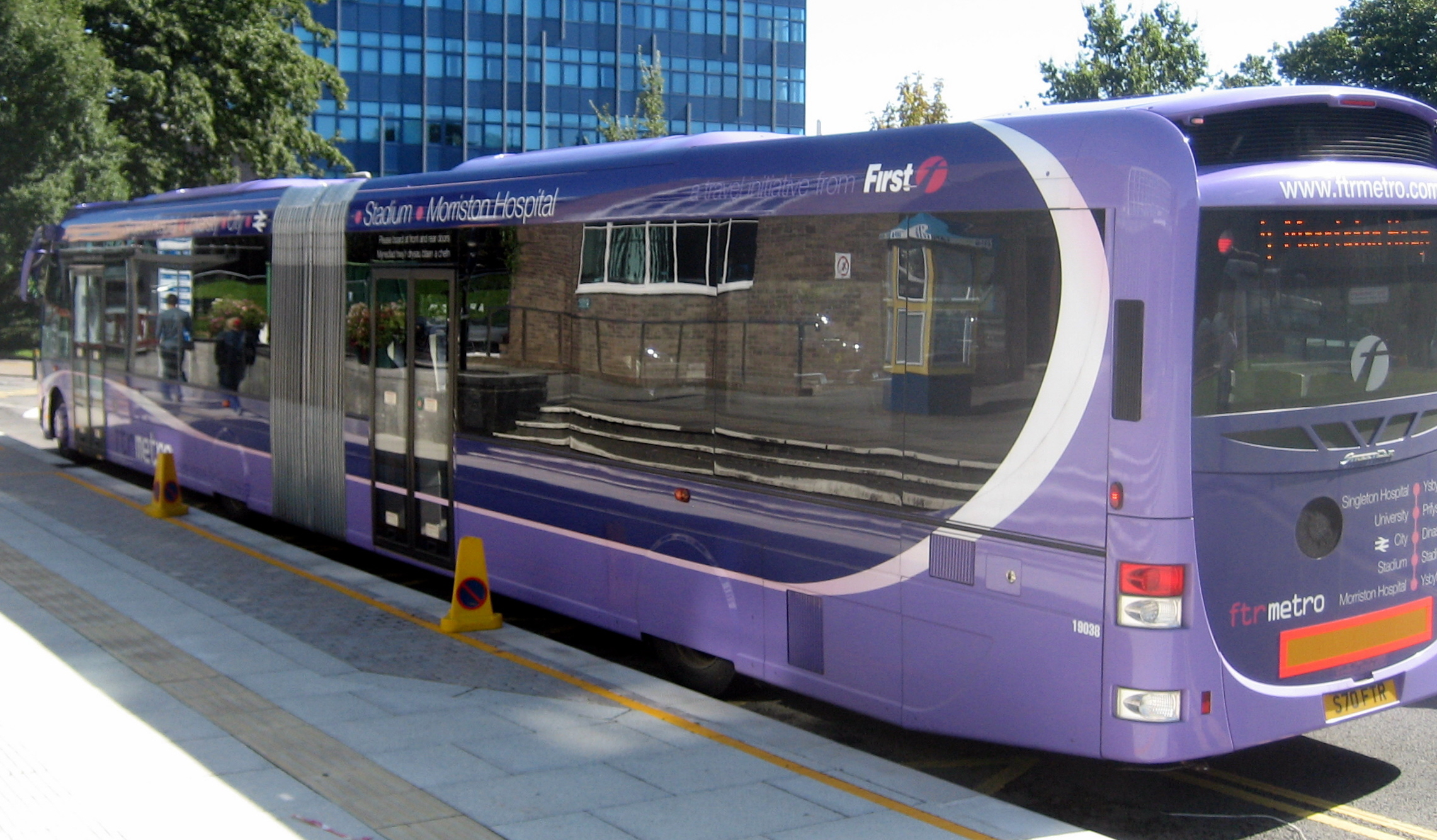
Rear of a Wright StreetCar in Swansea

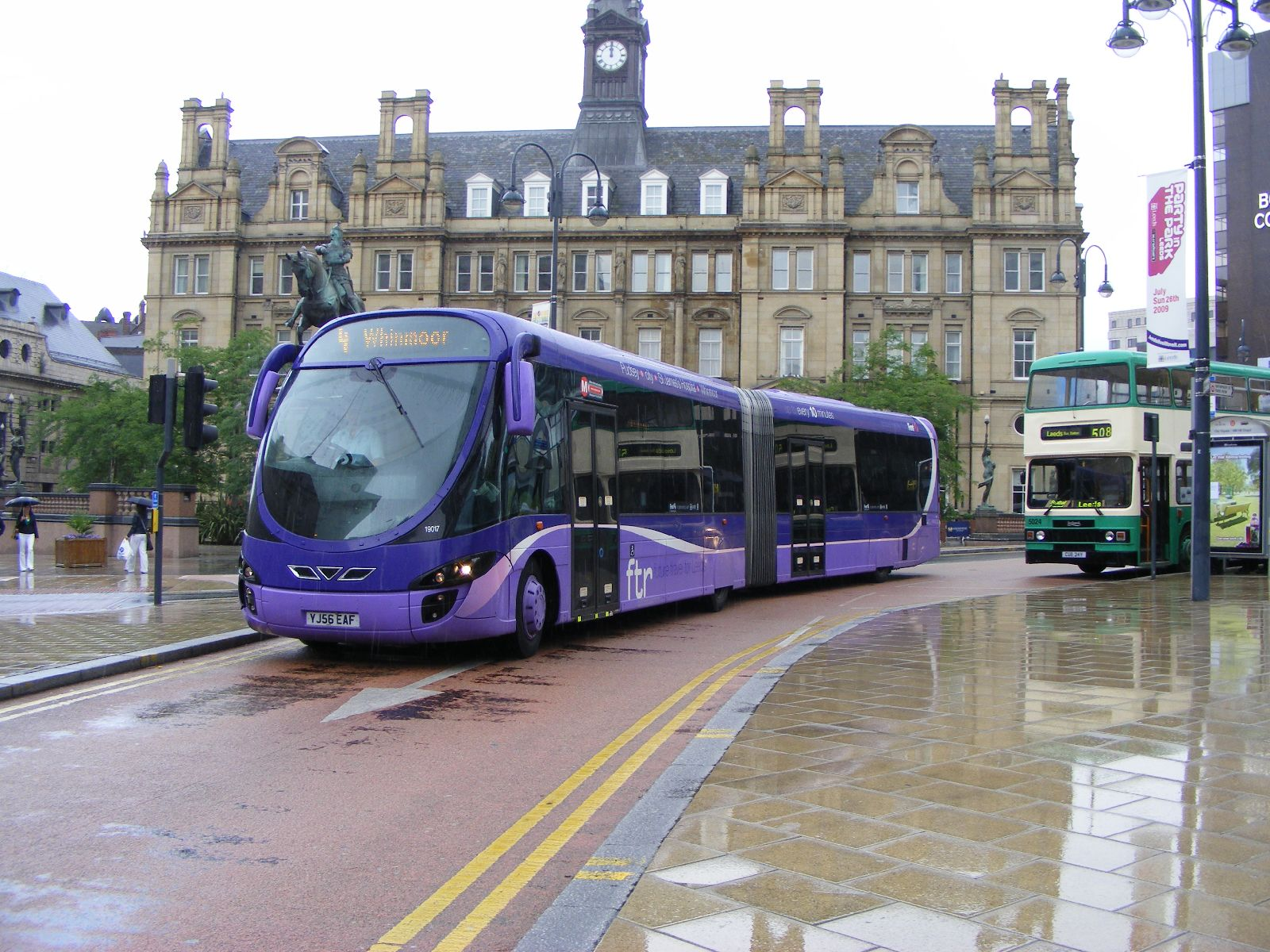
A Wright StreetCar in use on First West Yorkshire's ftr service in Leeds city centre

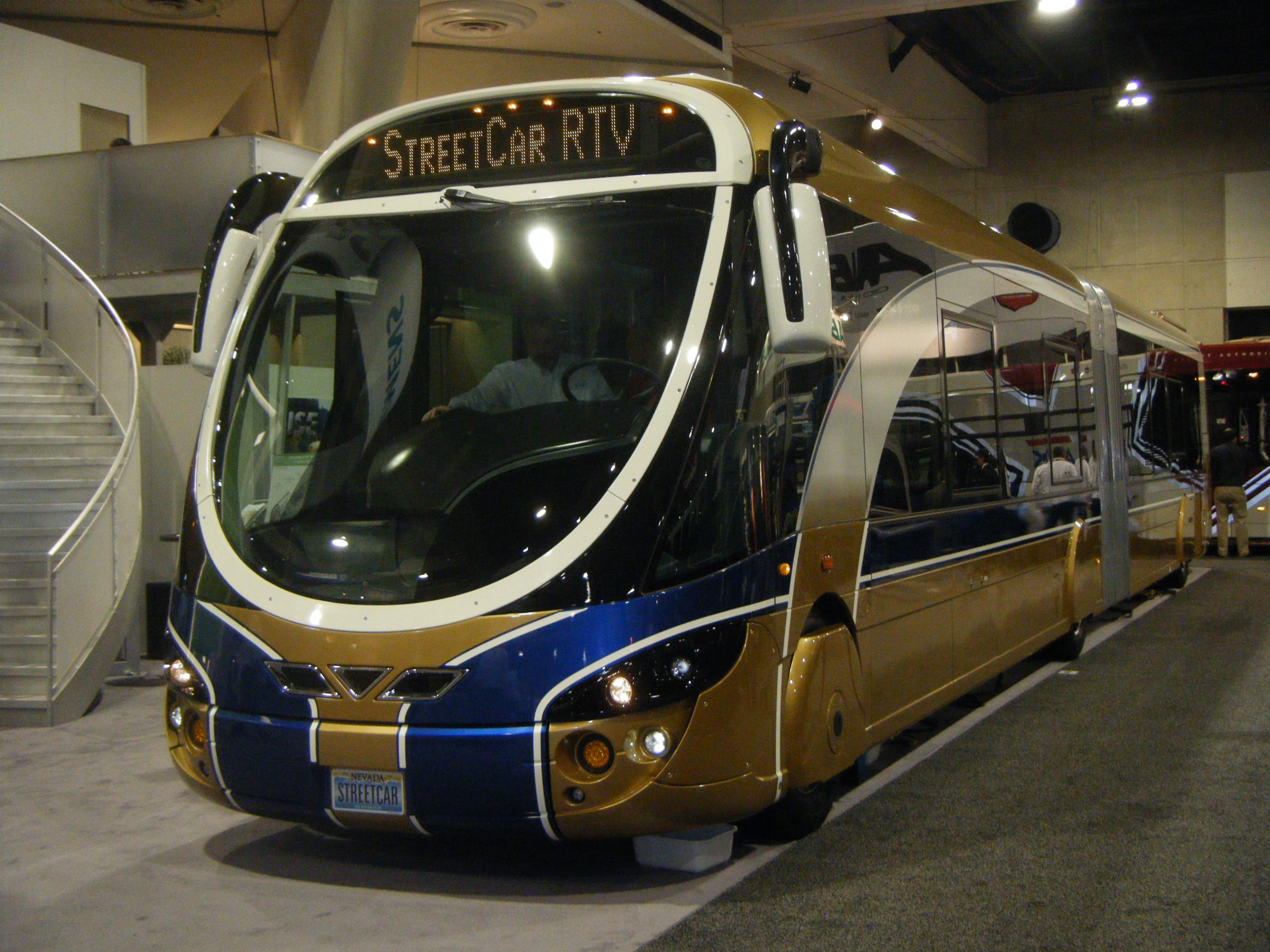
RTC Transit Wright StreetCar RTV bodied Carrosserie Hess on display in Las Vegas

== See also ==
- Autonomous Rail Rapid Transit
