= Las Vegas Transit =

Defunct transit agency in Clark County, Nevada

Las Vegas Transit System
- Parent: Las Vegas Transit System Inc.
- Founded: 1942 (as Vegas Transit Company)
- Defunct: 1992 (local routes); 1993 (The Strip route)
- Locale: Las Vegas, Nevada
- Service area: Las Vegas Valley
- Service type: Bus service
- Routes: 16 (1992)
- Hubs: Downtown Transportation Center
- Fleet: 45 (at dissolution)
- Operator: Las Vegas Transit System Inc.

Las Vegas Transit or LVT, also known as Las Vegas Transit System (LVTS), was a private corporation that managed the public transit bus network in the Las Vegas Metropolitan Area.

== History ==
=== Overview ===
The Vegas Transit Company (VTC) started public transportation operations in Las Vegas on August 20, 1942, with three routes and six buses by 1943. The Tanner family (as Tanner Motor Tours of Nevada) acquired VTC, then sold the franchise in 1965 to Henry Burroughs, who rebranded it as the Las Vegas Transit System (LVTS). Both LVTS and Gray Line Tours of Southern Nevada (GLT) were owned by First Gray Line West of Los Angeles, California. LVTS and GLT operated out of the same yard, on Industrial Rd near Charleston Blvd. Due to its lucrative Strip route, LVTS made significant profits for its owners.

LVTS operated between 1965 and approximately 1993. They were bought out by the Regional Transportation Commission of Southern Nevada (RTCSNV) in early 1993 for $900,000. RTCSNV inaugurated its Citizens Area Transit service in December 1992, and for a time, there were technically two public transit systems in Las Vegas until LVTS faded away. After CAT took over, LVTS only competed with CAT on the busy and lucrative Route #6 "Strip" for several months before being bought out. The CAT system is now known as RTC Transit.

=== 1960s–1970s ===
LVTS ran a frequent service for multiple years during the 1960s and 1970s when the city was small; their routes covered most of the city. At the time, they were considered a vast improvement over its predecessor, Vegas Transit Lines. In 1972, approximately 8,000 passenger trips were operated per weekday. In an article written in Bus World Magazine in 1978, they were praised as a self-sufficient bus system. However, LVTS suspended service to West Las Vegas, a predominantly minority neighborhood, in 1969 after a series of violent incidents; the NAACP sued LVTS in 1974 stating the service was racially discriminatory. At the time, government officials also began exploring the idea of starting a public transit system to take advantage of federal subsidies.

Routes in 1978 (Note: All routes originate from downtown.) (Note: Not all routes are synchronized for same-time departure.) (Note: 26 buses in fleet.)
No.	Name	Headway (min)	Runs/ day	Buses required
1	Hyde Park	60	14	1
3 (Note: Offered 24-hour service) (Note: Bidirectional service)	Salt Lake Hwy	30	27	4
4	Boulder Hwy	30	27	4
5	Huntridge	60	14	1
6	Strip	15	78	6-10
7	College Park	45	20	1
8	Golfridge	60	14	1
9	Vegas Heights	30	20	2
10	University	60	13	1
Notes

In September 1974, LVTS experimented with a "grid" route system to expand coverage, replacing the former "hub and spoke" system at the insistence of the Regional Transit Commission. The new system expanded coverage to 75,000 additional riders, but the expected increase in ridership never materialized, and LVTS petitioned to return to the "hub and spoke" in January 1975. They then went back to the old hub and spoke route system and enjoyed an increase in ridership, as detailed in the 1978 magazine article.

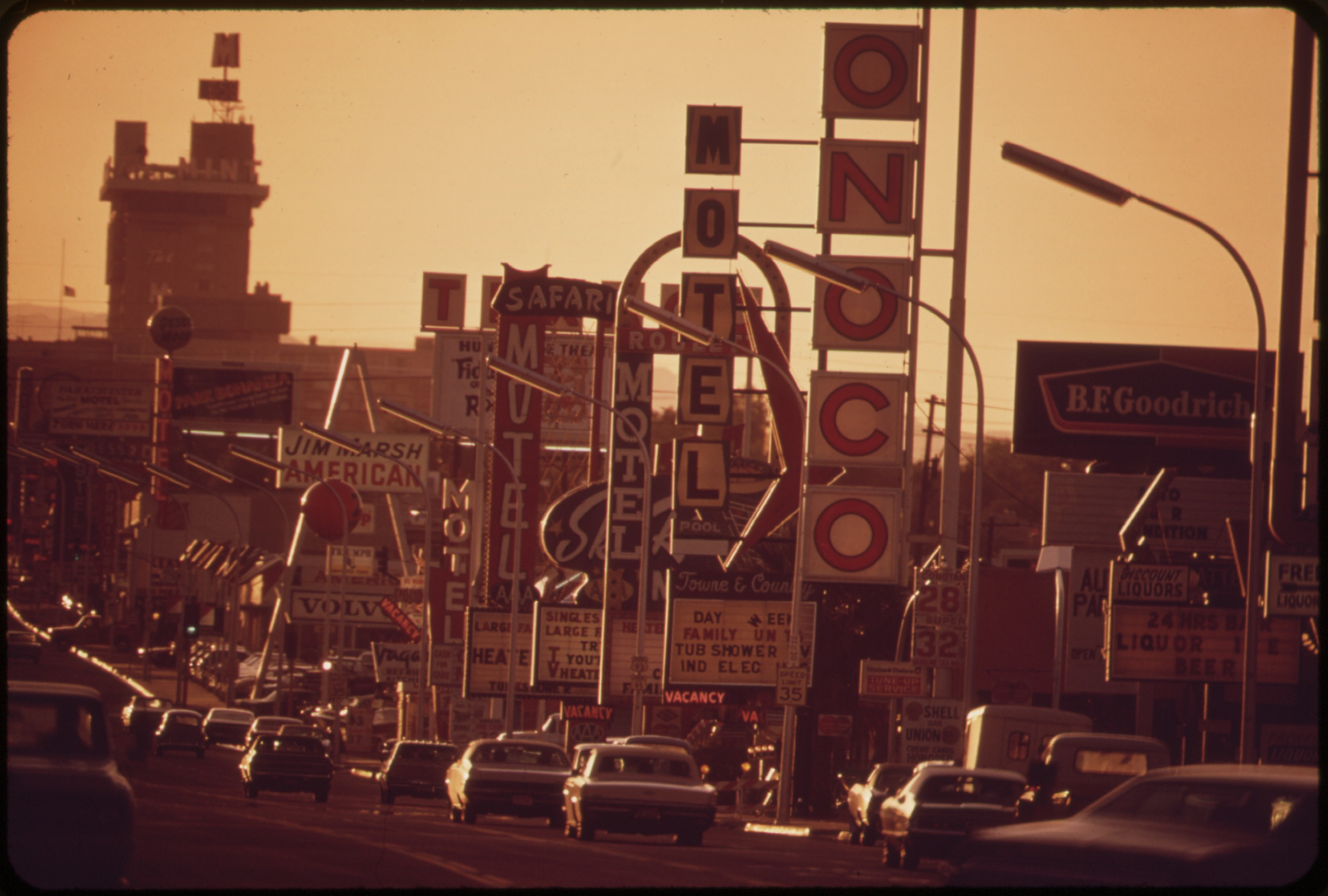
Traffic in Las Vegas. Photographed by Charles O'Rear for Documerica, 1972.

As in later decades, the #6 Strip route provided the money for the other money-losing residential routes and allowed the small private transit company to turn a profit. Being a successful private bus company is an exceptional feat, as by the 1960s, virtually all transit systems in the US had been taken over by municipal governments and heavily subsidized by taxpayer dollars due to declining ridership. By 1975, LVTS was operating at breakeven or a deficit, and any expansion would have to come via public subsidy.

In 1978, LVTS operated a fleet of 26 buses, with half of them less than 5 years old. During 1976–1977, ridership rose by 21.8%. However, by 1979, an external consultant concluded the system was one of the worst in the nation, and that at least 110 buses would be required to provide adequate service.

=== 1980s–1990s ===
In the early 1980s, the routes were all finally synchronized to arrive/depart at the downtown transfer center at the same time to facilitate passenger transfer, except for the more-frequently running Route #6. In order to hold fares steady, a public/private partnership was set up in 1980 where the Regional Transportation Commission of Southern Nevada would apply for federal funds for buses, and approximately 1/4 of the local matching funds would be provided by LVTS, with the remainder provided by RTC. In turn, RTC would lease the buses to LVTS at no cost. The first RTC-purchased buses arrived in September 1981.

In 1981, the State Futures Commission said that mass transit was the key issue in Clark County; a 1983 ballot proposal to fund an expansion of the system by raising sales taxes was voted down, though. According to Las Vegas Review-Journal articles at the time, LVTS claimed that government subsidies were needed to expand the coverage area and increase frequency of service. They contended the existing coverage with limited residential routes was dictated by the more lucrative Route #6 "Strip", which generated enough profit to support the current system. Even as the population grew by more than 60 percent between 1970 and 1980, residential density across the valley remained below 5 people per 1 acre (0.40 ha), and the system had developed a ridership base concentrated among transit dependent populations, including low income residents and those without access to a vehicle. 60% of LVTS riders were tourists, nearly all riding #6 "Strip". The small coverage area made it difficult for people to use the buses, and ridership was limited to those who had no means of private transportation.

In addition, even though Route #6 "Strip" was the busiest and tourist oriented, that route was operated with the oldest equipment, including the smallest 35 foot (11 m) GM New Look buses. The air conditioning units on these older buses were frequently out of service. By contrast, some of the residential routes, with few passengers, were operated with the newest buses, which were city-owned, 40 foot (12 m), Grumman 870s and Gillig Phantoms. One reason for this was the city mandated that these newer city-owned buses, which also had accessibility features, run on the residential areas.

Routes in 1992 (Note: Based on schedule published in Nov 1991.) (Note: Routes connect downtown, except as noted. Downtown routes are synchronized for same-time departure.)
No.	Name	Headway (min)	Runs/ day	Days/ wk	Buses required
1	Hyde Park	60	13	7	1
2	North Las Vegas	60	10-19	6 (Note: No service Sundays or holidays)	1
3 (Note: Bidirectional service)	Salt Lake Hwy	30 (Note: During AM/PM peak)		7	2
3	Salt Lake Hwy	60		7	1
4	Boulder Hwy	60	13 1/2	7	1
5	Huntridge	60	13	7	1
6 (Note: 24-hour service)	Strip	≤15		7	
6A (Note: Does not connect at Downtown Transfer Center.)	Sam's Town/ Strip	60		6	1
7	College Park	60	13	7	1
8	Golfridge	60	13	7	1
9	Vegas Heights	60	13	7	1
10	University	30	18 1/2	7	2
11	Henderson	60	10	6	1
12	Spring Valley	60	11 3/4	6	1
13	Strip Shuttle	20		7	(Note: Usually operated with the 5 secondhand MCI MC-5C buses)
14	Mall Hopper			6	2
–	Strip Express (Note: Offered limited stops between the Strip and downtown.)				(Note: Usually operated with the 4 New Flyer D60HF articulated buses.)
Notes

A limited expansion of coverage followed the late 1970s and early 1980s, but it was too little and too late. In fact, LVTS were voted as the worst transit system in the country during one year in the 1980s The city had outgrown the small private transit system; it was unrealistic for the city to expect a private bus company, without a taxpayer subsidy, to expand and run throughout the city based solely on its Strip revenue. LVTS were providing a public service, but they also needed to turn a profit to continue.

In 1990, the Las Vegas City Council rescinded the 48-year-old private franchise agreement in order to exert more control over public transportation services. That year, voters passed Question 10, which advised the state legislature to issue $100 million per year to fund mass transit in addition to a host of other transportation improvements, marking the start of what would become Citizens Area Transit. LVTS's general manager, Barry Perea, fought to keep LVTS in business and was strongly opposed to the formation of CAT, orchestrated by RTC chairman Bruce Woodbury after Clark County voters approved a quarter-cent sales tax increase in 1990 to fund a public transit system.

When Citizens Area Transit (CAT) started operating in November 1992, LVTS turned over all residential routes but clung onto the Route #6 "Strip" operation. The newer city-owned buses (Grumman 870s, GMC RTSs, and Gillig Phantoms) were returned and given to CAT. LVTS competed head to head with CAT on the Strip using their older buses from November 1992 until about April or May 1993, when they were bought out by the RTC for $900,000. The cash fare was $1.25 for a LVTS ride and $1 for a CAT ride at the time, indicating an effort by CAT to undercut Las Vegas Transit and speed its demise. What service remained, along with a few buses, was taken over by the affiliated Las Vegas Gray Line, which continued operating for decades afterward. Eventually taken over by Coach USA and renamed Transportation Unlimited, operation of the route finally ended in 2004, being conducted with six ex-Stockton CA RTSs at the end.

== Fares ==
In 1971, the one-way fare was $0.50; tokens could be purchased at a discount: 20 tokens for $0.35 each, and 6 tokens for $0.40 each. Legislation was being considered (AB 311) to reduce the fare to $0.20 for senior citizens. Although fares had not risen since the start of LVTS in 1965, those original fares were the most expensive in the United States.

The cash fare was first increased to $0.70 in 1976 and was $0.75 by 1978 with no charge for transfers. In October 1983, the fare was raised again to $0.90 with a $0.15 charge for transfers, and bumped to $0.95 in 1984.

In August 1987, published fares were increased to $1 for adults, $0.50 for seniors/disabled; transfers were $0.15, good for 2 hours (no round-trips nor stopovers).

In November 1991, fares were raised to $1.25 for adults and $0.60 for seniors/disabled, transfers were held at $0.15.

== Routes and operations ==
=== Structure and overview ===
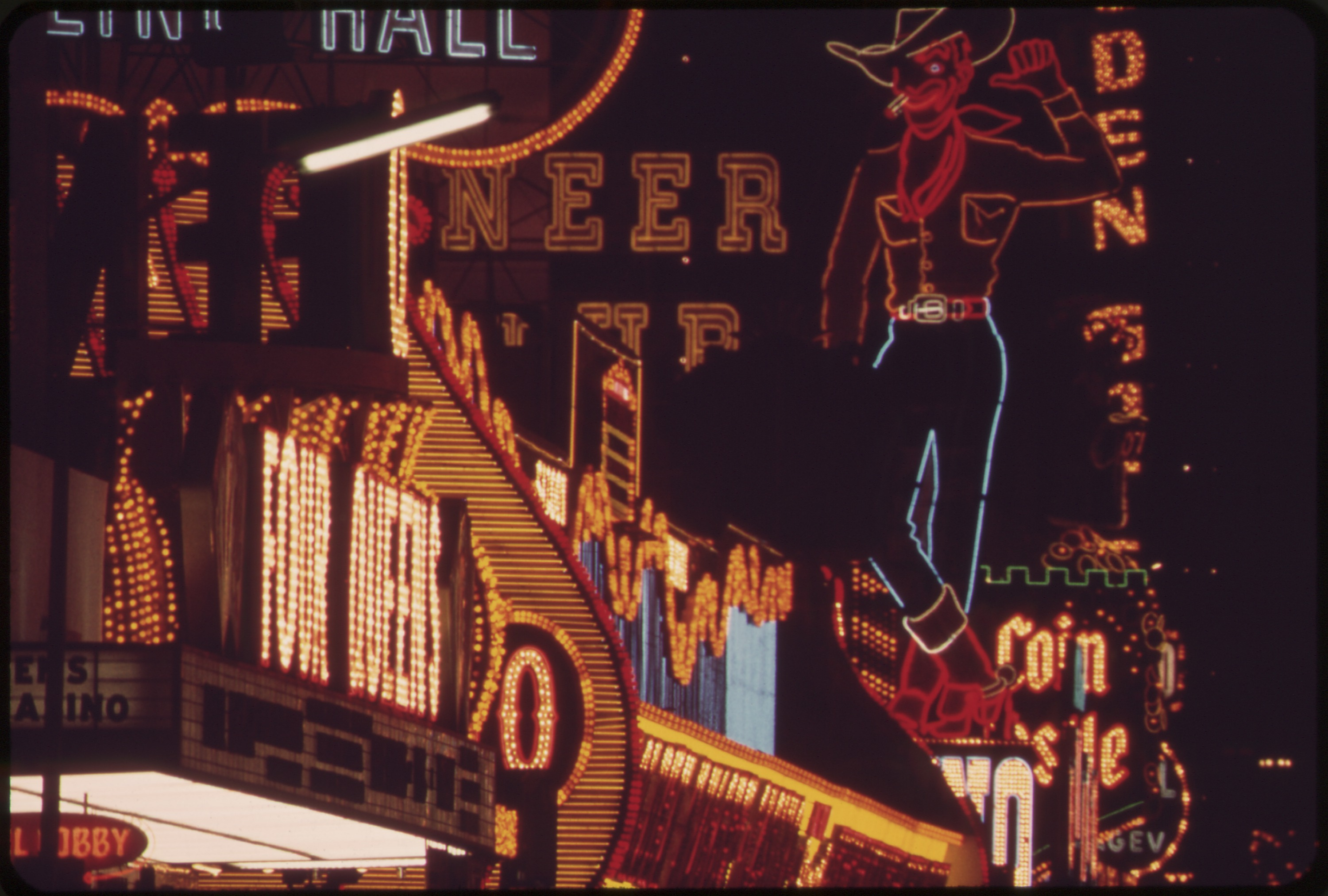
Neon signs in downtown Las Vegas. Photographed by Charles O'Rear for Documerica, 1972.

Las Vegas Transit's route structure for most of its existence used a "spoke and hub" system, similar to a wagon wheel. The "hub", where most routes met, was downtown Las Vegas. This was in contrast to most transit system, which generally use a "grid" system, as CAT currently does, or a combination of the "grid" and "spoke and hub" system. The reason LVTS used the "spoke and hub" system was simply to maximize coverage of area with the fewest buses. Instead of having a bus line run in both directions along the same street, most of LVTS routes were designed in one-way loops circling a section of the city before returning downtown. This method maximized the service area covered. Furthermore, it allowed riders to go to more places, as a rider could access most other routes via the Downtown Transportation Center. However, some bus riders had to circle the whole route before arriving at their destination, and in most cases, required a transfer downtown as well.

In the late 1970s, the system consisted of nine routes, numbered 1 through 10, without a Route #2. The residential routes were generally subsidized by the lucrative Route #6 "Strip/Downtown". Three of the nine routes were 24-hour routes: Route #3 "Salt Lake Hwy", #4 "Boulder Hwy", and #6 "The Strip". Routes #3, #4, and #9 had 30-minute headways and #6 "Strip" had 15-minute headways. Unfortunately, the routes were not synchronized to meet at the same time and sometimes, a rider had to wait up to 45 minutes for transfer to the next bus.

By the 1980s, arrivals/departures were synchronized, and the headways were increased on residential routes to 60–90 minutes, with limited operating hours, from about 5:30 AM to 10:00 PM. 24-hour service was limited to Route #6. Through the 1980s, LVTS also added several new residential routes: Routes #2 "North Las Vegas", #6A "Sam's Town/Strip", #11 "Henderson", and #12 "Spring Valley". They also added a Route #13 "Strip Shuttle", which benefited mostly the tourists on the Strip, connecting to the Las Vegas Hilton and the Las Vegas Convention Center along Las Vegas Blvd South and Paradise Road. In the late 1980s and early 1990s, they also added a Route #14 "Mall Hopper" to work the three major malls in Las Vegas at the time. In 1991, LVTS started the "Strip Express" with limited stops between downtown and several points on the Strip. These were used by both tourists and casino workers.

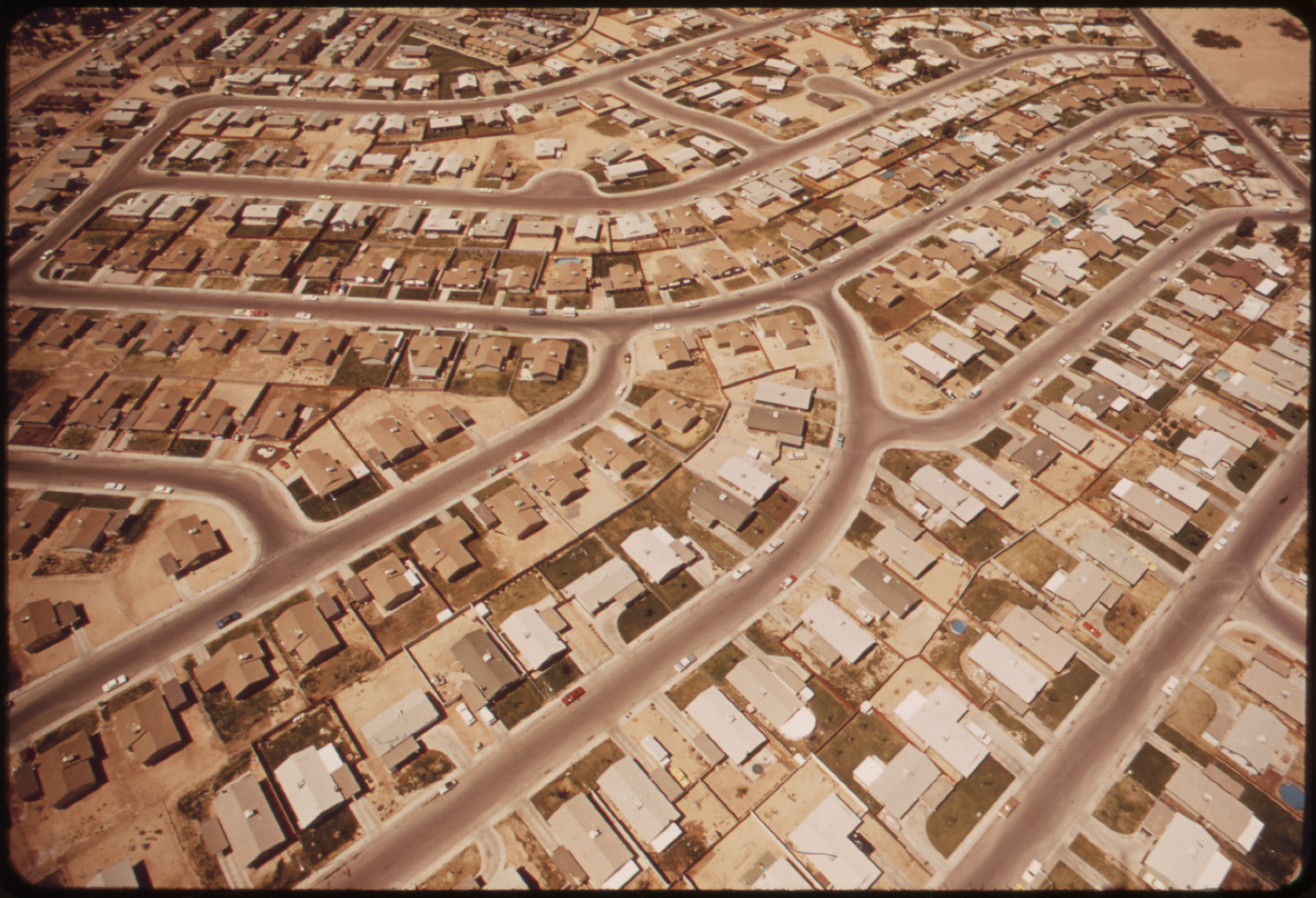
Suburban housing development in Las Vegas. Photographed by Charles O'Rear for Documerica, 1972.

LVTS was operating 16 different routes by the time they went out of business in 1992–93; almost all routes converged downtown, with the exceptions of Routes #6A, #11, #12, #13, and #14. Only three routes, #3, #4, and #6, ran in both directions along one particular street for its entire route.

=== Operations ===
After the route schedules were synchronized in the 1980s and onward, residential routes were run by two shifts of drivers, a morning and a swing shift. There were hour-long service interruptions on the residential routes three times a day: two times for meals (once during mid morning and again in early evenings), and once during mid afternoon to accommodate the shift change. This resulted in travel times of two to four hours for some Las Vegas Transit riders, if they were caught between these break times, as most routes required a transfer downtown.

After the Grumman 870 buses were delivered in 1982, when the newer handicap-accessible 870s broke down on a residential route, it was usually substituted by a RTS or old New Look fishbowl. Handicap passengers were told on their printed schedules to call ahead of time regarding availability of a handicap-accessible bus. The old buses, mostly the "fishbowls" from the 1960s to the 1970s, were relegated to Route #6 "Strip", along with the RTSs. This route ran between downtown and going as far south on Las Vegas Boulevard as the old Hacienda hotel. Although the air-conditioned RTSs were also assigned to the #6 Strip, the majority of equipment on this route were still the older fishbowl buses. By the 1980s, the air conditioning units on a number of these older buses had failed, and ran with open windows on the crowded route. During peak hours of the day, the #6 Strip buses were packed and often had to pass passengers waiting at the bus stops.

As newer buses from Gillig were acquired, some of the 870s were then also relegated to the busy Route #6 and they must have been a welcome relief as they usually had working air conditioners. However, the 870s were also required in some residential routes as replacement buses for broken-down Gilligs and also as second buses on some of the busier routes, such as Route #3 "Salt Lake Highway" (one of the few bidirectional routes) and Route #10 "University". These two routes required two buses during peak morning and afternoon hours. Also, Route #1 "Hyde Park" often needed an extra bus for second runs. LVTS never published a time schedule for this second run bus on the "Hyde Park" route. It just ran 30 minutes apart from the regularly scheduled bus.

LVTS also experimented with a couple of new routes in its last years of service, including the #14 "Mall Hopper", which required two air-conditioned buses. Starting in the early 1990s, LVTS also started buying a few used and new RTSs for the Route #6 "Strip", again with working air conditioners. But, even then, because of the large number of buses required to service the busy Strip route, workhorses of the Strip fleet continued to be the good old, reliable fishbowl buses, some that were over 20 years old. In fact, LVTS ran some of the oldest buses in the USA. Because of criticism from the newspapers and city about the old, non-air conditioned buses, LVTS did fix the air-conditioning on a number of the old fishbowls.

== Fleet ==
=== Vehicles ===
From 1964 to about 1981, LVTS primarily operated the GM New Look (Fishbowl) Bus. Starting in 1981, LVTS began to supplement its fleet with leased buses which had been purchased by the city of Las Vegas: 5 GMC Rapid Transit Series (RTS) buses (1981); 12 Grumman/Flxible 870s (1982); and 13 Gillig Phantoms (1990). The Grumman 870s were used mostly on the residential routes. The RTSs and Grumman 870s had accessibility features, while the older buses did not. The Phantoms (also accessible) mostly replaced the Grumman 870s.

LVTS itself purchased new and used air-conditioned buses in the early 1990s to get newer equipment on the overcrowded Strip route, replacing some of the older GM New Look buses. Six secondhand GMC RTS-01 buses were purchased in 1991 from San Jose, California; two new TMC RTS-06 buses were delivered in 1992.

In 1991, LVTS also bought four New Flyer D60HF articulated buses to run the "Strip Express" route with limited stops between downtown and several points on the Strip. LVTS also purchased five MCI MC-5C buses secondhand that had previously operated in Saudi Arabia. These MC-5Cs were designed with double roofs due to the desert climate of the Arabian Peninsula. They were designed to run on the "Strip Shuttle", which operated between the Las Vegas Hilton and the rest of the Strip hotels. By the end of its operations, LVTS had a fleet of 45 buses, 30 of which were leased from the city.

=== Livery and roster ===
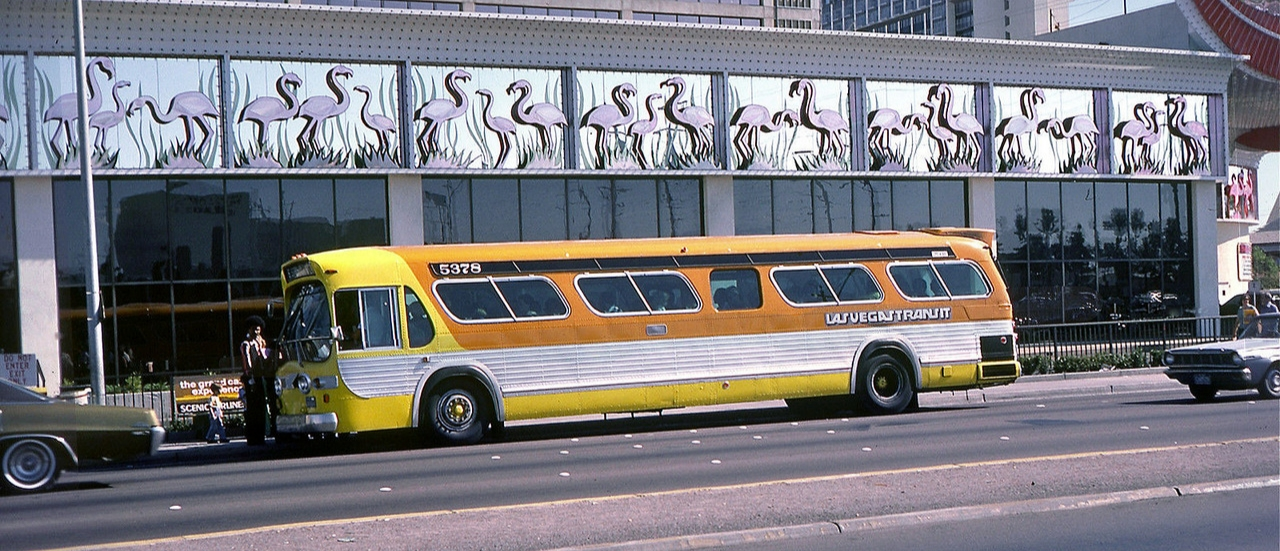
No. 5378, GM New Look in mid-1970s livery

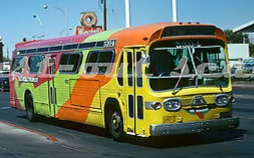
No. 5301, GM New Look named "Irving"

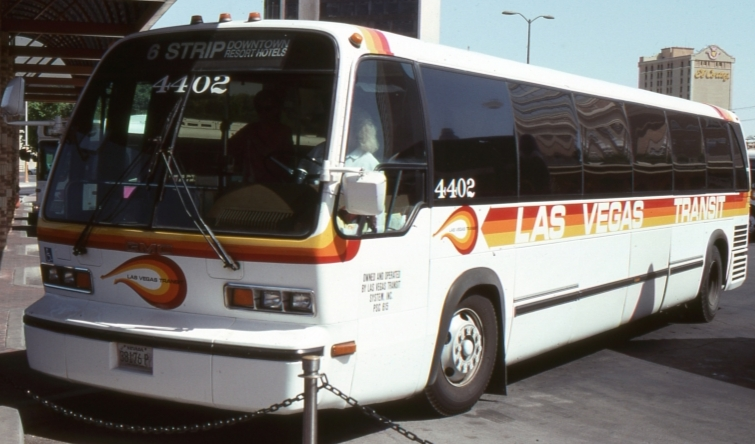
No. 4402, RTS in final livery

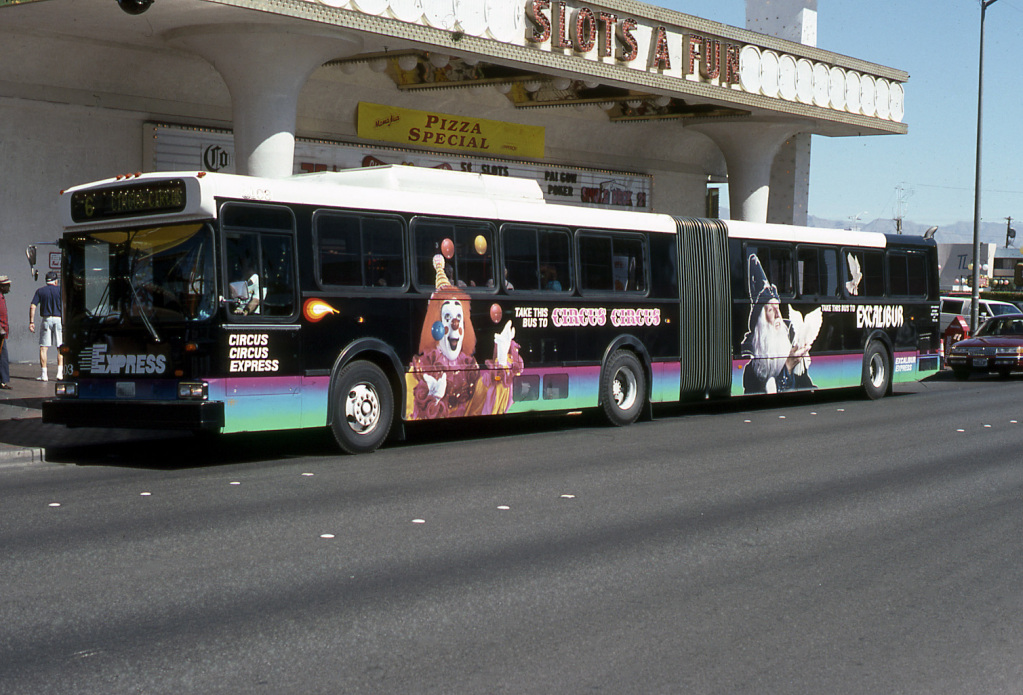
No. 6103, New Flyer D60HF in Circus Circus Strip Express livery

In 1973, a New Look bus was named "Irving" and painted in multiple bright colors with a "happy face". According to General Manager Gary Ballinger, this was done to "inject a little fun into the idea of bus riding" and mark the beginning of an upgrade and expansion campaign. During the mid-1970s, the scheme changed from a multi-color livery with cartoon faces (e.g. bus fronts painted w/ lips and a tongue sticking out or grinning teeth) to a more conservative livery of a belt line deep orange/orange/yellow with "Las Vegas Transit" on the side of the vehicle. This more professional paint scheme lasted until the end of transit operation in 1993.

Las Vegas Transit bus roster
Number (Qty)	Mfr.	Model	Image	Delivered	Notes
4301–4302 (2)	TMC	RTS-06		September 1992	Delivered new, serial numbers NR828750 & NR828751 for Strip service, later sold to Citizens Area Transit & renumbered 153-154
4401–4403 (3)	GMC	RTS-04	Las Vegas Transit RTS 4402	1991	Acquired used from Southwest Coaches (San Diego CA, ex-101-103, originally built 1983–84) for Strip service, later sold to Citizens Area Transit & renumbered 150-152
4500–4510 (11)	GMC	New Look (TDH4517)	Las Vegas Transit GMC New Look 4512	1965	Serial numbers 0502-0512, 0516. Built in 1960 & acquired used for start of LVTS service in 1965 from Oklahoma City (ex-701-711, 715).
4517–4520 (4)	GMC	New Look (T6H4521A)		1977	Serial numbers 0248-0251. Built in 1969 & acquired used from Sun Valley Bus Lines (ex-401-404)
4521–4525 (5)	GMC	RTS-04	Las Vegas Transit 1981 GMC RTS 4525	November 1980	Acquired new (Las Vegas city owned), later transferred to Citizens Area Transit & renumbered 101-105
4536–4540 (5)	MCI	MC-5C	Las Vegas Transit MCI 4536	1991	2 door Highway buses bought used 1991 from Greyhound-Taseco (Saudi Arabian operations) 2021, unknown, 2060, 2094, unknown. They were used mostly on the "Strip shuttle" route, although occasionally making forays into the residential routes when the regular bus broke down.
4541–4546 (6)	GMC	RTS-01 (TH8201)	Las Vegas Transit GMC RTS 4546	1991	Originally built Sep 1978 for Santa Clara County (ex-1002, 1012, 1031, 1037, 1039, 1058). Acquired used for Strip service.
4550–4551 (2)	GMC	New Look (TDH4519)	Las Vegas Transit GMC New Look 4512	November 1965	Acquired new, serial number 0899-0900 for Tanner Motor Tours; renumbered to 4510-4511 in 1977
4552–4553 (2)	GMC	New Look (T6H4521A)	Las Vegas Transit GMC New Look 4512	May 1969	Acquired new, serial number 0331-0332; renumbered to 4512-4513 in 1977
4554 (1)	GMC	New Look (T6H4521A)	Las Vegas Transit GMC New Look 4512	July 1971	Acquired new, serial number 0739; renumbered to 4514 in 1977
4555–4556 (2)	GMC	New Look (T6H4523A)	Las Vegas Transit GMC New Look 4512	July 1973	Acquired new, serial number 0505-0506; renumbered to 4515-4516 in 1977
4601–4612 (12)	Grumman	870	Las Vegas Transit 4605	August 1982	Acquired new, serial numbers CD094476-CD094487 (Las Vegas city owned), later transferred to Citizens Area Transit & renumbered 254-261, 250-253
4701–4713 (13)	Gillig	Phantom	Las Vegas Transit 1990 Gillig Phantom 4702	1991	Acquired new (Las Vegas city owned), later transferred to Citizens Area Transit & renumbered 301-313
5301–5304 (4)	GMC	New Look (T6H5306A)	Las Vegas Transit GMC New Look 5301 Las Vegas Transit GMC New Look 5371	February 1968	Acquired new, serial number 0011-0014; renumbered to 5371-5374 in 1977
5305 (1)	GMC	New Look (T6H5306A)	Las Vegas Transit GMC New Look 5379	July 1971	Acquired new, serial number 0865; renumbered to 5375 in 1977
5306–5307 (2)	GMC	New Look (T8H5308A)		October 1974	Acquired new, serial number 0221-0222; renumbered to 5376-5377 in 1977
5308–5309 (2)	GMC	New Look (T8H5308A)	Las Vegas Transit GMC New Look 5378	September 1976	Acquired new, serial number 0449-0450; renumbered to 5378-5379 in 1977
6101–6104 (4)	New Flyer	D60HF	Las Vegas Transit 1991 New Flyer D60HF 6103	1991	Articulated buses acquired new for "Strip Express" route, serial number 14080-083; later sold to Citizens Area Transit & renumbered 500-503
