= Regional Transportation Commission of Southern Nevada =

American transit authority

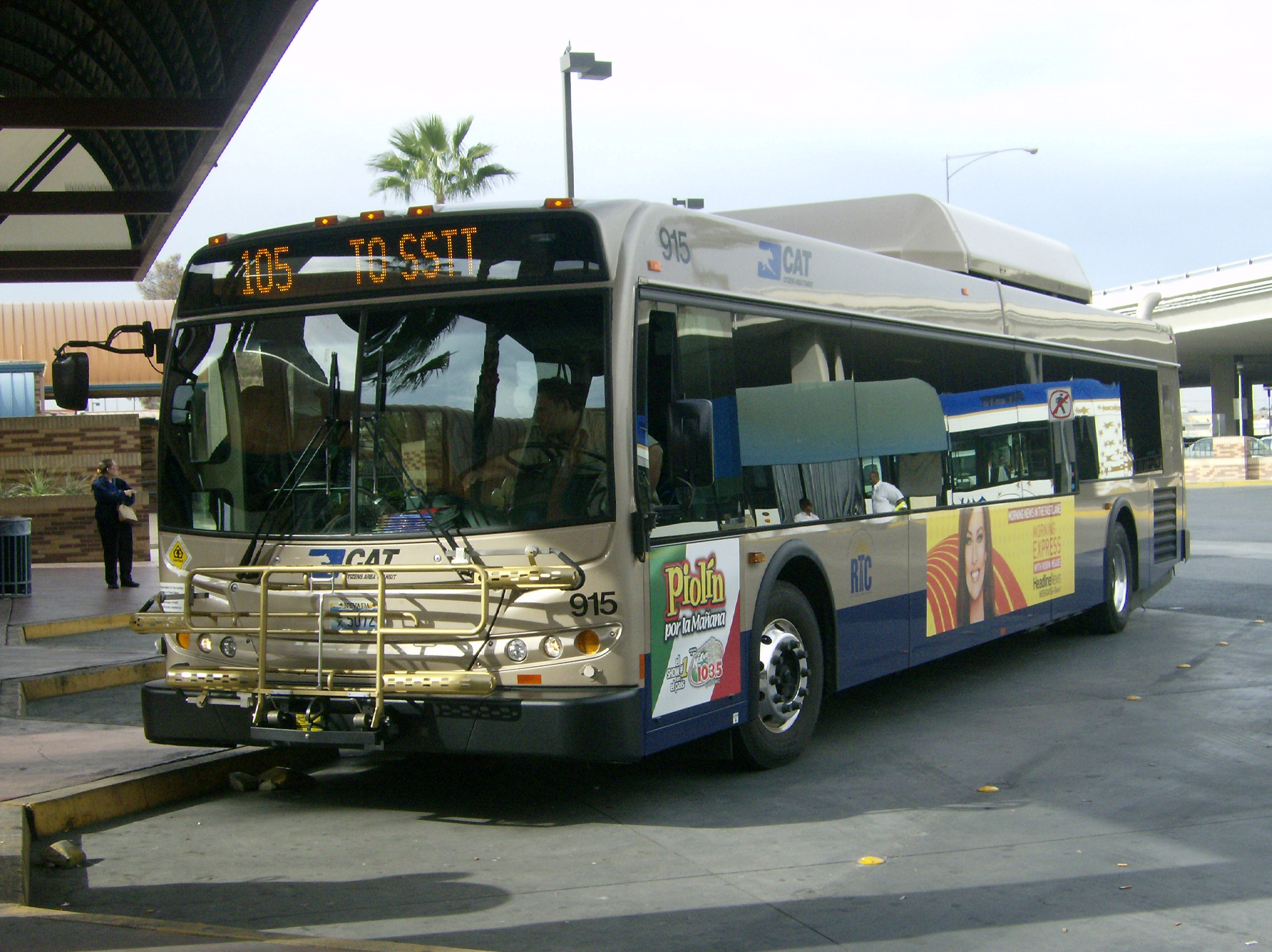
- #915 (under the Citizens Area Transit brand) at the downtown transit center on the 105.
- Founded: 1965; 61 years ago by the Nevada Legislature
- Headquarters: Las Vegas, Nevada, U.S.
- Locale: Southern Nevada
- Service area: Clark County
- Service type: Local bus transit and highways
- Operator: Transdev (fixed-route); MV Transportation (paratransit)
- Chief executive: M.J. Maynard
- Website: rtcsnv.com

The Regional Transportation Commission of Southern Nevada (RTC or RTCSNV) is a government agency and the transit authority and the transportation-planning agency for Southern Nevada. It was founded by the Nevada Legislature in 1965.

== RTC Transit ==
The Regional Transportation Commission of Southern Nevada (RTC) transit fleet consists of 39 routes served by over 400 vehicles. In 2009, RTC Transit carried 57,738,930 passengers in the greater Las Vegas Valley. RTC Transit consists of 33 fixed route service routes, four express service routes, and the Las Vegas Strip route "The Deuce".

== Services ==
=== Transportation ===
- RTC Transit - All public transportation routes available to the public
- RTC Paratransit - A service for disabled riders.
- SilverSTAR & FDR - A service for senior riders.
- Bikeshare - A bike rental service.
- Transit Centers and Park & Ride Facilities - Transportation hubs and park and ride lots located throughout the Las Vegas Valley

=== Programs ===
- Bike & Ride - A training program to train riders to use a bicycle and buses altogether
- Club Ride - A free carpooling program.
- Mobility Training - A group training program to help disabled riders learn to use public transportation.

== RTC Commuter Services ==
The RTC provides a commuter service the CX that transports passengers from the Centennial Hills Transit Center and Park & Ride in the northwest, to Downtown, the Strip, and ends at the UNLV campus in the southeast and the DVX from downtown to the veteran's hospital.

== Security ==
Security on the residential, express, and strip transit routes, and all RTC terminals and select platforms is provided by the private security firm Marksman Security under contract to the RTC. The previous contract holders were Allied-Barton until July 2020 and Wackenhut Security (now G4S) until losing the contract in 2009. Since then, increased crime in the Las Vegas Metropolitan area has prompted an increased security presence in the transit system as a whole. The officers’ primary task is that of fare enforcement, but will also engage in enforcing other RTC policies and rules, to include the removal of loiterers, those causing disturbances, and those posing safety hazards at RTC stops and facilities, and insuring the general safety of staff and customers.

On December 15, 2014, a fatal shooting occurred when Christopher Boudinot shot an RTC security officer. The officer returned fire and fatally shot Boudinot. The transit officer was rushed to UMC and eventually recovered while Boudinot was declared dead at the scene.

== See also ==
- RTC Transit
- Regional Transportation Commission of Washoe County
- Public transportation in Nevada
