= Transport in England =

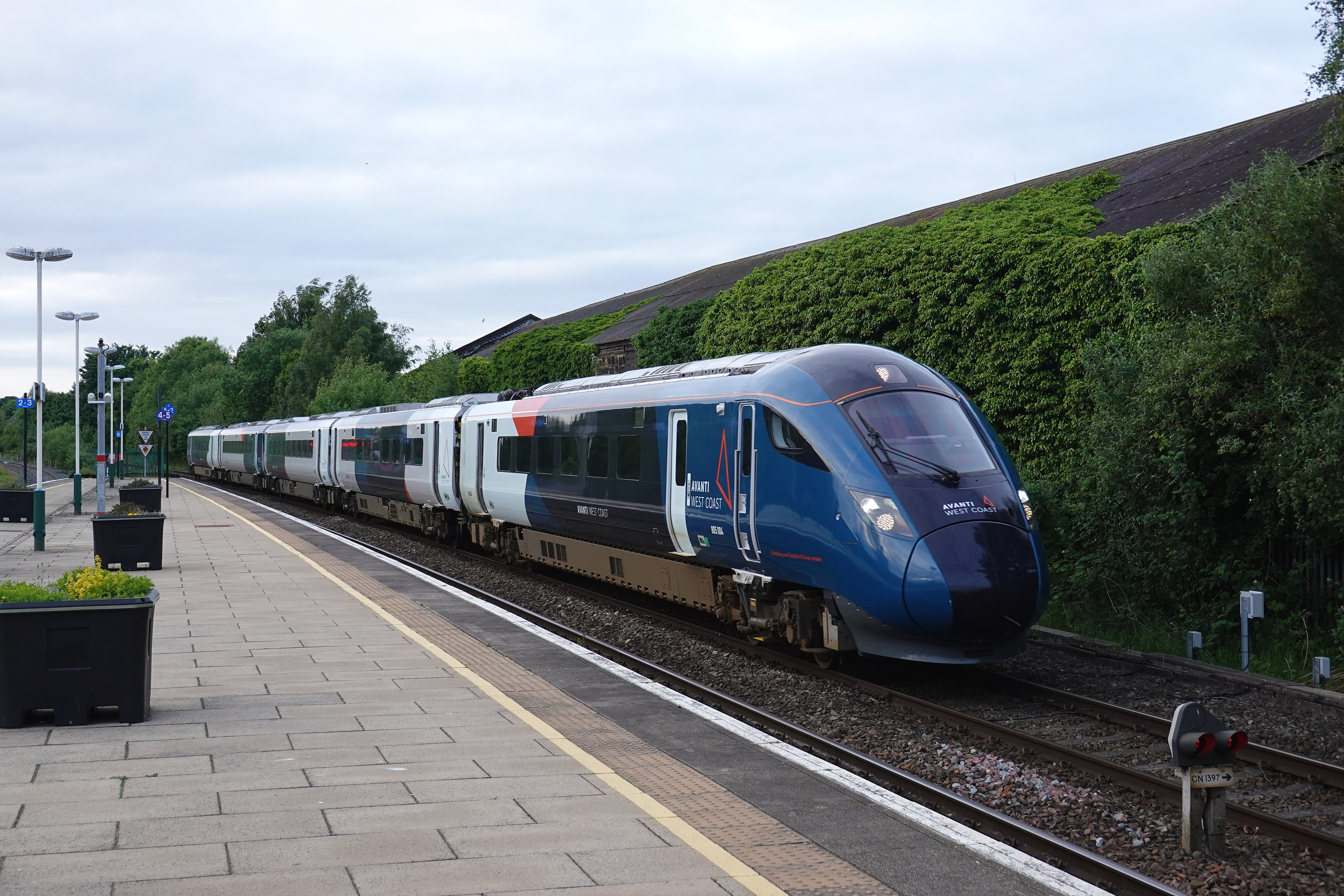
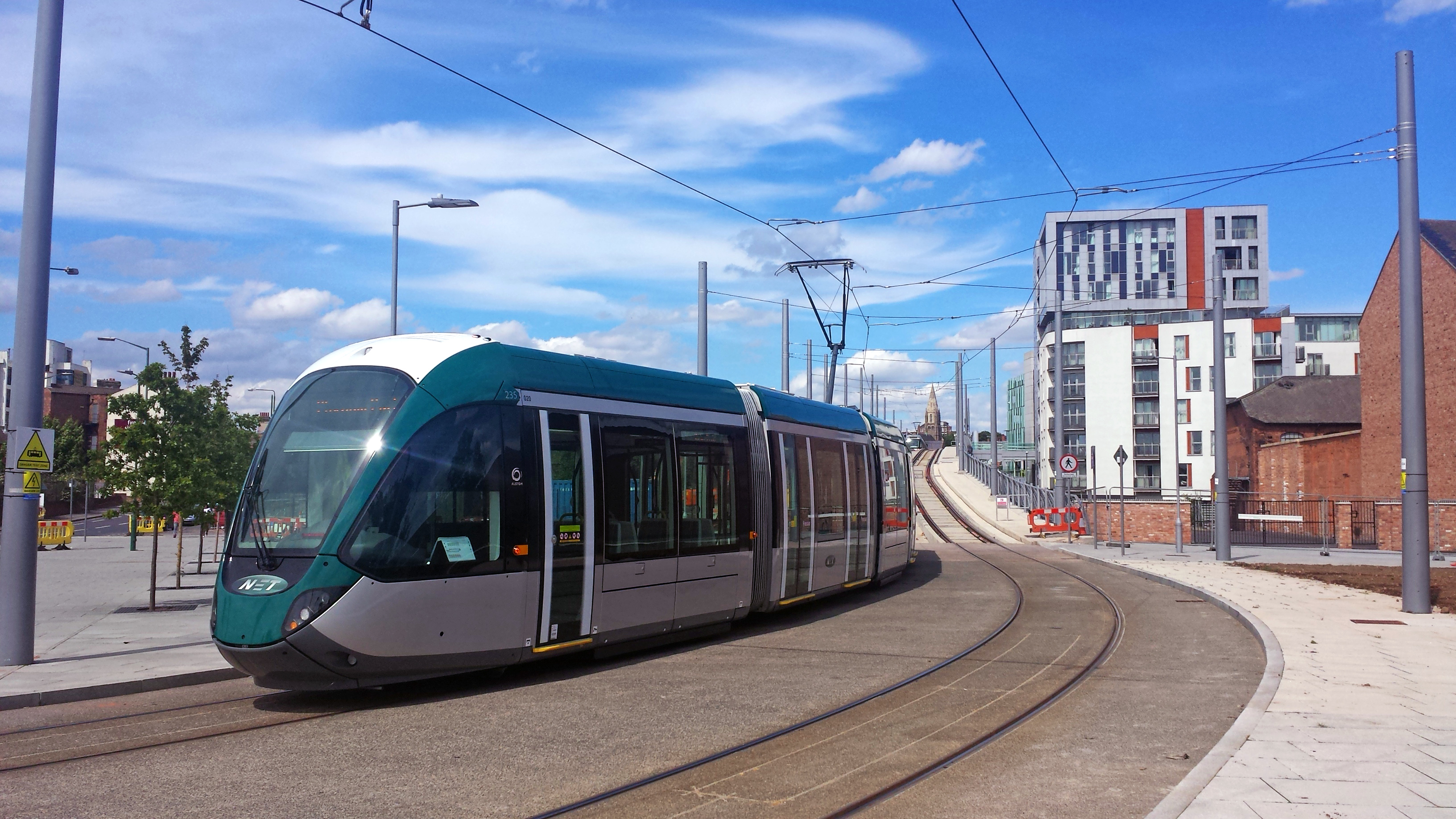
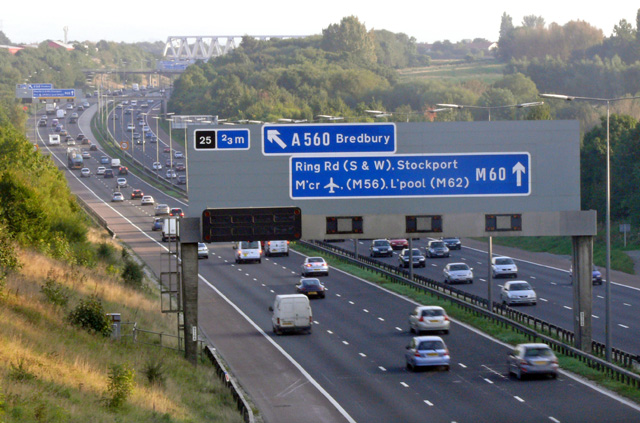
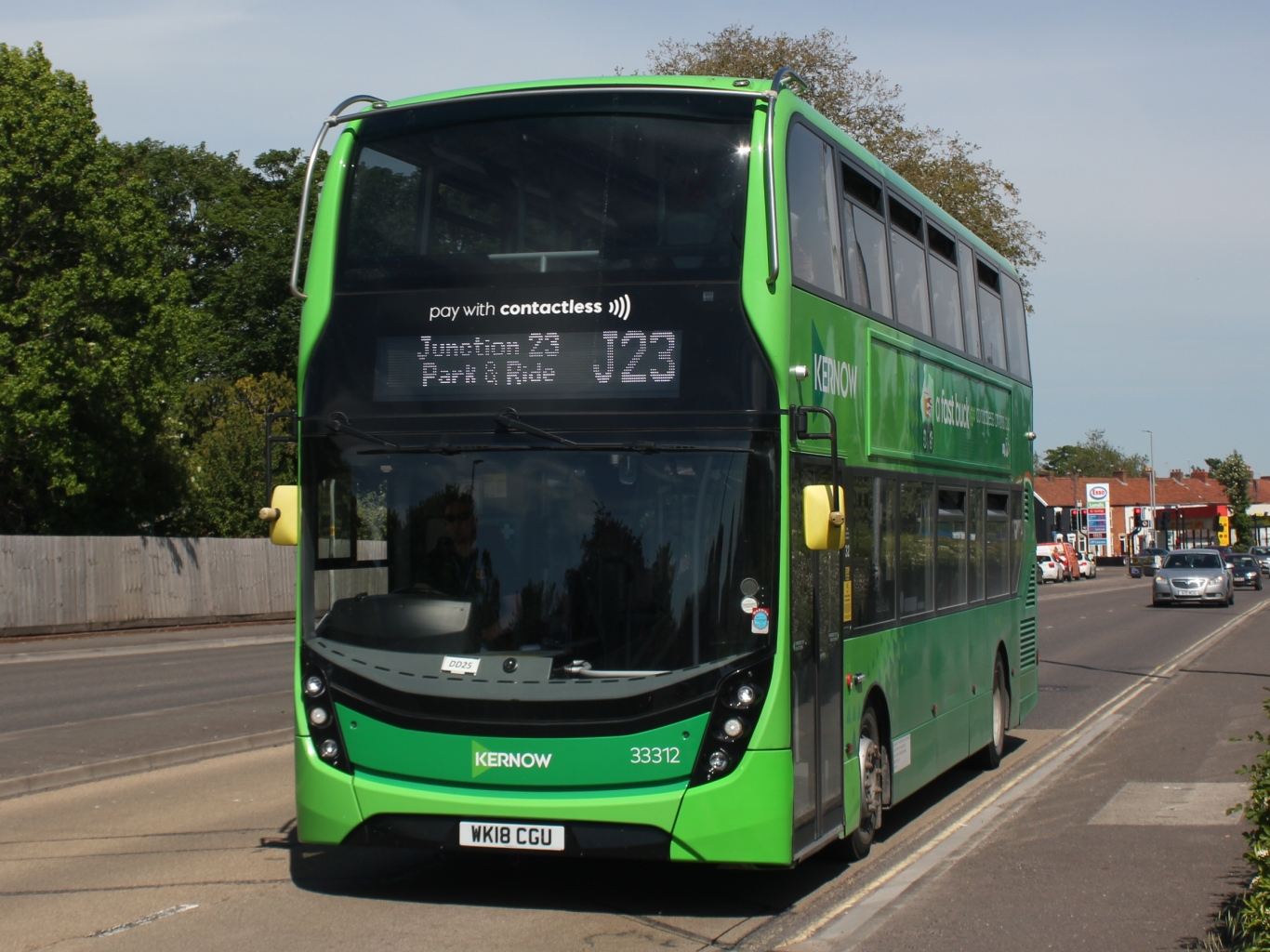
Examples of transport in England

Transport in England includes road, rail, air, and water networks. A wide road network totals 29,145 miles (46,904 km) of main roads, 2,173 miles (3,497 km) of motorways and 213,750 miles (344,000 km) of paved roads.

The National Rail network of 10,072 route miles (16,116 km) in Great Britain carries over 18,000 passenger and 1,000 freight trains daily. Urban rail networks and bus networks connecting cities and towns are widespread.

There are many regional and international airports, with Heathrow Airport in London one of the top ten busiest airports in the world, and the busiest in Europe. Transport by canal and navigable river, once important, is minimal. Shipping provides the primary means of transport for import and export of goods.

The Department for Transport is the government department responsible for the transport network in England. The Secretary of State for Transport is the member of the cabinet responsible to Parliament for transport.

== Transport trends ==
Passenger transport has grown in recent years. Figures show that total passenger travel inside the United Kingdom has risen from 403 billion passenger kilometres in 1970 to 793 billion in 2015.

Freight transport has undergone similar changes, increasing in volume and shifting from railways onto the road. In 1953, 89 billion tonne-kilometres of goods were moved, with rail accounting for 42%, road 36% and water 22%. By 2010, the volume of freight moved had more than doubled to 222 billion tonne-kilometres, of which 9% was moved by rail, 19% by water, 5% by pipeline and 68% by road. Despite the growth in tonne-kilometres, the environmental external costs of trucks and lorries in the UK have reportedly decreased. Between 1990 and 2000, there has been a move to heavier goods vehicles due to major changes in the haulage industry including a shift in sales to larger articulated vehicles. A larger than average fleet turnover has ensured a swift introduction of new and cleaner vehicles in England and the rest of the UK.

Figures from the Department for Transport (DfT) show in 2018 people made 4.8 billion local bus passenger journeys in England, 58% of all public transport journeys. There were 1.8 billion rail passenger journeys in England. Light rail and tram travel also continued to grow, to the highest level (0.3 million journeys) since comparable records began in 1983. Rail travel tends to be used for longer journeys. On average, people made 48 trips by bus and travelled 441 kilometres compared to 22 trips and 992 kilometres by rail in 2018. In 2018/19, there was £18.1bn of public expenditure on railways, an increase of 12% (£1.9bn).

In 2018/19, 272 million passenger journeys were made on the eight light rail and tram systems in England. 87% of adults in London walked at least once a week – the highest rate in the country. This was followed by Isles of Scilly (83%) and Richmond upon Thames (83%). 57% of adults in Cambridge cycled at least once a week. This was followed by Oxford (39%) and Isles of Scilly (35%).

== Road ==
The M6 motorway is the longest motorway in the United Kingdom. It is located entirely within England, running for just over 230 miles (370 km) from the Midlands to the border with Scotland.

The road network in Great Britain in 2006 consisted of 7,596 miles (12,225 km) of trunk roads (including 2,176 miles (3,502 km) of motorway), 23,658 miles (38,074 km) of principal roads (including 34 miles (55 km) of motorway), 71,244 miles (114,656 km) of "B" and "C" roads, and 145,017 miles (233,382 km) of unclassified roads (mainly local streets and access roads) – totalling 247,523 miles (398,350 km).

Road is the most popular method of transport, carrying over 90% of motorised passenger travel and 65% of domestic freight. The major motorways and trunk roads, many of which are dual carriageway, form the trunk network which links all cities and major towns. England contains a vast majority of the UK's longest motorways, dating from the first built in 1958 (part of the M6) to the most recent (A1(M)).

National Highways is responsible for maintaining motorways and trunk roads in England. Other English roads are maintained by local authorities. In London, Transport for London (TfL) is responsible for all trunk roads and other major roads, which are part of the Transport for London Road Network. The M25 is the largest and busiest bypass in the world.

The London low emission zone covers all of Greater London, the largest such zone in the world. The London Ultra Low Emission Zone started in 2019. Since 2015, more than 60 local authorities have been ordered to tackle illegal levels of air pollution and are planning to introduce clean air zones. In 2020, Oxford became the first city to implement a Zero Emission Zone (ZEZ) scheme. The plan is to expand the ZEZ gradually into a much larger zone, until the ZEZ encompasses the majority of the city centre by 2035.

Driving is on the left. The usual maximum speed limit is 70 mph (110 km/h) on motorways and dual carriageways. On 29 April 2015, the UK Supreme Court ruled that the government must take immediate action to cut air pollution, following a case brought by environmental lawyers at ClientEarth. The adoption of plug-in electric vehicles is actively supported by the DfT through the plug-in car and van grants schemes and other incentives. England has some of the highest number of electric vehicles on roads in Europe.

=== Bus transport ===
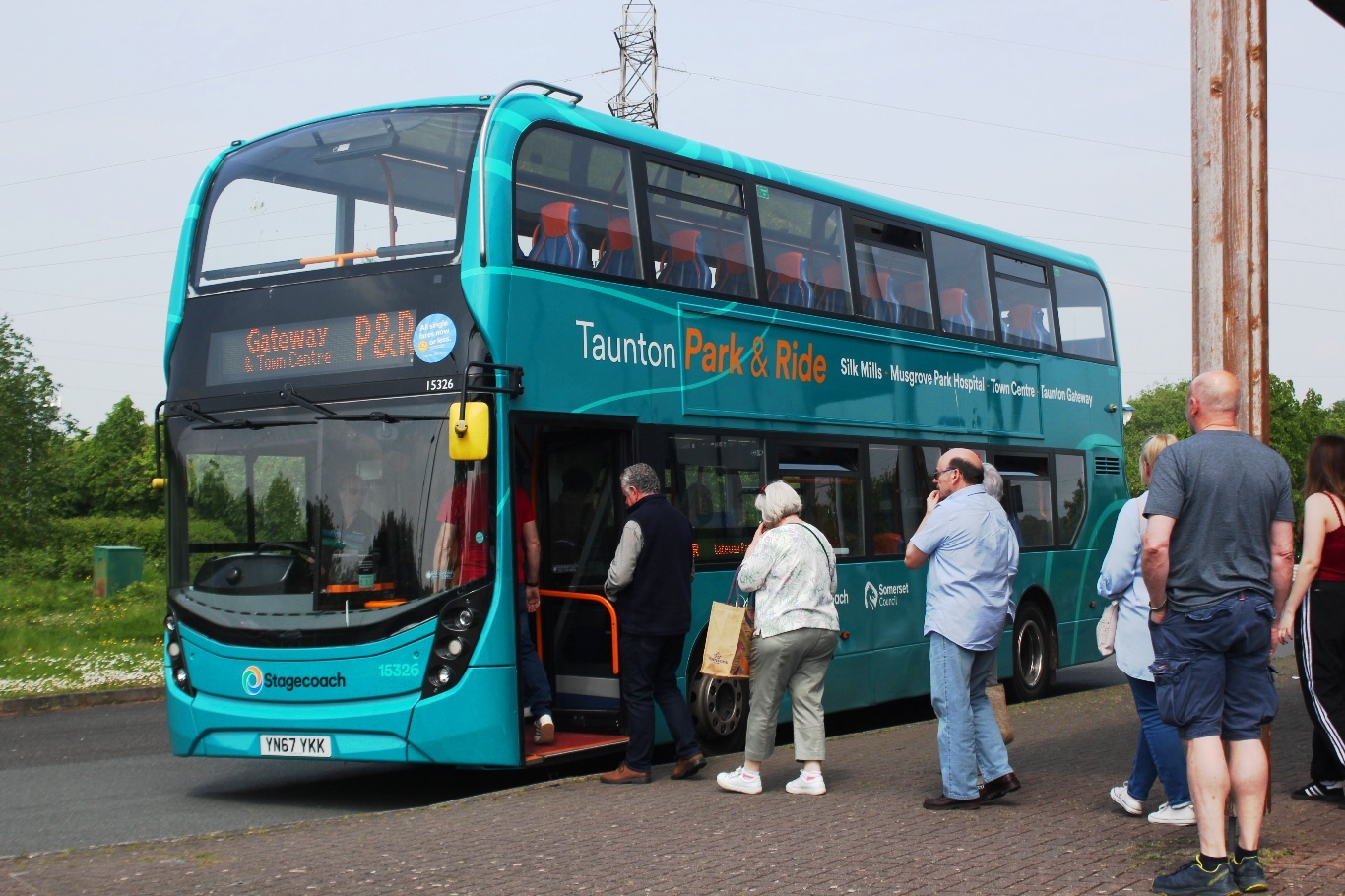
Bus in Somerset

Buses play a major role in the public transport of England, as well as seeing private use. England is covered by an extensive bus network throughout towns, cities and rural areas. It is estimated that 95% of the population live within 5 minutes walk of a bus stop.

Since deregulation, the majority (80% by the late 1990s) of local bus companies have been taken over by one of the "Big Five" private transport companies: Arriva, FirstGroup, Go-Ahead Group, Mobico Group and Stagecoach Group. A small number of towns and cities, such as Reading and Nottingham, retained public ownership of their bus networks; other cities and regions such as West Yorkshire and Manchester, are bringing their networks back under public control.

Bus transport remains the most popular mode of transport throughout England. Bus transport is heavily subsidised. In 2014/15, there were 4.65 billion bus journeys in England, 2.4 billion of which were in London. Alternative methods of power for buses have been introduced in English cities to make transport less polluting and more sustainable in England. This will help the government's target to reach net zero emissions by 2050. In 2021, TfL introduced 20 hydrogen double-deckers, and in 2024, Reading Borough Council announced the introduction of a fleet of electrically-powered buses and associated infrastructure for the town.

== Rail ==
England's railway transport is largely based on services originating from rail terminis in major cities, operating in all directions on tracks mostly owned by Network Rail. The rail network in Great Britain is the oldest such network in the world. The system consists of five high-speed main lines (the West Coast, East Coast, Midland, Great Western and Great Eastern), which radiate from London to the rest of the country, augmented by wide regional rail lines and dense commuter networks and other high-speed lines within major cities and towns. High Speed 1 is operationally separate from the rest of the network, and is built to the same standard as the TGV system in France. Eurostar operates high-speed trains via the Channel Tunnel to France, Belgium and the Netherlands through the Channel Tunnel under the English Channel, at 23.5 miles (37.8 km) long it's the world's longest undersea tunnel.

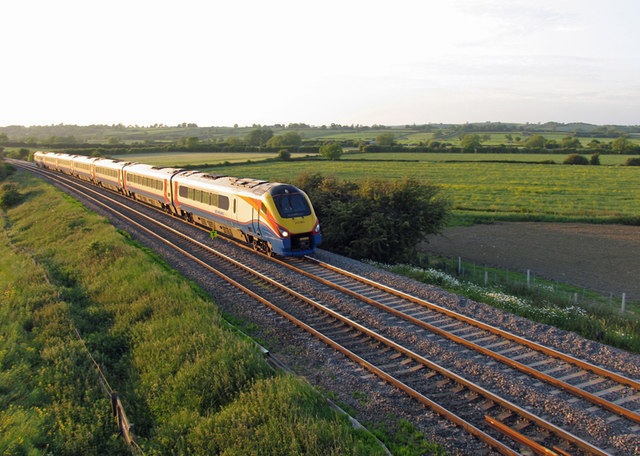
East Midlands Railway train in Leicestershire

The world's first passenger railway running on steam was the Stockton and Darlington Railway, opened on 27 September 1825. Just under five years later the world's first intercity railway was the Liverpool and Manchester Railway, designed by George Stephenson and opened by the Prime Minister, the Duke of Wellington on 15 September 1830. The network grew rapidly as a patchwork of literally hundreds of separate companies during the Victorian era, which eventually was consolidated into just four by 1922, as the boom in railways ended and they began to lose money. Eventually, the entire system came under state control in 1948, under the British Transport Commission's Railway Executive. After 1962 it came under the control of the British Railways Board; then British Railways (later British Rail), and the network was reduced to less than half of its original size by the infamous Beeching cuts of the 1960s when many unprofitable branch lines were closed. Several stations have been reopened throughout England.

Opened in 1863, London Underground is the world's first underground railway. Known as the "Father of Railways", Stephenson's rail gauge of 4 feet 8 1/2 inches (1,435 mm) is the standard gauge for most of the world's railways. Henry Maudsley's most influential invention was the screw-cutting lathe, a machine which created uniformity in screws and allowed for the application of interchangeable parts (a prerequisite for mass production): it was a revolutionary development necessary for the Industrial Revolution.

In England, the infrastructure (track, stations, depots and signalling chiefly) is owned and maintained by Network Rail. Passenger services are operated by mostly public train-operating companies (TOCs), with private franchises awarded by the Department for Transport. Examples include LNER, Avanti West Coast, East Midlands Railway, Hull Trains and Lumo. Freight trains are operated by freight operating companies, such as DB Cargo UK, which are commercial operations unsupported by the government. Most train operating companies do not own the locomotives and coaches that they use to operate passenger services. Instead, they are required to lease these from the three rolling stock companies.

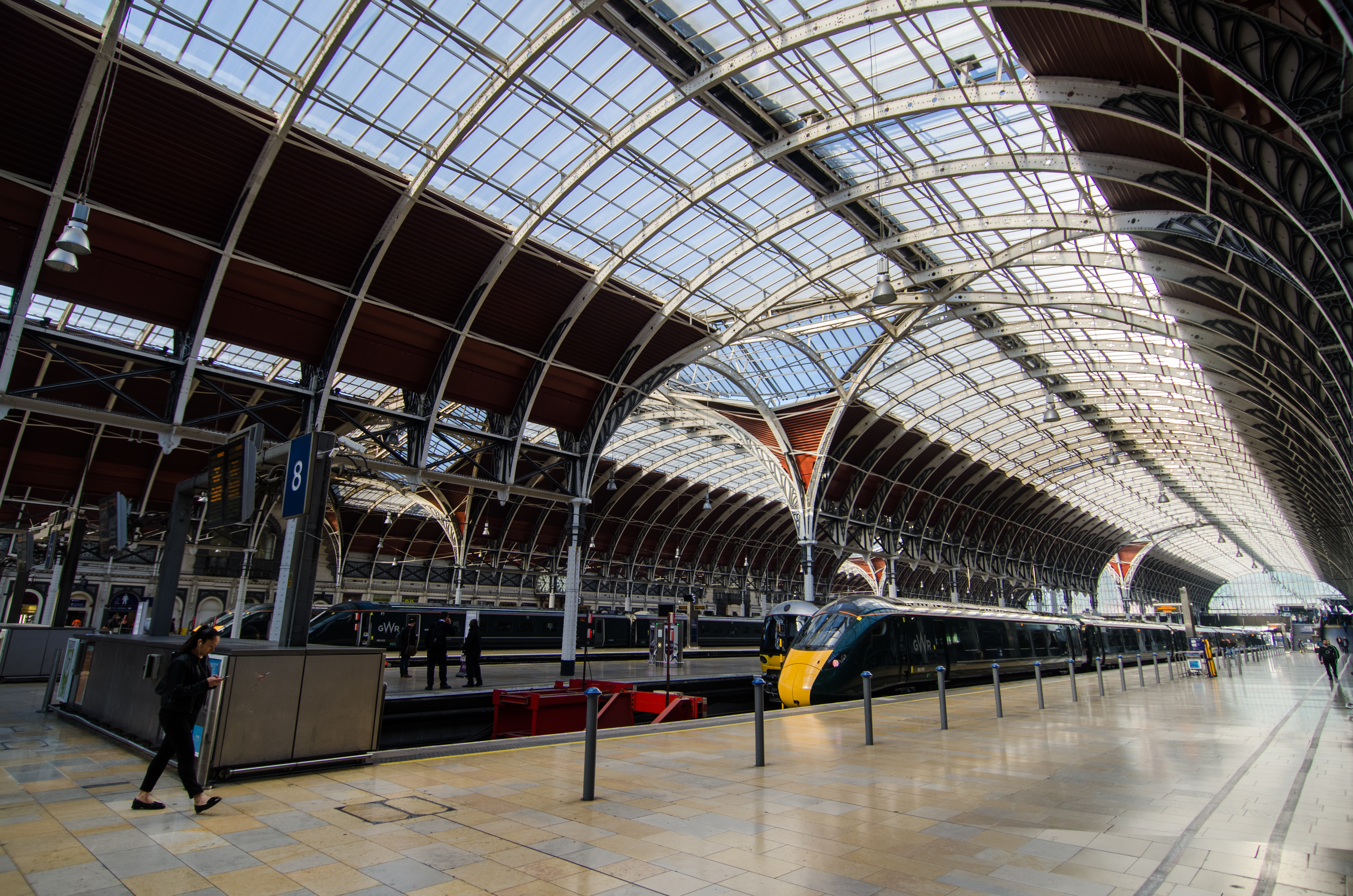
London Paddington Station is a major terminus for the Great Western Main Line with passenger services operated by Great Western Railway.

In Great Britain there is a 10,274 miles (16,534 km) of 1,435 mm (4 ft 8 1/2 in) gauge track, reduced from a historic peak of over 30,000 miles (48,000 km). Of this, 3,062 miles (4,928 km) is electrified and 7,823 miles (12,590 km) is double or multiple tracks. The maximum scheduled speed on the regular network has historically been around 125 mph (201 km/h) on the InterCity lines. On High Speed 1, trains are now able to reach the speeds of French TGVs. High Speed 2 (HS2) is a new high speed railway linking up London, the Midlands, the North and Scotland serving over 25 stations, including eight of Britain's ten largest cities and connecting around 30 million.

The Network North programme consists of hundreds of transport projects mostly in Northern England and Midlands, including new high-speed lines linking up major cities and railway improvements. To cope with increasing passenger numbers and a growing network, there is a large ongoing programme of upgrades to the network, including Thameslink, Crossrail, electrification of lines, in-cab signalling, new inter-city trains and new high-speed lines.

Short-distance travel that doesn't pass through London is generally referred to as cross country travel. Most services are operated by CrossCountry and often terminate in South East Wales or Scotland. Regional train services are also operated by these and train companies, and focus on the major cities, several of which have developed commuter and urban rail networks. This includes the London Overground and Merseyrail. The London Underground (commonly known as the Tube) is the oldest and one of the longest rapid transit systems in the world. The Office of Rail and Road is responsible for the economic and safety regulation of England's railways.

=== High-speed rail ===
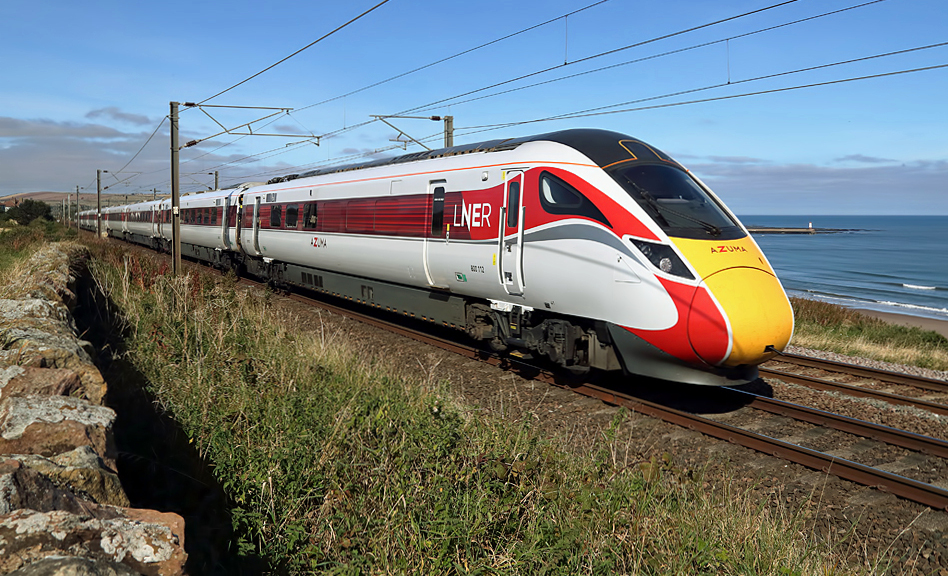
LNER Azuma high-speed train on the East Coast Line

During the age of steam locomotion, the railway industry in England strove to develop reliable technology for powering high-speed rail services between major cities. High-speed rail in England is provided on five upgraded railway lines running at top speeds of 125 mph (200 km/h) and one purpose-built high-speed line reaching 186 mph (300 km/h). Trains currently travel at 125 mph on the East Coast Main Line, Great Western Main Line, Midland Main Line, parts of the Cross Country Route, and the West Coast Main Line.

High Speed 1 (HS1) line connects London to the Channel Tunnel, with international Eurostar services running from St Pancras International to cities in France, Belgium, and the Netherlands at 186 mph (300 km/h). HS1 line was finished on time and under budget. The line is also used by high-speed commuter services from Kent to the capital. The Channel Tunnel Rail Link (CTRL) project saw new bridges and tunnels built, with a combined length nearly as long as the Channel Tunnel itself, and significant archaeological research undertaken.

Since 2019, construction has been ongoing on a major new purpose-built high-speed rail line, High Speed 2 (HS2) which will link London with major cities in the North and the Midlands at 224 mph (360 km/h) and reduce journey times to Scotland. Government-backed plans to provide east-west high-speed services between cities in the North of England are also in development, as part of the Northern Powerhouse Rail project.

=== Rapid transit ===
Current railway lines in the United Kingdom, Ireland and the Isle of Man are shown in black and metro lines in red.

Two cities in England have rapid transit systems. The most well known is the London Underground (commonly known as the Tube), the oldest rapid transit system in the world which opened 1863. It services Greater London and some parts of the adjacent home counties of Buckinghamshire, Essex, and Hertfordshire.

Another system also in London is the separate Docklands Light Railway. Although this is more of an elevated light metro system due to its lower passenger capacities; further, it is integrated with the London Underground in many ways. One other system, the Tyne and Wear Metro which opened in 1980, serves Newcastle, Gateshead, Sunderland, North Tyneside and South Tyneside, and has many similarities to a rapid transit system including underground stations, but is sometimes considered to be light rail.

=== Trams and light rail ===
Tram systems were popular in England in the late 19th and early 20th centuries. However, with the rise of the motor bus and later the car they began to be widely dismantled in the 1950s. By 1962, only Blackpool tramway remained. However, in recent decades trams have seen an extensive revival as have light rail systems. Examples of this second generation of tram systems and light rail include:

- Docklands Light Railway in East London
- Manchester Metrolink in Greater Manchester
- Nottingham Express Transit in Nottingham
- Sheffield Supertram in Sheffield
- Tramlink in Croydon
- Tyne and Wear Metro in Tyne and Wear
- West Midlands Metro in the West Midlands

== Cycling ==
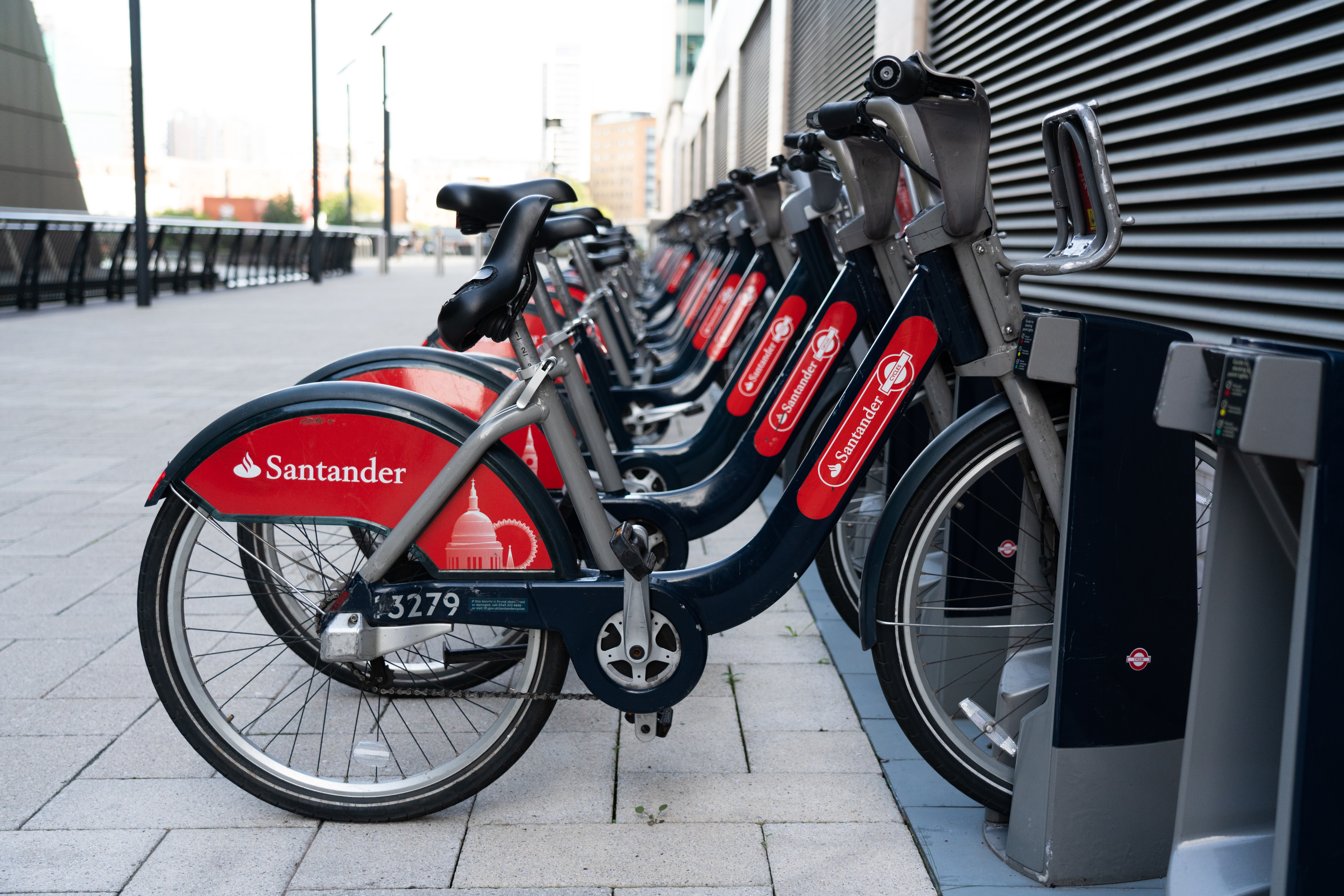
Santander Cycles is a major public bicycle hire scheme in London.

The National Cycle Network was established to encourage cycling and walking throughout England. It uses dedicated bike paths as well as roads with minimal traffic, and covers 14,000 miles (23,000 km), passing within one mile (1.6 km) of half of all homes. Other cycling routes such as The National Byway, the Sea to Sea Cycle Route, and local cycleways can be found across the country. Segregated cycle paths are being installed in cities and towns.

The DfT have made several key infrastructure investments, announcements and schemes to improve cycle infrastructure in England. In 2020, new funding for active travel infrastructure in England was announced. The government's stated aim is for England to be a "great walking and cycling nation" and for half of all journeys in towns and cities being walked or cycled by 2030. The plan accompanies £2 billion in additional funding over the following five years for cycling and walking. The plan also introduced a new body and inspectorate known as Active Travel England.

== Air ==
England is home to many of Europe's largest and busiest airports. London Heathrow, which handles over 80 million international passengers annually, is the largest airport in the UK. London serves as the largest aviation hub in the world by passenger traffic, with six international airports, handling over 180 million passengers in 2019, more than any other city. London's second-busiest airport, London Gatwick, was until 2016 the world's busiest single-runway airport. Manchester Airport is the United Kingdom's third-busiest airport. London Stansted and London Luton are the fourth and fifth busiest airports.

The largest airport operator is Heathrow Airport Holdings (owner of Heathrow), followed by Manchester Airports Group (owner of Manchester, Stansted and East Midlands). Together with British Airways and Virgin Atlantic, they are part of the Aviation Foundation.

== Water ==
Major canal building began in England after the onset of the Industrial Revolution in the 18th century. A large canal network was built and it became the primary method of transporting goods throughout the country; however, by the 1830s with the development of the railways, the canal network began to go into decline. There are currently 1,988 miles (3,199 km) of waterways in the United Kingdom and the primary use is recreational. 385 miles (620 km) is used for commerce.

== Education and professional development ==
England has a well-developed network of organisations offering education and professional development in the transport and logistics sectors. A number of universities offer degree programmes in transport, usually covering transport planning, engineering of transport infrastructure, and management of transport and logistics services. The Institute for Transport Studies at the University of Leeds is one such organisation. Public research universities like The Open University offer degrees in transport, logistics, civil engineering and management studies.

Pupils in England can study transport and logistics in apprenticeship studies at further education and sixth form colleges. Professional development for those working in the transport and logistics sectors is provided by a number of professional institutes representing specific sectors. These include:

- Chartered Institute of Logistics and Transport (CILT(UK))
- Chartered Institution of Highways and Transportation (CIHT)
- Chartered Institution of Railway Operators
- Transport Planning Society (TPS)

Through these professional bodies, transport planners and engineers can train for a number of professional qualifications, including:

- Chartered engineer
- Incorporated engineer
- Transport planning professional

== See also ==
- National Trails
- Transport in London
- Transport in the United Kingdom
- Climate Change Act 2008
