= Transport in the United Kingdom =

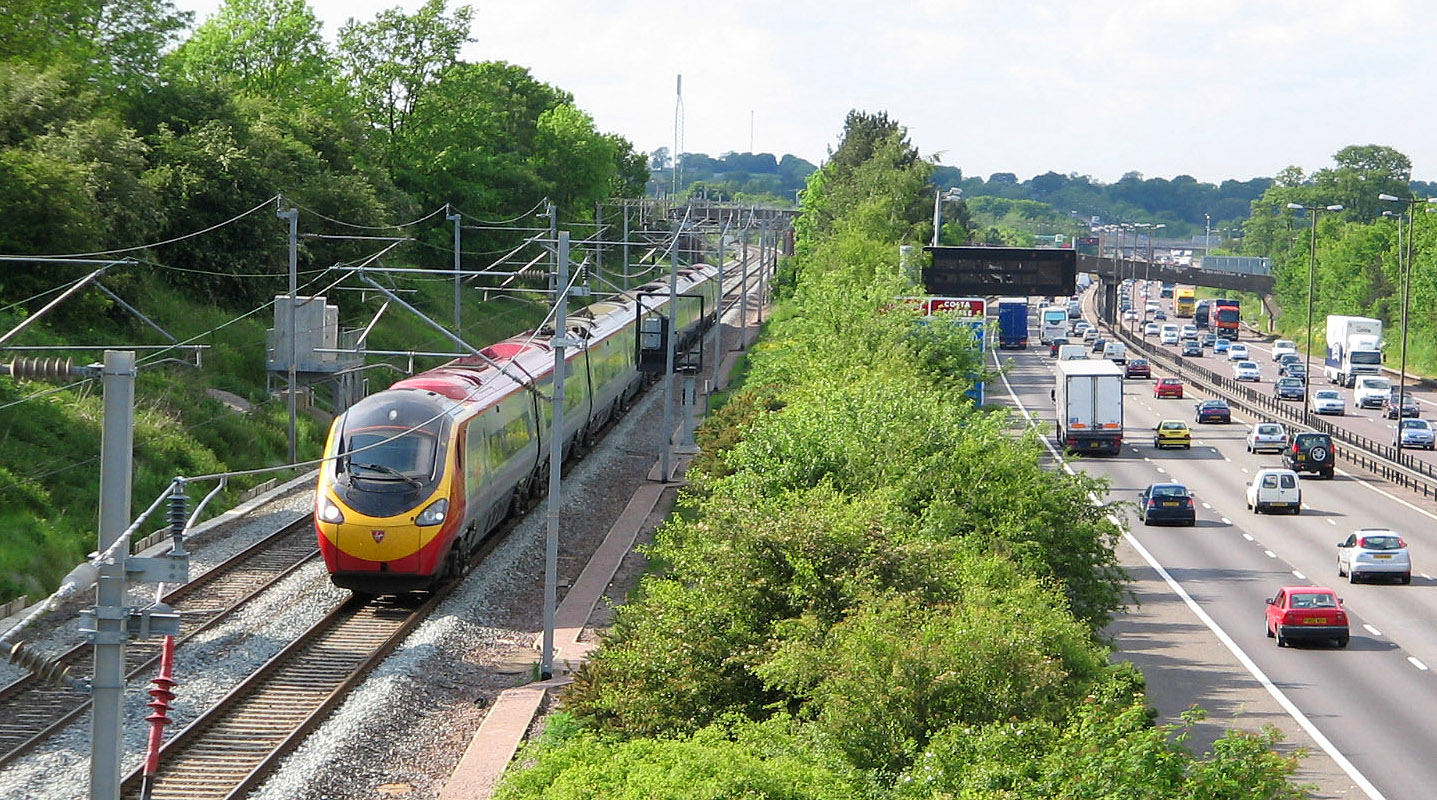
The Class 390 on the West Coast Main Line railway, alongside the M1 motorway in Northamptonshire

Transport in the United Kingdom is facilitated by road, rail, air and water networks. Some aspects of transport are a devolved matter, with each of the countries of the United Kingdom having separate systems under separate governments.

A radial road network totals 29,145 miles (46,904 km) of main roads, 2,173 miles (3,497 km) of motorways and 213,750 miles (344,000 km) of paved roads. The National Rail network of 10,072 route miles (16,116 km) in Great Britain and 189 route miles (303 km) in Northern Ireland carries over 18,000 passenger and 1,000 freight trains daily. Urban rail networks exist in all cities and towns with dense bus and light rail networks. There are many regional and international airports, with Heathrow Airport in London being one of the busiest in the world and busiest in Europe. UK ports handled 486 million tons of goods in 2019.

== Transport trends ==
Since 1952 (the earliest date for which comparable figures are available), the United Kingdom saw a growth of car use, which increased its modal share, while the use of buses declined, and railway use has grown. However, since the 1990s, rail has started increasing its modal share at the expense of cars, increasing from 5% to 10% of passenger-kilometres travelled. This coincided with the privatisation of British Rail. In 1952, 27% of distance travelled was by car or taxi; with 42% being by bus or coach and 18% by rail. A further 11% was by bicycle and 3% by motorcycle. The distance travelled by air was negligible.

Passenger transport continues to grow strongly. Figures from the Department for Transport show in 2018 people made 4.8 billion local bus passenger journeys, 58% of all public transport journeys. There were 1.8 billion rail passenger journeys in the United Kingdom. Light rail and tram travel also continued to grow, to the highest level (0.3 million journeys) since comparable records began in 1983. In 2018/19, there was £18.1bn of public expenditure on railways, an increase of 12% (£1.9bn). The average amount of time people wait at a stop or station for public transport in London and Manchester is 10 minutes.

Freight transport has undergone similar changes, increasing in volume and shifting from railways onto the road. In 1953 89 billion tonne kilometres of goods were moved, with rail accounting for 42%, road 36% and water 22%. By 2010 the volume of freight moved had more than doubled to 222 billion tonne kilometres, of which 9% was moved by rail, 19% by water, 5% by pipeline and 68% by road. Despite the growth in tonne kilometres, the environmental external costs of trucks and lorries in the UK have reportedly decreased. Between 1990 and 2000, there has been a move to heavier goods vehicles due to major changes in the haulage industry including a shift in sales to larger articulated vehicles. A larger than average fleet turnover has ensured a swift introduction of new and cleaner vehicles in the UK.

The adoption of plug-in electric vehicles is widely supported by the British government through the plug-in car and van grants schemes and other incentives. About 745,000 light-duty plug-in electric vehicles had been registered in the UK up until December 2021, consisting of 395,000 all-electric vehicles and 350,000 plug-in hybrids. In 2019, the UK had the second largest European stock of light-duty plug-in vehicles in use after Norway.

=== Greenhouse gas emissions ===
A critical issue for the transport sector is its contribution to climate change emissions. Transport became the largest sector of greenhouse gas emissions in 2016. Since 1990 carbon dioxide emissions from transport in the UK have reduced by just 4% compared with an economy-wide reduction of 43%. Emissions from surface transport accounted for 22% of carbon dioxide emissions in the UK in 2019 with cars being responsible for over half of that. The Climate Change Committee has suggested that transport will need to cut its emissions to zero by a mix of demand reduction, the adoption of more efficient combustion engine vehicles, changing to non-car based modes and electrification of the fleet.

== Air transport ==
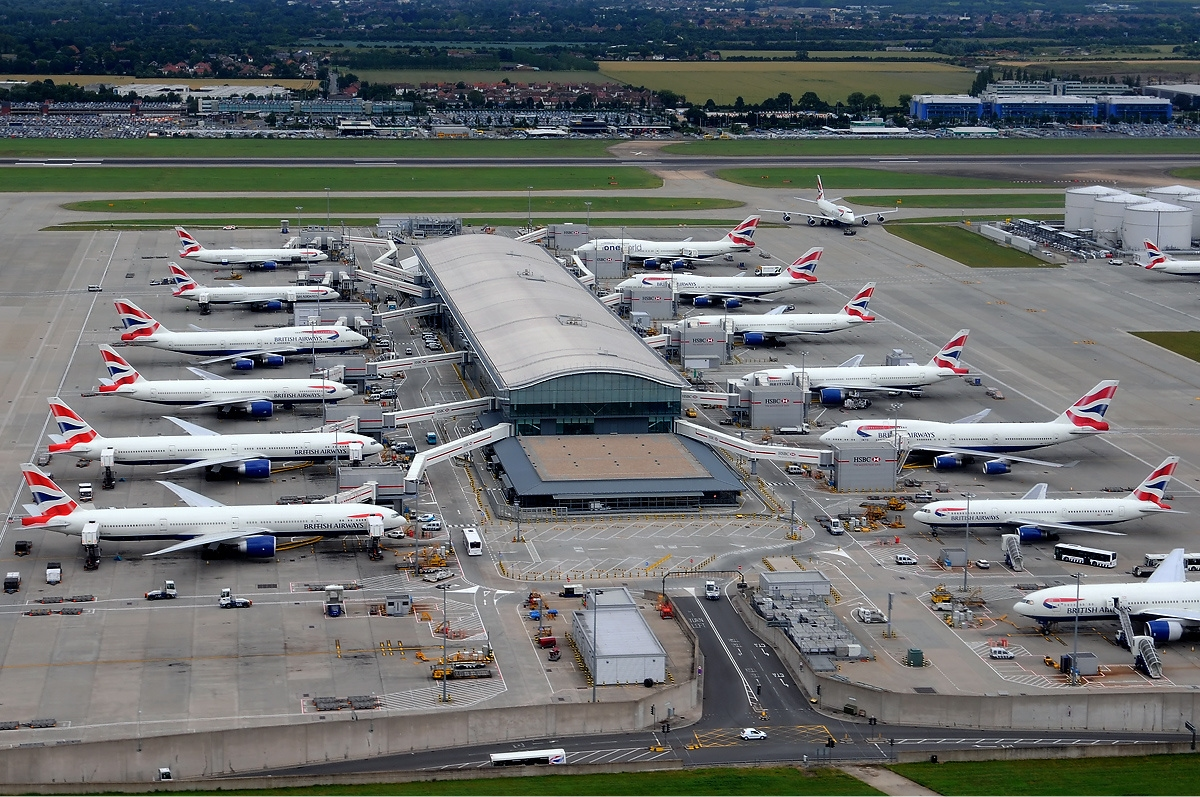
London has the busiest city airport system in the world, with Heathrow being one of the world's busiest airports by passenger traffic.

There are 471 airports and airfields in the UK. There are also 11 heliports. Heathrow Airport is the largest airport by traffic volume in the country and is owned by Heathrow Airport Holdings. Gatwick Airport is the second largest airport and is owned by Global Infrastructure Partners. The third largest is Manchester Airport, which is run by Manchester Airport Group, which also owns various other airports.

Other major airports include Stansted Airport in Essex and Luton Airport in Bedfordshire, both about 30 miles (48 km) north of London, Birmingham Airport, Newcastle Airport, Liverpool Airport, and Bristol Airport.

Outside England, Cardiff, Edinburgh and Belfast, are the busiest airports serving Wales, Scotland and Northern Ireland respectively.

The largest airline in the United Kingdom by passenger traffic is easyJet, whereas British Airways is largest by fleet size and international destinations. Others include Jet2, TUI Airways and Virgin Atlantic.

== Rail transport ==
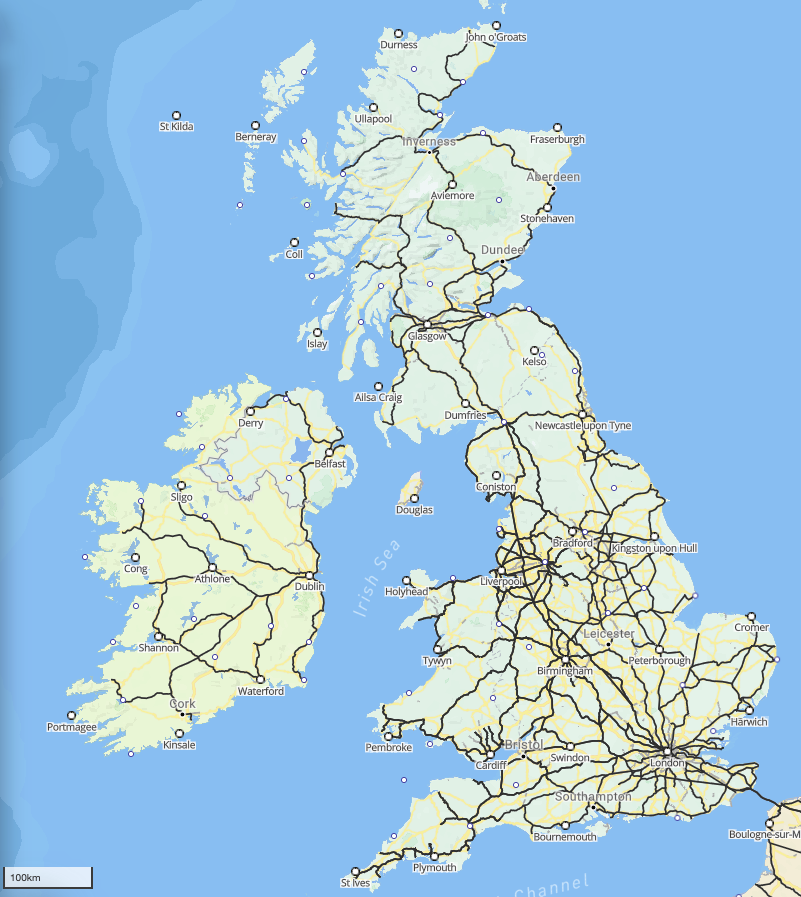
United Kingdom and Ireland railway network

The rail network in the United Kingdom consists of two independent parts, that of Northern Ireland and that of Great Britain. Since 1994, the latter has been connected to mainland Europe via the Channel Tunnel. The network of Northern Ireland is connected to that of the Republic of Ireland. The National Rail network of 10,072 miles (16,209 km) in Great Britain and 189 route miles (303 route km) in Northern Ireland carries 1.7 billion passengers and 110 million tonnes of freight annually.

Urban rail networks are also well developed in London and several other cities. There were once over 30,000 miles (48,000 km) of rail network in the UK. The UK was ranked eighth among national European rail systems in the 2017 European Railway Performance Index assessing intensity of use, quality of service and safety.

=== Great Britain ===
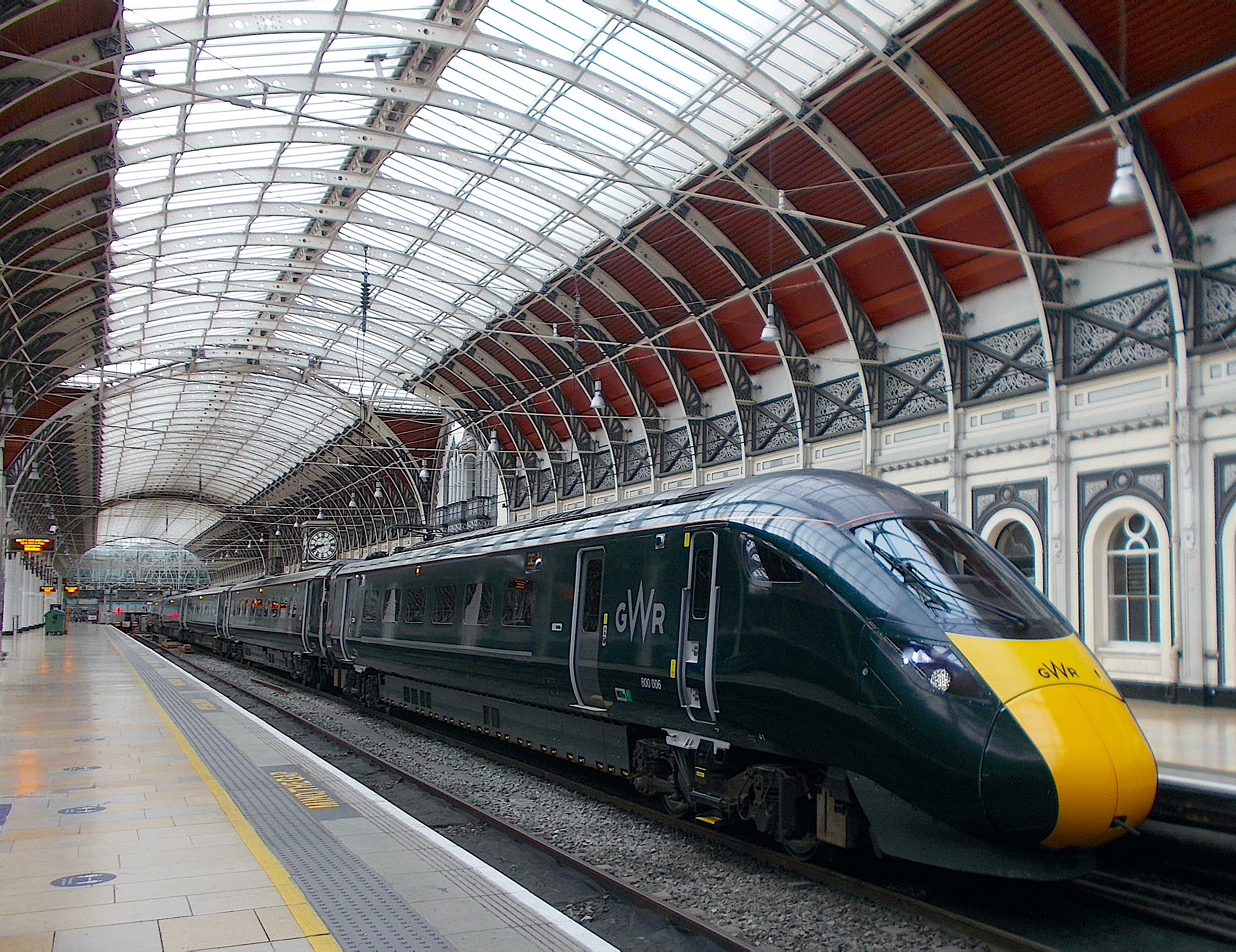
Great Western Railway Hitachi class at London Paddington Station

The rail network in Great Britain is the oldest such network in the world. The system consists of five high-speed main lines (the West Coast, East Coast, Midland, Great Western and Great Eastern), which radiate from London and other major cities to the rest of the country, augmented by regional rail lines and dense commuter networks within cities and other high-speed lines. High Speed 1 is operationally separate from the rest of the network, and is built to the same standard as the TGV system in France.

The world's first passenger railway running on steam was the Stockton and Darlington Railway, opened on 27 September 1825. Just under five years later the world's first intercity railway was the Liverpool and Manchester Railway, designed by George Stephenson and opened by the Prime Minister, the Duke of Wellington on 15 September 1830. The network grew rapidly as a patchwork of literally hundreds of separate companies during the Victorian era, which eventually was consolidated into just four by 1922, as the boom in railways ended and they began to lose money.

Eventually, the entire system came under state control in 1948, under the British Transport Commission's Railway Executive. After 1962 it came under the control of the British Railways Board; then British Railways (later British Rail), and the network was reduced to less than half of its original size by the infamous Beeching cuts of the 1960s when many unprofitable branch lines were closed. Several stations and lines have since been reopened in England and Wales.

In 1994 and 1995, British Rail was split into infrastructure, maintenance, rolling stock, passenger and freight companies, which were privatised from 1996 to 1997. The privatisation has delivered very mixed results, with healthy passenger growth, mass refurbishment of infrastructure, investment in new rolling stock, and safety improvements being offset by concerns over network capacity and the overall cost to the taxpayer, which has increased due to growth in passenger numbers. While the price of anytime and off-peak tickets has increased, the price of Advance tickets has dramatically decreased in real terms: the average Advance ticket in 1995 cost £9.14 (in 2014 prices) compared to £5.17 in 2014.

In Great Britain, the infrastructure (track, stations, depots and signalling chiefly) is owned and maintained by Network Rail, a body of the Department for Transport. Passenger services are operated by mostly public train-operating companies (TOCs), with private franchises awarded by the Department for Transport (in England), Transport Scotland, and Transport for Wales. Examples include Avanti West Coast, Great Western Railway and East Midlands Railway. Some other passenger TOCs make use of open-access contracts or concessionary contracts for their operations, such as Hull Trains or Merseyrail, respectively. Freight trains are operated by freight operating companies, such as DB Cargo UK, which are commercial operations unsupported by the government. Most train operating companies do not own the locomotives and coaches that they use to operate passenger services. Instead, they are required to lease these from the three rolling stock companies (ROSCOs), with train maintenance carried out by companies such as Bombardier and Alstom.

Rail passenger revenue in 2018/19 increased in real terms year-on-year. In 2018/19, there was £18.1bn of public expenditure on railways, an increase of 12%. There were 1.8 billion rail passenger journeys in England. Light rail and tram travel also continued to grow, to the highest level (0.3 million journeys) since comparable records began in 1983.

In Great Britain there are 10,274 miles (16,534 km) of 1,435 mm (4 ft 8 1/2 in) gauge track, reduced from a historic peak of over 30,000 miles (48,000 km). Of this, 3,062 miles (4,928 km) is electrified and 7,823 miles (12,590 km) is double or multiple tracks. The maximum scheduled speed on the regular network has historically been around 125 miles per hour (201 km/h) on the InterCity lines. On High Speed 1, trains are now able to reach the speeds of French TGVs. High Speed 2, under construction, is a wide high-speed line connecting London with Birmingham Curzon Street. The Network North programme consists of hundreds of transport projects mostly in Northern England and Midlands, including new high-speed lines linking up major cities and railway improvements. To cope with increasing passenger numbers, there is a large ongoing programme of upgrades to the network, including Thameslink, Crossrail, electrification of lines, in-cab signalling, new inter-city trains and high-speed lines. Great British Railways is a planned state-owned public body that will oversee rail transport in Great Britain. The Office of Rail and Road is responsible for the economic and safety regulation of the UK's railways. The British Transport Police are the special police force responsible for policing the railways in England, Wales and Scotland.

=== Northern Ireland ===
In Northern Ireland, Northern Ireland Railways (NIR) both owns the infrastructure and operates passenger rail services. The Northern Ireland rail network is one of the few networks in Europe that carry no freight. It is publicly owned. NIR was united in 1996 with Northern Ireland's two publicly owned bus operators – Ulsterbus, Foyle Metro and Metro (formally Citybus) – under the brand Translink. In Northern Ireland there is 212 miles (341 km) of track at 1,600 mm (5 ft 3 in) gauge. 118 miles (190 km) of it is double track.

=== International rail services ===
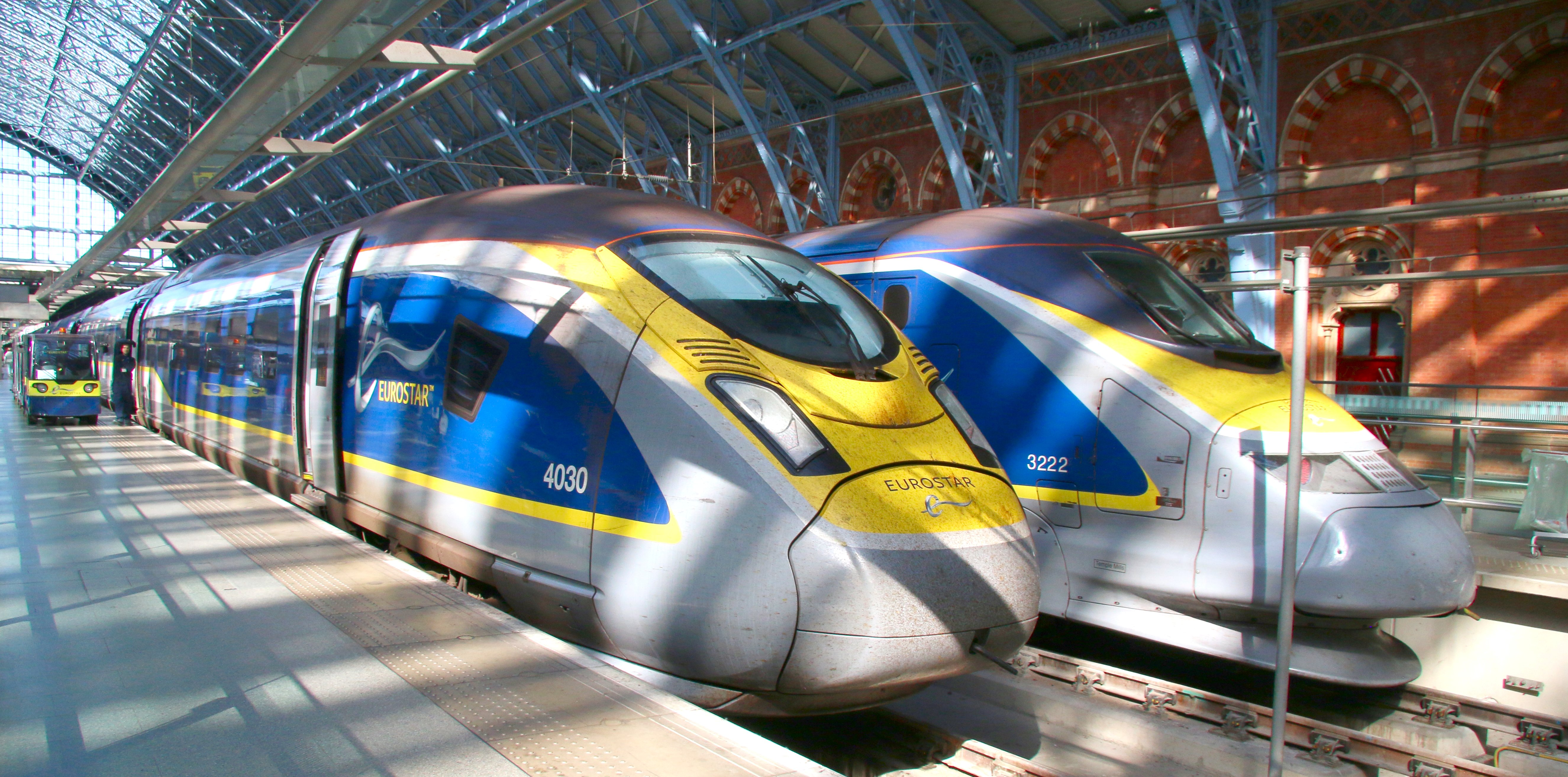
A Eurostar service at St Pancras station

Eurostar operates trains via the Channel Tunnel to France, Belgium and The Netherlands. The Enterprise which is a joint venture Northern Ireland Railways and Iarnród Éireann operates the cross border link between Northern Ireland and the Republic of Ireland.

=== Rapid transit ===
Rapid transit, tram, and local commuter rail systems in the United Kingdom

Three cities in the United Kingdom have rapid transit systems. The most well known is the London Underground (commonly known as the Tube), the oldest rapid transit system in the world which opened 1863.

Another system also in London is the separate Docklands Light Railway. Although this is more of an elevated light metro system due to its lower passenger capacities; further, it is integrated with the Underground in many ways. Outside London, there is the Glasgow Subway which is the third oldest rapid transit system in the world. One other system, the Tyne & Wear Metro (opened 1980), serves Newcastle, Gateshead, Sunderland, North Tyneside and South Tyneside, and has many similarities to a rapid transit system including underground stations, but is sometimes considered to be light rail. The Liverpool Overhead Railway (opened 1893) was one of the first metros in the world but was dismantled 1956–1958 after years of neglect because nobody was willing or able to provide the funds for maintenance and repairs.

=== Urban rail ===
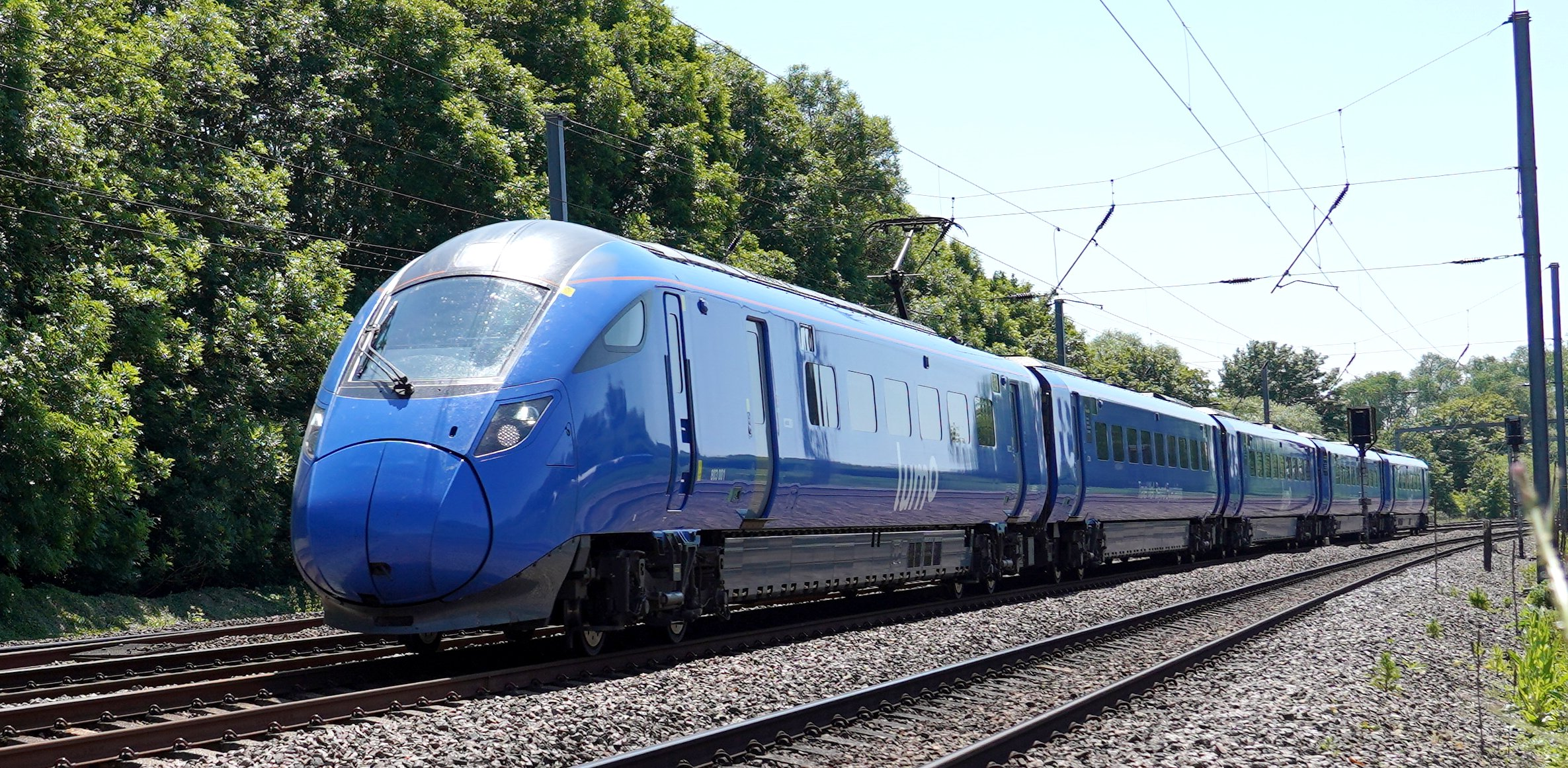
Lumo high-speed trains provide services from Northern England to Scotland and London.

Urban commuter rail networks are focused on many of the country's major cities:

- Belfast – Belfast Suburban Rail
- Birmingham – West Midlands Railway
- Bristol – Great Western Railway
- Cardiff – Valley Lines
- Edinburgh – ScotRail
- Exeter – Great Western Railway
- Glasgow – ScotRail
- Leeds – MetroTrain
- Liverpool – Merseyrail
- London – London Underground, London Overground, and Elizabeth line
- Manchester – Northern and TransPennine Express
- Newcastle – Tyne & Wear Metro

They consist of several railway lines connecting city centre stations of major cities to suburbs and surrounding towns. Train services and ticketing are fully integrated with the national rail network and are not considered separate. In London, a route for Crossrail 2 has been safeguarded.

=== Trams and light rail ===
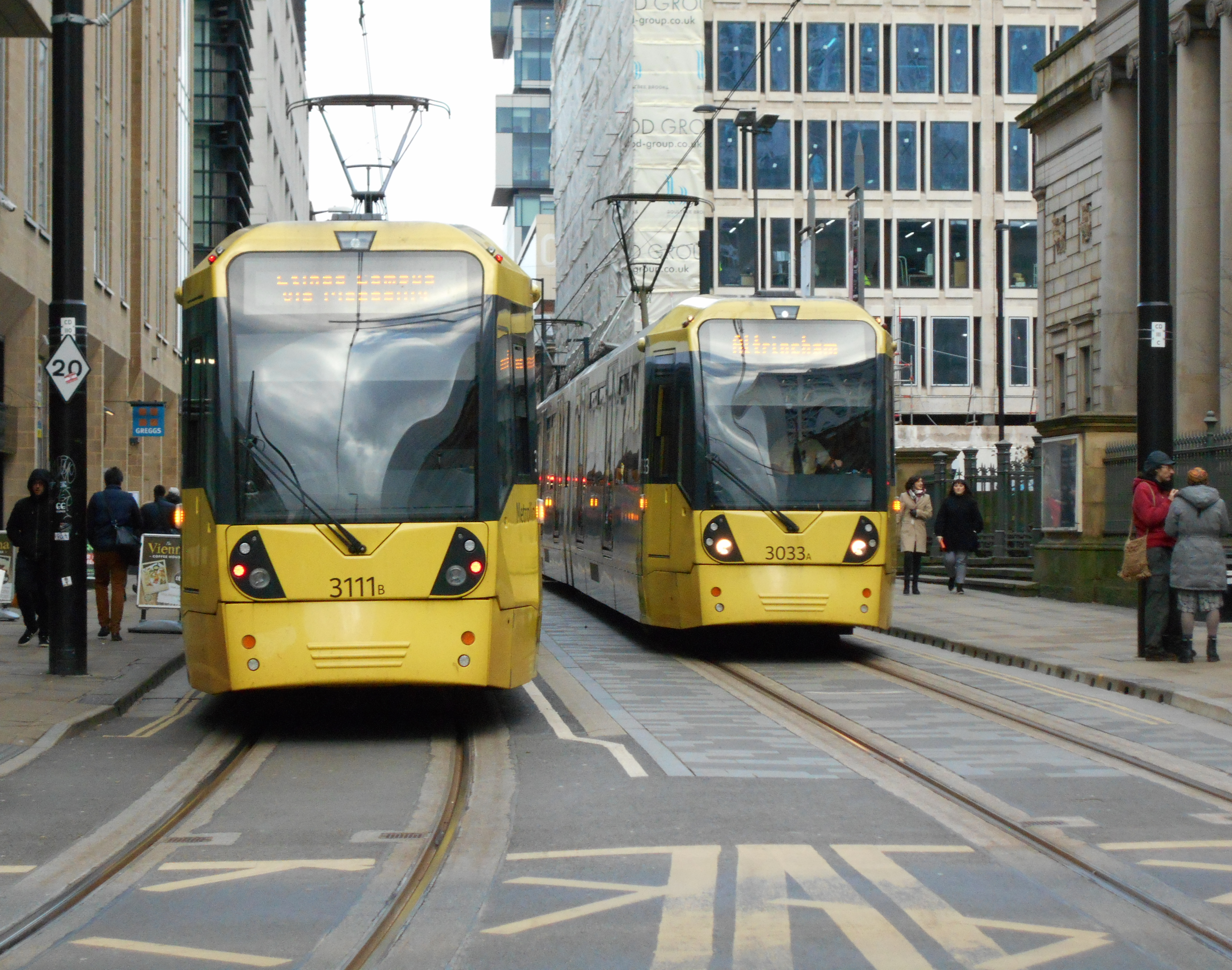
Manchester Metrolink is the largest light rail system in the UK and is integrated into the city's Bee Network.

Tram systems were popular in the United Kingdom in the late 19th and early 20th century. However, with the rise of the car they began to be widely dismantled in the 1950s. By 1962 only the Blackpool tramway and the Glasgow Corporation Tramways remained; the final Glasgow service was withdrawn on 4 September 1962. Recent years have seen a revival the United Kingdom, as in other countries, of trams together with light rail systems.

Since the 1990s, a second generation of tram networks have been built and have started operating in Manchester in 1992, Sheffield in 1994, the West Midlands in 1999, South London in 2000, Nottingham in 2004 and Edinburgh in 2014, whilst the original trams in Blackpool were upgraded to second generation vehicles in 2012.

Four light rapid transit lines are opening in the Welsh Capital of Cardiff as part of the current South Wales Metro plan Phase 1 in 2023, which will reach as far out of the capital as Hirwaun, a town 31 miles (50 km) from Cardiff Bay, as well as three new lines planned to open by 2026.

Tram/Light Rail systems in the United Kingdom
Primary location	System	Date opened	Line(s)	Stations	System length	Passenger Revenue	Passengers (2024/25)	Change from previous year
Blackpool	Blackpool Tramway	1885	1	42	11.5 miles (18.5 km)	£8.4M	4.4M	6.4%
Newcastle / Tyne & Wear	Tyne & Wear Metro	1980	2	60	48.5 miles (78.1 km)	£68.5M	32.2M	4.9%
London (East)	Docklands Light Railway	1987	3	45	23.6 miles (38.0 km)	£149.9M	97.8M	1.1%
Greater Manchester	Manchester Metrolink	1992	8	99	64 miles (103 km)	£84.3M	46.0M	9.5%
Sheffield	South Yorkshire Supertram	1994	4	51	21.1 miles (34.0 km)	£17.6M	9.1M	4.6%
West Midlands (Birmingham and Wolverhampton)	West Midlands Metro	1999	1	35	14.9 miles (24.0 km)	£14M	8.8M	6.0%
London (South)	Tramlink	2000	4	39	17.4 miles (28.0 km)	£19.6M	17.2M	14.0%
Nottingham	Nottingham Express Transit	2004	2	50	19.9 miles (32.0 km)	£26.7M	15.7M	1.3%
Edinburgh	Edinburgh Trams	2014	1	23	11.5 miles (18.5 km)	N/A	12.2M	N/A

== Road transport ==
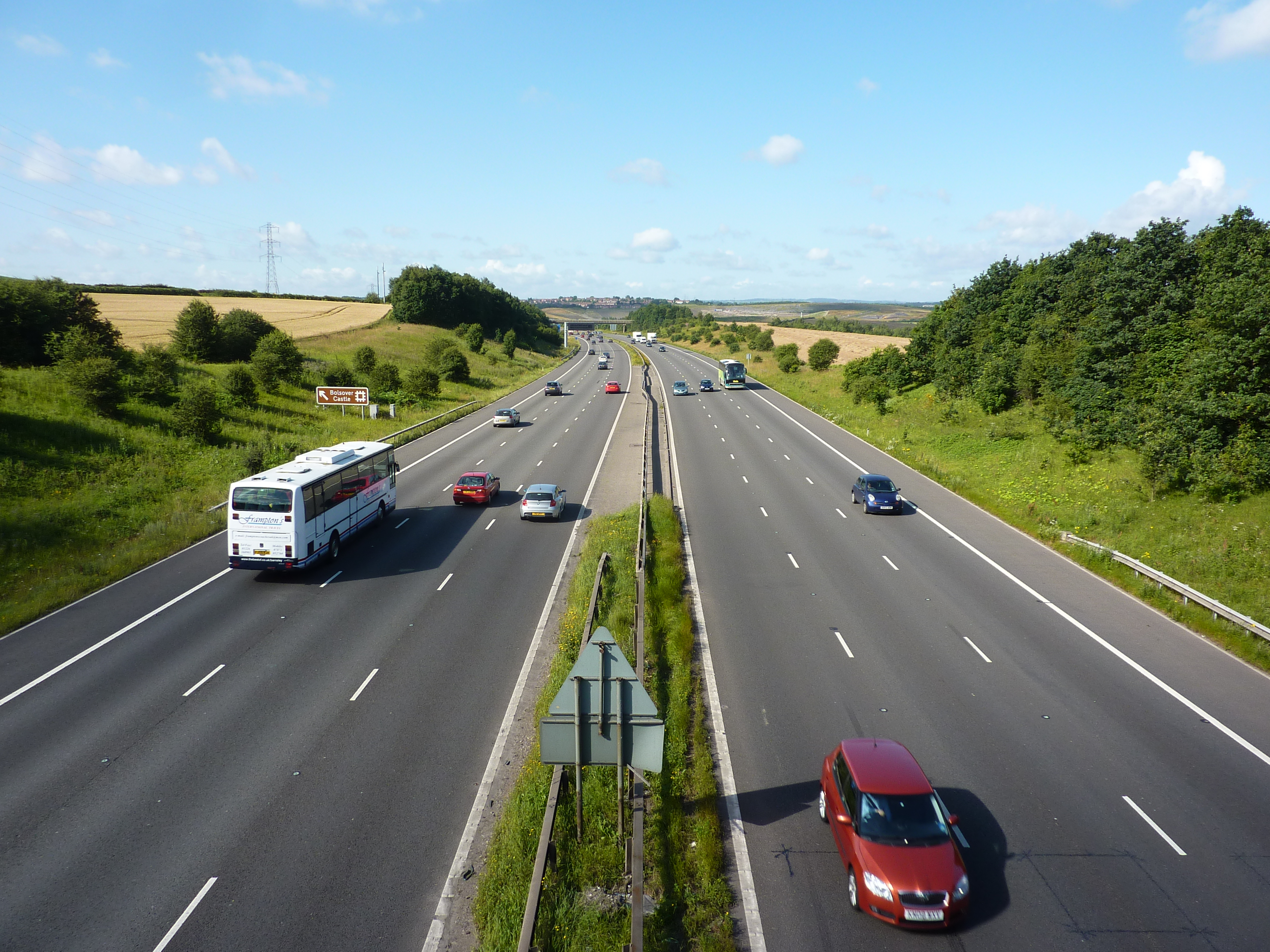
M1 motorway in Yorkshire is an example of an urban motorway.

The road network in Great Britain, in 2006, consisted of 7,596 miles (12,225 km) of trunk roads (including 2,176 miles (3,502 km) of motorway), 23,658 miles (38,074 km) of principal roads (including 34 miles (55 km) of motorway), 71,244 miles (114,656 km) of "B" and "C" roads, and 145,017 miles (233,382 km) of unclassified roads (mainly local streets and access roads) – totalling 247,523 miles (398,350 km).

Road is the most popular method of transport in the United Kingdom, carrying over 90% of motorised passenger travel and 65% of domestic freight. The major motorways and trunk roads, many of which are dual carriageway, form the trunk network which links all cities and major towns. These carry about one third of the nation's traffic, and occupy about 0.16% of its land area.

The motorway system, which was constructed from the 1950s onwards. National Highways (a UK government-owned company) is responsible for maintaining motorways and trunk roads in England. Other English roads are maintained by local authorities. In Scotland and Wales roads are the responsibility of Transport Scotland, an executive agency of the Scottish Government, and the North and Mid Wales Trunk Road Agent and South Wales Trunk Road Agent on behalf of the Welsh Government respectively. Northern Ireland's roads are overseen by the Department for Infrastructure Roads (DfI Roads). In London, Transport for London is responsible for all trunk roads and other major roads, which are part of the Transport for London Road Network. Toll roads are rare in the United Kingdom, though there are a number of toll bridges. Road traffic congestion has been identified as a key concern for the future prosperity of the United Kingdom, and policies and measures are being investigated and developed by the government to reduce congestion. In 2003, the United Kingdom's first toll motorway, the M6 Toll, opened in the West Midlands area to relieve the congested M6 motorway. Rod Eddington, in his 2006 report Transport's role in sustaining the UK's productivity and competitiveness, recommended that the congestion problem should be tackled with a "sophisticated policy mix" of congestion-targeted road pricing and improving the capacity and performance of the transport network through infrastructure investment and better use of the existing network. Congestion charging systems do operate in the cities of London and Durham and on the Dartford Crossing.

Driving is on the left. The usual maximum speed limit for cars and motorcycles is 70 mph (110 km/h) on motorways and dual carriageways. On 29 April 2015, the UK Supreme Court ruled that the government must take immediate action to cut air pollution, following a case brought by environmental lawyers at ClientEarth.

=== Cycle infrastructure ===
The National Cycle Network, created by the charity Sustrans, is the UK's major network of signed routes for cycling. It uses dedicated bike paths as well as roads with minimal traffic, and covers 14,000 miles (23,000 km), passing within one mile (1.6 km) of half of all homes. Other cycling routes such as The National Byway, the Sea to Sea Cycle Route and local cycleways can be found across the country.

Segregated cycle paths are being installed in some cities in the UK such as London, Glasgow, Manchester, Bristol, Cardiff. In London, Transport for London has installed Cycleways.

== Road passenger transport ==
=== Buses ===
Bus transport is widespread and local bus services cover the whole country. Since deregulation the majority (80% by the late 1990s) of these local bus companies have been taken over by one of the "Big Five" private transport companies: Arriva, FirstGroup, Go-Ahead Group, Mobico Group and Stagecoach Group. In Northern Ireland, coach, bus (and rail) services remain state-owned and are provided by Translink. Cities and regions such as Manchester and Nottingham have publicity owned bus networks and other transport.

=== Coaches ===
Coaches provide long-distance links throughout the UK: in England and Wales the majority of coach services are provided by National Express. Flixbus operates a no-frills coach services in competition with National Express. BlaBlaBus also operate to France and the Low Countries from London.

== Road freight transport ==
In 2014, there were around 285,000 HGV drivers in the UK and in 2013 the trucking industry moved 1.6 billion tonnes of goods, generating £22.9 billion in revenue.

== Water transport ==
Due to the United Kingdom's island location, before the Channel Tunnel the only way to enter or leave the country (apart from air travel) was on water, except at the border between Northern Ireland and the Republic of Ireland.

=== Ports and harbours ===
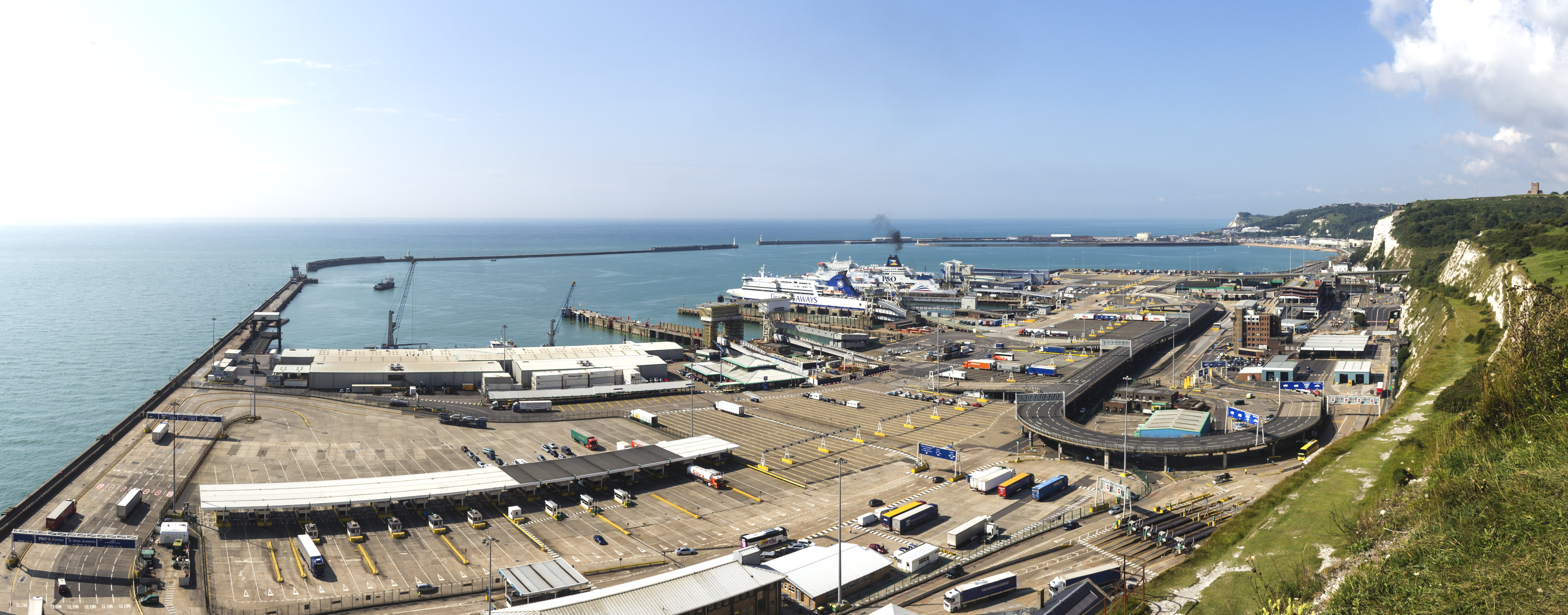
The Port of Dover is one of the world's busiest maritime passenger ports, with 11.7 million passengers, 2.6 million lorries, 2.2 million cars and motorcycles and 80,000 coaches passing through it yearly.

About 95% of freight enters the United Kingdom by sea (75% by value). UK ports handled 486 million tons of goods in 2019. As of 2022, the five major ports that handled the most freight traffic were:

- Port of London, on the River Thames.
- Grimsby & Immingham on the east coast
- Milford Haven, in south-west Wales
- Port of Liverpool on the west coast
- Port of Southampton, on the south coast

There are many other ports and harbours around the United Kingdom, including:

Aberdeen, Barrow, Barry, Belfast, Boston, Bristol, Cairnryan, Cardiff, Dover, Edinburgh/Leith, Falmouth, Felixstowe, Fishguard, Glasgow, Gloucester, Grangemouth, Grimsby, Harwich, Heysham, Holyhead, Hull, Kirkwall, Larne, Liverpool, Londonderry, Manchester, Oban, Pembroke Dock, Peterhead, Plymouth, Poole, Port Talbot, Portishead, Portsmouth, Scapa Flow, Stornoway, Stranraer, Sullom Voe, Swansea, Tees (Middlesbrough), Tyne (Newcastle).

=== Merchant marine ===
For long periods of recent history, Britain had the largest registered merchant fleet in the world, but it has slipped down the rankings partly due to the use of flags of convenience. There are 429 ships of 1,000 gross tonnage (GT) or over, making a total of 9,181,284 GT (9,566,275 tonnes deadweight (DWT)). These are split into the following types: bulk carrier 18, cargo ship 55, chemical tanker 48, container ship 134, liquefied gas 11, passenger ship 12, passenger/cargo ship 64, petroleum tanker 40, refrigerated cargo ship 19, roll-on/roll-off 25, vehicle carrier 3.

=== Ferries ===
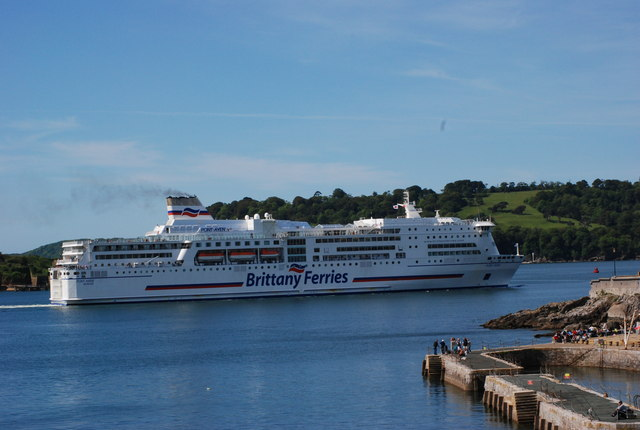
Ferry at Millbay Docks in Plymouth

Ferries, both passenger only and passengers and vehicles, operate within the United Kingdom across rivers and stretches of water. In east London the Woolwich Ferry links the North and South Circular Roads. Gosport and Portsmouth are linked by the Gosport Ferry; Southampton and Isle of Wight are linked by ferry and fast Catamaran ferries; North Shields and South Shields on Tyneside are linked by the Shields Ferry; and the Mersey has the Mersey Ferry.

In Scotland, Caledonian MacBrayne provides passenger and roll-on/roll-off ferry services in the Firth of Clyde, to various islands of the Inner and Outer Hebrides from Oban and other ports. Orkney Ferries provides services within the Orkney Isles; and NorthLink Ferries provides services from the Scottish mainland to Orkney and Shetland, mainly from Aberdeen although other ports are also used. Ferries operate to Northern Ireland from Stranraer and Cairnryan to Larne and Belfast.

Holyhead, Pembroke Dock and Fishguard are the principal ports for ferries between Wales and Ireland. Heysham and Liverpool/Birkenhead have ferry services to the Isle of Man.

Passenger ferries operate internationally to nearby countries such as France, the Republic of Ireland, Belgium, the Netherlands, and Spain. Ferries usually originate from one of the following:

- Dover with services to Calais operated by DFDS Seaways, Irish Ferries and P&O Ferries.
- Portsmouth International Port is the main hub for longer services on the Western Channel to Cherbourg, Ouistreham, Le Havre and St Malo in France, and Santander and Bilbao in Spain. These services are operated by the French company Brittany Ferries. Services to the Channel Islands are operated by both Brittany Ferries and DFDS Seaways.
- Services from Plymouth operate to Santander (Spain) and Roscoff (France) with Brittany Ferries.
- Services from Poole operate to the Channel Islands with Brittany Ferries and DFDS Seaways, and to Cherbourg with Brittany Ferries.
- Holyhead is the principal ferry port for services to Ireland, operated by Irish Ferries and Stena Line with some services originating from Pembroke.
- Hull and Harwich are the main hubs for services to the Netherlands.

More services from Ramsgate, Newhaven, Southampton, and Lymington operate to France, Belgium and the Isle of Wight.

Waterbuses operate on rivers in some of the country's largest cities such as London (London River Services and Thames Clippers), Cardiff (Cardiff Waterbus) and Bristol (Bristol Ferry Boat).

=== Other shipping ===
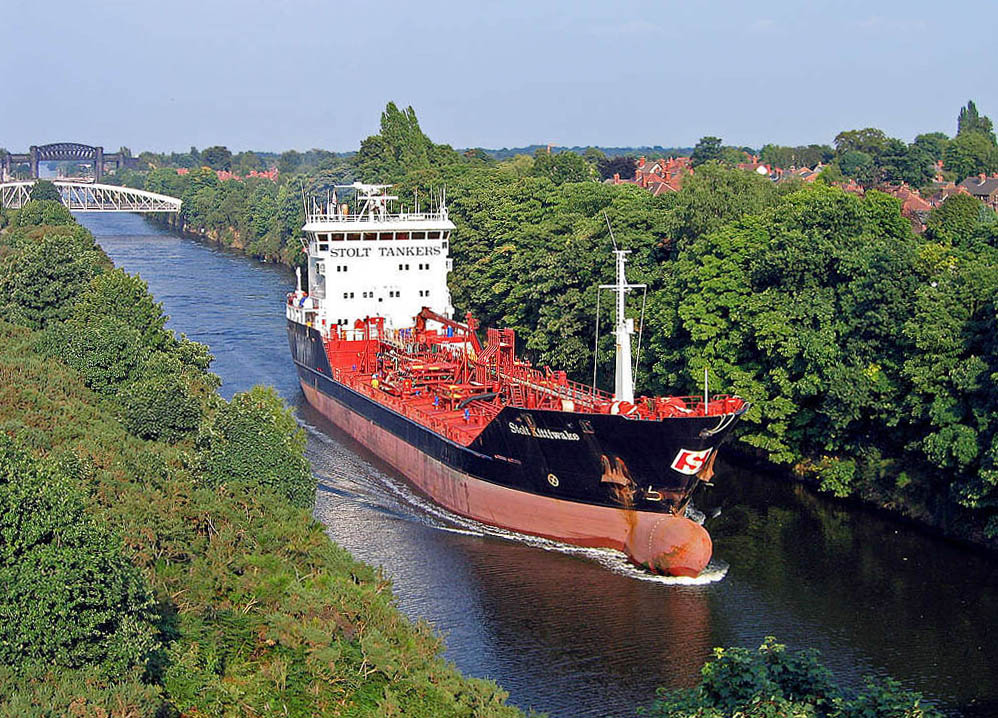
The Manchester Ship Canal can accommodate ships with a length of up to 600 feet (183 m).

Cruise ships depart from the United Kingdom for destinations worldwide, many heading for ports around the Mediterranean and Caribbean.The Cunard Line still offer a scheduled transatlantic service between Southampton and New York City with RMS Queen Mary 2. The Solent is a world centre for yachting and home to largest number of private yachts in the world.

=== Inland waterways ===
Major canal building began in the United Kingdom after the onset of the Industrial Revolution in the 18th century. A large canal network was built and it became the primary method of transporting goods throughout the country; however, by the 1830s with the development of the railways, the canal network began to go into decline. There are currently 1,988 miles (3,199 km) of waterways in the United Kingdom and the primary use is recreational. 385 miles (620 km) is used for commerce and leisure.

== Education and professional development ==
The United Kingdom also has a well-developed network of organisations offering education and professional development in the transport and logistics sectors. A number of universities offer degree programmes in transport, usually covering transport planning, engineering of transport infrastructure, and management of transport and logistics services. The Institute for Transport Studies at the University of Leeds is one such organisation.

Pupils in England and Wales can study transport and logistics in apprenticeship studies at further education and sixth form colleges. Professional development for those working in the transport and logistics sectors is provided by a number of Professional Institutes representing specific sectors. These include:

- Chartered Institute of Logistics and Transport (CILT(UK))
- Chartered Institution of Highways and Transportation (CIHT)
- Chartered Institution of Railway Operators
- Transport Planning Society (TPS)

Through these professional bodies, transport planners and engineers can train for a number of professional qualifications, including:

- Chartered engineer
- Incorporated engineer
- Transport planning professional

== See also ==
- British Royal Train
- British Transport Police
- List of closed railway lines in the United Kingdom
- Rail transport in Great Britain
- Transport in England
- Transport in London
- Transport in Northern Ireland
- Transport in Scotland
- Transport in Wales
