= Trams in England =

Tramway network in England

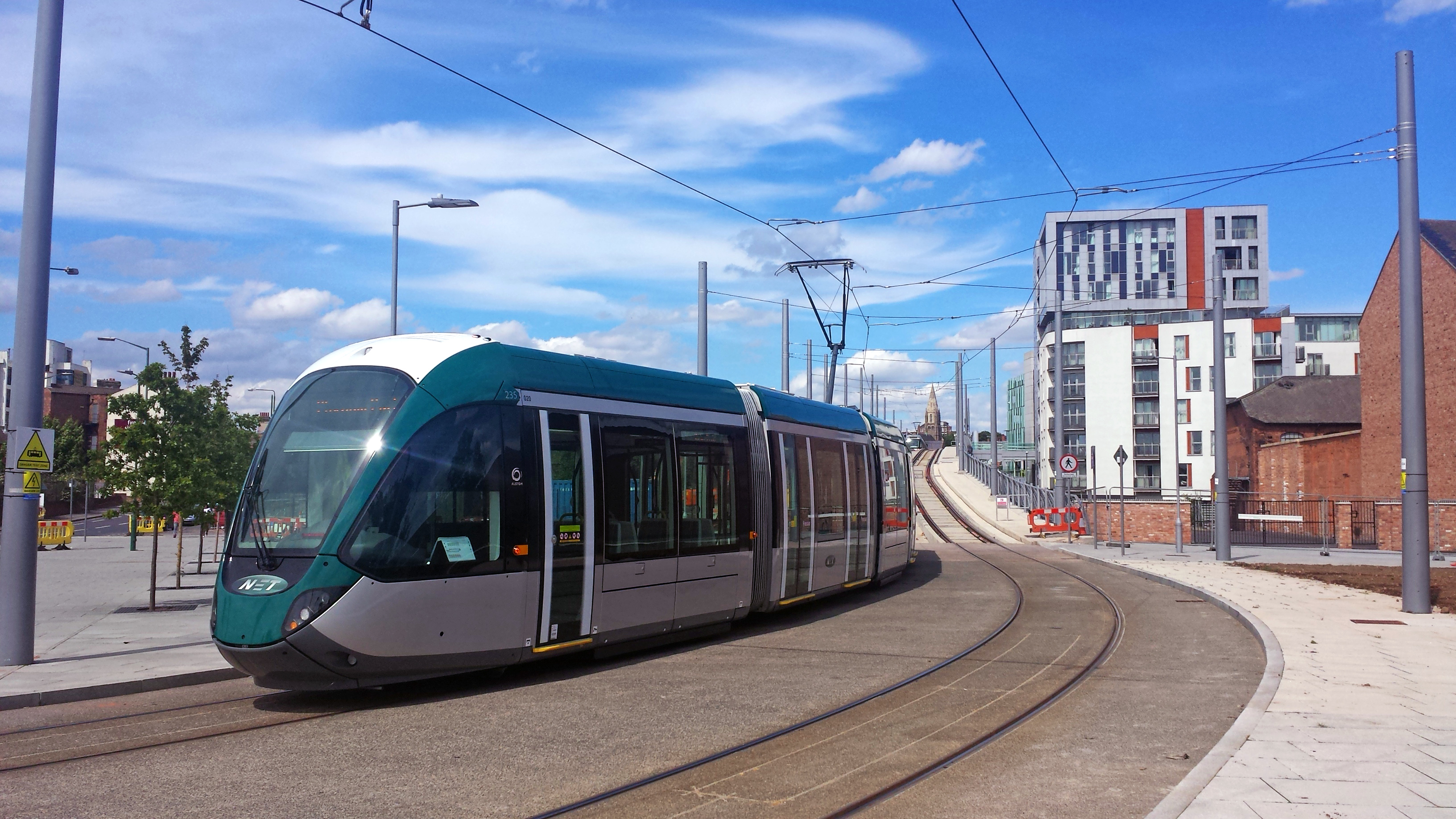
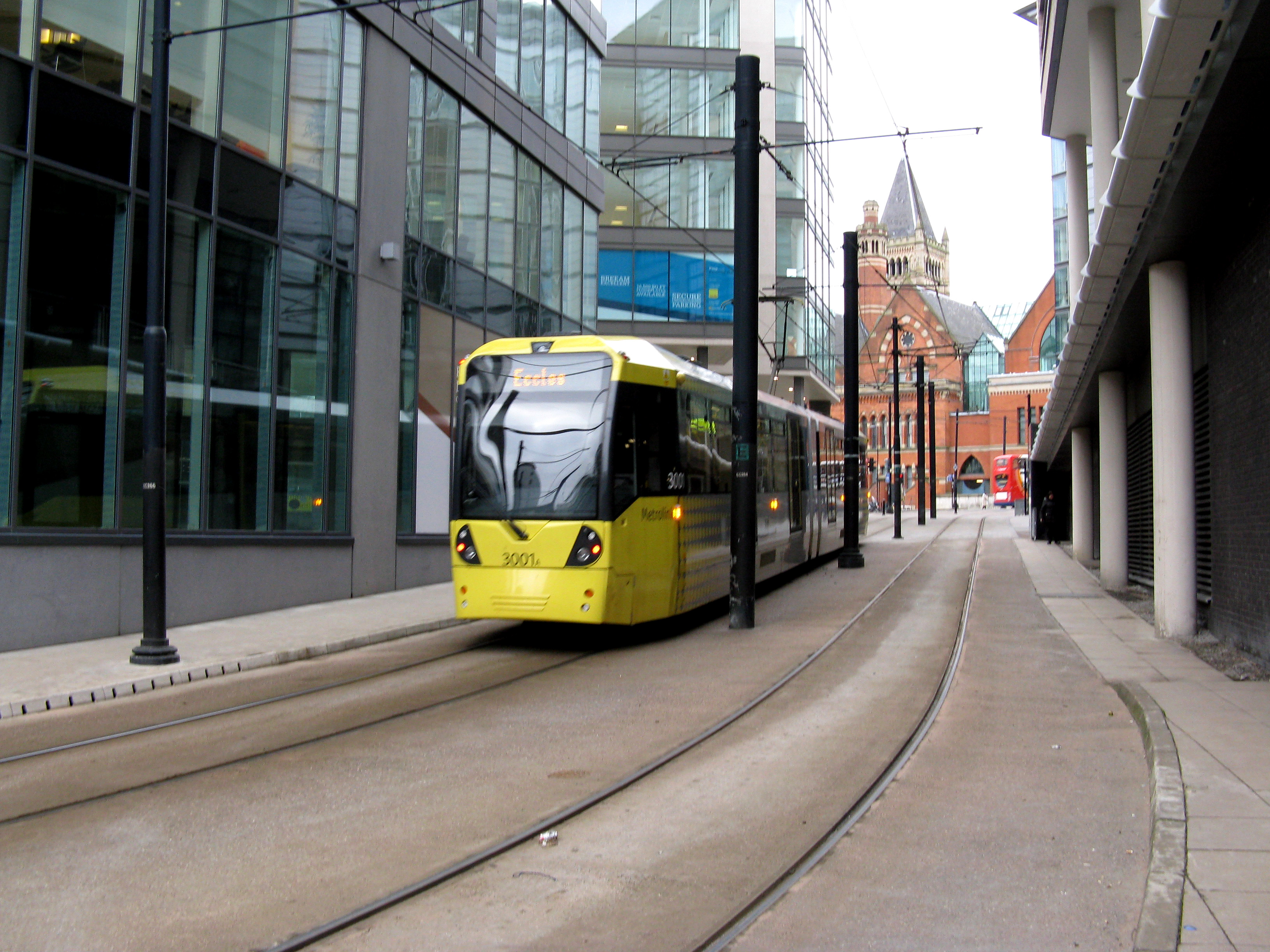
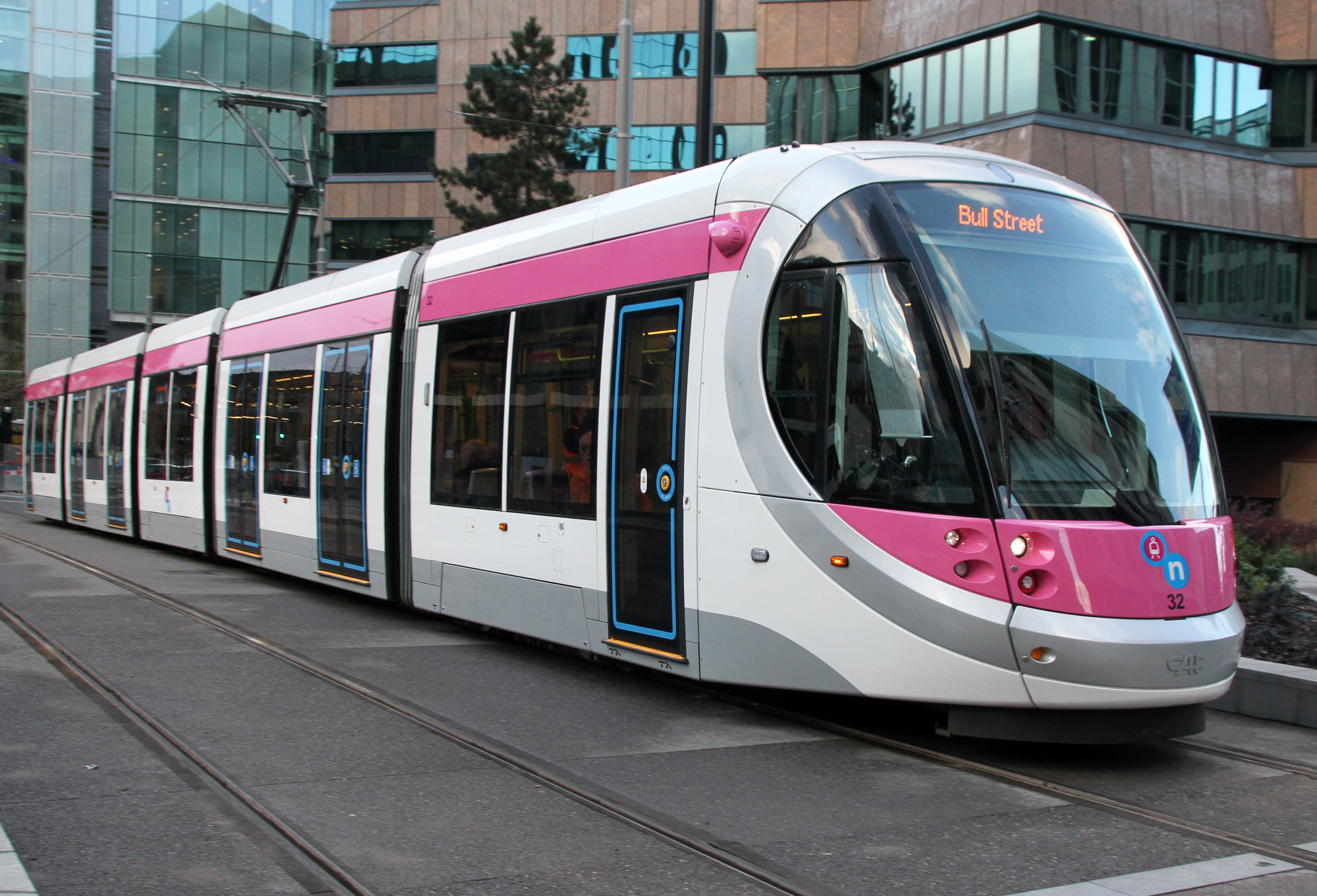
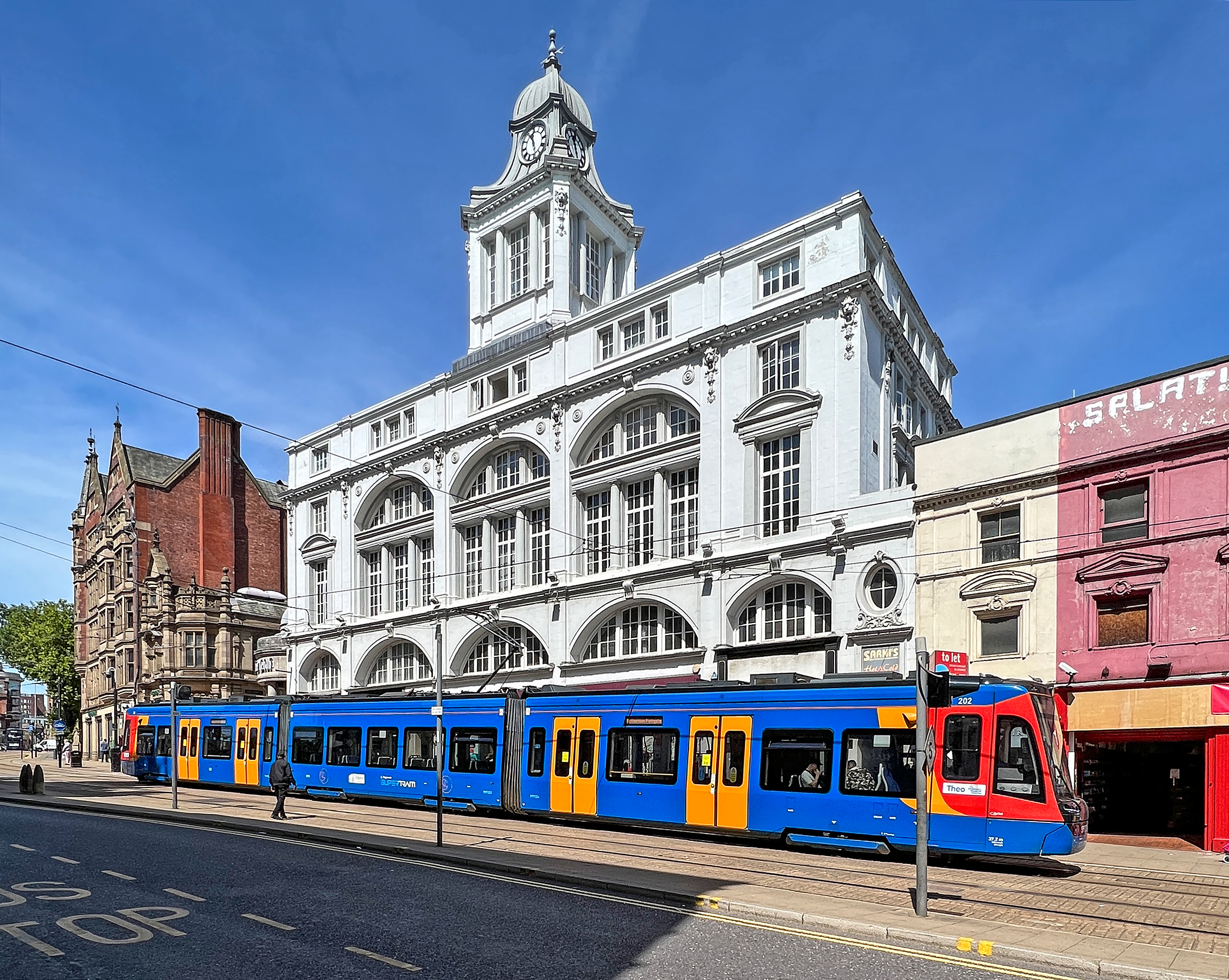
Examples of public tram networks in England.

Trams in England encompass various tram networks integrated into the public transport system of England. Until 1935, there had been a large and comprehensive network of tram systems in towns and cities.

Most of the country's tram systems were replaced by bus services in the 1930s or shortly after the Second World War. England's tram systems were largely dismantled, and by 1963, only Blackpool Transport survived. Since the 1990s, trams and light rail transportation have become increasingly common again, with a second generation of tram and light rail networks operating in cities and regions such as Manchester Metrolink, Nottingham Express Transit, Sheffield Supertram, London Tramlink, and the West Midlands Metro.

== Operating systems ==
Tramlink is a light rail tram system serving the areas in South London. It is owned by London Trams, part of Transport for London. The network consists of 39 stops along 28 km (17 mi) of track, on a mixture of street track shared with other traffic, dedicated track in public roads, and off-street track consisting of new rights-of-way, former railway lines, and one right-of-way where the Tramlink track runs parallel to Network Rail lines.

West Midlands Metro is a light rail tram system in the county of West Midlands. Opened on 30 May 1999, it currently consists of a single route, Line 1, which operates between the cities of Birmingham and Wolverhampton via the towns of Bilston, West Bromwich and Wednesbury, running on a mixture of reopened disused railway lines and on-street running in urban areas. The line originally terminated at Birmingham Snow Hill station, but with extensions opened in 2015 and 2019, now runs into Birmingham City Centre to terminate at Edgbaston. Extensions to Wolverhampton railway station were completed and opened to passengers in 2023. Construction of a new Line 2 & 3 was approved in March 2019 and started in February 2020 for the Commonwealth Games. Following the opening of the extension into the city centre in 2016, usage increased sharply. Figures for 2016/17 showed passenger numbers rose to over six million.

The South Yorkshire Supertram is a light rail tram network, covering Sheffield and Rotherham. The infrastructure is owned by the South Yorkshire Passenger Transport Executive (SYPTE), from 2008, interest had been expressed in hybrid tram train operations, which would be able to use sections of the mainline rail network as well as tramways. The Supertram network now consists of 50 stations across four colour-coded lines, the Blue, Purple, Yellow and Tram-Train (Black) routes, which connect with local and national bus and rail services and six park and ride sites.

Metrolink is owned by the public body Transport for Greater Manchester and integrated in the Bee Network. The network has 99 stops along 103 kilometres (64 mi) of standard-gauge rout making it the most extensive light rail system in England and one of the largest in Europe. Metrolink is operated by a fleet of high-floor Bombardier M5000 light rail vehicles. Each service runs to a 12-minute frequency; stops with more than one service experience combined frequencies of 6 minutes or less. At the busiest times some services operate as 'doubles', with two vehicles coupled together. In 2019/20, 44.3 million passenger journeys were made on the system. The Greater Manchester Combined Authority has proposed numerous further expansions of the network, including the addition of tram train technology to extend Metrolink services onto local heavy-rail lines.

Coventry Very Light Rail is a planned light rail tram system in Coventry. The first line of the system is set to be operational by 2024. Further expansion of the network is intended after this point to cover various commercial, residential, and industrial districts, as well as linking up with other transit hubs. The concept has been developed as a means of delivering a light rail system at a much lower cost and with much reduced construction times than traditional tramways or light rail systems. The system has been engineered for compatibility with the existing West Midlands Metro mass transit network. The vehicles are to be equipped with batteries; when combined with rapid charging systems, the need for overhead line equipment to be installed throughout the route is dispensed with, resulting in reduced installation costs. Being electrically powered, it produces zero emissions and is therefore an environment-friendly means of transportation. The concept for this mass transit system originated from the Warwick Manufacturing Group (WMG), an institution that is closely associated with the University of Warwick.

Location	System	Traction type	Date opened
Blackpool	Blackpool Tramway	Electric	29 September 1885
South London	Tramlink	Electric	10 May 2000
Greater Manchester	Metrolink	Electric	6 April 1992
Nottingham	Nottingham Express Transit	Electric	9 March 2004
Sheffield and Rotherham	South Yorkshire Supertram	Electric	21 March 1994
West Midlands	West Midlands Metro	Electric	30 May 1999

== See also ==
- Light Rail Transit Association
- List of guided busways and BRT systems in the United Kingdom
- List of town tramway systems in the United Kingdom
- List of trolleybus systems in the United Kingdom
- Transport in England
