= Stimson Storm =

Overview
- Production: 2002–07
- Designer: Barry Stimson

Powertrain
- Engine: Suzuki 1157 cc (70.6 cu in)

The Stimson Storm is a three-wheeled motor vehicle designed by Barry Stimson, and offered for sale as a kit car. It was introduced into the UK in 2002 and continued in production until 2007, although only one was built during that time.
