= Chartered Institute of Logistics and Transport =

Professional association

Chartered Institute of Logistics and Transport International
- Company type: Professional Institute
- Industry: Logistics and Transport
- Founded: 1999 (origins from 1919)
- Headquarters: Corby, Northamptonshire, United Kingdom
- Area served: Worldwide
- Key people: Chief Teete OWUSU-NORTEY – International President; Sharon Kindleysides – Secretary General
- Products: Membership Organisation
- Website: CILT International

The Chartered Institute of Logistics and Transport (CILT) is a professional body representing the transport and logistics industries worldwide. It is a membership-based organisation with over 30,000 members in over 40 countries. This international body is sometimes known as CILT International to distinguish it from the national councils, sections and branches.

The principal objective of the CILT is "To promote and encourage the art and science of logistics and transport", which it achieves both through its membership and professional qualifications. It provides extensive opportunities for training and learning opportunities with a range of internationally recognised qualifications and courses.

== History ==
The Institute of Transport (IoT) was founded in London on 3 November 1919 and granted a royal charter in 1926 to become the Chartered Institute of Transport (CIT).

In 1999 the Chartered Institute of Transport and the Institute of Logistics (IoL) combined activities to become the Institute of Logistics and Transport (IOLT). In 2004 "chartered" was adopted into the title, which now reads Chartered Institute of Logistics and Transport.

== Membership and Chartered membership ==
The Institute of Logistics and Transport offers six grades of membership: Associate, Student, Affiliate, Member (MILT), Chartered Member (CMILT) and Chartered Fellow (FCILT).

Chartered Membership is the institute's senior professional grade of membership. Only professional bodies that have been granted the royal charter can award chartered membership, such as: Chemical, Electrical, Civil, and Mechanical Engineers; Certified, Chartered, Public Finance Accountants; and Surveyors. CILT's Chartership is of equivalent standing to these, and applying for it requires demonstrating achievement of educational attainment, professional competence and (CPD) to a panel. A Chartered Member is awarded the post-nominal letters CMILT.

Chartered Members who have attained important positions or have had distinguished careers can be nominated for Fellowship, with the post-nominal letters FCILT.

== Teaching and qualifications ==
The institute has a programme of teaching and qualifications, which can lead to a diploma or a degree in transport or logistics. In addition, they certify academic degrees from other institutions, such as the Institute for Transport Studies, University of Leeds and The Department of Logistics and Maritime Studies, The Hong Kong Polytechnic University, providing their graduates with exemption from examinations for proceeding to chartered status.

== Representation ==
The Chartered Institute of Logistics and Transport is represented by national councils and branches in the following continents and countries.

Africa

- Egypt
- Ethiopia
- Ghana
- Malawi
- Mauritius
- Morocco
- Nigeria
- South Africa
- Tanzania
- Uganda
- Zambia
- Zimbabwe

Americas

- North America

Australasia

- Australia
- New Zealand

East Asia

- China
- Hong Kong
- Macao
- Taiwan

South Asia

- Bangladesh
- India
- Pakistan
- Sri Lanka

South East Asia

- Indonesia
- Malaysia
- Philippines
- Singapore

Europe & Middle East

- Ireland
- Malta
- Oman
- Poland
- UAE
- Bahrain
- Ukraine
- United Kingdom

== See also ==
- Chartered Institute of Logistics and Transport in the UK – the National Council for the United Kingdom
