= Institute for Transport Studies, University of Leeds =

Coordinates: 53.808°N 1.553°W

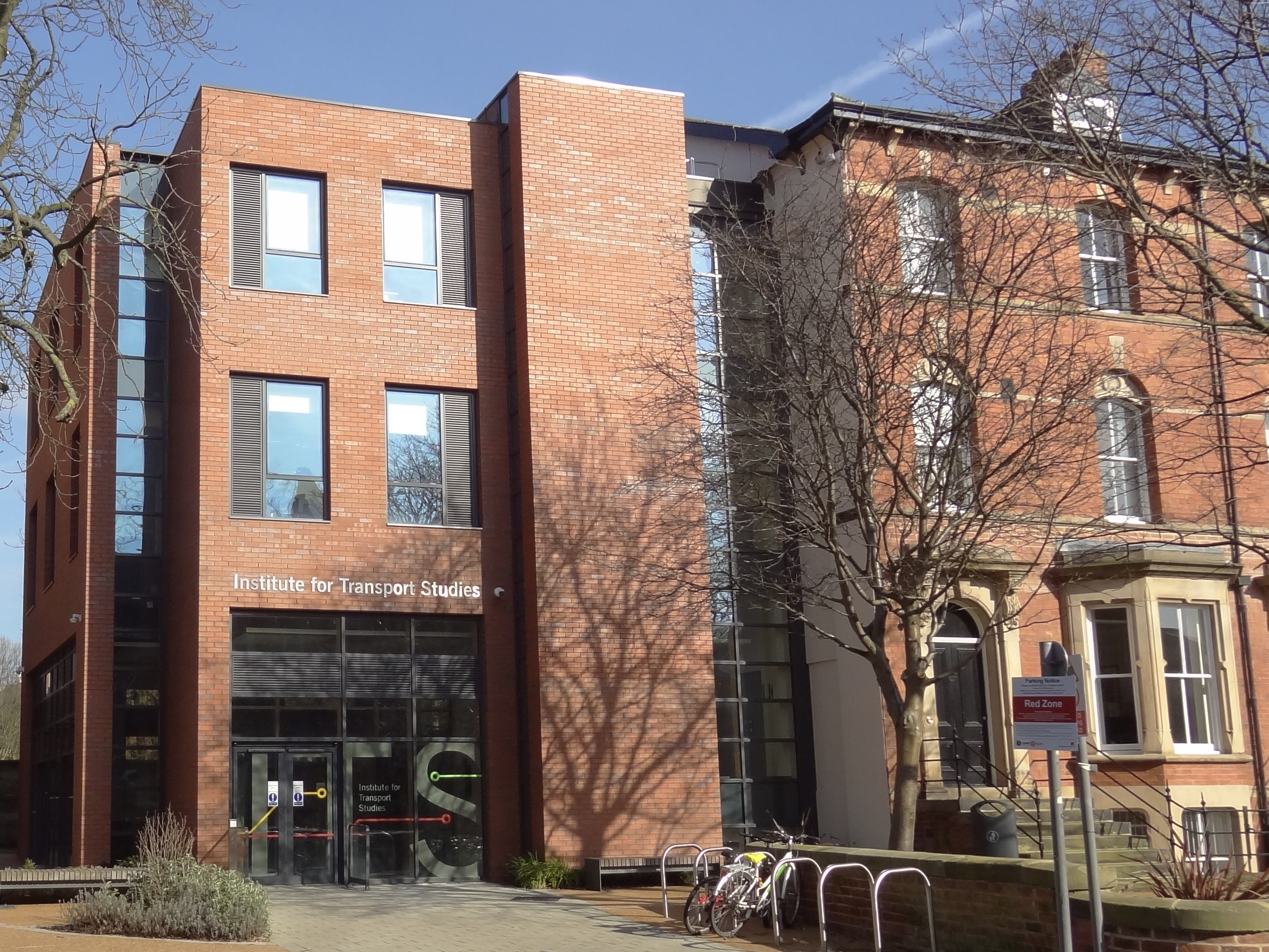
The Institute for Transport Studies building

The Institute for Transport Studies (ITS) is a school within the University of Leeds in the UK. The institute is one of the leading centres for teaching and research in transport in the United Kingdom, and attracts a number of students from outside the UK for its Masters and PhD programmes.

== The Institute ==
The University of Leeds first offered a Transport Planning & Engineering Masters programme in 1965 and this evolved by 1972 into a fully fledged Institute within the university.

The Institute is based on University Road, within the main University of Leeds campus, housing approximately 90 academic/research staff. ITS received royal recognition in 2009 by winning a prestigious Queen's Anniversary Prize for Higher and Further Education - the prize was awarded for "sustained excellence - 40 years' impact in transport research and teaching."

== Teaching ==
Teaching at ITS focuses on three levels, with perhaps the best known of these being the postgraduate programmes, which attract students from around the world.

=== Undergraduate ===
Undergraduate programmes are offered in conjunction with other departments of the University of Leeds, such as Geography and Civil Engineering. A range of ITS elective modules are available for students from any discipline and staff of the Institute regularly teach on undergraduate modules hosted in other Faculties.

=== Masters ===
ITS offers Masters programmes, available as 1 year of full-time study, or 2–3 years part-time study. These are considered amongst the best available in the world, and attract students from around the world including from a number of European, Asian, America, and African countries.

=== Graduate Employability ===
After graduating, many full-time students obtain jobs in transport consultancy (or with other employers), whereas part-time students are often already working in transport planning for a consultancy or a local authority.

=== Doctoral ===
PhD research at ITS attracts students from around the world. Research students are highly valued within ITS and despite often being at the early stages of their careers, are expected to make important contributions. Each student is encouraged to play an active role in the range of activities undertaken both within and across Research Groups.

== Research ==
ITS is one of the world's leading international centres for transport research. Research accounts for around two-thirds of all ITS activity and ranges from blue-skies exploration of new concepts through to applied research and work commissioned by specific clients.

ITS research is particularly notable for its breadth and depth, the international quality of which has been verified by the Research Excellence Framework (REF) stretching back over a period of 30+ years. This is a function both of the size and nature of ITS; the inter- and multi-disciplinary approach brings together researchers of various backgrounds and means that ITS has the capability to research topics from a combination of differing perspectives.

ITS research is sponsored by a wide variety of organisations, including the UK Department for Transport, the European Commission, and the Engineering and Physical Sciences Research Council.

== Research facilities ==
The University of Leeds Driving Simulator (UoLDS) is one of the most advanced worldwide in a research environment and allows research into driver behaviour to be performed in accurately controlled and repeatable laboratory conditions. UoLDS is a major research facility and was established in 2006 at a cost of over £1m. It provides the scope to undertake a wide variety of research, including much that would not be safe, ethical or cost effective to do on real roads. It is supported and operated by an expert team, who can tailor virtual scenarios and experimental data collection to the exact requirements of a particular investigation. Research projects include:

- Intelligent Speed Adaptation
- Driver distraction by in-vehicle systems
- Speed choice and road environment
- Driver comprehension of traffic signs
- Advanced Driver Assistance Systems
- Vehicle design: active bonnet system
- Driver behaviour in narrow lanes
- Reduction of fatigue related accidents

See the University of Leeds Driving Simulator website.

== Staff ==
The institute has around 100 staff members in total, consisting primarily of academic staff (teaching/research) and professional services staff. The precise number fluctuates, as ITS welcomes visiting academics on a regular basis, typically for stays of 1–12 months.

Academic staff are organised into 5 research groups:

- Economics and Appraisal
- Spatial Modelling and Dynamics
- Social and Political Sciences
- Choice Modelling
- Human Factors and Safety

== Alumni ==
ITS graduates go on to take up employment in the transport sector, commonly but not limited to, roles in academia, consultancy, government and operators. Prominent UK-based alumni include:

- Michèle Dix - Managing Director, Crossrail 2.
- John Nightingale - former president, Institute of Highway Engineers (IHE).
- Ben Still, Managing Director, West Yorkshire Combined Authority.
- John Thomas - Regulatory Affairs Advisor, Etihad Rail. Formerly Director of Competition and Regulatory Economics, Office of Rail Regulation.
- Richard Turner OBE - former Chief Executive, Freight Transport Association.
- Kevin Austin, Director of Initiatives, C40 Cities. Formerly Head of Olympic Projects for London 2012, Greater London Authority.

Internationally:

- Bekele Geleta - former Secretary General, International Federation of Red Cross and Red Crescent Societies
- Richard Humphreys – Transport Program, The World Bank
- Fotis Karamitsos - Head of Maritime Transport & Intelligent Transport, The European Commission
- Jamie Leather - Transport Specialist, Asian Development Bank
- Man Ho Lee - Chief Transport Officer, Hong Kong Government
