= The National Byway =

Cycle route in the UK

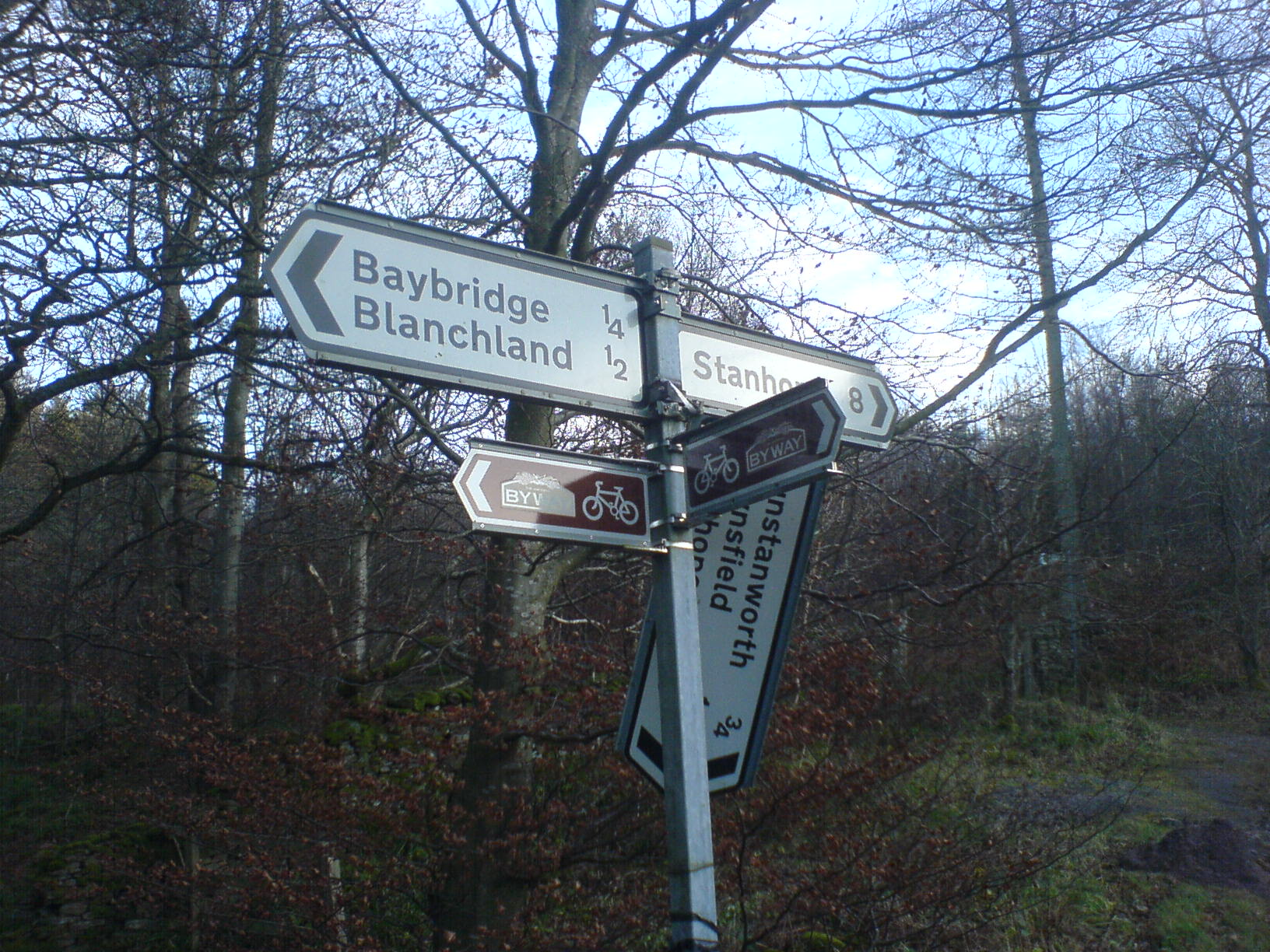
An example National Byway signpost

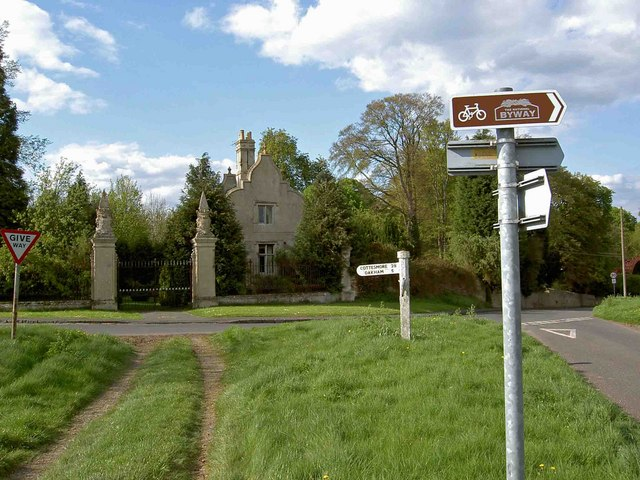
National Byway sign at a road junction

The National Byway is a 3,200-mile (5,100-kilometre) signposted cycling route round England and parts of Scotland and Wales. It runs along quiet roads, rather than a mixture of roads and tracks like the National Cycle Network, making it more appropriate for road bikes. The route is managed by the registered charity "The National Byway", with Patron Viscount Linley and President Lord Foster of Thames Bank. Cycling Britain describes the route as offering "over 4000 miles of safe and easy-to-follow signposted cycle routes around the UK." Maps are available from the National Byway web site and Sustrans.

The National Byway has received over one million pounds of funding for various projects from the Landfill Tax Credit Scheme.

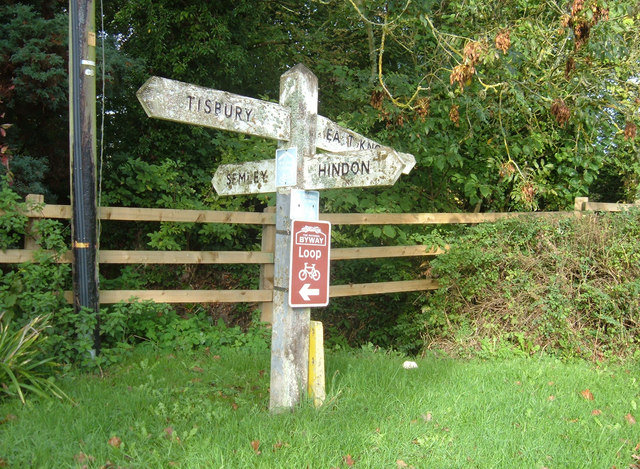
National Byway signpost
