= European Rail Traffic Management System in Great Britain =

The European Rail Traffic Management System (ERTMS) is an initiative backed by the European Union to enhance cross-border interoperability and the procurement of signalling equipment by creating a single Europe-wide standard for train control and command systems.

Its main components are the European Train Control System (ETCS) and the GSM-R communications system. ETCS is a standard for track-train radio communications using balises (Eurobalises) and associated in-cab train control, while GSM-R is the GSM mobile communications standard for railway operations. ERTMS can operate at different levels depending on specific local requirements. (Note: Three levels have been identified for ERTMS: Level 1 – ERTMS is added to or overlaid on lineside signals and train detectors. Communication is via balises (Eurobalises) of an existing railway system.; Level 2 – ERTMS uses balises to communicate with the driver, thereby dispensing with lineside signalling equipment. The location of each block is fixed (as with traditional railway systems).; Level 3 – Level 3 is an enhancement on Level 2 whereby the block will move with the train.) Under ERTMS speeds are displayed in the driver's cab in km/h and at Level 2, lineside speed indicators are optional.

== History ==
In 2007 the British Government published its response to a European Union directive requiring the use of ERTMS on High Speed (TEN-R) and Conventional Trans-European Railway Network (TEN) routes. The response proposed a roll-out plan of ERTMS equipment on existing lines that would be completed by 2044, though the actual timing of the programme will depend on changing circumstances. New trains would be ordered with ERTMS equipment on board and ERTMS would be installed during any electrification programs. In 2009, the Rail Safety & Standards Board confirmed that km/h would be used on ERTMS lines in the United Kingdom. With the ongoing introduction of ERTMS, it is foreseen that the metrication of British rail transport will be completed over the next few decades.

The Uff/Cullen inquiry in 2001, following the Southall and Ladbroke Grove rail crashes, identified a need for in-cab signalling on high-speed trains, and recommended that ERTMS should be installed onto all of Britain's high-speed lines by the year 2010. However, this timescale was not viable because of the time required to develop the technology.

== Current implementation ==
The Cambrian Line, a low volume 215 km (134 mi) rail link between Shrewsbury in the east and Aberystwyth and Pwllheli in the west, was chosen as Britain's first ERTMS line. This line was chosen as its signalling system had reached the end of its useful life, and because it is a low capacity line almost separate from the national network, making it an ideal site on which to gain ERTMS experience. All speeds in the Cambrian Line Rule book are in km/h.

Line	Status / Date	ERTMS level	Notes
Cambrian Line	Live 2011	Level 2	
Thameslink Core	Live	Level 2	Automatic train operation (ATO) works on top of ETCS
Crossrail (Western section Heathrow to Great Western Mainline)	Live 2020	Level 2	ETCS overlay over existing signally planned Paddington to Airport Junction (i.e. where the Heathrow link leaves the Great Western Mainline)
Heathrow Express (Tunnel Section)	Live 2020	Level 2	ETCS currently in operation in the tunnel section only. Expansion onto the mainline to Ealing Broadway is expected before the end of 2023
Northern City Line (Moorgate to ECML Finsbury Park) as part of East coast digital programme.	Live 2024	Level 2	Connected to the larger ECML project above (trains using the Northern City Line run on to the ECML). First went live in November 2023, with all trains/drivers using the new signalling in November 2024. Signals were removed from the line in May 2025.
ECML South (Kings Cross to Peterborough)	Installation and testing (2030s)	Level 2	Expected to be operational 'early 2030s' The first passenger service to run on tranche 2 (Welwyn to Hitchin Overlay) under ETCS ran 31 August 2026. Tranche 4 (full roll-out) December 2029
High Speed 2	Planned (2029–2033)	Level 2	
Transpennine Route Upgrade between Stalybridge and Colton Junction	Live 2030+	Level 2	Current plans (subject to change) to start role out of overlay mode 2032, with signals being removed 2035

== Metric and Imperial units ==
A standard feature of the speedometers used by ERTMS/ETCS systems is the use of the metric system. At a Railway Conference in 2002, it was argued that a changeover to using metric units for speed in advance of the introduction of ERTMS was unlikely to be financially viable unless the decision is taken to adopt Level 2 ERTMS without lineside signalling. There would however still be a need to handle both mph and km/h in driver cabs. A 2010 voluntary standards document published by the Rail Safety & Standards Board addressed this issue when it recommended that the speedometer of a ETCS system be designed so that it switches automatically between mph and km/h depending on the route being traversed. The speedometer would display "mph" when the speedometer was displaying "miles per hour", otherwise would display nothing. Its graduations would be chosen such that the angle of the needle would not change when the system switched from one scale to the other. The conversion between metric and imperial units would be a function of the speedometer, not of any other on-board equipment. In 2012 a technical specification matching this proposal was published.

== See also ==
- Rail transport in Great Britain
