= Medellín =

City in Colombia

- District and city
- Special District of Science, Technology and Innovation of Medellín; Distrito Especial de Ciencia, Tecnología e Innovación de Medellín
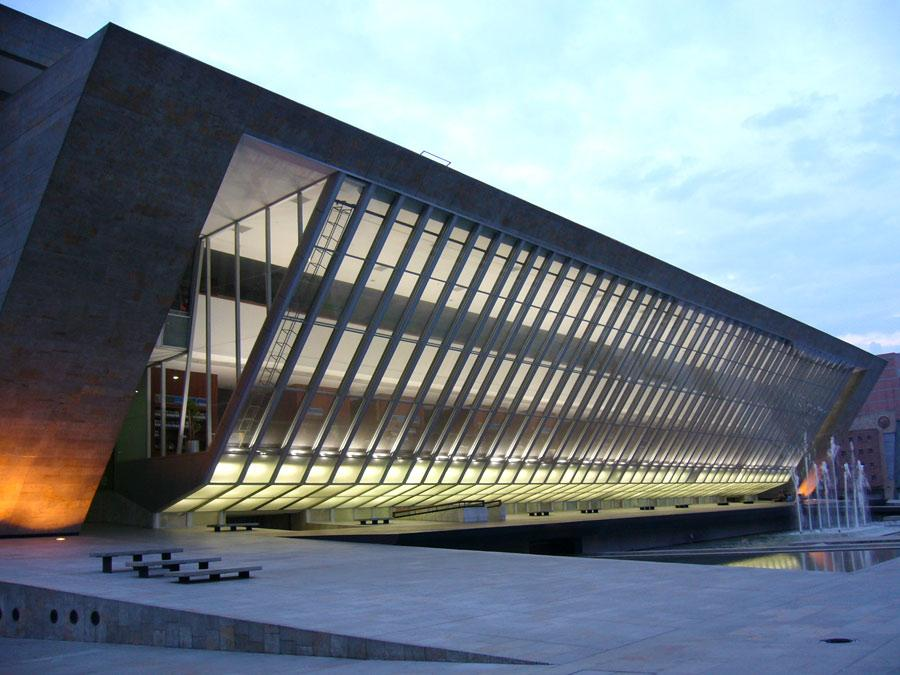
- Medellin Downtown Medellin Metro El Castillo Museum Botero Plaza EPM Library 'Pueblito Paisa' in the Nutibara Hill Plaza de la Libertad building El Poblado neighborhood

- Flag Coat of arms
- Nicknames: Ciudad de la eterna primavera (City of the Eternal Spring); Capital de la montaña (Capital of the Mountain); Ciudad de las flores (City of the Flowers)
- Location of Medellin in Antioquia
- Interactive map of Medellín
- Location within Colombia Location within South America
- Coordinates: 6°13′51″N 75°35′26″W
- Country: Colombia
- Region: Aburrá Valley
- Department: Antioquia
- Founded: 2 March 1616
- Named for: Medellín Village

Government
  - Type: Mayor–council
  - Body: Alcaldía de Medellín
  - Mayor: Federico Gutiérrez

Area
  - District and city: 380.64 km^{2} (146.97 sq mi)
  - Urban: 120.9 km^{2} (46.7 sq mi)
  - Metro: 1,152 km^{2} (445 sq mi)
- Elevation: 1,495 m (4,905 ft)

Population (2020)
  - District and city: 2,427,129
  - Rank: 2nd in Colombia; 9th in South America
  - Density: 6,376.4/km^{2} (16,515/sq mi)
  - Urban: 2,490,164
  - Urban density: 20,596/km^{2} (53,340/sq mi)
  - Metro: 4,212,261
  - Metro density: 6,925/km^{2} (17,940/sq mi)
- Demonym: Medellinense

GDP (Nominal, 2026)
  - Metro: US$68.7 billion
  - Per capita: US$16,400
- Time zone: UTC−05:00 (COT)
- Area code: +57 604
- Climate: Tropical rainforest
- International airports: José María Córdova International Airport
- Rapid transit system: Medellín Metro, SITVA
- Website: www.medellin.gov.co (in Spanish)

Medellín (/ˌmɛdeɪˈ(j)iːn/ MED-ay-(Y)EEN; Spanish: [meðeˈʝin] or [meðeˈʎin]), officially the Special District of Science, Technology and Innovation of Medellín (Spanish: Distrito Especial de Ciencia, Tecnología e Innovación de Medellín), is the capital of the department of Antioquia, and the second-largest city in Colombia after Bogotá. It is located in the Aburrá Valley, a central region of the Andes Mountains, in northwestern South America. The city's population was 2,427,129 at the 2018 census. The metro area of Medellín is the second-largest urban agglomeration in Colombia in terms of population and economy, with more than 4 million people.

In 1616, the Spaniard Francisco de Herrera Campuzano erected a small indigenous village (poblado) known as "Saint Lawrence of Aburrá" (San Lorenzo de Aburrá), located in the present-day El Poblado commune. On 2 November 1675, the queen consort Mariana of Austria founded the "Town of Our Lady of Candelaria of Medellín" (Villa de Nuestra Señora de la Candelaria de Medellín) in the Aná region, which today corresponds to the center of the city (east-central zone) and first describes the region as "Medellín". In 1826, the city was named the capital of the Department of Antioquia by the National Congress of the nascent Republic of Gran Colombia, comprising present-day Colombia, Venezuela, Ecuador, and Panama. After Colombia won its independence from Spain, Medellín became the capital of the Federal State of Antioquia until 1888, with the proclamation of the Colombian Constitution of 1886. During the 19th century, Medellín was a dynamic commercial center, first exporting gold, then producing and exporting coffee.

Towards the end of the 20th century and into the beginning of the 21st, the city regained industrial dynamism, with the construction of the Medellín Metro commuter rail, liberalized development policies and improvement in security and education. Researchers at the Overseas Development Institute have lauded the city as a pioneer of a post-Washington Consensus "local development state" model of economic development. The city is promoted internationally as a tourist destination and is considered a global city type "Gamma +" by the Globalization and World Cities Research Network. The Medellín Metropolitan Area produces 67% of the Department of Antioquia's GDP and 11% of the economy of Colombia. Medellín is important to the region for its universities, academies, commerce, industry, science, health services, flower-growing, and festivals.

In February 2013, the Urban Land Institute chose Medellín as the most innovative city in the world due to its recent advances in politics, education, and social development. In the same year, Medellín won the Veronica Rudge Urbanism Award conferred by Harvard University to the Urban Development Enterprise, mainly due to the North-Western Integral Development Project in the city. Medellín hosted UN-Habitat's 7th World Urban Forum in 2014. In 2016, the city won the Lee Kuan Yew World City Prize. The award seeks to recognize and celebrate efforts in furthering innovation in urban solutions and sustainable urban development.

== Toponymy ==
The valley and its Spanish settlement have gone by several names over the years, including Aburrá de los Yamesíes, "Valley of Saint Bartholomew", "Saint Lawrence of Aburrá", "Saint Lawrence of Aná", Villa de la Candelaria de Medellín, and finally "Medellín".

The name "Medellín" comes from Medellín, Spain, a small village in the Province of Badajoz in Extremadura. The village was the birthplace of Hernán Cortés. The Spanish Medellín, in turn, was originally called "Metellinum" and was named after Roman general Quintus Caecilius Metellus Pius in 75 BC, who founded the village as a military base.

Some of the Conquistadors, such as Gaspar de Rodas, the first governor of Antioquia, came from Badajoz Province. Count Pedro Portocarrero y Luna, President of the Council for the West Indies (Consejo de Indias), asked the Monarchy of Spain to give the name of his town to the new settlement in America. His request was accepted on 22 November 1674, when queen regent Mariana of Austria proclaimed the city's name to be Villa de Nuestra Señora de Medellín. Miguel Aguinaga y Mendiogoitia, Governor, made the name official on 2 November 1675. The Crown granted a coat of arms to the city on 24 June 1676.

== History ==
=== Pre-Columbian era and settlers ===
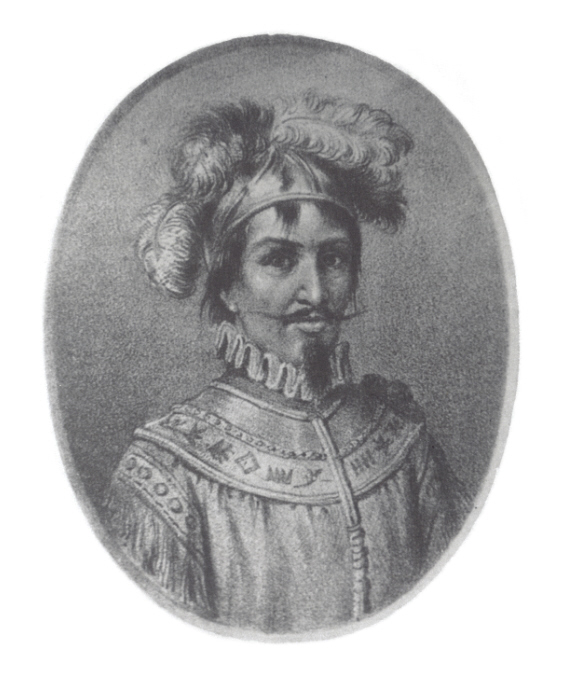
Spanish conquistador Marshal Jorge Robledo

In August 1541, Marshal Jorge Robledo was in the place known today as Heliconia when he saw in the distance what he thought was a valley. He sent Jerónimo Luis Tejelo to explore the territory, and during the night of 23 August, Tejelo reached the plain of what is now Aburrá Valley. The Spaniards gave it the name of "Valley of Saint Bartholomew", but this was soon changed for the native name Aburrá "Painters" because of the textile decorations of the local rulers.

In 1574, Gaspar de Rodas asked the Antioquia's cabildo for 10 square kilometers (4 mi^{2}) of land to establish herds and a ranch in the valley. The Cabildo granted him 8 square kilometers (3 mi^{2}) of land.

In 1616, the colonial visitor Francisco de Herrera y Campuzano founded a settlement with 80 Amerindians, naming it Poblado de San Lorenzo, now El Poblado. In 1646, a colonial law on casta ordered the separation of Indigenous peoples (indios) from mestizos and mulattos. The colonial administration began the construction of a new town in Aná, today Berrío Park, where the church of Nuestra Señora de la Candelaria de Aná ("Our Lady of Candelaria of Aná") was built. Three years later, the Spaniards started the construction of the Basilica of Our Lady of Candelaria, which was rebuilt at the end of the 18th century.

=== Growth of the town ===
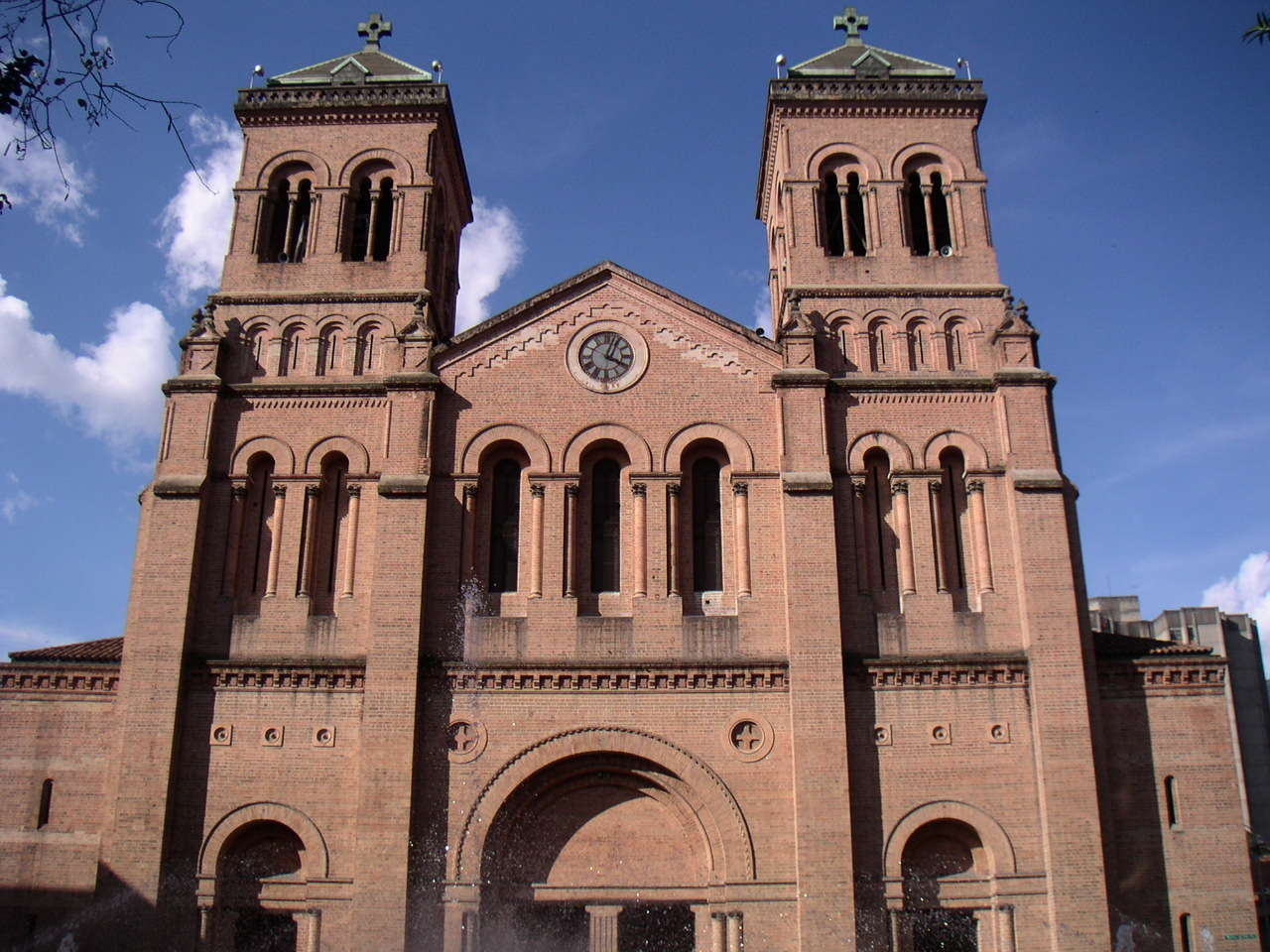
Metropolitan Cathedral of Medellín

After 1574, with Gaspar de Rodas settled in the valley, the population started to grow. According to the church records of the San Lorenzo Church, six couples married between 1646 and 1650, and 41 between 1671 and 1675. Gold mines were developed northeast of Antioquia, thus they needed food supply from nearby agriculture. The Aburrá Valley was in a strategic position between the gold mines and the first provincial capital of Antioquia, Santa Fe de Antioquia.

The provincial capital, Santa Fe, started to lose importance and gradually became poor, as trade and prominent personalities of the region came to the Aburrá Valley, where rich families started to buy land. Soon, the first settlers asked for the creation of a Cabildo (council) in the valley, thus getting a separate government from Santa Fe. The Santa Fe government fought this, but Mariana of Austria signed the edict creating the Cabildo on 22 November 1674. The governor Miguel de Aguinaga proclaimed the royal edict on 2 November 1675. The new city was given the title of Villa de Nuestra Señora de la Candelaria.

=== During the Spanish colonial period ===
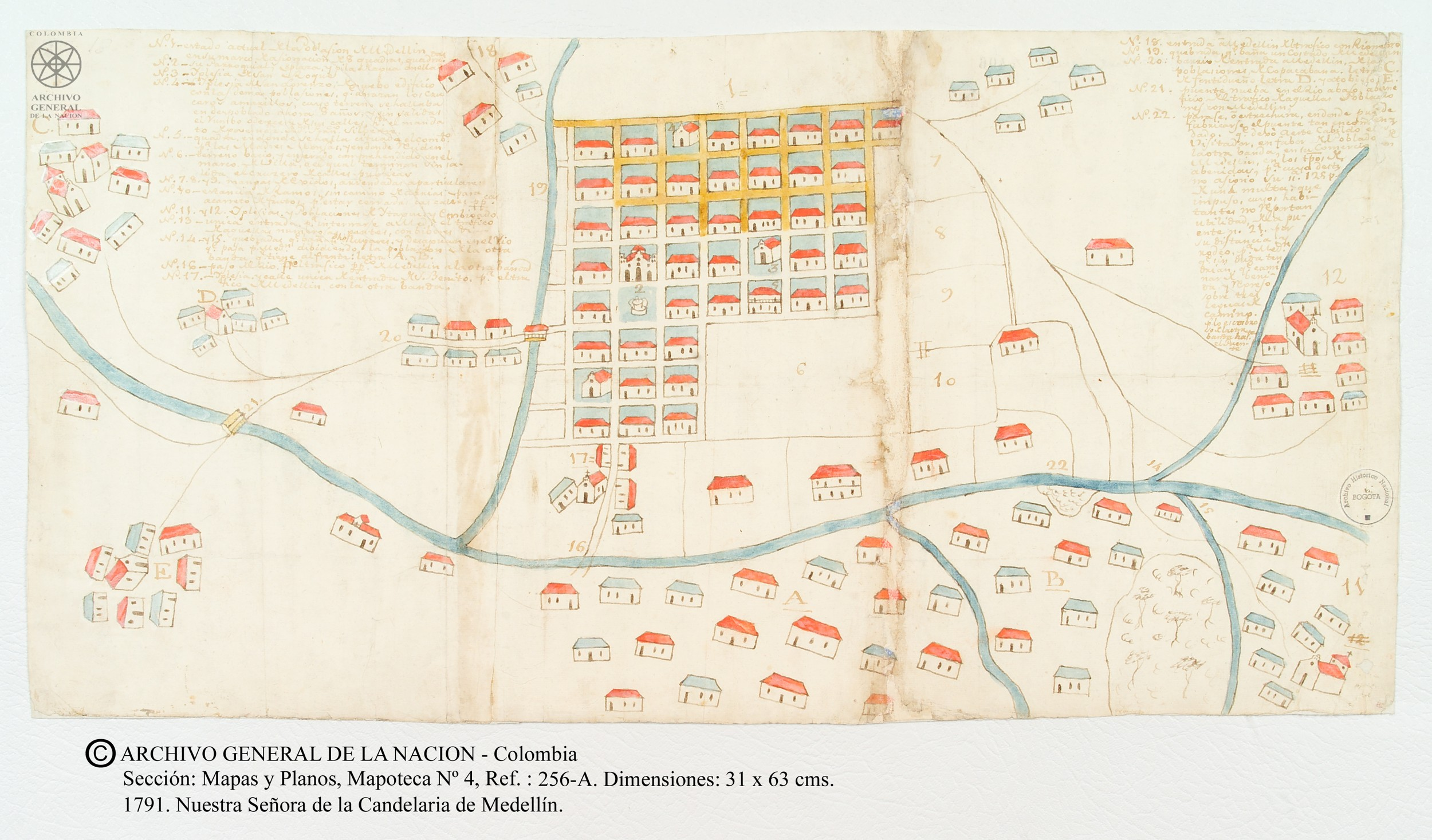
Map of Medellín in 1791

Before the creation of the town, the inhabitants were scattered throughout the valley, with only a few families concentrated at the confluence of the Aná (today called the Santa Elena) and the Medellín rivers; others lived in El Poblado San Lorenzo. After the royal edict, the settlers chose the Aná site as the heart of the future city, with the Candelaria Church at its center.

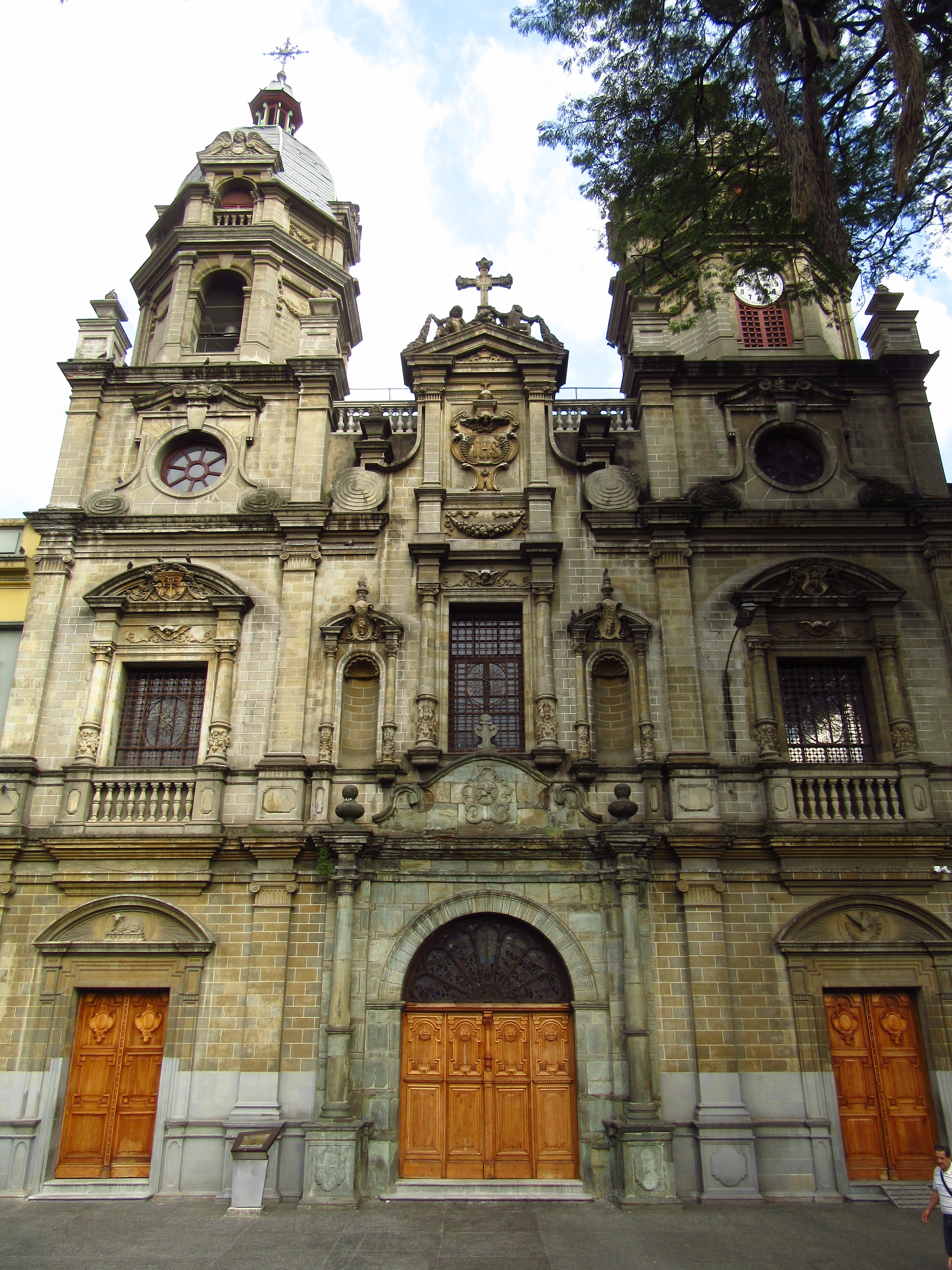
San Ignacio Church, an example of colonial architecture in Colombia

Their first buildings were simple, with thatched roofs. The houses of the most important people were two stories tall, and the church and the Cabildo were unimpressive. It was only during the 18th century that the church was improved. Only one story, the Cabildo was located at the western part of the plaza. It had a thatched roof until 1742 when tiles were put on. In 1682, traders and foreigners started the construction of the Veracruz Hermitage, which was consecrated as a church by the Bishop of Popayán in 1712.

In 1675, the first census during colonial times was taken: there were 3,000 people and 280 families. Another census was not taken until the colonial Visitador (royal inspector) Antonio Mon y Velarde es ordered one between 1786 and 1787: there were then 14,507 people and 241 families. In 1808, two years before Colombia won independence, the city had 15,347 people and 360 families.

In 1803, the Royal College of the Franciscans was founded in the Central Plaza, which is Berrío Park today, with the initial departments of Grammar, Philosophy, and Theology. Soon after, the college moved to a new building in the small San Ignacio square. In 1821 it was renamed Colegio de Antioquia, and it became the University of Antioquia in 1901. The university also had the first vocational training school, the first cultural radio station in Latin America, and the first regional botanical garden.

=== Industrial revolution ===
In the first half of the twentieth century, the population of Medellín increased sixfold, from 59,815 inhabitants in 1905 to 358,189 in 1951. The Thousand Days War (1899–1902) stopped the industrial development of the city, although the civil war did not affect the region directly. Under reforms by President Rafael Reyes after the conflict, the city continued its industrial development and founded a Chamber of commerce. The Chamber developed a regional transport project that connected Medellín to other Colombian regions and other nations.

Despite the importance of gold production in the early development of Medellín, the export of coffee contributed the most impetus in the 20th century for the city's growth. Trade grew to international dimensions as the main export of Colombia became coffee. The industrial and commercial dynamism of Medellín also created a caste of traders and entrepreneurs, who founded the first nationwide industries in Colombia.

=== Trade in Medellín ===
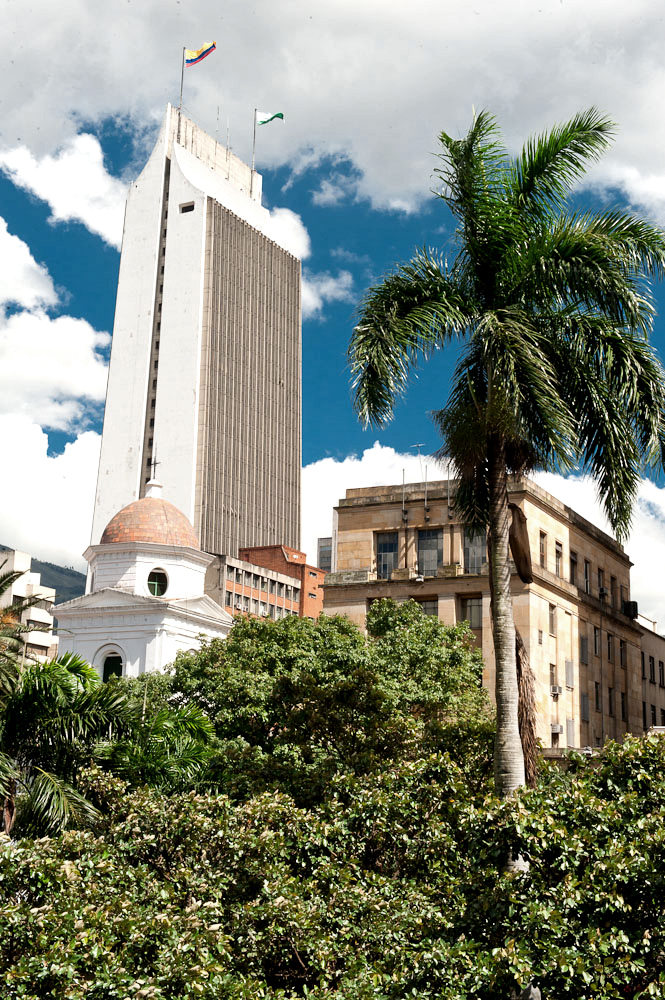
Coltejer Building, the tallest building in Medellín

Coltejer is one of the most important textile companies in Colombia. It was founded in Medellín by Alejandro Echavarría on 22 October 1907. Its headquarters, the Coltejer Building, is the tallest skyscraper in Medellín and the fourth tallest building in Colombia.

The discovery of coal in Amagá, a few kilometers south of the Aburrá Valley, and the building of hydroelectric plants provided the new industries with energy, and this allowed the creation of many smaller companies. The Antioquia Railway (built in 1875) conquered the difficult geography of one of the most mountainous regions of South America, notably with the La Quiebra Tunnel, which connected the industrial center to the Magdalena River, the most major navigable river in Colombia. In 1932 Medellín also built its first airport, the Enrique Olaya Herrera Airport.

The study by Charles H. Savage on industrial production in Antioquia between 1960 and 1972 showed how important Medellín industries became to Colombia and South America. He studied social change produced by the introduction of new technology. Savage looked at three factories in Antioquia: two potteries in Santuario and La Blanca, and a tailoring factory in Medellín. Savage studied the production of the Antioquian factories, and the relationship between the workers and their employers, an industrial efficiency which he called the "Culture of Work". His conclusions were published by his colleague George F. Lombardi as Sons of the Machine (1988).

=== Art in the early 20th century ===
Arts and literature have been an important social element in Medellín. The University of Antioquia, the National University of Colombia with its Medellín branch, and the Pontifical Bolivarian University have historically been the academic centers of the city and are responsible for the formation of an intellectual class in the region.

During the first part of the 20th century, the city was part of the literary transition from romanticism to the modern art and literary movements of the new century. The writer Tomás Carrasquilla (1858–1940) focused on the people of his native Antioquia, portraying their daily lives and customs. The writer and philosopher Fernando González from Envigado (in the metropolitan area of Medellín), the cartoonist Ricardo Rendón, and the poet León de Greiff were some of the founders of Los Panidas, a Medellín literary movement. Other featured poets and writers were Porfirio Barba-Jacob and Efe Gómez. In painting, the most famous were Eladio Vélez and Pedro Nel Gómez. Carlos Vieco Ortiz was a popular composer and musician. Medellín became the headquarters of record labels like Sonolux, Ondina, and Silver.

Medellín clubs, many of them dating to the end of the 19th century, became a center for intellectual and industrialist movements, like Club Union (founded in 1894) and Club Campestre (founded in 1924). In 1909, the Circo España was created, and Bolívar Theater in 1919. The art nouveau Junín Theater was demolished to build the Coltejer Tower, now the tallest building in the city. Cine Colombia, the first movie distributor of the country, was founded in Medellín in 1927.

=== Growth in the second half of the 20th century ===
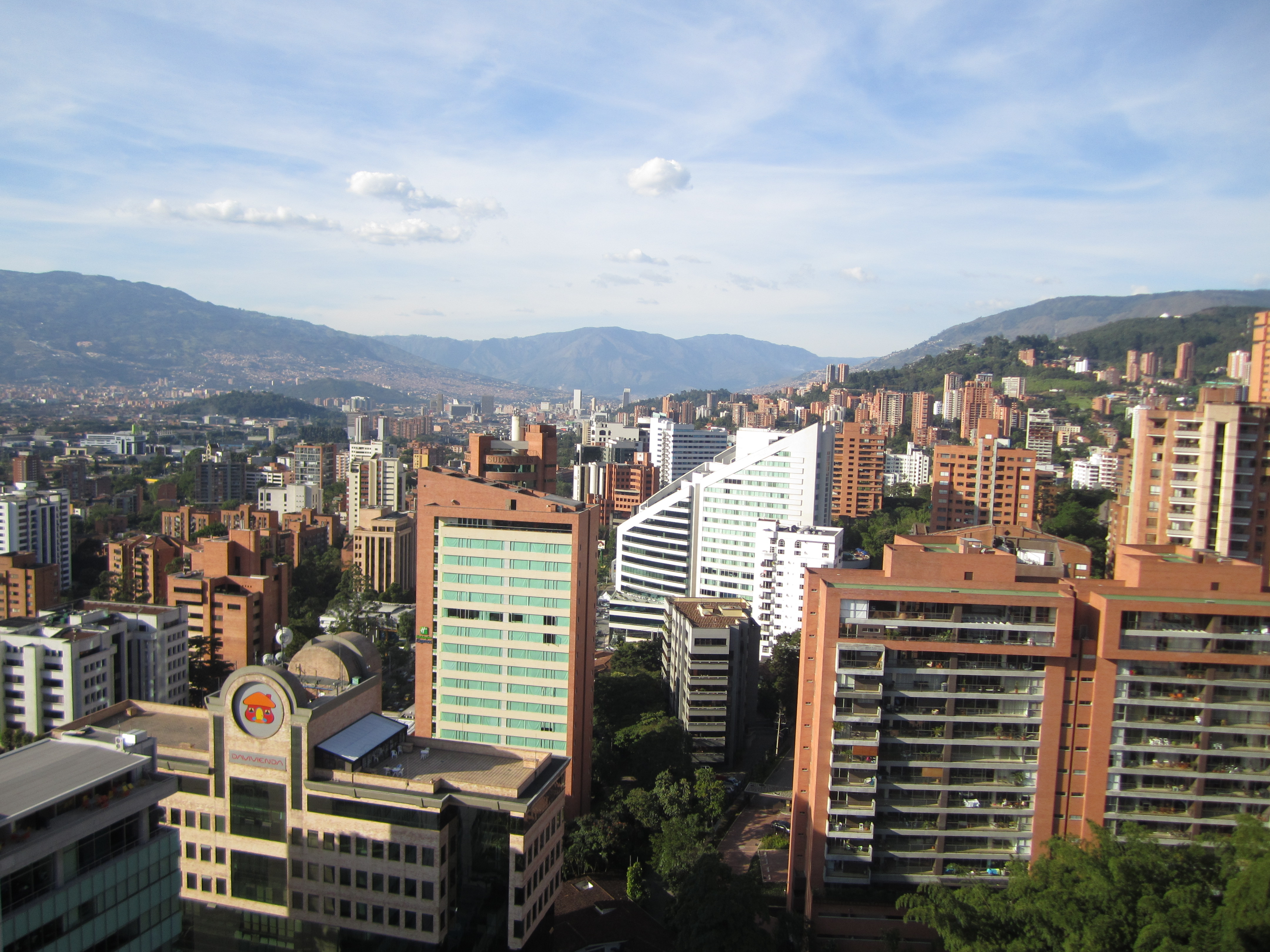
El Poblado, a wealthy district located in the southern part of the city, is one of Colombia's most important urban and economic centers

Colombia entered a new era of political instability with the murder of presidential candidate Jorge Eliecer Gaitán in Bogotá in 1948. Political violence spread in the rural areas of Colombia, and farmers fled to the cities. The Valley slopes became overpopulated with slums.

As the population of Medellín grew quickly during the 1950s, industrialists, traders and local government created the "Medellín Master Plan" (MMP) (Plan Piloto), a plan for the expansion of the city into the Aburrá Valley that would lead to the creation of the first metropolitan area in Colombia. Paul Lester Wiener and José Luis Sert were the architects who led the project. Among the main features of the MMP were the canalization of the Medellín River, the control of new settlements on valley slopes, the creation of an industrial zone in the Guayabal District, the planning of the city to be in harmony with the river, the construction of a city stadium, and an administrative center in La Alpujarra. Little of the plan was actually done.

In 1951 the city had 358,189 inhabitants, but 22 years later, in 1973, the population had tripled to 1,071,252. The population explosion had several consequences for the MMP. The urban limits of the city grew to areas that were not contemplated in the MMP, so that Medellín now reached the urban areas of other cities of the Aburrá Valley, like Envigado, Bello and Itagüí; the new Medellín settlers were poor families without enough credit to buy their own homes, so several neighborhoods were built beyond the MMP; several old downtown buildings were demolished to construct tall towers, offices, and avenues.

In 1968 the Second Conference of CELAM was held in Medellín expressing a preferential option for the poor. The traditional Junin Theatre along the Santa Elena was demolished to build the Coltejer Tower. The huge migration into Medellín provided workers for the expansion of textile factories, being modernized in this period, but it also created new problems for the city: higher unemployment, lack of services for poor areas, urban violence in several districts, and collapse of any hope of a transport system.

=== Today ===
The position of Medellín as an industrial city in Antioquia has been the main factor in overcoming its crisis of the 1980s and 1990s. The Medellín Metro, a massive urban transport service, became the pride of the city. The construction of the Plaza Mayor of Medellín, an international center for congresses and expositions, was designed to showcase the globalized economy of Colombia to the world.

Social exclusion has eased due to the development of a transport infrastructure; a new system of public buses called "Metroplus" opened in December 2011, and gondolas called "MetroCable", which help connect the poorest barrio communities in the hills to the city, have been in operation since 2004, with more routes being added in recent years. Additionally, an electric escalator 1,260 feet long was inaugurated on 26 December 2011, in Comuna 13, one of Medellín's poorest neighborhoods, making it one of the first of its kind in the world. Today's Medellín includes spaces for art, poetry, drama, the construction of public libraries, the foundation of new ecological parks, and the inclusion of people of the city in its development.

In 2012, Medellín was among 200 cities around the world, including New York and Tel Aviv, nominated for Most Innovative City of the Year due to a great advancement in public transportation, with more than 500,000 residents and visitors using its Metro train system each day; a public bike-share program; new facilities and landmarks, including the España Library and a cultural center in Moravia; a large outdoor escalator the size of a 28-story building, enabling residents of the city's elevated Comuna 13 neighborhood to safely ride down the steep hillside; and a Metro system which reduces Medellín's CO_{2} emissions by 175,000 tons each year. Medellín has the biggest research-dedicated building in Colombia, called University Research Building (Spanish: Sede de Investigación Universitaria, SIU), a facility that concentrates the top research groups of the University of Antioquia.

== Geography ==
Medellín has 16 comunas (districts), 5 corregimientos (townships), and 271 barrios (neighborhoods). The metropolitan area of Medellín lies within the Aburrá valley at an elevation of 1,500 meters (4,900 feet) above sea level and is bisected by the Medellín River (also called Porce), which flows northward. North of the valley are the towns of Bello, Copacabana, Girardota, and Barbosa. To the south of the valley lie Itagüí, Envigado, Sabaneta, La Estrella, and Caldas.

=== Climate ===
The weather in Medellín is warm year-round with few temperature extremes. As a municipality, Medellín has an area of 382 km^{2} (147 sq mi). Medellín features a tropical monsoon climate (Am). Since Medellín is located at 1,495 m (4,900 ft) above sea level, its climate is not as hot as other cities located at the same latitude near the equator. Because of its altitude above sea level and privileged location in the Andes Range, Medellín's weather at times is more characteristic of a humid subtropical climate than that of a tropical climate. The city's average annual temperature is 22 °C (72 °F), and because of its proximity to the equator, its temperature is constant year-round, with minimal temperature variations. Temperatures range from 17 to 28 °C (63 to 82 °F). Because of the pleasant springlike climate all year, Medellín is known as "La Ciudad de la Eterna Primavera" or "City of the Eternal Spring". The city is located in a valley and many of its districts are on slopes; temperatures can be slightly cooler on the surrounding mountains.

Climate data for Medellín (Olaya Herrera Airport), elevation 1,490 m (4,890 ft), (1991–2020)
| Month | Jan | Feb | Mar | Apr | May | Jun | Jul | Aug | Sep | Oct | Nov | Dec | Year |
|---|---|---|---|---|---|---|---|---|---|---|---|---|---|
| Record high °C (°F) | 33.2 (91.8) | 35.0 (95.0) | 36.0 (96.8) | 35.0 (95.0) | 36.2 (97.2) | 36.5 (97.7) | 35.6 (96.1) | 36.5 (97.7) | 38.0 (100.4) | 36.5 (97.7) | 37.0 (98.6) | 35.0 (95.0) | 38.0 (100.4) |
| Mean daily maximum °C (°F) | 27.9 (82.2) | 28.3 (82.9) | 28.2 (82.8) | 27.8 (82.0) | 27.9 (82.2) | 28.3 (82.9) | 28.6 (83.5) | 28.7 (83.7) | 28.1 (82.6) | 27.3 (81.1) | 27.1 (80.8) | 27.3 (81.1) | 28.0 (82.4) |
| Daily mean °C (°F) | 23.0 (73.4) | 23.3 (73.9) | 23.1 (73.6) | 22.8 (73.0) | 23.0 (73.4) | 23.7 (74.7) | 24.0 (75.2) | 23.9 (75.0) | 23.2 (73.8) | 22.2 (72.0) | 22.0 (71.6) | 22.5 (72.5) | 23.1 (73.6) |
| Mean daily minimum °C (°F) | 17.5 (63.5) | 17.8 (64.0) | 17.9 (64.2) | 17.9 (64.2) | 18.0 (64.4) | 17.7 (63.9) | 17.5 (63.5) | 17.6 (63.7) | 17.5 (63.5) | 17.4 (63.3) | 17.6 (63.7) | 17.6 (63.7) | 17.7 (63.9) |
| Record low °C (°F) | 9.5 (49.1) | 8.0 (46.4) | 9.0 (48.2) | 9.5 (49.1) | 10.0 (50.0) | 10.0 (50.0) | 8.9 (48.0) | 10.0 (50.0) | 9.6 (49.3) | 9.0 (48.2) | 9.0 (48.2) | 8.2 (46.8) | 8.0 (46.4) |
| Average precipitation mm (inches) | 141.0 (5.55) | 148.8 (5.86) | 250.9 (9.88) | 299.8 (11.80) | 238.5 (9.39) | 87.2 (3.43) | 56.0 (2.20) | 53.4 (2.10) | 114.9 (4.52) | 276.1 (10.87) | 327.3 (12.89) | 244.4 (9.62) | 2,238.2 (88.12) |
| Average precipitation days (≥ 1 mm) | 8.0 | 9.3 | 13.6 | 17.7 | 18.6 | 14.2 | 13.5 | 14.4 | 16.4 | 19.5 | 16.9 | 11.3 | 173.4 |
| Average relative humidity (%) | 66 | 65 | 67 | 70 | 70 | 66 | 63 | 65 | 67 | 71 | 72 | 70 | 67 |
| Mean monthly sunshine hours | 170.5 | 152.6 | 148.8 | 123.0 | 139.5 | 165.0 | 198.4 | 186.0 | 147.0 | 133.3 | 135.0 | 151.9 | 1,851 |
| Mean daily sunshine hours | 5.5 | 5.4 | 4.8 | 4.1 | 4.5 | 5.5 | 6.4 | 6.0 | 4.9 | 4.3 | 4.5 | 4.9 | 5.1 |
Source: Instituto de Hidrologia Meteorologia y Estudios Ambientales (humidity, sun 1971–2010)

== Administrative divisions ==
Communes of Medellín

Medellín is a city governed by a republican democratic system as stated in the Colombian Constitution of 1991, with decentralized government. Administration is shared by the Mayor of Medellín and the Municipal Council, both elected by popular vote.

The municipality is made up of official departments (secretarías) including departments for social mobility, urban culture, social development, education, evaluation and control, government, resources, public works, administrative services, environment, women, and transportation. There are also many departments with a certain autonomy: the Olaya Herrera Airport, the Public Library (Biblioteca Pública Piloto), the College of Antioquia (Colegio Mayor), the Urban Development Enterprise (EDU), the Public Service Enterprise (EPM), the Sport and Recreation Institute (INDER), the General Enterprises of Medellín (EEVVM), the Medellín Bus stations, the General Hospital of Medellín, the health service enterprise "Metrosalud", the Metropolitan Institute of Technology (ITM), the Metro de Medellín, the department for the Administration of the Medellín parks (Metroparques) and Metroseguridad.

The municipality is divided into six zones: The urban zone, which is subdivided into 16 comunas (communes). The communes are further divided into 249 statistical neighborhoods. The remaining zones outside the urban zones comprise five corregimientos (townships).

Further, the municipality belongs to the Medellín Metropolitan Area, which is made up of ten neighboring municipalities.

=== Zones ===
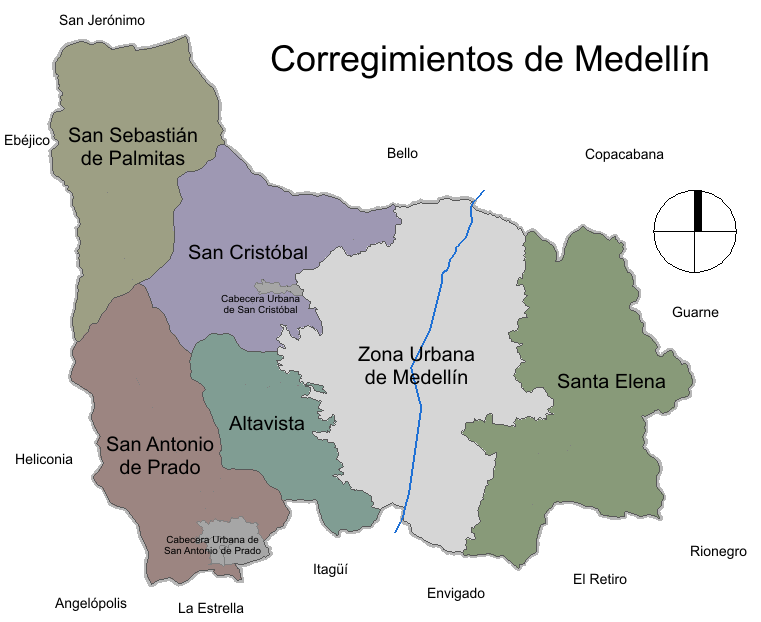
Corregimientos (townships, rural areas) of Medellín

- South-eastern: El Poblado commune.
- South-western: Guayabal and Belén communes.
- West-central: Laureles, La América and San Javier communes.
- East-central: La Candelaria, Villa Hermosa and Buenos Aires communes.
- North-western: Castilla, Doce de Octubre and Robledo communes.
- North-eastern: Aranjuez, Manrique, Popular and Santa Cruz communes.
- Corregimientos (townships): San Sebastián de Palmitas, San Cristóbal, Altavista, San Antonio de Prado and Santa Elena.

== Law and government ==
The government of the city of Medellín is divided into executive and legislative branches. The mayor of the city (Alcalde) is publicly elected for a term of four years (just like the president and the governor of any other department in Colombia).

=== Local development state ===
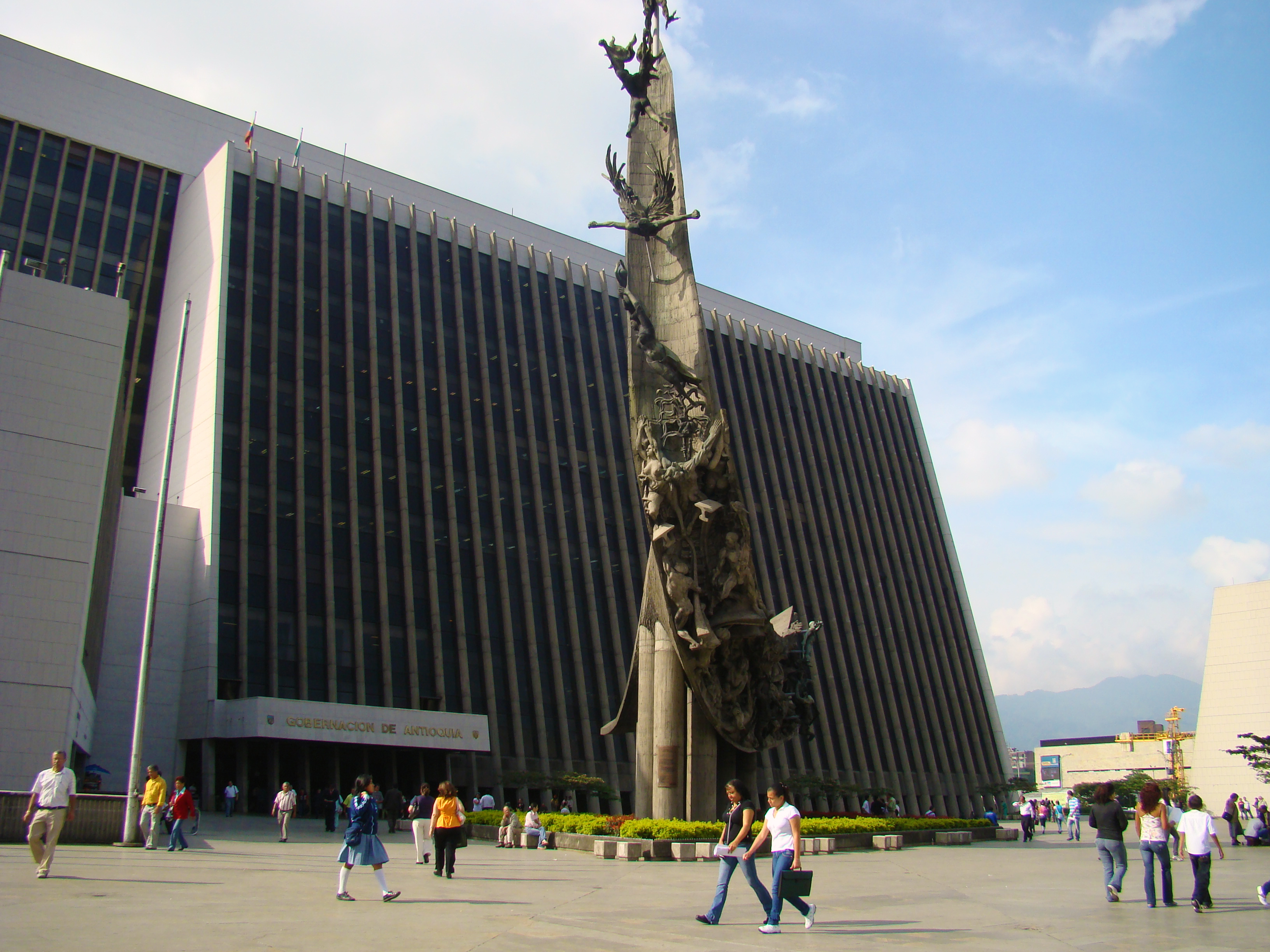
La Alpujarra offices of the mayor of the city and the governor of the Antioquia department

Low tax rates mean Medellín's city administration's social and economic development policies have been funded by the city's ownership of the main energy supplier, Empresas Publicas de Medellín (EPM); 30% of its profits go directly to the city's administrative budget. In addition to infrastructure projects, the city administration has developed a program of cash grants called 'the Medellín Solidaria' program that is very similar to Brazil's highly successful Bolsa Familia and also the city runs the Cultura E program.

According to the city administration, Medellín Solidaria represents an improvement on Colombia's national program, 'Familias en Accion' (Families in Action). The city administration is further responsible for coordinating more than 100 other social programs. Under the Cultura E program, the city administration has established a network of 14 publicly funded business support centers known as CEDEZO, Centros de Desarrollo Empresarial Zonal). The CEDEZOs are found in the poorest areas of Medellín and support the poor in developing business by providing free-of-charge business support services and technical advice.

Also, as part of Cultura E, there is Banco de las Opportunidades that provides microloans (up to $2,500 at a cheap interest rate of 0.91% monthly). This has helped create more equal opportunities for all and overcome the barriers to entry to business for poor entrepreneurs with good ideas, but lacking capital, skills and connections. It has also helped develop the local economy with new micro-enterprises.

However, several mayoral candidates for the October 2011 elections have argued the Banco de las Opportunidades's interest rates are too high, loan maturity is too short and it should have grace periods. They, therefore, suggest a new small and medium-sized enterprise (SME) development bank to complement the Banco de las Opportunidades.

=== Crime ===
Medellín used to be considered one of the most dangerous cities in the world, a result of an urban war set off by the drug cartels at the end of the 1980s. However, its homicide rate has decreased by 95% and extreme poverty by 66%, thanks in part to a string of innovative mayors who laid out plans to integrate the poorest and most violent hillside neighborhoods into the city center in the valley below. Medellín is now considered safer than the U.S. cities of Baltimore, Memphis, St. Louis, Detroit, and New Orleans, which appear in the CCSPJP's top 50 list.

As the home of the Medellín Cartel funded by Pablo Escobar, the city was a victim of the terror caused by the war between the organization headed by Escobar, and competing organizations such as the "Cartel del Valle". However, after the death of Escobar in December 1993, crime rates in the city have decreased dramatically.

Throughout the rest of the 1990s crime rates remained relatively high, although gradually declining from the worst years. In October 2002, President Álvaro Uribe ordered the military to carry out "Operation Orion", the objective of which was to disband the urban militias of the FARC and the AUC. Between 2003 and 2006 the demobilization of the remaining urban militias of the AUC was completed, with more than 3,000 armed men giving up their weapons.

After the disbanding of the main paramilitary groups, some members briefly reorganized into criminal bands known commonly as Aguilas Negras ("Black Eagles"). These groups gained notoriety in Medellín for having called for curfews for the underage population, and having distributed fliers announcing the social cleansing of prostitutes, drug addicts, and alcoholics. In 2008 the extradition of paramilitary leader Don Berna caused a brief spark in crime wave and increase in killings.

There is a significant disparity in crime rates by neighborhoods, with virtually no homicides in El Poblado and Conquistadores and higher crime rates in the south west, around the airport and the north of the city. Generally, crime rates increase the further the neighborhood is from the center. From 2010 and 2011, homicides have declined as with crime in general, but there remains a high crime rate in the poorest communities.

3.2 percent of street addresses account for 97 percent of homicides. More than half of the violent deaths are attributed to clashes between criminal gangs in certain parts of the city. In 1991 there were 7,273 murders at a rate of 266 per 100,000 people; in 2017 had suffered 577 murders at a rate of 23 per 100,000 inhabitants. In the city there are more than 1,100 security cameras and more than 7,000 policemen.

In recent years, Medellín has experienced a rise in reported cases of foreign tourists being drugged and robbed, often involving substances such as scopolamine (burundanga) or benzodiazepines administered by criminal groups operating in nightlife districts like Parque Lleras. According to local authorities, hundreds of incidents occur annually, with victims typically rendered compliant and unable to recall events, leading to significant financial losses and, in some cases, serious medical complications or death. Police have launched targeted operations against networks involved in these drugging-robberies as tourism—particularly sex tourism—has expanded in the city, though officials emphasize that only a small minority of individuals in the sex industry participate in such crimes.

== Economy ==
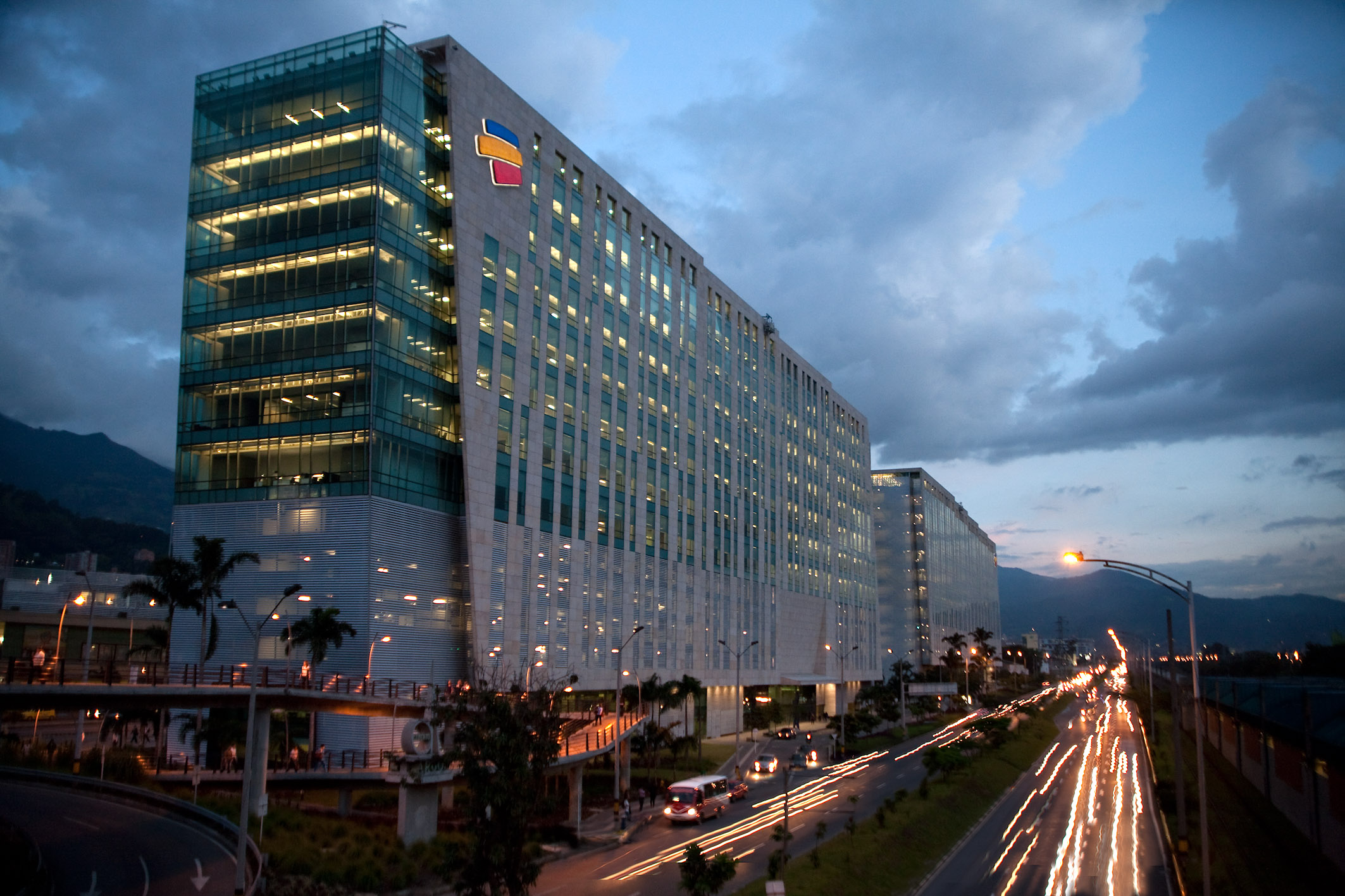
Headquarters of Bancolombia, the largest commercial bank in Colombia and one of the largest in Latin America, in Medellín

Medellín is Colombia's second most important economic center, after Bogotá. Its economy is led by a powerful group of people from the private sector known as the Grupo Empresarial Antioqueño (Antioquian Enterprises Group). The group was formerly known as the Sindicato Antioqueño (Antioquian Union) but after being mistaken abroad for a labor union, which hampered its international growth for many years, a new formal name was chosen. It is represented by David Bojanini, head of Grupo Suramericana (a banking, asset management and insurance conglomerate); Carlos Ignacio Gallego of Grupo Nutresa (food industry); José Alberto Velez of Cementos Argos (a multinational cement company); and Carlos Raúl Yepes, head of Bancolombia. This group has an aggregate market capitalization of approximately US$17 billion and employs more than 80,000 Colombians.

This group also participates in other sectors of the city industry and is an active trader in the Colombian stock exchange. Medellín serves as headquarters for many national and multinational companies.

Medellín's main economic products are steel, textiles, confections, food and beverage, agriculture (from its rural area), public services, chemical products, pharmaceuticals, refined oil, and flowers. Fashion is a major part of the economy and culture of the city. Medellín hosts Latin America's biggest fashion show, Colombiamoda.

Aerolínea de Antioquia has its headquarters on the grounds of Enrique Olaya Herrera Airport in Medellín. West Caribbean Airways had its headquarters on the grounds of Olaya Herrera Airport. ACES Colombia was headquartered in the city. Viva Air, a Colombian low-cost airline, has its hub at Rionegro's Airport.

=== Gross domestic product ===
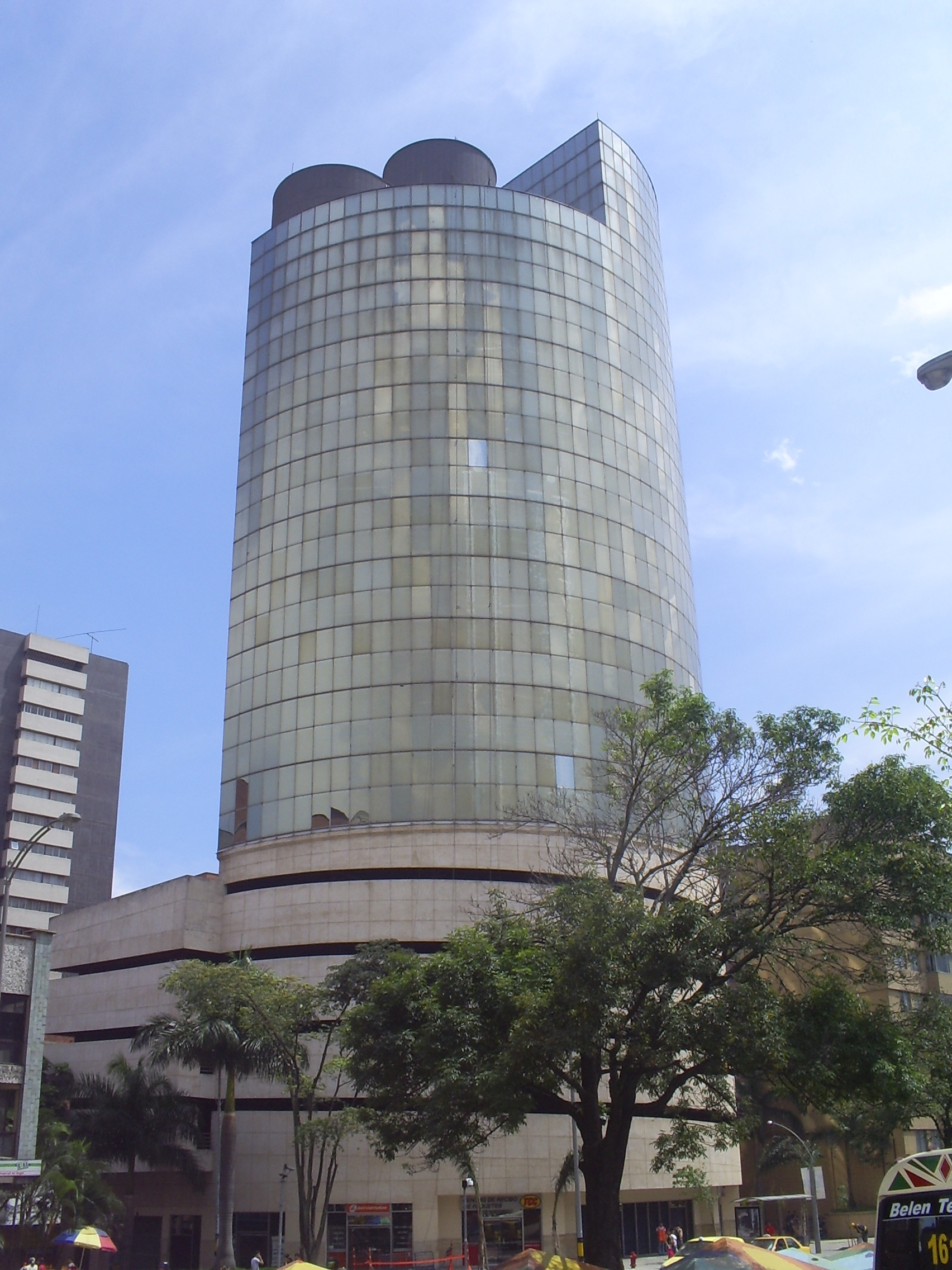
Former headquarters of Argos Company, the first cement industrial group of Colombia

The Metropolitan Area of Medellín contributes about 70% of the total GDP of the Department of Antioquia and a bit more than 10% of the economy of Colombia. By 2005, Antioquia's GDP was more than US$20,600,000,000 and the top exporting province in Colombia. The Aburrá Valley is the top economy in the department of Antioquia, and its GDP was US$14,500 million. Medellín is the second-largest economic region in Colombia, after Bogotá.

The 2005 Report of the Economic Colombian Review of Proexport and the International Cooperation Agency of Medellín concluded that Medellín was at the same level of GDP contribution to the national economy as cities like Panama City in Panama, and San José de Costa Rica.

=== Medellín Cluster ===
Medellín created the first Colombian business cluster. The city is the top exporting region of the country, with 1,750 export businesses based in Medellín. The Cluster was created with the support of the Chamber of Commerce of Medellín and the City Administration for an actual total of 21,000 companies that share 40% of total exports, 25% of the regional GDP, and 40% of Metro Area employment. The main economic activities of the Medellín Cluster (MC) are in electricity generation, textile, fashion design, construction, tourism and business. One goal of the Medellín Cluster is to include health services, an important sector in the local economy.

Ruta N is a non-profit in Medellín which helps foreign companies set up office in Medellín.

=== Unemployment and poverty ===
According to data released by the Measuring Monetary Poverty and Inequality Mission (Spanish: Misión para el Empalme de las Series de Empleo, Pobreza y Desigualdad, MESEP), in November 2009, the poverty rate in Medellín and its metropolitan area was reduced by 22.5%, from 49.7% to 38.5% during the period from 2002 to 2008. Similarly, the extreme poverty rate decreased by 25.2%, from 12.3% to 9.2%. These results are in line with the increased coverage of basic services such as health, education, and public services in the city. In 2014, the poverty rate decreased to 14.7% and extreme poverty to 2.8%.

The unemployment rate in Medellín and its metropolitan area, as has been the case in Colombia as a whole, has decreased in the past decade. According to data from the National Statistics Department (Spanish: Departamento Administrativo Nacional de Estadística, DANE) unemployment for Medellín and its Metropolitan Area was reduced by 25%, from 14.1%, just above the national average of 13.9% in 2005 to 10.6%, above the national average of 9.9%, in 2015. However, according to DANE, in 2014 Medellín stood out as one of the most unequal cities of Colombia, with a GINI coefficient of 0.506.

== Urban development ==
There are signs of heavy urban development within the city of Medellín, particularly with the construction of new skyscrapers. Medellín is outpacing all other major Colombian cities, including Bogotá, in the construction and proposed development of new high-rises. As of October 2016, there were 10 skyscrapers, 410 high-rises, 119 buildings under construction in Medellín, including 48 being planned. Other projects that the city has planned are extensions of the city's metro system to nearby suburbs such as Sabaneta. Under construction, the new project is set to open to the public soon.

Medellín was awarded 2013 "Innovative City of the Year" by The Wall Street Journal on 1 March after beating out New York City and Tel Aviv.

=== Libraries and library parks ===
A "library park" (Spanish: parque biblioteca) is a term first used in Medellín for an urban complex formed by a combination of a library building with ample surrounding green space for public use. These library parks are strategically located in the periphery of the city to address the need for more cultural and education space and public services in less affluent neighborhoods. The development of library complexes and schools is part of an effort at cultural transformation. This project also aims to create centralities inside the intervened areas that help consolidate and give a clearer identity to the communities. They are meant to provide a network of activity centers for the promotion of education, culture, sport, and recreation.

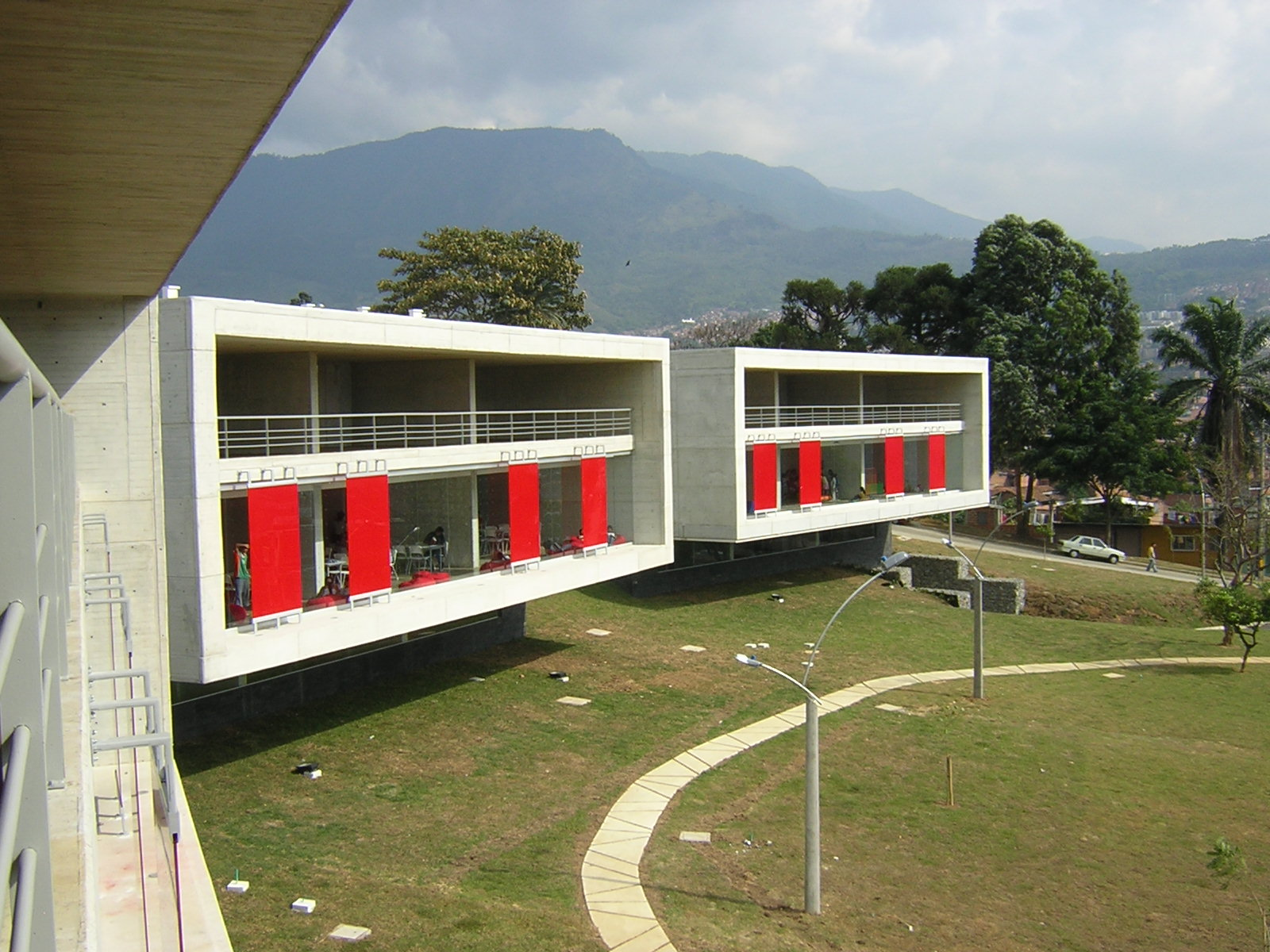
León de Greiff Library

The initial plan in 2009 built five libraries with attached parks to serve underprivileged neighborhoods. This development included the Biblioteca Parque España designed by Giancarlo Mazzanti, and which was named after Spain, who helped fund the construction of one of its buildings. Architects of the other libraries added as part of the program include Ricardo La Rotta Caballero and Hiroshi Naito. The four other libraries added were León de Greiff Library (also known as La Ladera Library Park), San Javier Library Park, Bethlehem Library Park, and La Quintana Library Park.

After the initial 2009 program another five libraries were added to the plan for 2011. These libraries are the Doce de Octubre Library Park for Comunas 5 and 6, Noroccidente; Las Estancias Library Park for Comunas 8, 9, and Centroriental; Parque Biblioteca Guayabal for Comuna 15 and Suroccidente; Parque Biblioteca San Cristóbal] for Corregimiento and Occidente; and Parque Biblioteca San Antonio de Prado for Corregimiento and Sur.

The idea of "library parks" has served as a model for library spaces in other countries, most notably the Manguinhos Library Park in Rio de Janeiro, Brazil.

The Medellín Metropolitan Area Library Network is a set of libraries linked together to share resources, efforts, knowledge and experience to improve the educational and cultural conditions of the community. The network consists of over 100 libraries, 29 of which reside in Medellín. The Library Network includes all of Medellín's library parks, as well as other regional libraries, such as the Public Pilot Library and the EPM Library.

The Library Network was a program created as a metropolitan agreement in 2005 thanks to an alliance of Empresas Públicas de Medellín, its EPM Foundation, the Mayor of Medellín, and the Pilot Public Library. In 2009, the Library Network was awarded the "Access to Learning Award" by the Bill & Melinda Gates Foundation, consisting of one million dollars to the EPM Foundation and the Library Network.

Additional libraries outside of this network include several other private, public, and university libraries.

=== Architecture ===
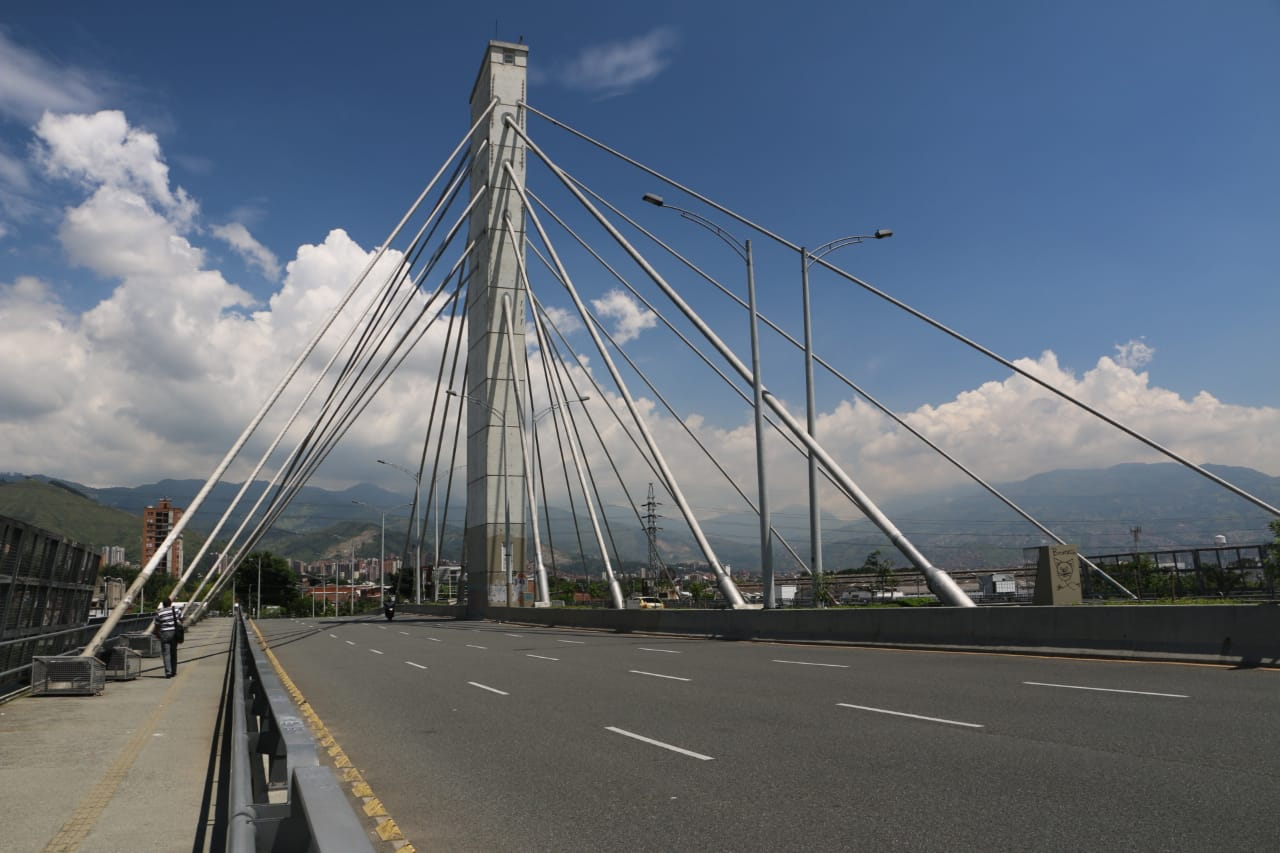
4 South Bridge, connects the south with the city's downtown.

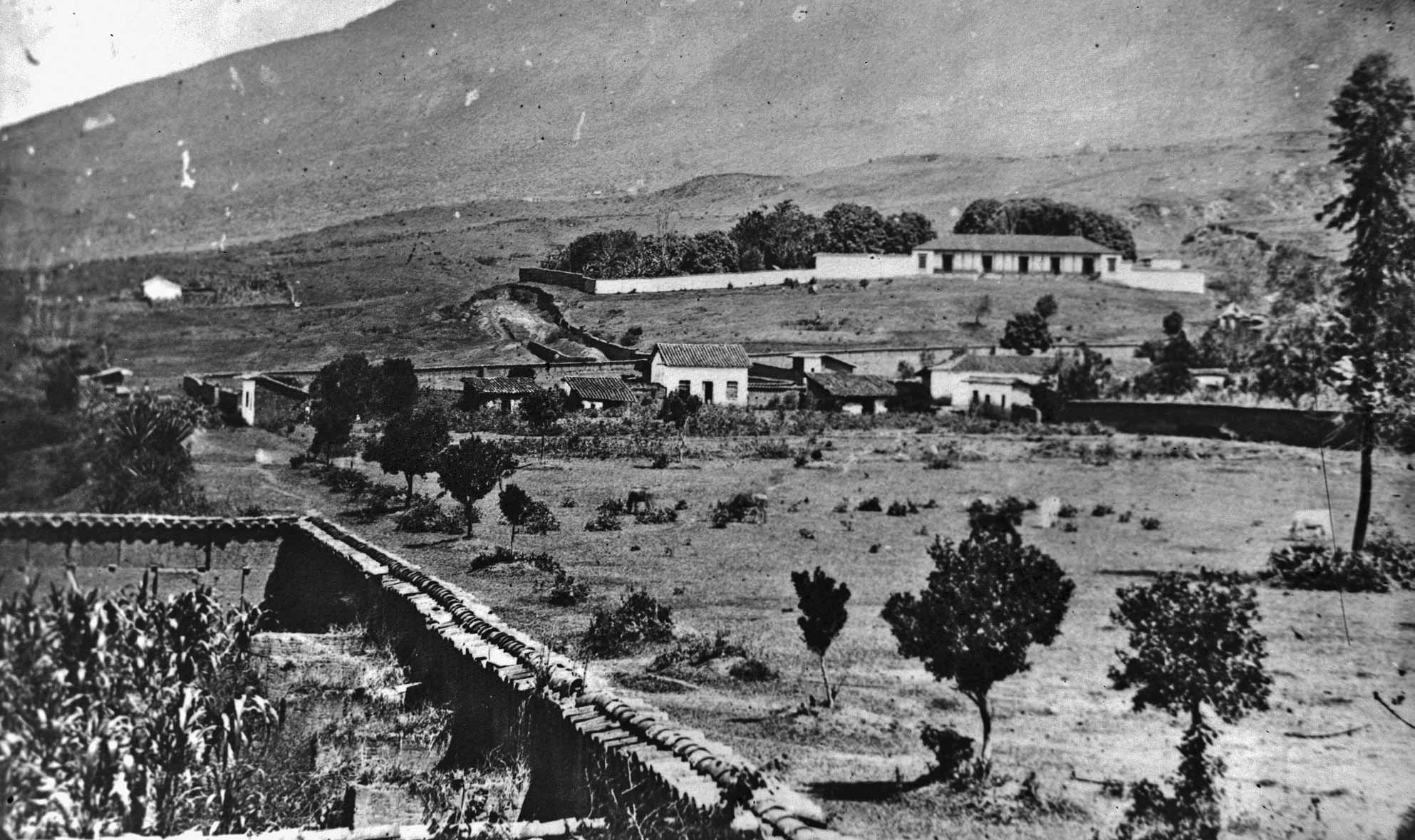
Former Villanueva Sector where the El Prado neighborhood is currently.

Medellín in 2013 won the Veronica Rudge Green Prize in Urban Design, awarded by Harvard University, due to PUI Integral Urban Project Northeast area, designed and implemented by Development Corporation Urbano. Medellín retains very little colonial architecture from the nineteenth century. Although the Aburrá Valley was a hotspot in agriculture and livestock throughout the colonial period, their relative wealth is not expressed in an outstanding and Cartagena, Tunja, Popayán and Bogotá civil and religious architecture. This can be explained by the fact that the population of Medellín was not political and administrative center and a place geographically isolated whose elite invested little in the development of monumental architecture. From the end of the colony remain, but with many transformations, the Candelaria Church and the Church of the Veracruz.

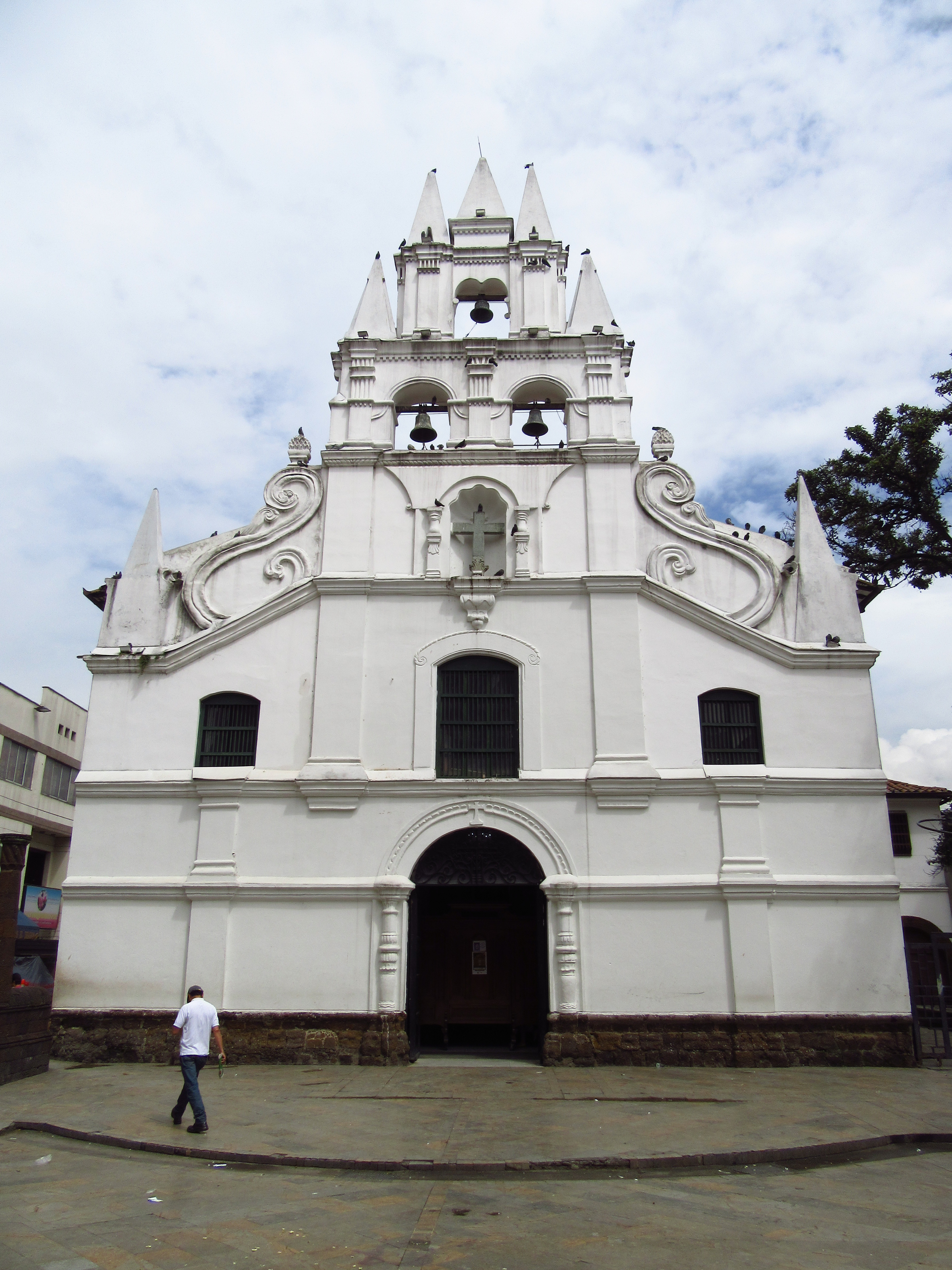
The Church of the Veracruz remains, but with many transformations, from the end of the colonial period.

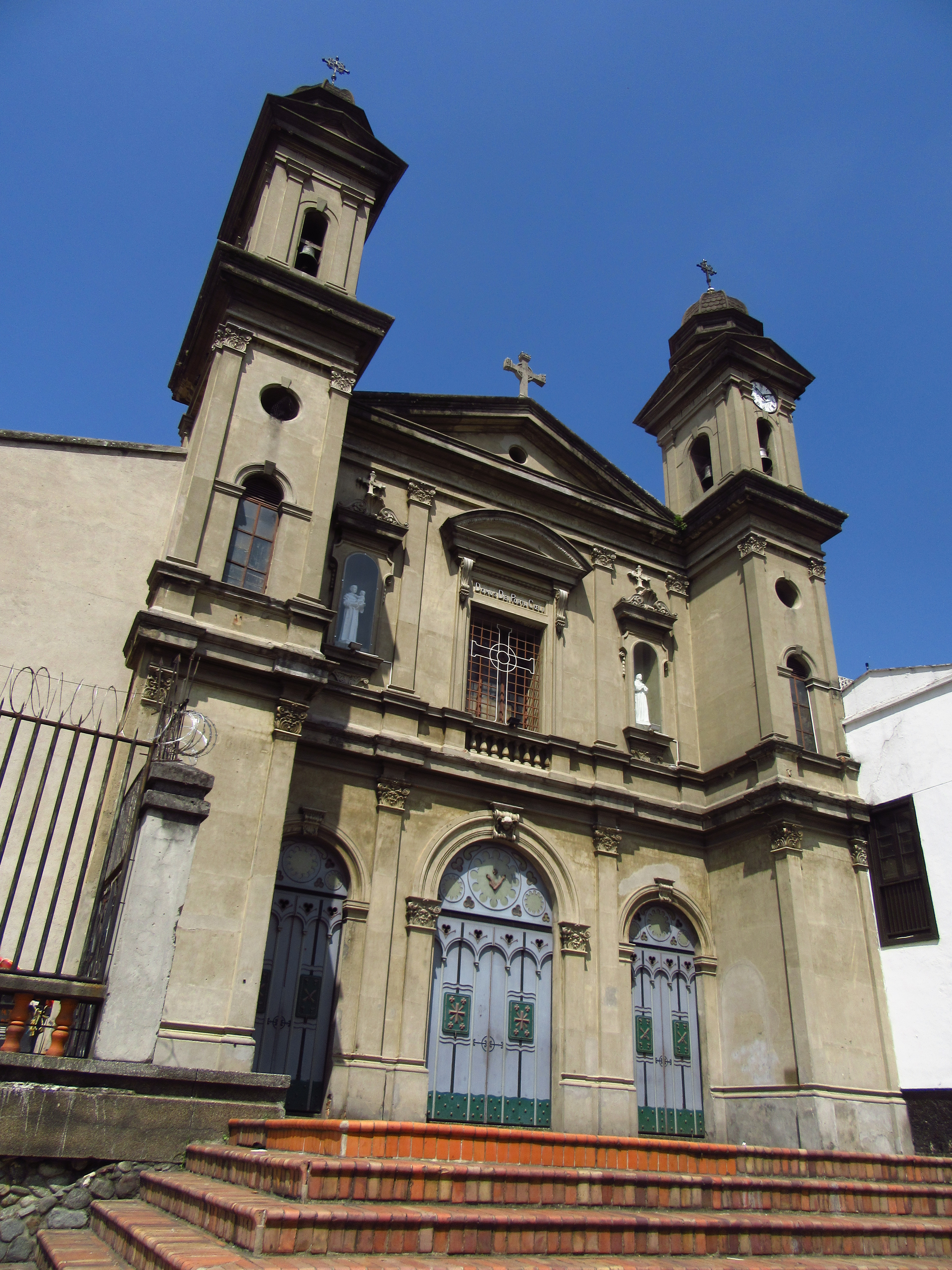
San Antonio Church

The architecture produced in Colombia between 1850 and 1930 is called "Republican". The use of brick and implementation of European historical styles were the main novelty. Enrique Haeusler designed the Guayaquil Bridge in 1879. But it was the French architect Carlos Carré who headlined Republican nineteenth century architecture in Medellín. Carré came to town in 1889 and was hired to design and build the new Episcopal Cathedral and several commercial and residential buildings for different parts of the city, especially in the new neighborhood of Guayaquil. The Metropolitan Cathedral was completed in 1931; also are of authorship Vásquez and Carré buildings, which are located next to Plaza Cisneros. The Medellín Antioquia Railway Station was the work of Enrique Olarte, a work that allowed the definitive urban consolidation in Guayaquil sector. In the twenties Republican architecture reached its peak phase. In this period stand the old Municipal Palace (now the Museum of Antioquia) in 1928, the National Palace and the Palace of Departmental Government (now the Palace of Culture) between 1925 and 1928. The latter two works were designed by the Belgian architect Agustín Goovaerts, both inspired by the Belgian modernist, it applied the Romanesque and Gothic styles respectively. Other works of Goovaerts were the Church of the Sacred Heart (sector Guayaquil), the Church of San Ignacio, among others. The thirties highlighted such constructions of the Prado neighborhood as the Egyptian house and the current Teatro Prado.

=== Parks ===
The main parks of the city include Berrío Park in the center of the city; Bolívar Park, a little further north and framed by the Metropolitan Cathedral; and others in more residential areas like Bethlehem Park, El Poblado Park, and Laureles Park. Several modern parks are interactive and have had a positive reception from the people because they are not only places of recreation but also of education. These include Barefoot Park, Wishes Park, Explora Park, and Bicentennial Park (which was recently opened to mark the bicentenary of Colombia).

One of the most visited sites is the Arví Ecotourism Park, which has an area of about 20,000 hectares located between the towns of Medellín, Bello, Copacabana, and Envigado. In its trails, lakes, forests and streams, one can practice various sports and activities like trekking, kayaking, biking, camping, fishing, swimming, sailing rowing, horseback riding, bike tours and picnics. Its promontory position over Medellín offers natural landscapes overlooking over the entire city.

The city is surrounded from above by seven hills, which serve as natural viewpoints of the city and are sites for healthy leisure, recreation, enjoyment, research, sport, culture, education and ecotourism. The hills are El Volador, La Asomadera, Nutibara, Pan de Azúcar, El Salvador, El Picacho and Santo Domingo. In these natural public spaces one can find viewpoints, pre-Hispanic roads, religious icons, culture and Antioquian traditions, bird watching, the most complete herbal living of Aburrá Valley and the very few, if any, remains of early settlers native of Medellín, among other attractions.

Other parks in the city include North Park and Juan Pablo II Park. The Santa Fe Zoo, founded in 1960, has about 1,000 animals from Asia, Africa, and the Americas.

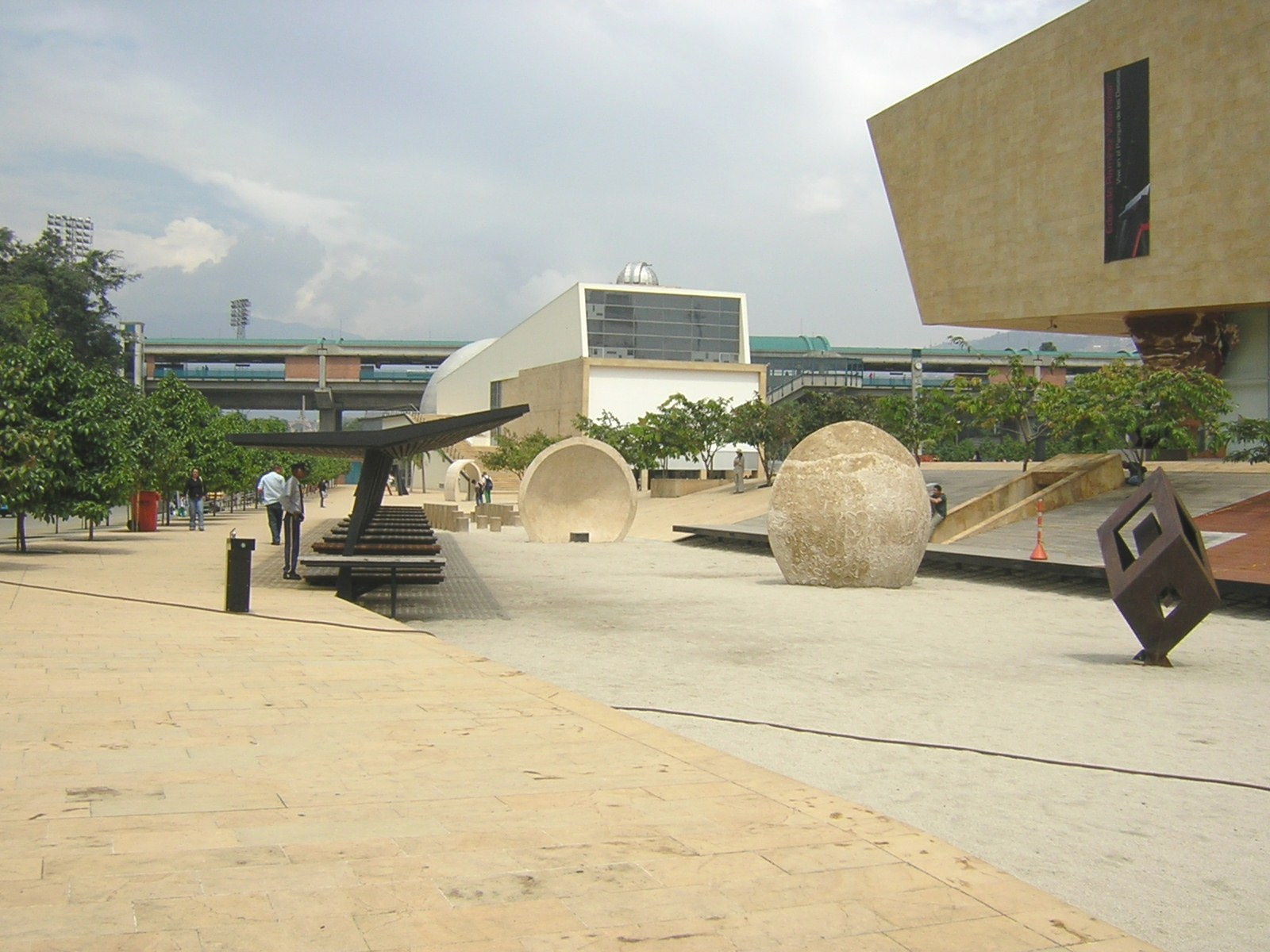
Wishes Park

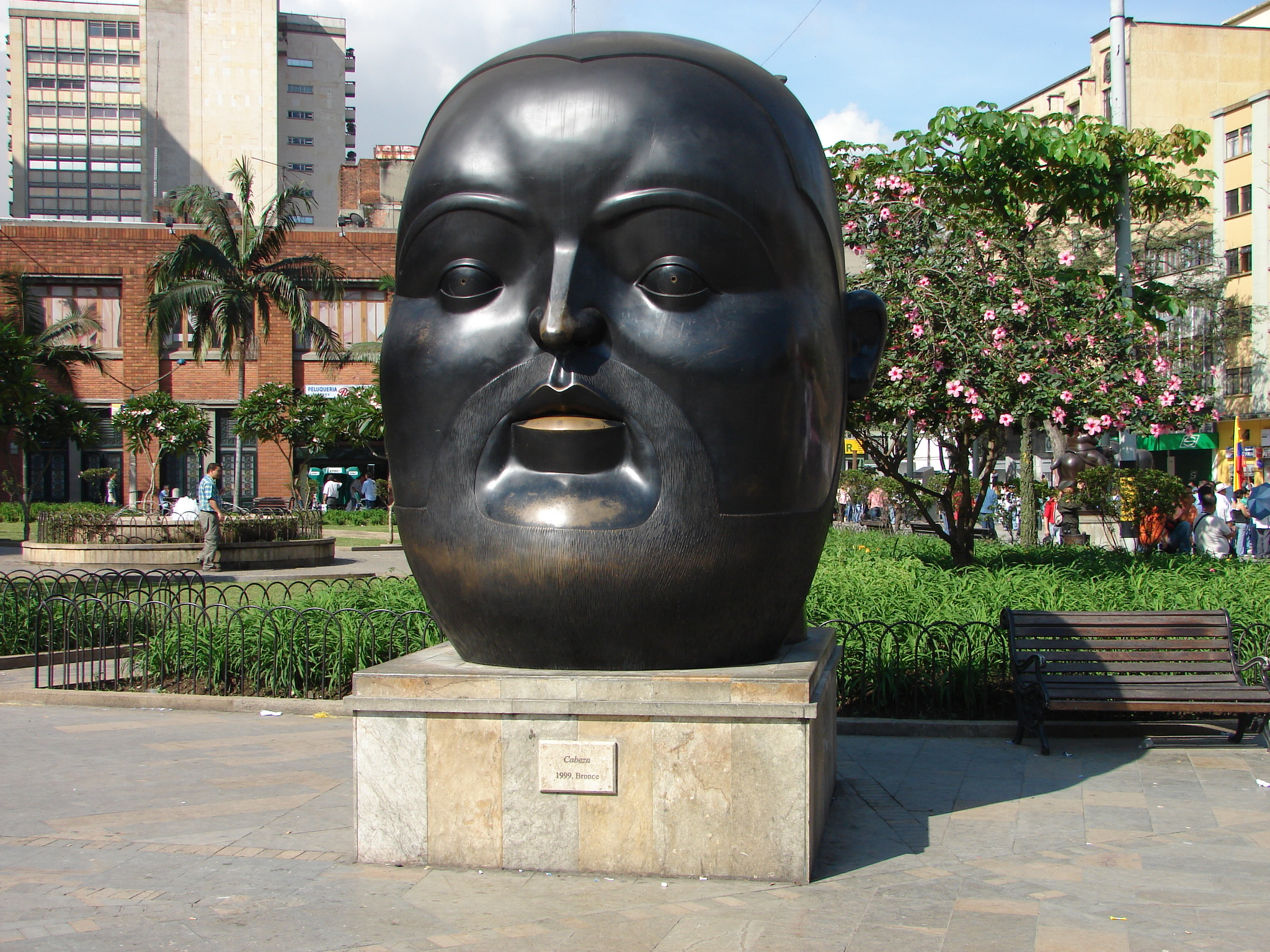
Botero Plaza

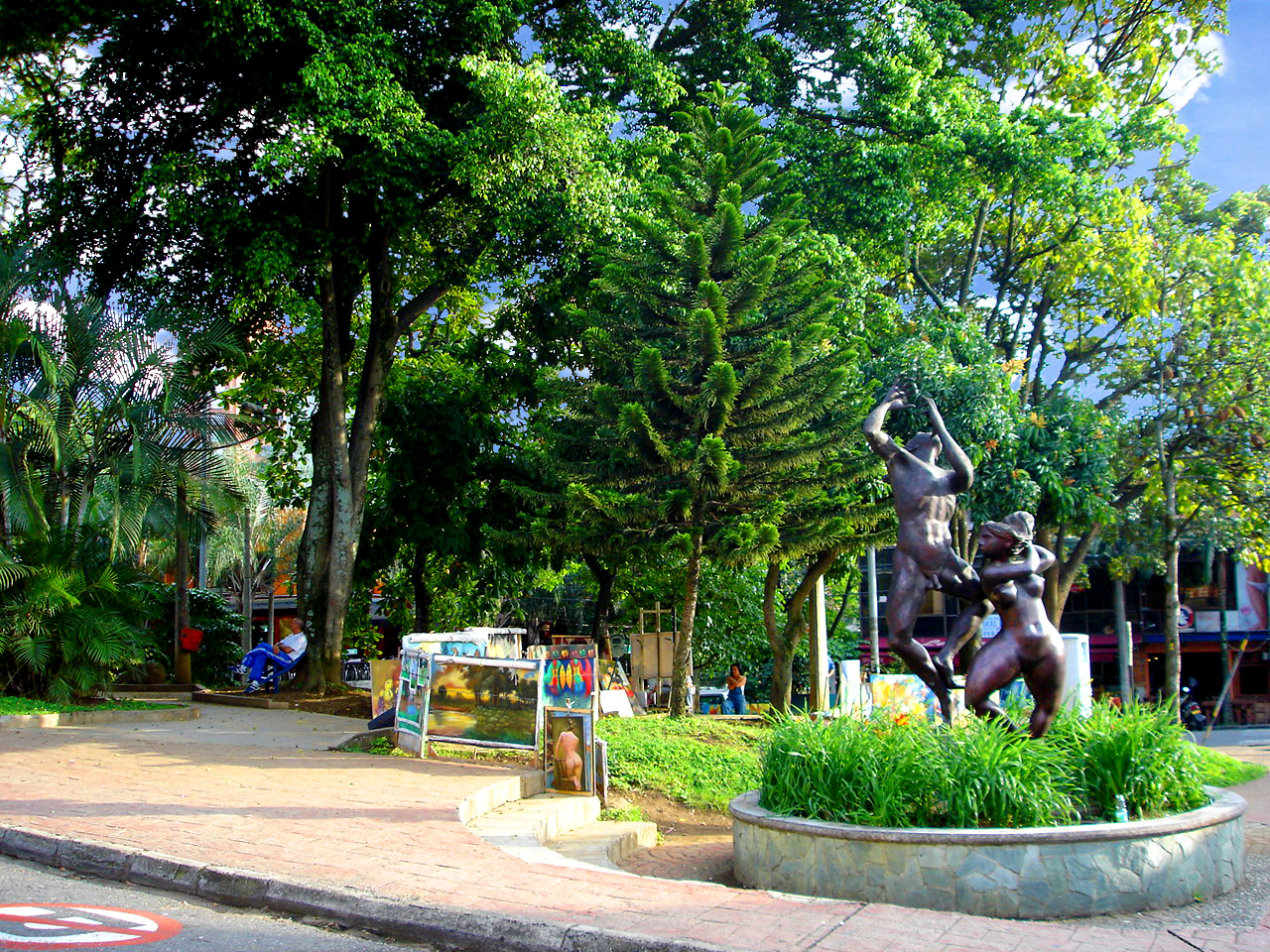
Parque Lleras

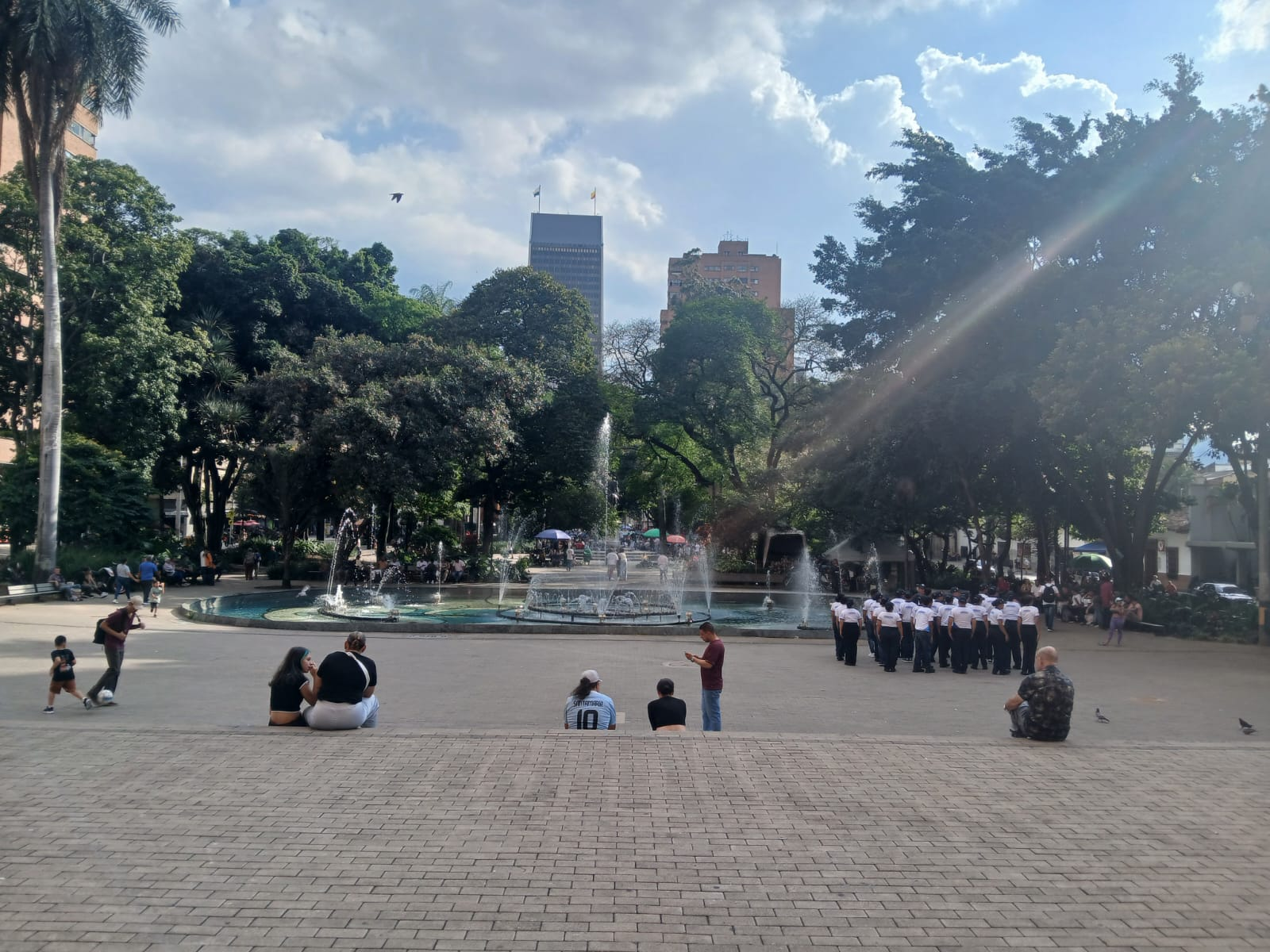
Bolívar Park

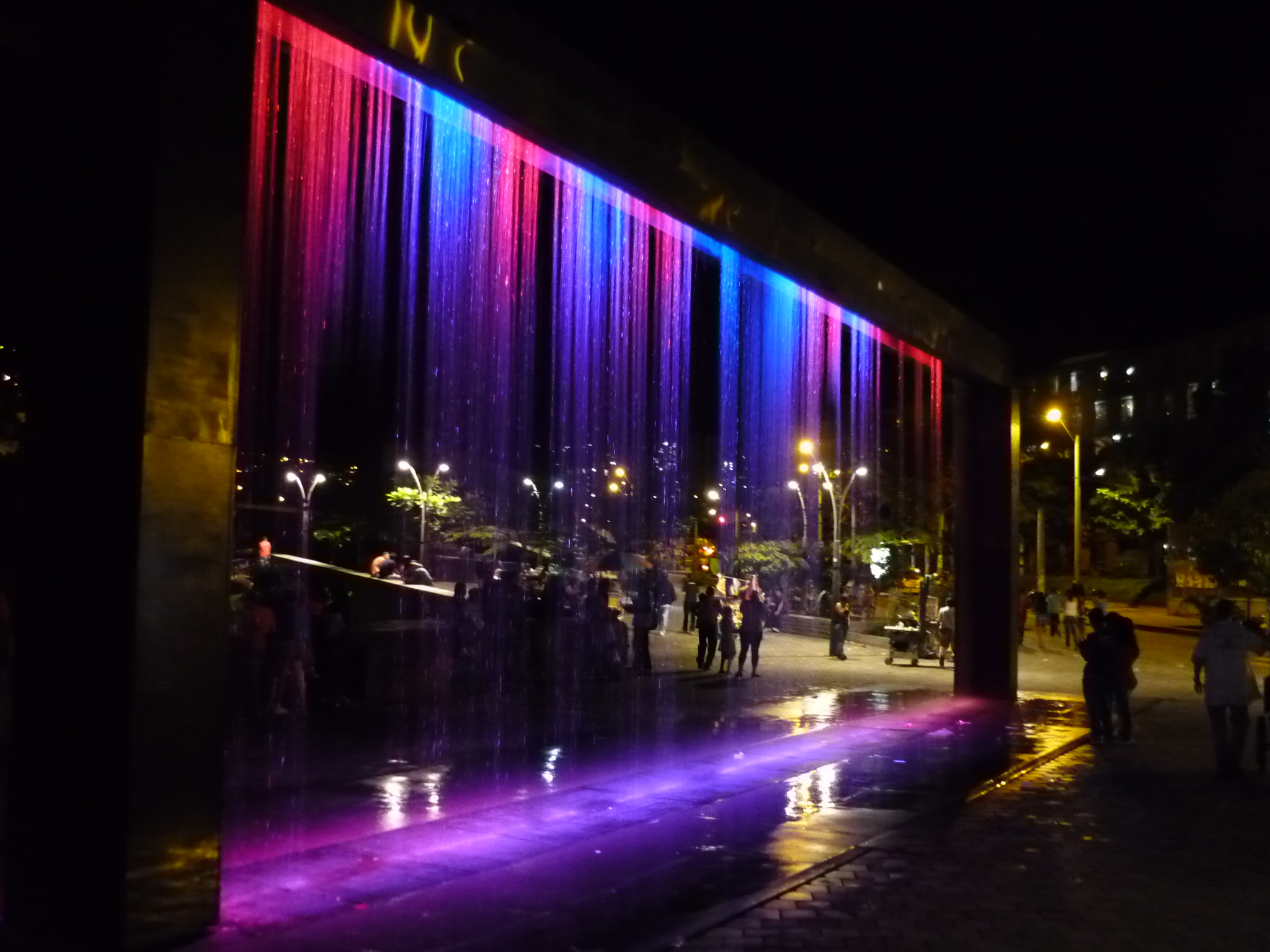
Bicentennial Park

=== Plazas and plazuelas ===
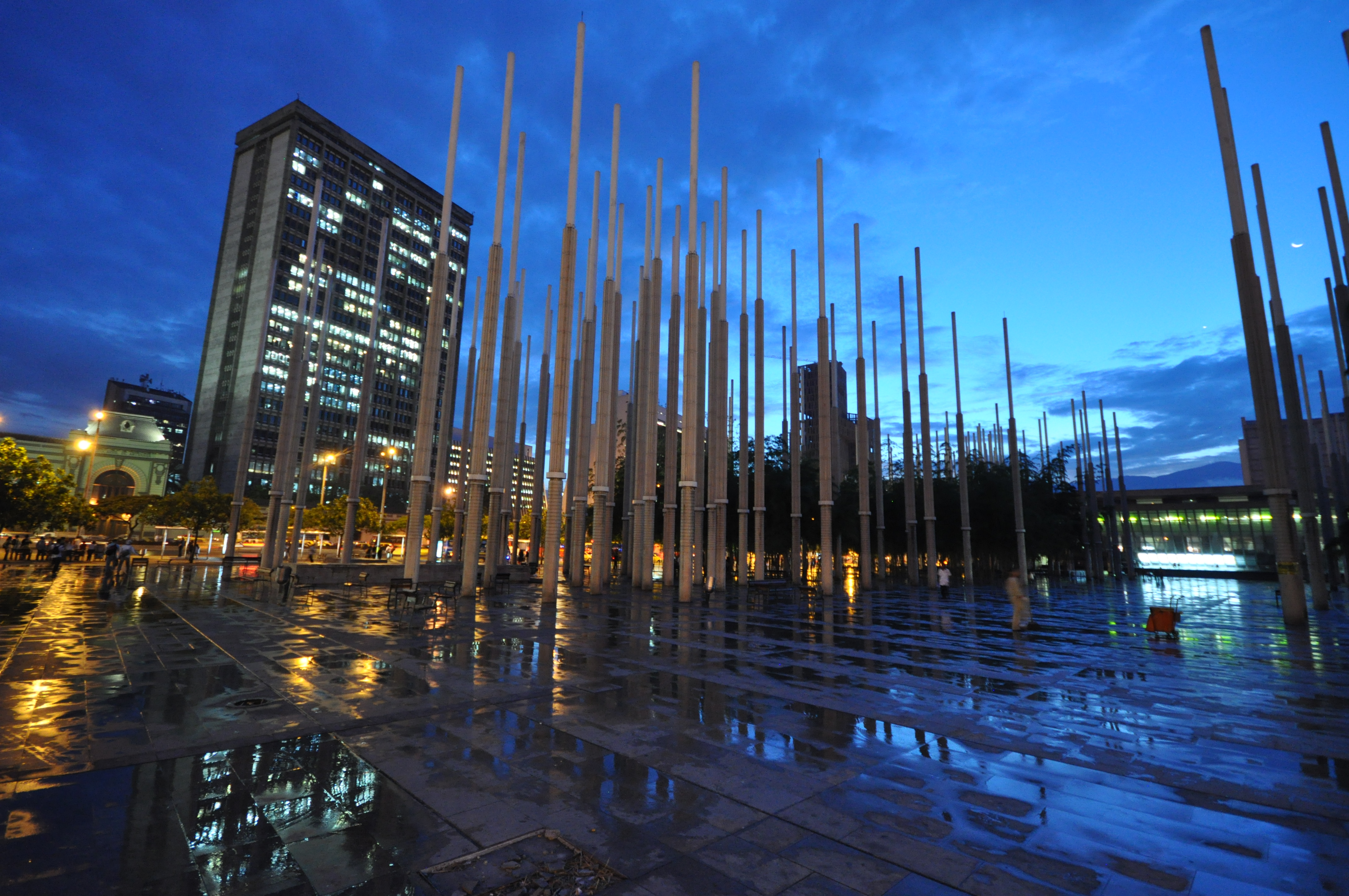
Plaza Cisneros

- Plaza Cisneros: Located between the EPM Library and the Vásquez and Carre Buildings. It has a forest of light poles, 24 meters (79 feet) high. There are 300 posts with 2100 reflectors (seven per tower) and 170 lamps floor. These elements are mixed in turn with bamboo and water sources. It is a kind of artificial forest, with open spaces for encounters and large crowds.
- Botero Plaza: Launched in 2002, is located in front of the main façade of the Museum of Antioquia. It has 7,000 m^{2} (75,347 sq ft), in which are exhibited permanently in the public space, 23 monumental sculptures by Fernando Botero. Attila addition to receiving the prize, awarded the magazine Documents National and American Architecture (Dana), of Argentina, and gave as winners of its 2003 Award Attila Medellín Mayor Luis Perez and former director of Heritage of the Ministry of Culture, Konrad Brunner, considering that they were directly responsible for the demolition of Pasaje Sucre, in Medellín.
- Zea Plazuela: Dates from the late nineteenth century and still has some houses with original architecture, also called the Square of Francisco Antonio Zea. In 1932, when the sculptor Marco Tobon Mejia developed sculpture Francisco Antonio Zea. Not until the early 1950s would the place acquire modern features.
- Freedom Square: Located in the La Alpujarra, it is under construction and will have an area of 70,000 m^{2} (753,474 sq ft) and will include government and private agencies. It is designed as a public plaza open to recreation. It will be a center of convergence and coordination of the main activities and pedestrian flows that develop in the administrative and cultural sector of the city.
- Plazuela Nutibara: historical and representative of the city site. Its surroundings are located traditional buildings that have been listed as heritage of the city: the Palace of Culture, one of the most valuable architectural buildings; ancient seat of the government of Antioquia; and Nutibara Hotel. It is also located there Cacique Nutibara source, the work of Master Pedro Nel Gómez. It is adjacent to Plaza Botero.
- Plazuela San Ignacio: Traditional place of the city, on its eastern flank three historical buildings, the San Ignacio historic headquarters building of the University of Antioquia are located; the San Ignacio Church a jewel of baroque and neoclassical Cloister San Ignacio or Republican style and abroad with Gothic elements in the interior. In the square are the statue of General Francisco de Paula Santander, the bust of Marceliano Vélez and the monument to the centenary of the University of Antioquia.
- Plazuela de La Veracruz: Here is located the Church of La Veracruz which gives its name to the Plazuela. It has a bronze fountain and marble monument, a tribute to the hero of independence Atanasio Girardot.

== Health ==
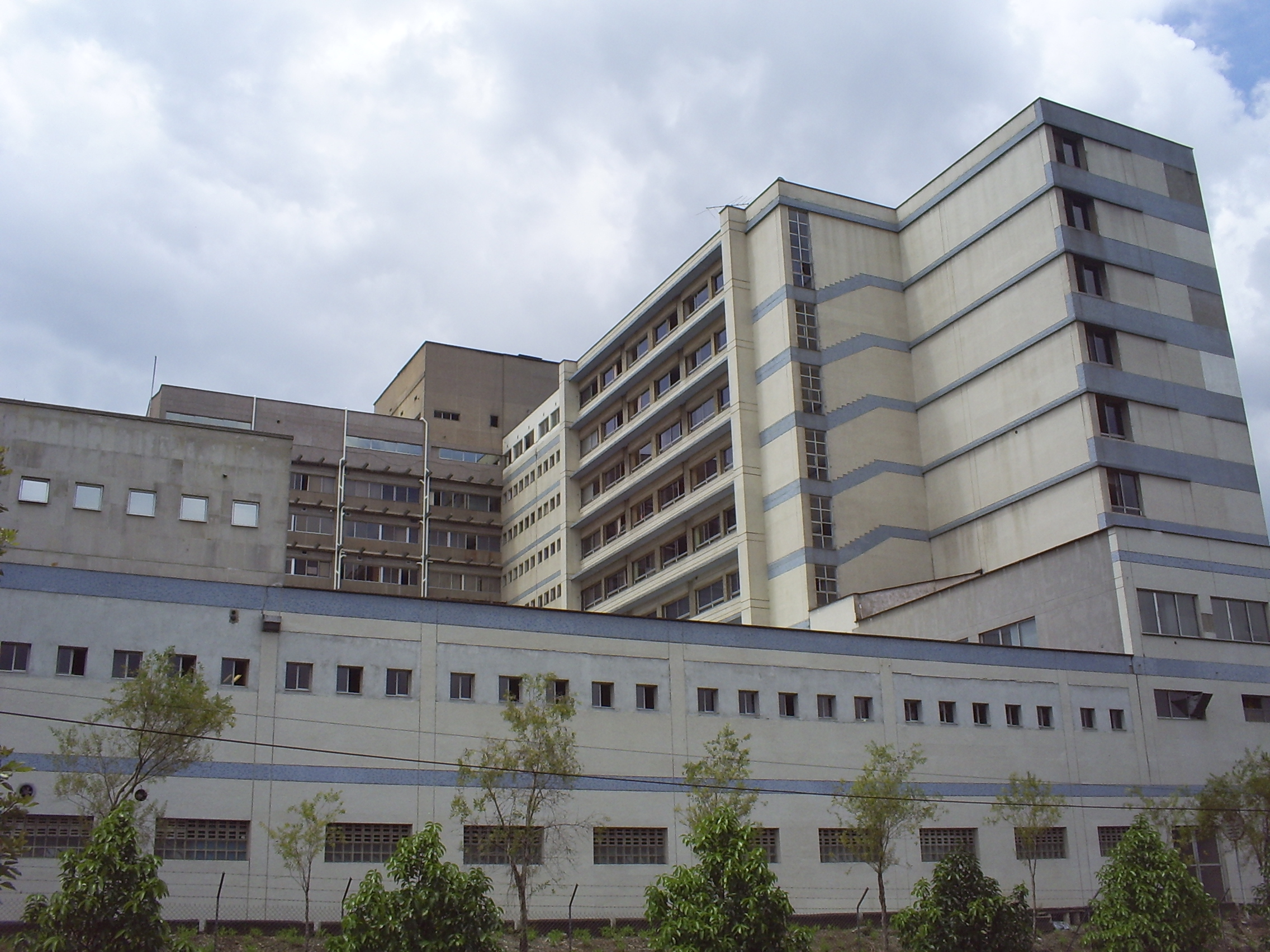
Pablo Tobón Uribe Hospital is the top ranked hospital in the city.

Medellín is considered a top research city in medicine in Colombia, being an exponent of advanced surgical operations in the country and Latin America. Health clinics and dental centers in Medellín have become pioneers in offering high quality services in several medical areas. The University Hospital San Vicente de Paul, the Pablo Tobon Uribe Hospital, and Clinical Cardiovascular Santa Maria have received national and international recognition as pioneers in organ transplantation.

América Economía magazine ranked Medellín as having eight of the top 100 hospitals and clinics in Latin America. Its highest ranked hospital was Pablo Tobon Uribe Hospital, which ranked in seventh place in 2014. The Pablo Tobon Uribe Hospital is non-profit and private.

Specialized health centers such as San Vicente Foundation hospitals were recognized with the Silver Category of LEED certification. This is the only hospital outside of the United States of America to obtain this certification.

Among the most recognized universities with notable research work in medicine are the University of Antioquia, CES University, and UPB University.

Air pollution caused more than 7,000 deaths in 2016 in the city and represents a significant financial cost due to the treatment of respiratory diseases.

== Education ==
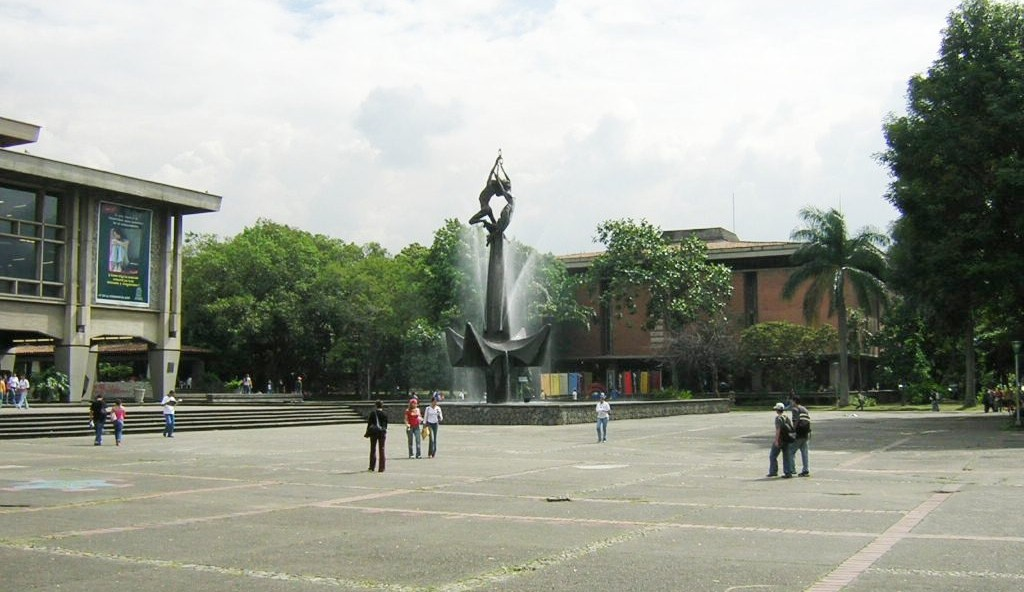
Central Square, University of Antioquia

Medellín is also home to over 30 universities. Among the most important public universities are the following:

- University of Antioquia
- National University of Colombia
- Pontifical Bolivarian University
- EAFIT University
- University of Medellín
- University of San Buenaventura
- Engineering School of Antioquia
- Saint Thomas Aquinas University
- National Training Service
- CES University
- Universidad Nacional Abierta y a Distancia
- Remington University Corporation
- Fundación Universitaria CEIPA
- Colegiatura Colombiana

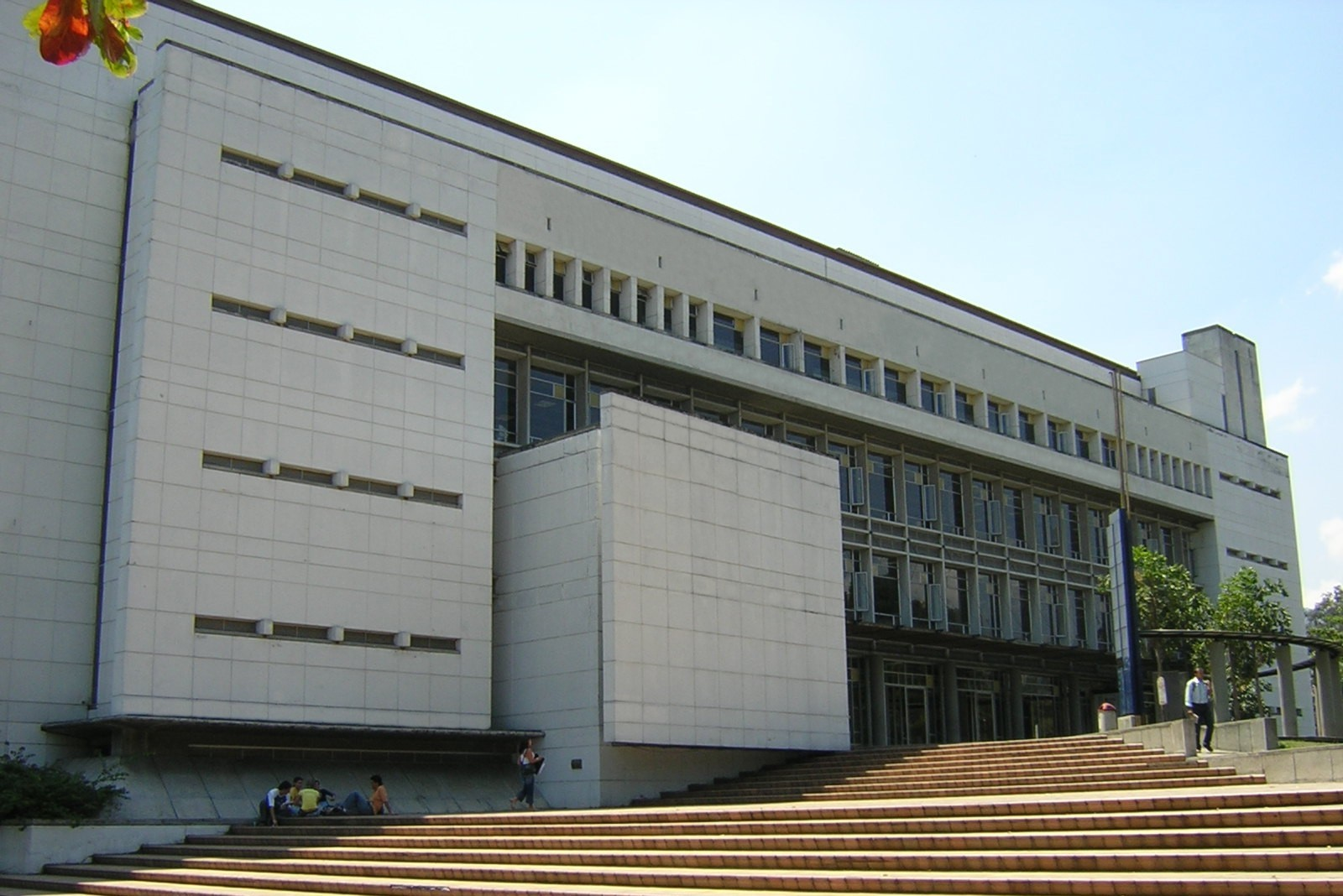
Central Library of Pontifical Bolivarian University

There are also important technological centers such as the Metropolitan Institute of Technology (ITM), Jaime Isaza Cadavid's Politecnico, and Antioquia Institute of Technology.

During the last decade, the administration of the city has emphasized public education, building schools and libraries in poor quarters. Private schools and colleges have a long tradition in the city, many run by the Catholic Church, private organizations, and foreign institutions. Among them are Gimnasio Internacional de Medellín, The Columbus School (the only SACS-approved school in the city), Theodoro Hertzl School, St. Ignatius Loyola College, Colegio Calasanz, Colegio Colombo Britanico, El Corazonista School, Marymount School, Montemayor Sagrado Corazon, Montessori School, Colegio Fontán, Gimnasio Los Pinares, Gimnasio Los Alcázares, San Jose de la Salle, Instituto Jorge Robledo, the Salesian Technical School Pedro Justo Berrío, Colegio Cumbres, Colegio San Marcos, Lycee Français Medellín, Liceo Salazar y Herrera, and 'El Sufragio' Salesian School.

Many non-governmental organizations and official organizations support the development of children and youth from poor communities. Ciudad Don Bosco cares for street children. The pacification of the city brought organizations to the poorest quarters to work with youth involved in urban violence, in order to improve their opportunities. Medellín universities, public and private, also played a role, along with official institutions both local and national.

== Transportation ==
=== Air transportation ===
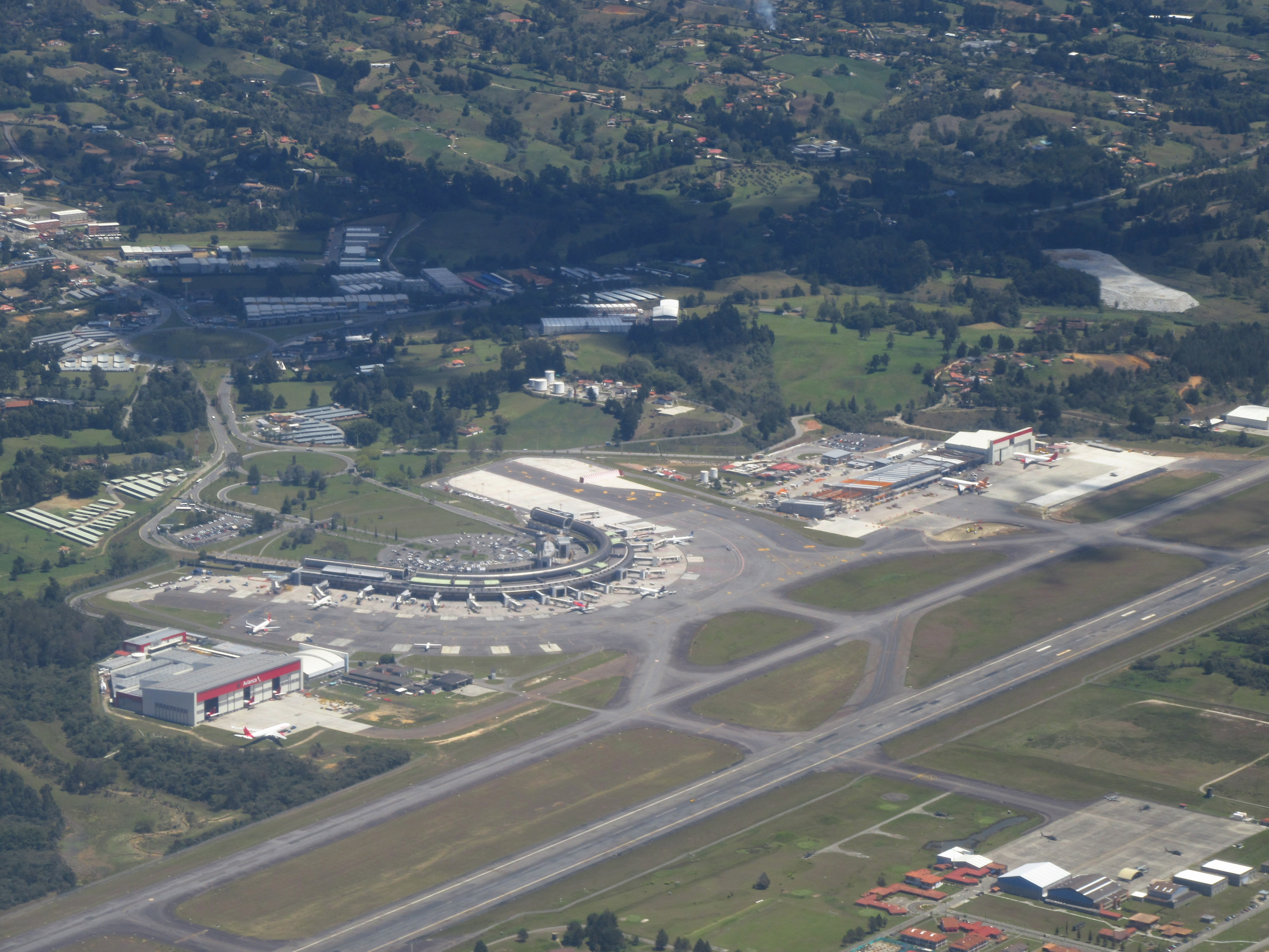
José María Córdova International Airport

Medellín has two airports, Olaya Herrera Airport (EOH), and José María Córdova Airport (MDE), which is located in the city of Rionegro, 29 kilometers (18 miles) east of the city of Medellín. In 2012 the busiest domestic flight route was between Jose Maria Cordova Airport and Bogotá while the busiest international route was between Jose Maria Cordova Airport and Panama City.

The Jose Maria Cordova Airport receives international flights from important carriers such as Aeromexico, American Airlines, Avianca, Iberia, JetBlue, Spirit Airlines, United Airlines, Air Europa, and LATAM Airlines and cargo airlines such as Fed Ex Express, which makes the city accessible from the many regions of America, both for passengers and cargo customers. Avianca, the flag air-carrier of Colombia, has also an important activity at this airport. This airport has direct flights to important international destinations such as Lima, Quito, Mexico City, Madrid, Miami, Houston, and New York City.

=== Land transportation ===
Medellín has two transportation terminals, the North Transportation Terminal and the South Transportation Terminal. The city's public transport system includes diesel buses, taxis, tram and an urban train referred to as the Medellín Metro, the only metro system in Colombia.

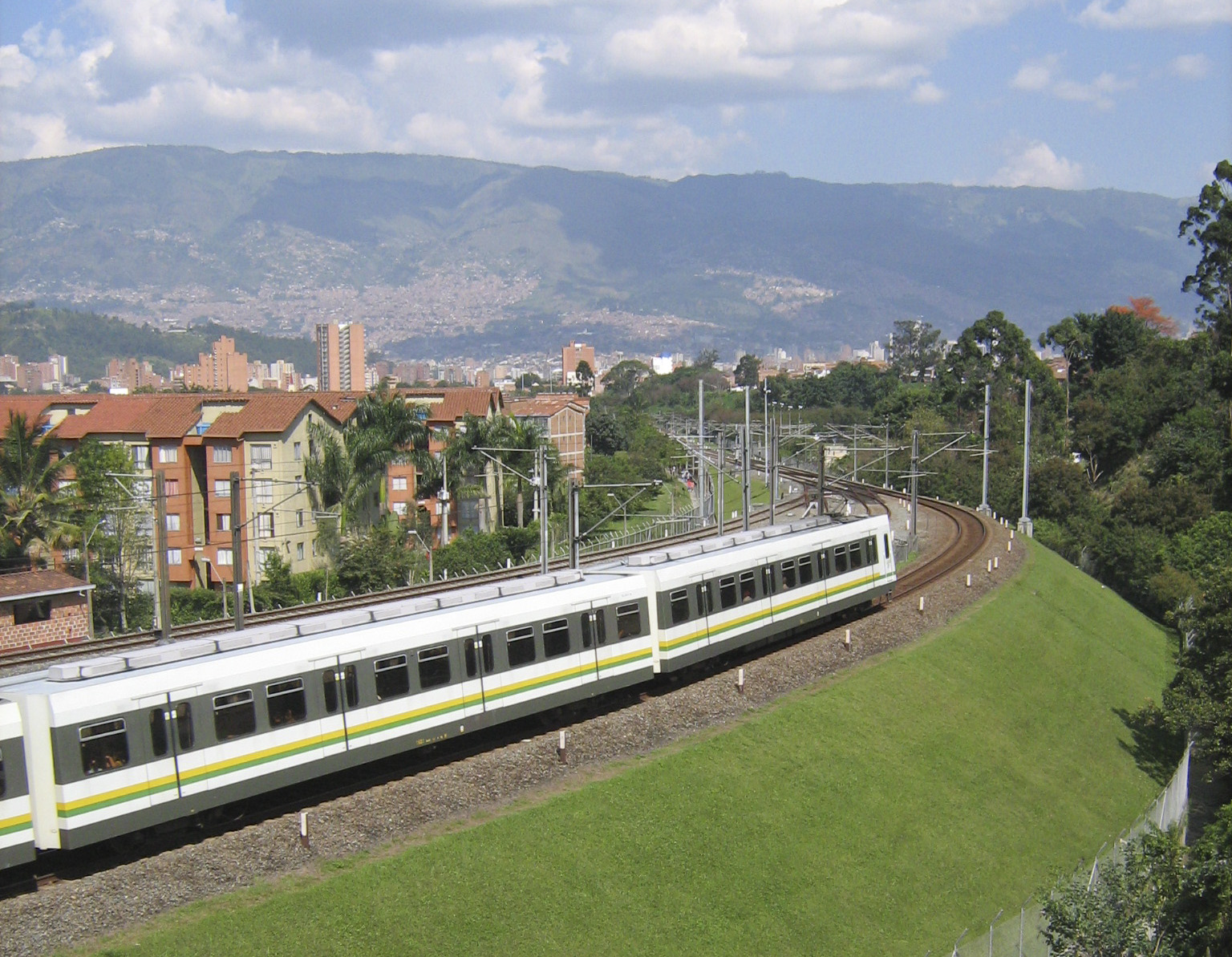
Medellín Metro is the only metro system in Colombia.

The Metro connects the city with most of its metropolitan area. It has five lines. Line A goes from Niquía to La Estrella (north to south), while Line B goes from San Antonio to San Javier (downtown to west). In addition, Line K and Line J, an air cable car, locally known as Metrocable, serve a depressed and geographically difficult area. Line K begins at Acevedo Station on Metro Line A, and continues uphill, ending at Santo Domingo Savio. Line J begins at San Javier Station on Metro Line B, and continues uphill to La Aurora. Line L does not serve communal areas, rather, it is a tourist-oriented line which is connected to Arví Park and is part of a social project to bring retreats and nature to the masses. Colombia has become Latin America's largest user of such complementary transportation service throughout the country.

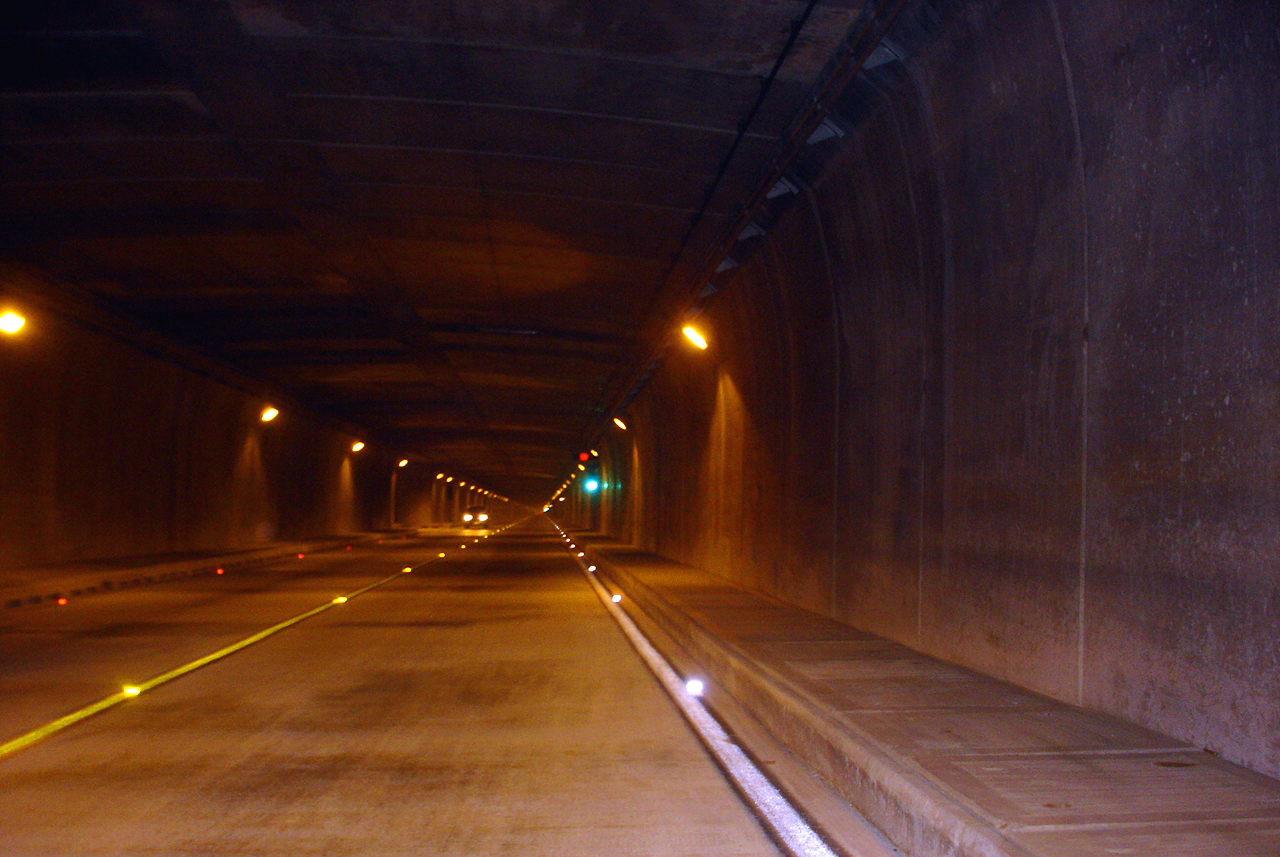
Western Tunnel, the longest tunnel in Latin America

In 2006, construction began on Metroplús, a bus rapid transit service with a dedicated road, much like Bogotá's TransMilenio, to allow faster transit for the service's buses. The first line opened two years later than planned in 2011 and a second in 2013. The first leg is the Troncal Medellín, which goes from the Universidad de Medellín in the west to Aranjuez in the northeast part of the city. Metroplus will help lessen the city's pollution and traffic, as many old buses will be taken out of service, while the new buses will work with natural gas.

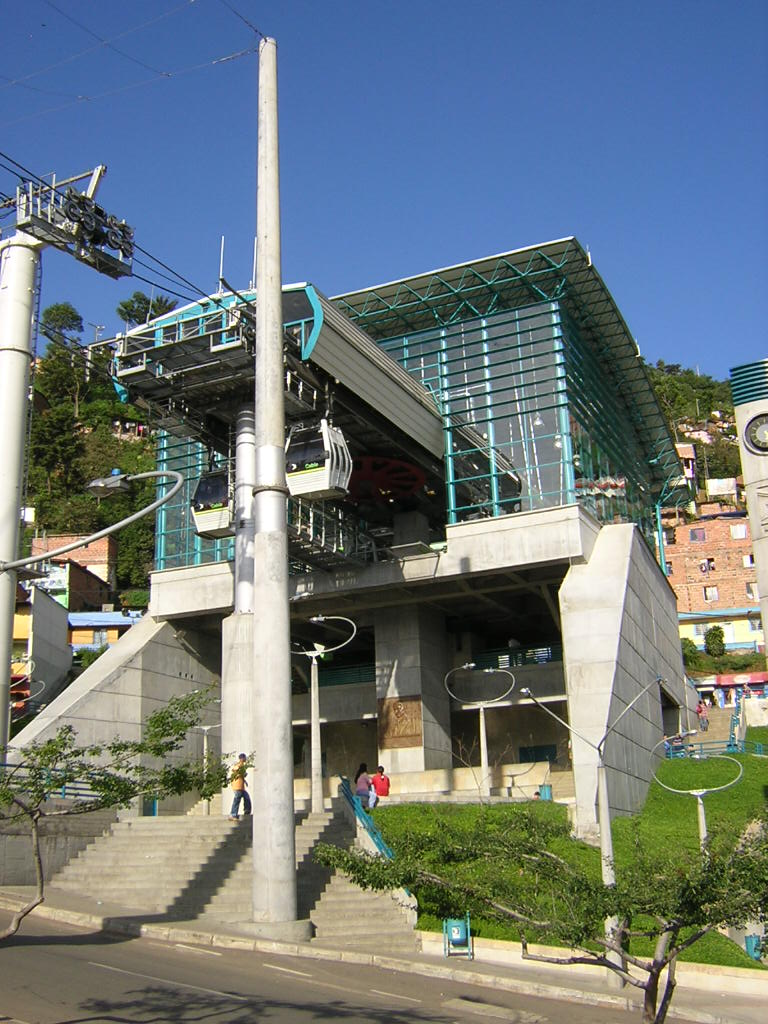
Medellín's Metrocable at Santo Domingo Savio station

Because of its projects on sustainable transport, the city obtained, along with San Francisco, the 2012 Sustainable Transport Award, given by the Institute for Transport and Development Policy. According to EMBARQ Director Holger Dalkmann, "Medellín pioneered the use of cable cars as a transit alternative in low-income informal settlements in hilly areas, moving 3,000 passengers per hour per direction; a real breakthrough now being replicated in Caracas and Rio de Janeiro,"

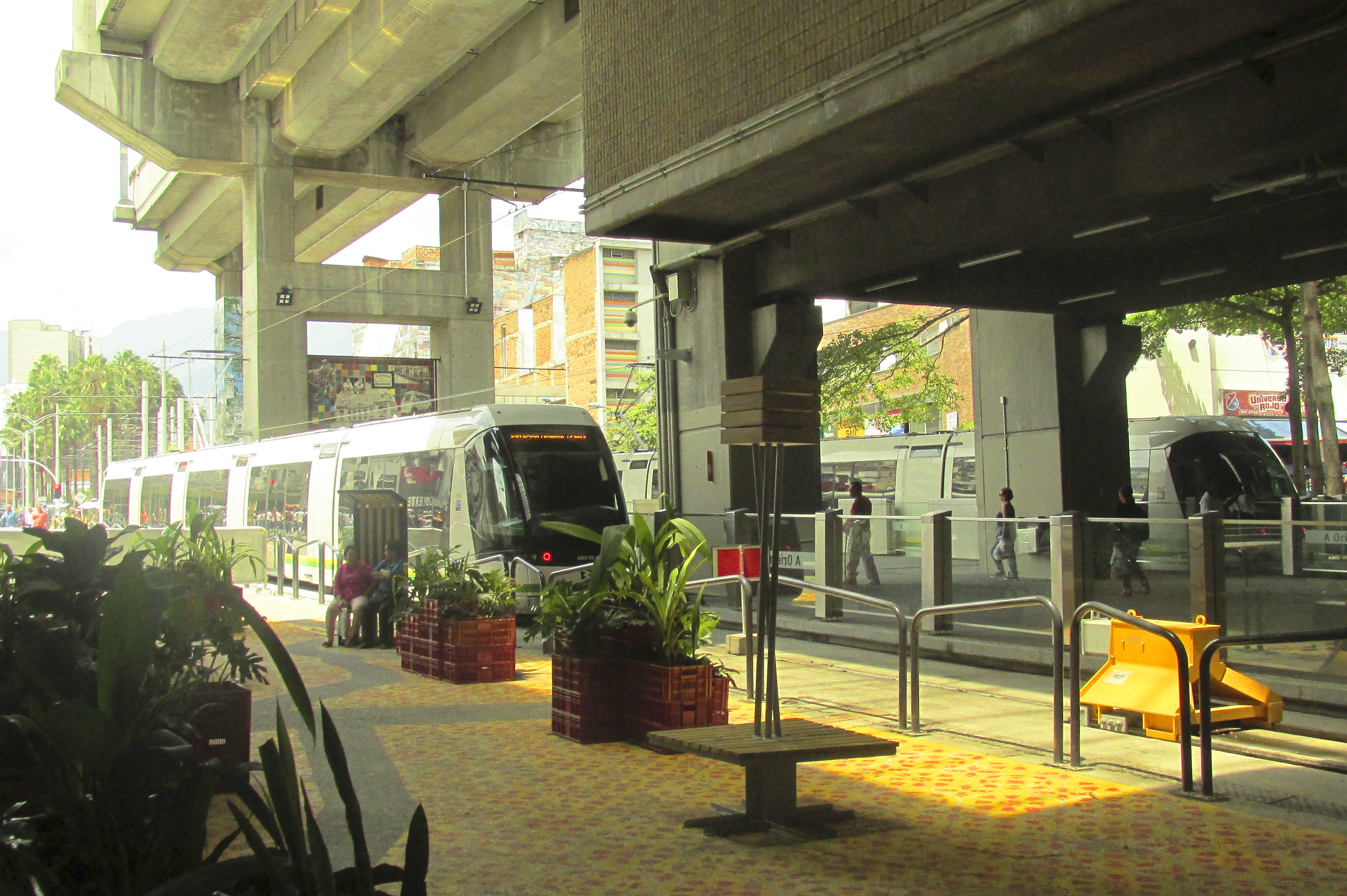
Trams returned to Medellín in 2015 after an absence of 64 years.

The Colombia and Latin America's second-largest and most modern tunnel, the Western Tunnel, officially named the Fernando Gomez Martinez Tunnel, is located between Medellín and Santa Fe de Antioquia. It is 4.6 km (3 mi) in length and offers security and service technologies for the users. It was inaugurated on 20 January 2006.

Originally, trams in Medellín were the most important transportation until 1950, but, after that, the rapidly increasing population and number of automobiles forcefully closed it in 1951. However, more than 60 years later, a new Translohr system (rubber-tired "tram"), the Ayacucho Tram, the first modern "tram" in Colombia, was opened on 30 September 2015. It is integrated with the metro system and the local bus network.

==== Public transportation statistics ====
The average amount of time people spend commuting with public transit in Medellín, for example to and from work, on a weekday is 66 min. 12% of public transit riders, ride for more than 2 hours every day. The average amount of time people wait at a stop or station for public transit is 11 min, while 14% of riders wait for over 20 minutes on average every day. The average distance people usually ride in a single trip with public transit is 5.9 km, while 5% travel for over 12 km in a single direction.

== Demographics ==
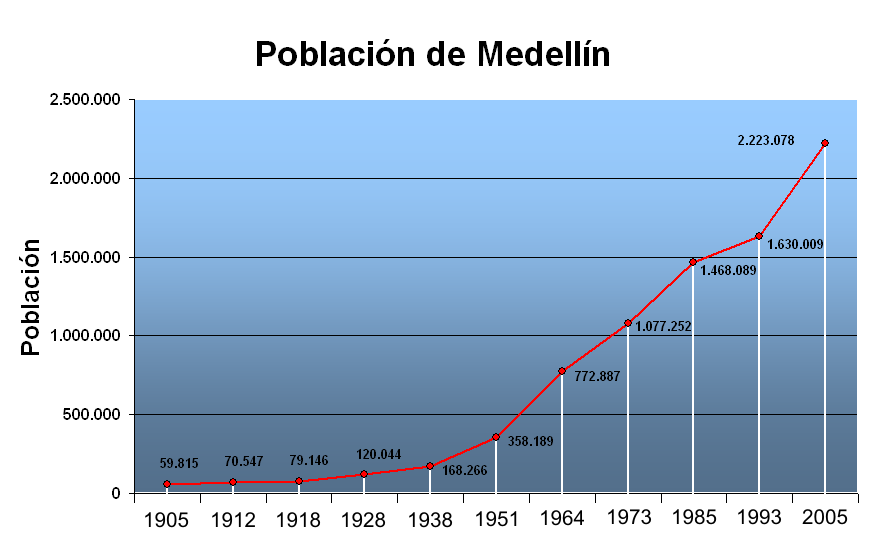
Historical population
| Census | Pop. | %± |
|---|---|---|
| 1905* | 59,815 | — |
| 1912* | 70,547 | 17.9% |
| 1918* | 79,146 | 12.2% |
| 1928* | 120,044 | 51.7% |
| 1938* | 168,266 | 40.2% |
| 1951** | 358,189 | 112.9% |
| 1964** | 772,887 | 115.8% |
| 1973** | 1,077,252 | 39.4% |
| 1985** | 1,468,089 | 36.3% |
| 1993** | 1,630,009 | 11.0% |
| 2005** | 2,223,078 | 36.4% |
| 2018** | 2,427,129 | 9.2% |
*Historia de Antioquia – **Censos del DANE

The Aburrá Valley contains 58% of the population of the Department of Antioquia, and 67% of the Aburrá Valley population lives in the city of Medellín. Of the inhabitants of Medellín, 61.3% were born in the city, 38% in other parts of Colombia and 0.3% in another country.

According to the National Administrative Department of Statistics (DANE), Medellín had a population of 2,427,129 inhabitants by 2018, making it the second largest city in Colombia. The metropolitan area of Medellín in 2005 included 3,312,165 inhabitants. There are 5,820 people per square kilometer in the city. There were 130,031 people living in the city townships; 46.7% of the population are male and 53.3% are female. Illiteracy is 5.8% in people older than 5 years old. 98.8% of the households in Medellín have electricity, 97.3% have drinking water, and 91% have a land-line phone.

According to the 2005 DANE census, in that year Medellín registered 33,307 births, slightly fewer than in 2004 (33,615). In 2005 the number of deaths was 10,828, in 2004 11,512.

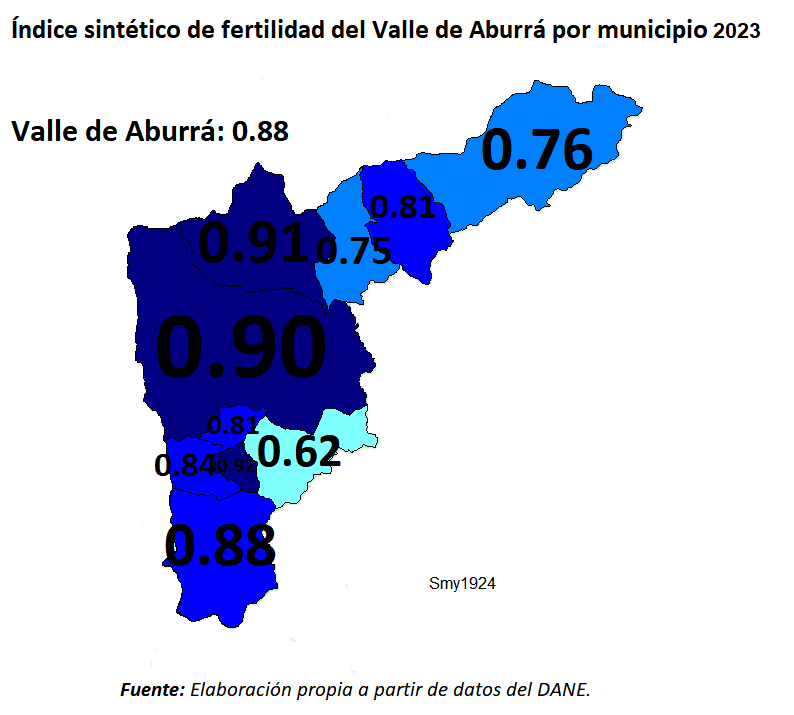
Total fertility rate by municipality Valle de Aburrá 2023

=== Ethnicities ===
According to figures submitted by the DANE census 2005, the ethnographic makeup of the city is:

- White/Mestizo: 93.4%
- Black, mulatto, Afro-Colombian or Afro-descendant: 6.5%
- Indigenous Amerindians: 0.1%

During the 17th and 18th centuries, Medellín received many immigrants from Spain. Most Indigenous peoples died from the introduction of Asiatic diseases, and many of those who survived intermarried with early Spanish settlers, who were mostly men; later, Spanish women also began to immigrate. Thousands of Irish, Scottish and English who settled in Antioquia fought for the Colombian army during independence. During the 19th and 20th centuries, immigrants arrived from Italy, Germany, United Kingdom, France, Portugal, Lebanon, Palestine and Syria. Many people from Medellín are referred to as Paisas, people of mainly Spanish ancestry, a lot of them Basque. There is a small Afro-Colombian and Zambo-Colombian (people of Indigenous and African descent) population.

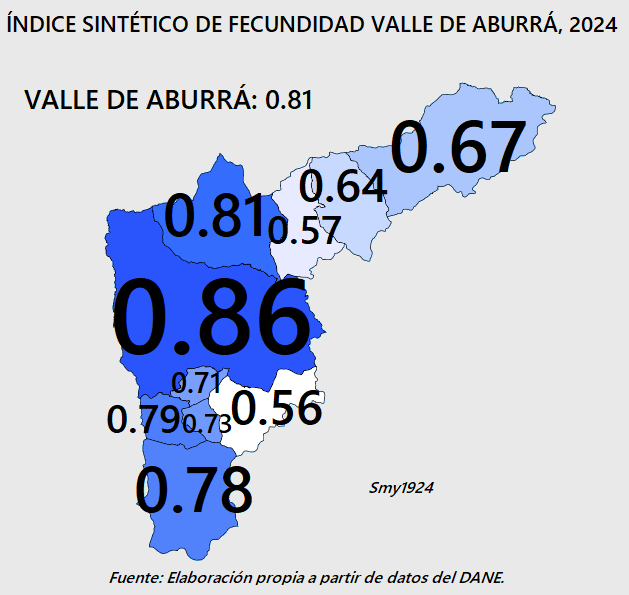
Total fertility rate by municipality Valle de Aburrá, 2024

The Chocó Department is just west of Antioquia, and is home to many Afro-Colombian and Zambo-Colombian migrants to Medellín and its vicinity. Migration from the Colombian Caribbean coast has been important, especially that of young people who come to study in Medellín universities and remain to work in the city. The main foreign immigration is of Ecuadorians and Venezuelans in informal trade.

== Culture ==
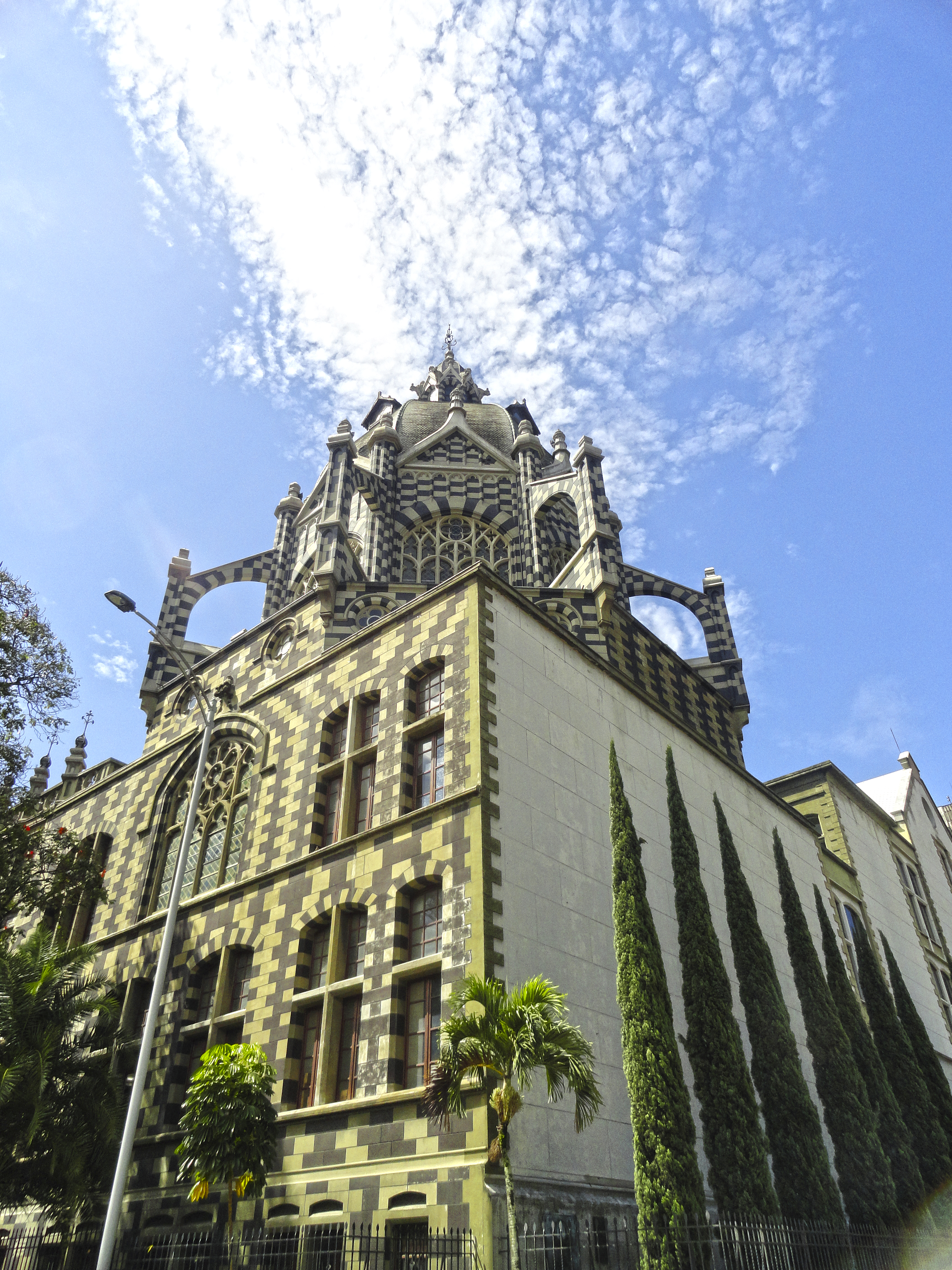
Rafael Uribe Uribe Palace of Culture

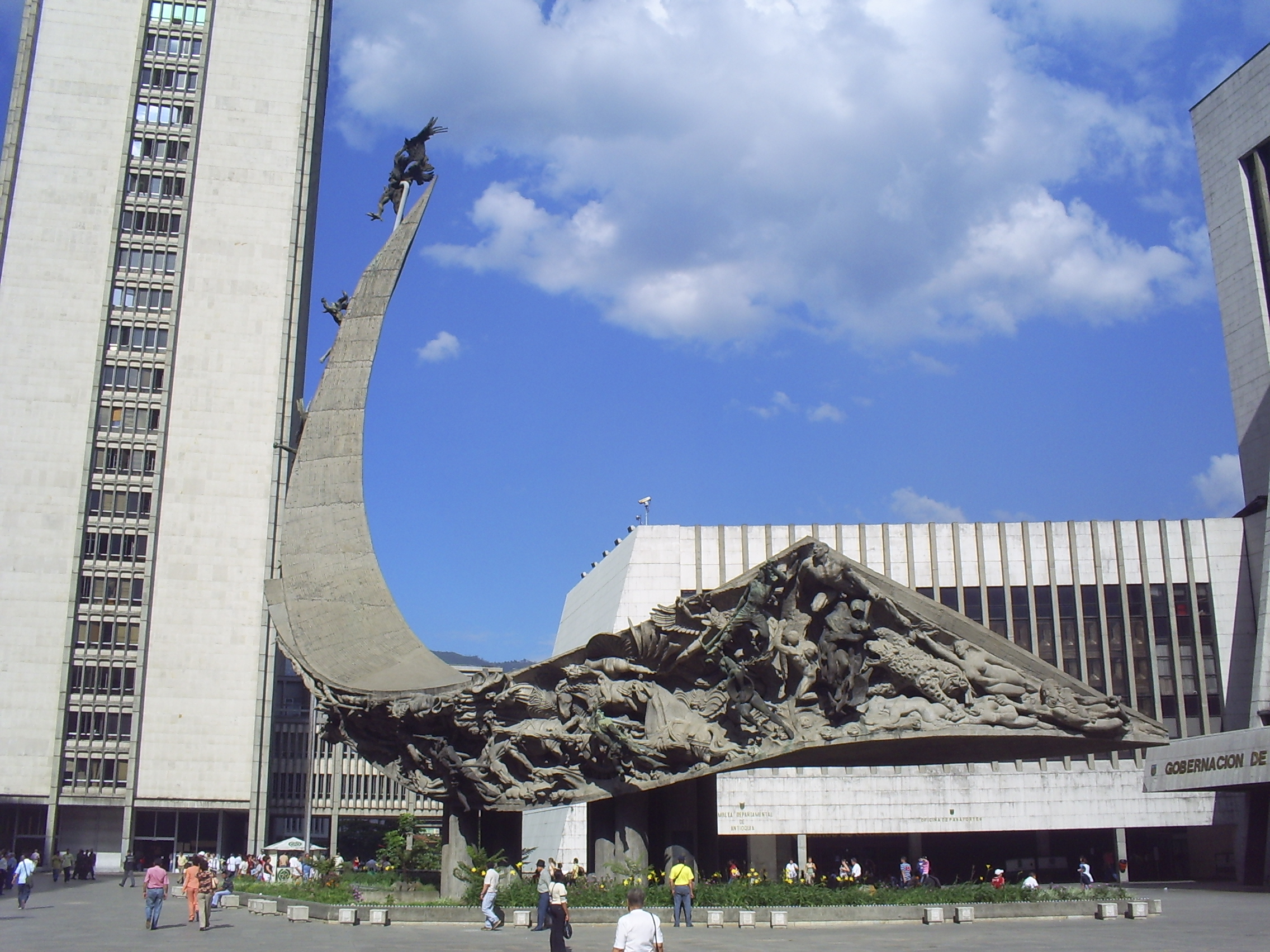
Monumento a la Raza by Rodrigo Arenas Betancur, located in La Alpujarra Administrative Center

The culture in Medellín is strongly linked to a broader Paisa culture (see next section) whose unique attributes include their Spanish accent, cuisine, and hospitality. Today, Medellín has several cultural attractions for the public including approximately 40 museums, 21 public parks, 28 theaters, and several public libraries. The city also contains several fixtures that have been designated National monuments of Colombia. The city is recognized as a "Design City" by UNESCO.

Most people in Medellín are Catholic, as reflected by Medellín's several churches and religious activities. Among the most representative churches are the Metropolitan Cathedral, the largest cathedral in the world built entirely in baked brick. There is also the Basilica of Our Lady of Candelaria, which was the official cathedral until 1931; the Church of San Ignacio, Baroque on the outside and Colonial on inside; the Church of San José; the Church of San Antonio, which has one of the biggest domes in Colombia; the Church of San José del Poblado, located in the Parque del Poblado where the first European settlement in the Aburrá Valley was founded in 1616; and the Church of Nuestra Señora de Belén. All of these churches have religious art and are located in the center of the city, which facilitates journeys among them.

In December, the city is covered with thousands of fairy lights, creating the famous Alumbrados (Christmas lights), which are considered by the National Geographic as one of the ten most beautiful in the world, and which can be seen mainly on La Playa Avenue and the Medellín River.

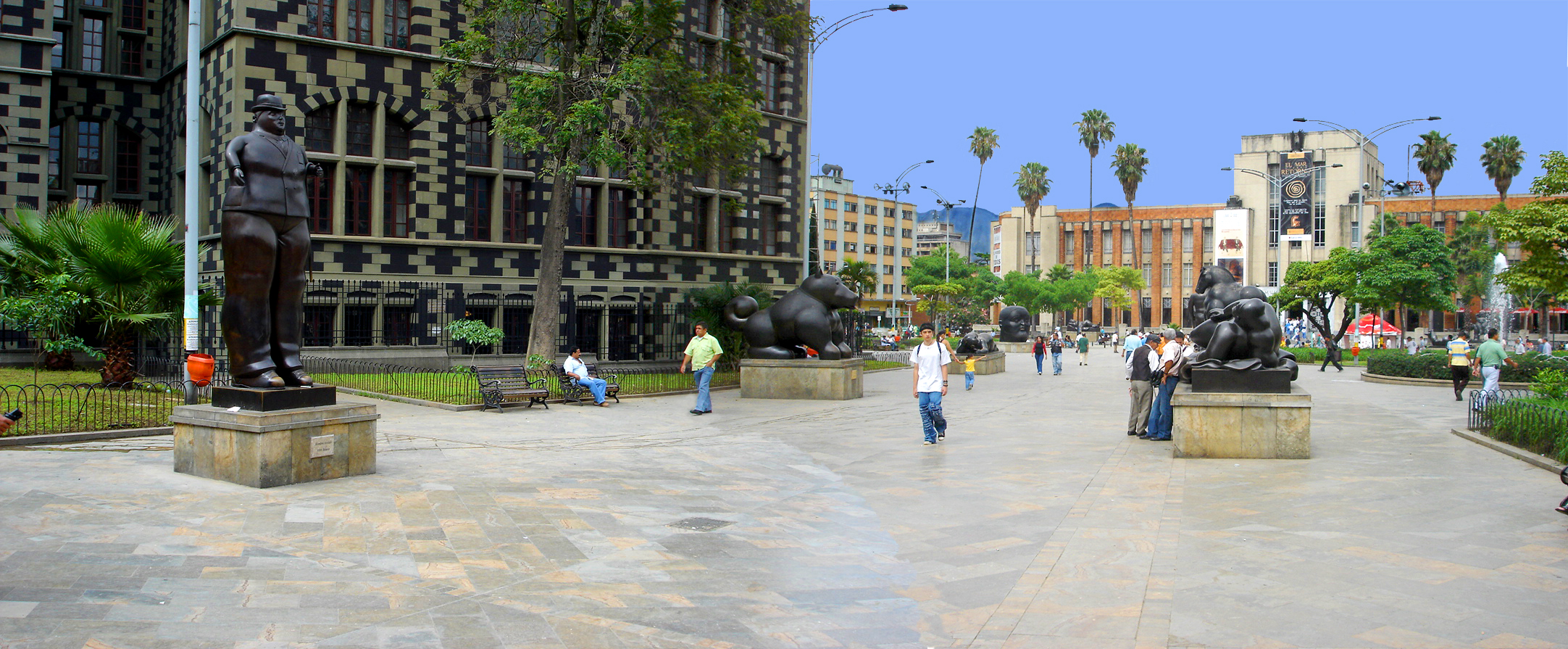
Plaza Botero, in the background the Museum of Antioquia

Plaza Mayor is the epicenter of large events and business. By a decree of the municipal government, between 1980 and 1990 all developments or tall buildings necessarily included a sculpture of a famous artist. That is one reason why Medellín has the largest number of sculptures per square kilometer in Colombia.

Furthermore, the city has several festivals and exhibitions year-round. The silletero tradition is also closely tied to the region and is considered a part of Colombian cultural heritage. Since 1957, this tradition has continued in the Silleta Parade that takes place during the annual Festival of the Flowers, where silletas designed with flower arrangements are carried.

Works of many prominent artists, both local and foreign, can be seen on the streets of the city. Some artists who stand out are the masters Rodrigo Arenas Betancur and Fernando Botero.

=== Paisa culture ===
The inhabitants of Medellín are often called Antioqueños (people of Antioquia) after their province, rather than Medellínenses (people of Medellín) after their city. They are also often known as Paisas, a name which some suggest comes from the coffee growers. The term Paisa comes from the word paisano, meaning "fellow countryman". Paisas make up one of the five different regional cultures within Colombia. In addition to Antioquia, the Paisa region includes the departments of Caldas, Risaralda, Quindio and some towns of Valle del Cauca and Tolima. Although Paisa culture is dominant in Medellín, the so-called "Paisa Capital", the city is becoming more cosmopolitan, now offering music from other regions of Colombia (Vallenato and Chocó), and a variety of restaurants including Chinese, Cuban, and Argentinian.

The Paisa culture has a Spanish background, and is traditionally Catholic, and entrepreneurial. Paisas are said to speak softly and slowly, to smile easily, and to love music, poetry, soccer, bargaining in the markets, and parties. They are proud of their city, and work hard to keep it clean, stemming from the campaign begun in the 1980s, "Depende tambien de ti, darle amor a Medellín" (It depends on you too to give love to Medellín). The Medellín weekend nightlife, in discos, pubs, parks, and certain dedicated streets, is traditionally called rumba.

=== Festivals and events ===
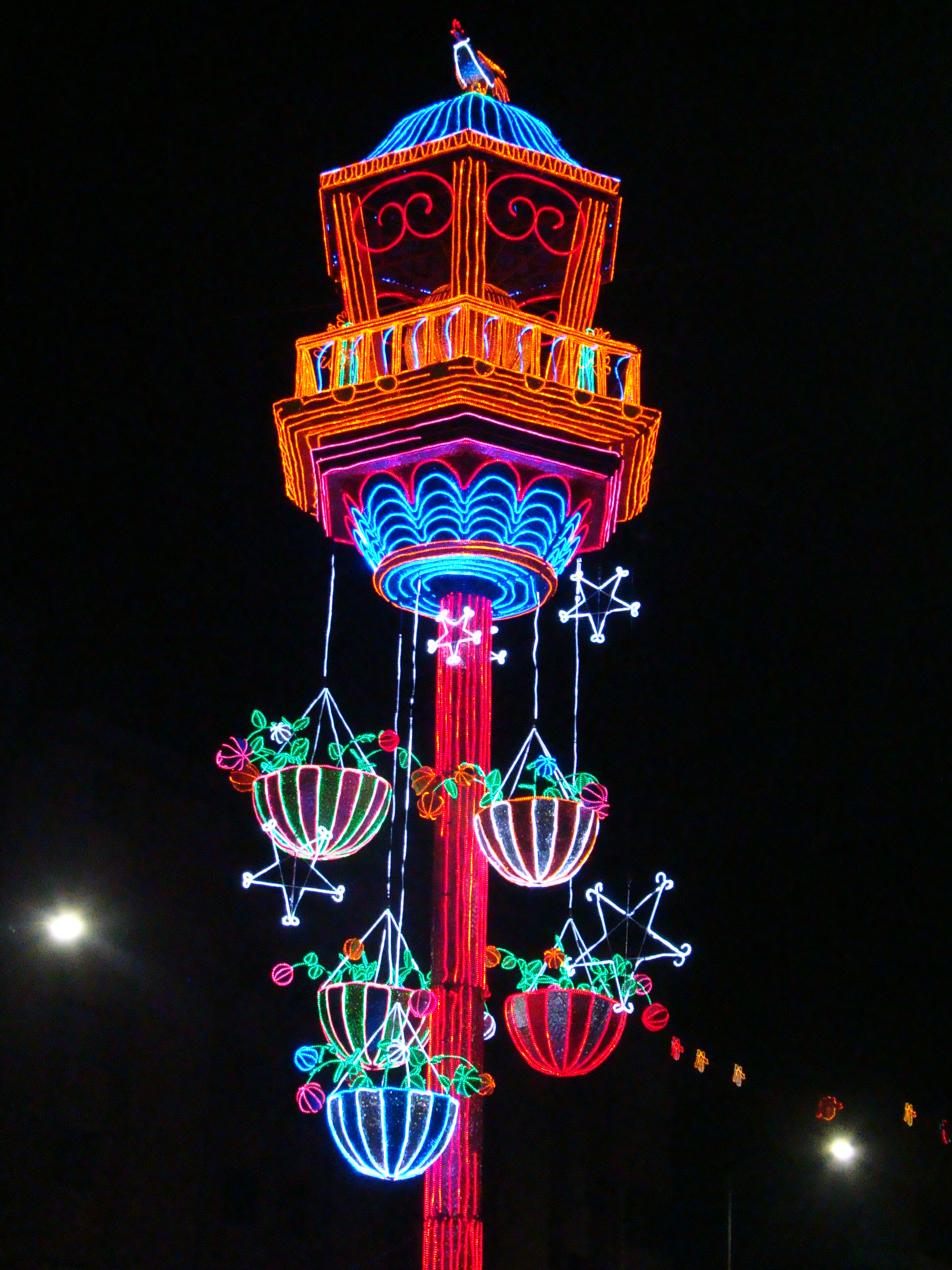
Christmas Lighting on La Playa Avenue in 2011

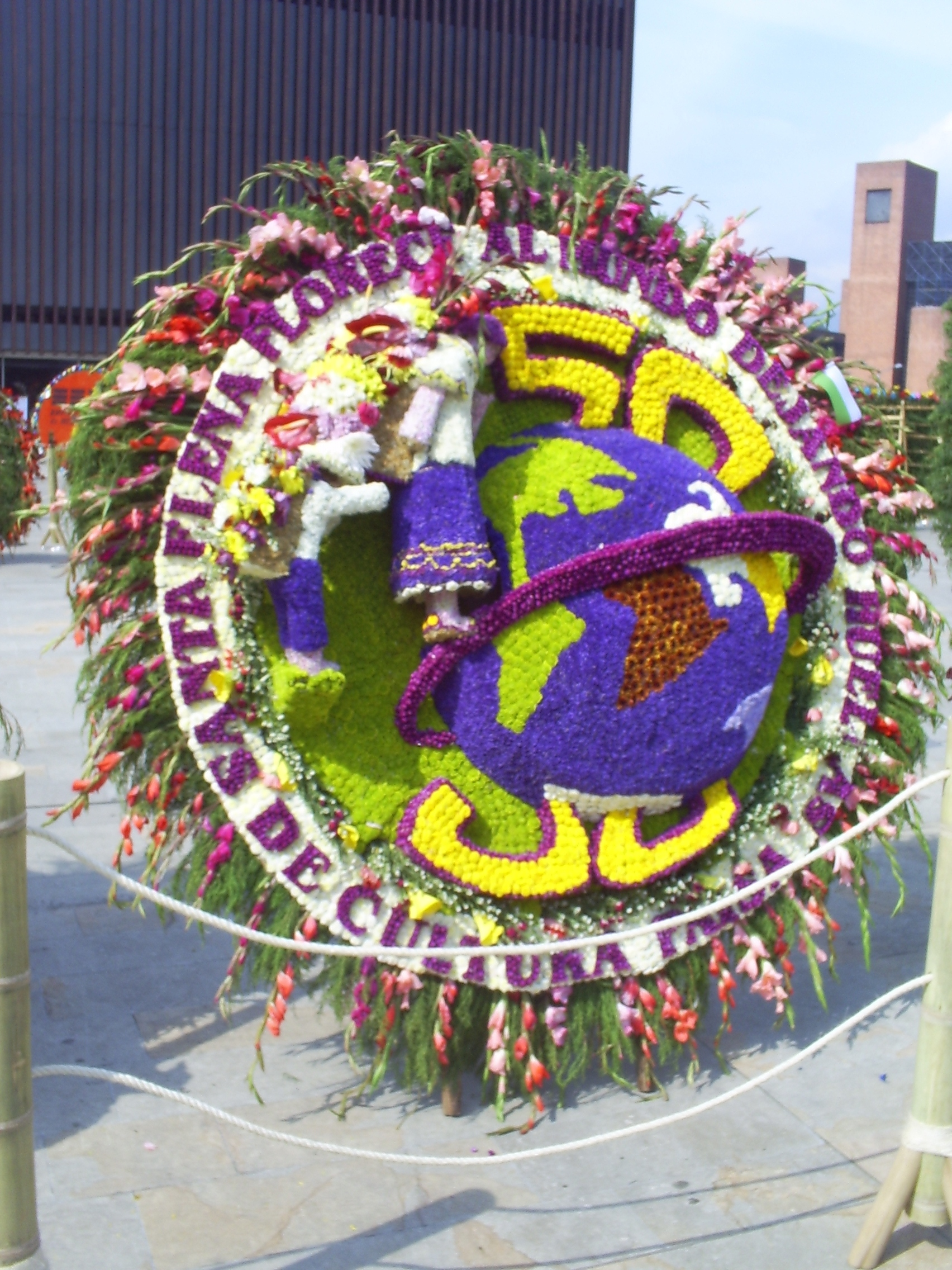
An example of a silleta at the Festival of the Flowers

- Festival of the Flowers is held late July to early August. The Festival, plus many other activities and festivities, is the main axis the Desfile de Silleteros, a colorful and artistic parade of flowers filled saddles on the back for their own grower and already well known internationally.
- Christmas lighting in Medellín is a traditional seasonal event where the city hangs millions of Christmas lights and holds light shows and other cultural events. National Geographic ranked Medellín Christmas lights display as one of the top 10 places to see Christmas lights in the world.
- International Poetry Festival is an annual congregation of poets, who give at public their poems and readings of a peculiar way mass in parks, auditoriums, neighborhoods and towns near Medellín. This event has been awarded the Right Livelihood Award, the prelude to the Nobel Peace Prize by the Right Livelihood Foundation of Sweden, and its aim is to strive for peace through poetry. The XVII International Poetry Festival of Medellín was performed between 14 and 22 July 2007, with the participation of over 80 poets from around 55 nations.
- International Tango Festival is an expression of the tango culture that Medellín adopted as their own. This is a legacy of the bard Carlos Gardel, who died in this city in a plane crash in 1935. Among the activities of the Festival highlights the Tangovía, where people took to the streets to dance, listen to tango, milonga and obviously having fun at the behest of culture.
- Book and Culture Festival is one of the most important cultural events in Medellín, named itself Festival, rather than Fair, due to its magical atmosphere that revolves around art, books and culture. The Festival is hosted for 10 days at the Botanical Garden in the month of September, and it is held with the participation of both national and international participants and exhibitors from all genres. The Book and Culture Festival is free entry, and aims to promote reading through different workshops. This event is sponsored by the Mayor of Medellín.
- Feria internacional del caballo Since 2009 was added to the horse paisa culture the Feria internacional del caballo, held in October, an exhibition with participants from several countries and involving varied horse races.
- Bullfighting Festival of La Macarena held every year between January and February.

=== Museums and other venues ===
Medellín has about 40 galleries, which are one of the main attractions of the city. Some of the main museums include the following:

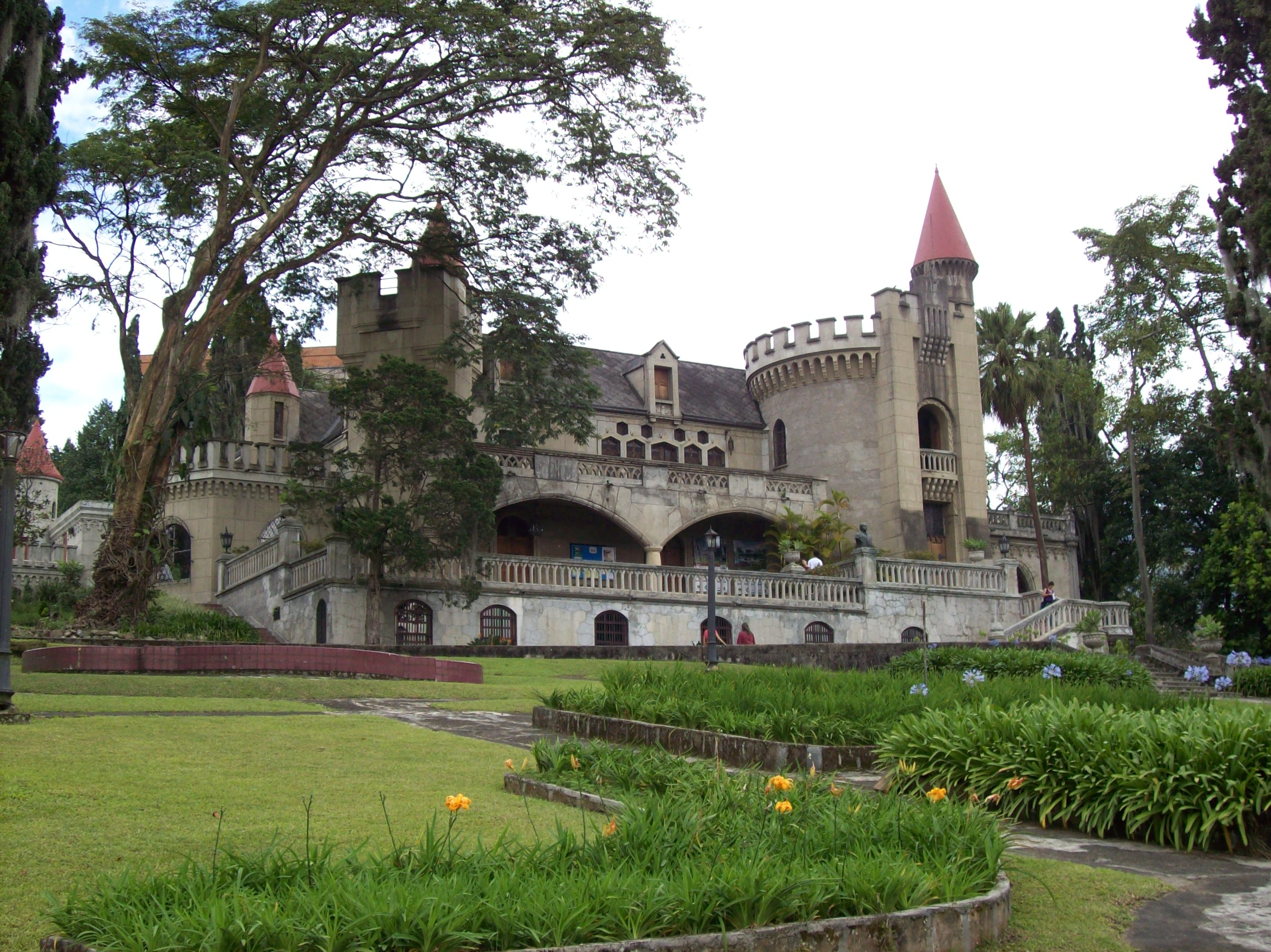
Museum El Castillo

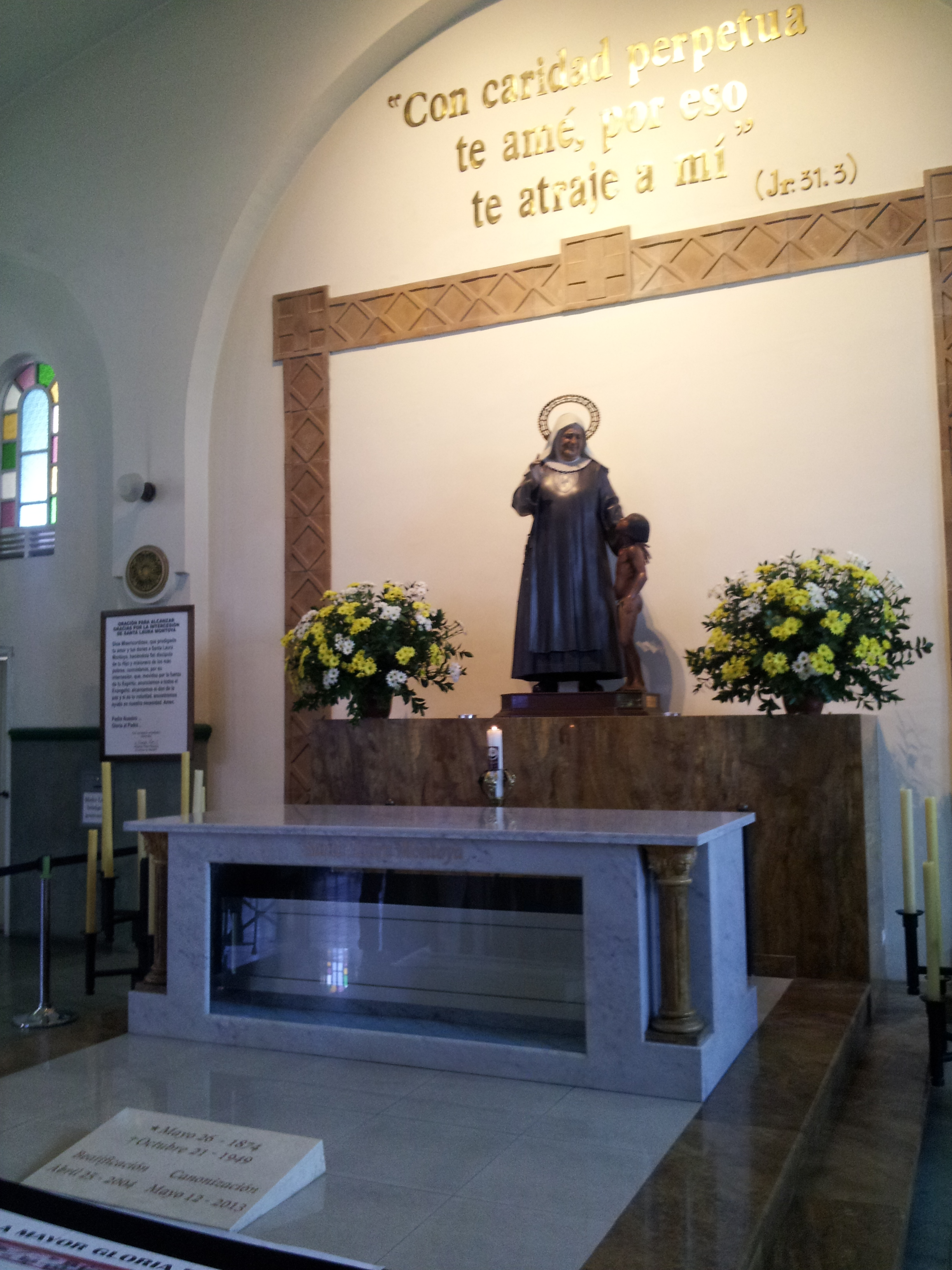
Tomb of Saint Laura Montoya Upegui

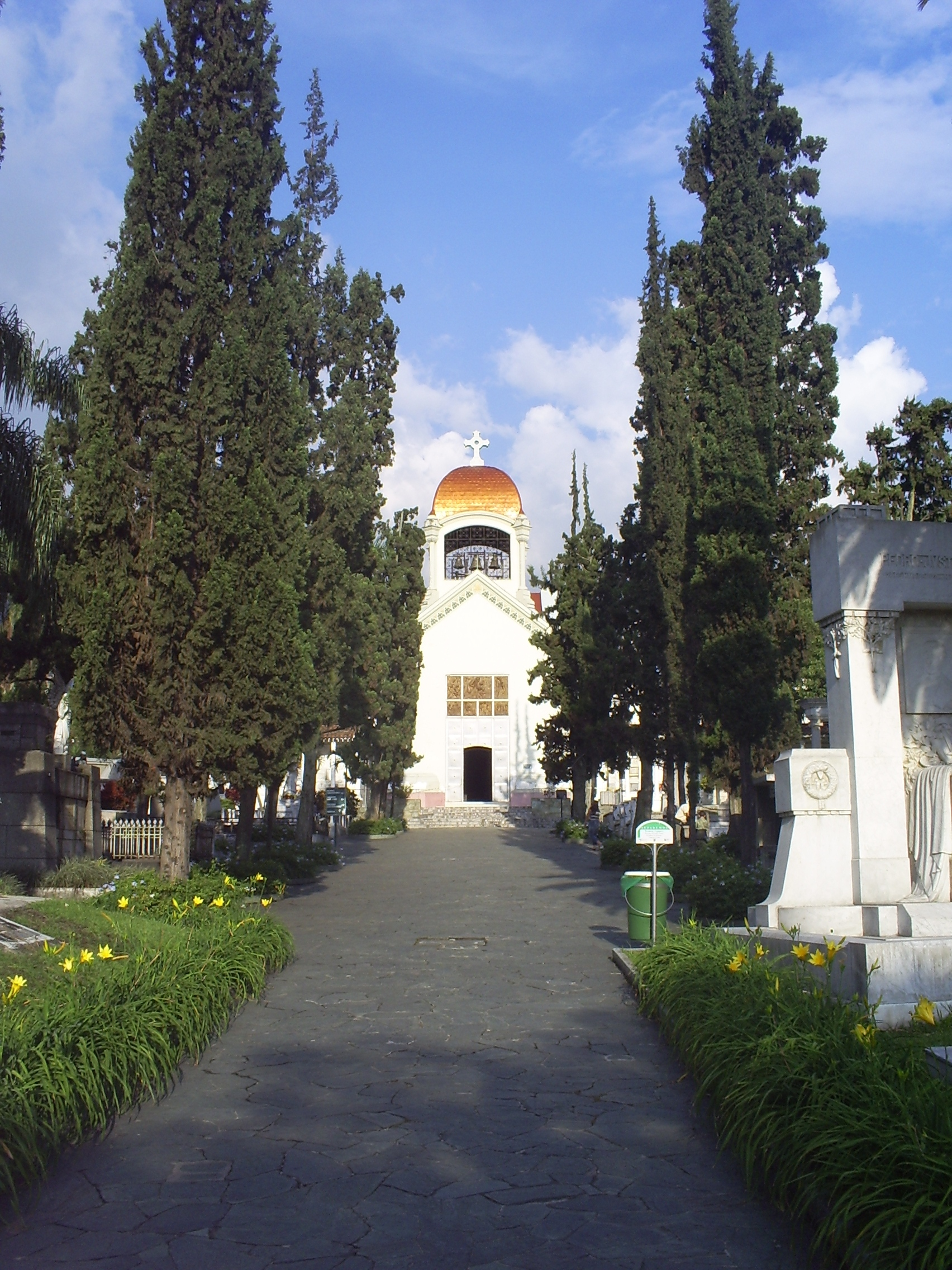
San Pedro Cemetery Museum

- Museum of Antioquia was the second museum founded in Colombia and the first in the department of Antioquia. It is located at the heart of the old city hall next to Botero Plaza, and houses 187 works of Fernando Botero.
- Museum of Modern Art of Medellín (MAMM), founded in 1978, has a valuable collection of contemporary art comprising sculptures, assemblages, paintings, photographs, and prints by local and foreign artists. One of its major attractions is the collection of almost all the works of the Antioquian painter Débora Arango. Another of its main attractions is the projection of cinema-art. It is also headquarters of the International Biennale of Video in September.
- University Museum, University of Antioquia, was created in 1942, is located in University City. The area of anthropology exhibits a collection of 18 000 pieces of pre-Columbian pottery, stone, shell, metal and textiles, the second richest in the country, and a complete ethnographic collection. The area of visual arts includes contemporary painting and sculpture, and includes 1200 pieces of contemporary artists. The area of History at the university collects in a thousand pieces and documents the 200 years of existence of the university, and the natural sciences section displays 5400 pieces, including native and exotic stuffed animals, skins for study, minerals and fossils.
- Museum El Castillo, built in 1930 in medieval Gothic and open to the public in 1971, has French-style gardens, explosions room, library and concert hall for 250 people. It has permanent exhibits of porcelain and glass, stained glass, music, sculpture, piano and ballet.
- Interactive Museum EPM environment is part of Barefoot Park. Receives 1000 visit a day, mostly students. This is an educational tour of 22 rooms spread over four buildings in which, with technological resources and entertaining way, is explained and interacts with the physical principles of water, energy, gas and telecommunications. It is funded and managed by Empresas Públicas de Medellín.
- Mineralogy Museum is located in the School of Mines of the National University of Colombia. It has a permanent exhibition of a total of 2778 specimens; its collections are recognized by mineralogists and experts among the best museums in South America.
- San Pedro Cemetery Museum was built in 1842, became a museum in 1998 and declared a national monument in 1999. This place is an integral part of cultural and architectural heritage of Medellín. Although it falls under the category of sculpture and architecture works representing the funerary art, the space has begun to emerge as a new venue for artistic dissemination. It has preserved collections of local and national art and, on full moon nights, there are concerts, shows, storytelling, theater and dance. Undoubtedly the most significant are the funerary monuments in memory of prominent figures in national history.
- House Museum Master Pedro Nel Gómez was the home of the master Pedro Nel Gómez; it became a museum in 1975 with the donation by the artist and his family of the works in it. It has 1500 works, 200 square meters (2,200 square feet) of fresco painting and an art library with over 500 volumes.
- Casa Museo Gardeliana disseminates the culture and history of the tango. It was declared a Cultural Heritage and Historic Monument by the Council of Medellín in 2002. It was founded on 14 February 1973, by the Argentine Leonardo Nieto Jarbon in the neighborhood Manrique, in a simple, traditional house. The tango singer Carlos Gardel met his death in Medellín in accident airplane crash. There has long existed in the city a deep tango culture. Some plaques testify the visit to the house of personalities from politics, entertainment and literature, as the Argentine writer Jorge Luis Borges.
- Parque Explora is an interactive museum focused on science, technology and many other aspects of knowledge and creativity. It provides, among other attractions, the largest freshwater aquarium in South America that houses fish of the Amazon and Orinoco rivers.
- Planetarium of Medellín is located in front of the Parque de Los Deseos. The space includes telescopes and a projection room for 300 people, a dome 17.5 meters (57 feet) in diameter, and permanent exhibitions for all ages on Earth and space. Its services include an auditorium, library and a permanent exhibition on space history.

Other prominent museums are Centro Cultural Banco de la República, Entomological Museum Francisco Luis Gallego, Casa Museo Santa Fe, Museum of Natural Sciences, Ethnographic Museum Miguel Ángel Builes and the Mother Laura Ethnographic Museum.

=== Public art ===
Medellín is well known for having great public art, and there are many buildings that have prominent sculptures outside them. In addition to the sculpture park of Fernando Botero, there are many other sculptural gems by a variety of contemporary and modernist artists scattered around the city. They include works by the artist Hugo Zapata amongst others.

=== Cuisine ===
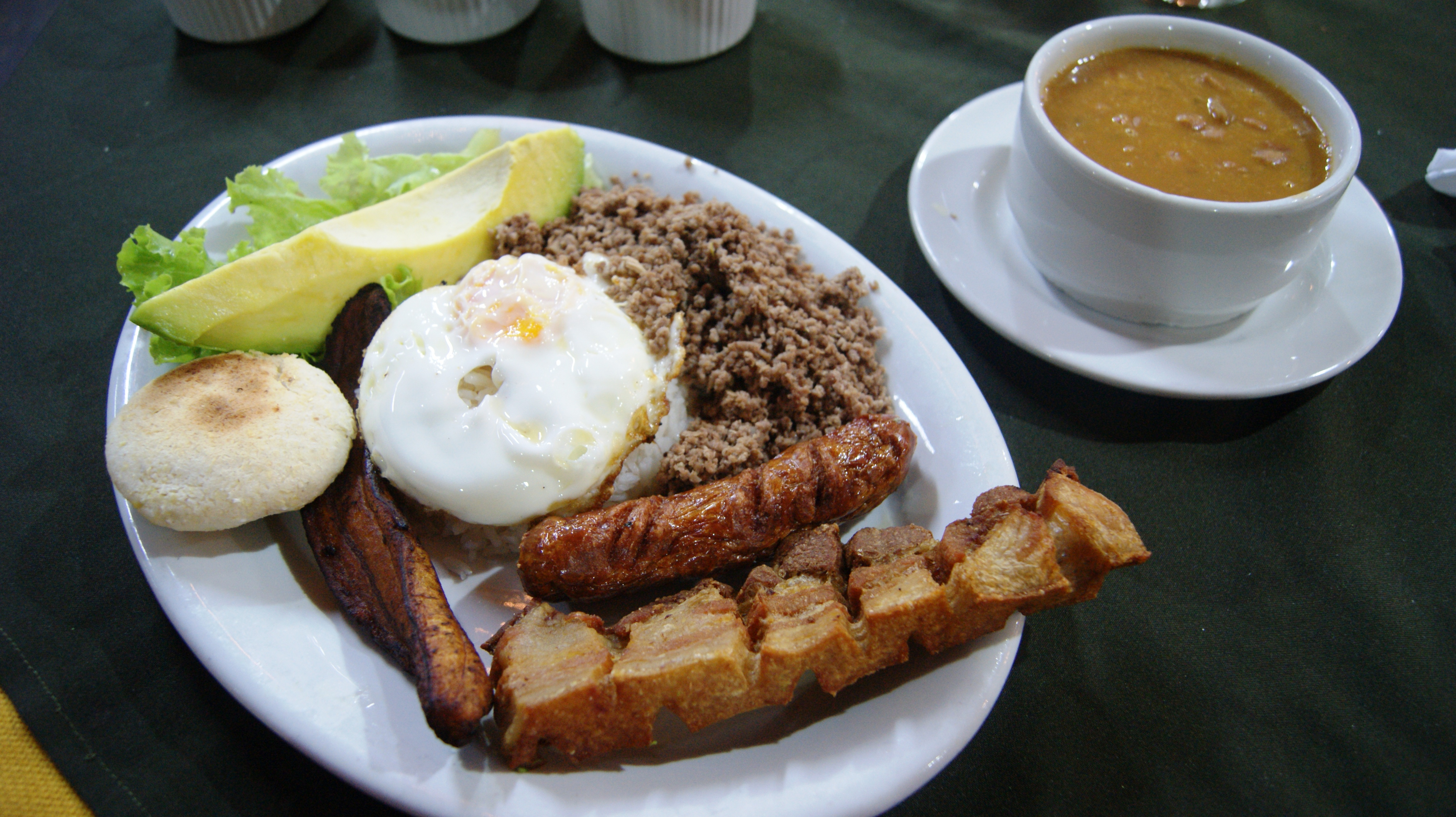
Bandeja paisa is the representative food of Medellín and Antioquia.

The cuisine of Medellín is again tied to the larger culture of Antioquia. A typical regional dish is the bandeja paisa, meaning the "paisa platter", which usually includes beans, rice, pork cracklings (or "chicharrón"), chorizo, a fried egg, patacónes, salad and avocado. It is traditionally served on a tray slab or wood. It is traditional to consume meals with arepas, which are made with cooked, milled, and mixed corn without further ingredients.

For breakfast, it is common to accompany the food with hot chocolate and possibly a slice of cheese to dunk in the drink. Parva is a traditional component of the Antioquian gastronomy as well. This name is given to a wide variety of sweet and savory baked goods, including pan de queso, pan de bono, buñuelos, and pastries.

Other foods that are typical in the region stem from Colombian food industries, such as Postobón's Colombian soft drinks, the regional aguardiente known as Aguardiente Antioqueño, and Jet chocolate bars.

=== Creative Tourism ===
Medellín has developed its Cultural Tourism through various activities such as cooking workshops, dancing classes or arts and craft. Medellín is an official Creative Tourism City thanks to its cultural richness and its wide array of activities between tradition and innovation.

== Sports and recreation ==
Football is the most popular sport and is widely played in the city. Medellín has two professional clubs: Independiente Medellín, founded in 1913, and Atlético Nacional, founded in 1935. Both teams play at the Atanasio Girardot Stadium. The city has a soccer legacy thanks to notable players such as René Higuita, Iván Córdoba, Andrés Escobar, Víctor Aristizábal, Jackson Martínez and many others. Other notable sportsmen of the city are the professional golfer and PGA Tour player Camilo Villegas, Medellín-born Israeli Olympic show jumping rider Daniel Bluman, and the retired Formula One, Champ Car, and IndyCar driver Roberto Guerrero.

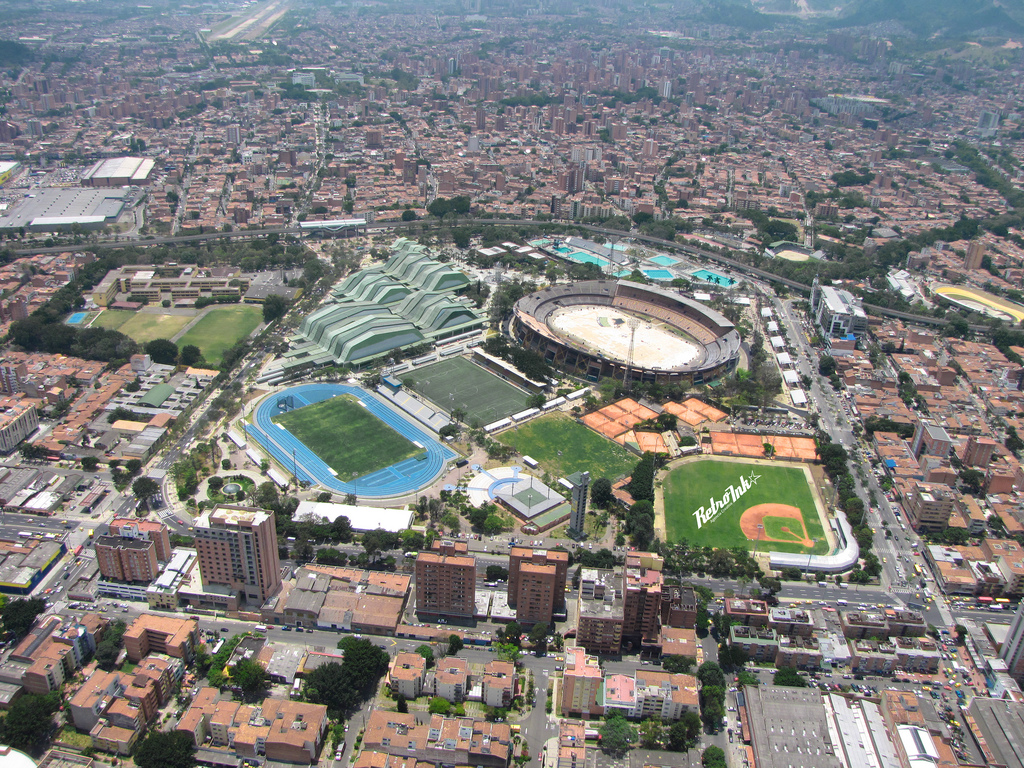
Atanasio Girardot Sports Complex

A popular sport in Medellín, and generally throughout Antioquia, is horseback riding; therefore, it has encouraged trade and production of tools and equipments for this activity, such as chairs and horseshoes for export. During the Festival of the Flowers, the cavalcades achieved a Guinness World Record in 1996 and 1999.

The city also has two Colombian professional basketball teams: the Arrieros of Antioquia and the Mountain Academy.

=== Hosting ===
The Atanasio Girardot Sports Complex is the main sports arena complex of the city. It covers an area of 280,000 m^{2} (3,013,895 sq ft) and encompasses fields and stadiums for practice and competition for 34 sports. This is the headquarters of most professional sports leagues in Medellín. The sports complex has hosted several events, including the 2011 FIFA U-20 World Cup, the 2010 South American Games, and the 2001 Copa América.

In 2011, Medellín hosted the 15th IAAF Pan American Race Walking Cup. Athletes and teams from the countries in North, South, and Central American as well as the Caribbean Islands participated. In 2013, Medellín hosted the IAAF Pan American Junior Athletics Championships for track and field. Again, athletes and teams from the countries in North, South, and Central America as well as the Caribbean Islands participated. The junior athletes competed as a test trial for the 2018 Summer Youth Olympics.

Medellín bid to host the 2018 Summer Youth Olympics but was defeated by Buenos Aires in the 4 July 2013 vote.

=== Cycling and BMX ===
Another representative sport in the city is cycling. Its respective sport venue is the Martin Rodriguez Velodrome, named after Colombian road racing cyclist Martín Emilio Rodríguez. BMX is also catered for, and its main venue is the BMX Track Antonio Roldán Betancur. The retired cycling three-time Tour de France stage winner and World Time-Trial Champion Santiago Botero and the Olympic Gold Medalist and multiple BMX World Champion Mariana Pajón are both from Medellín.

EnCicla is the name of Medellín's bicycle sharing system, the first bike sharing program in Latin America and the only one of its kind in Colombia. It was the shared winner of the Sustainable Transport Award in 2012 along with San Francisco. EnCicla is the result of an agreement between the metropolitan area of the Valley of Aburrá and EAFIT University. EnCicla is integrated within the city's existing infrastructure of cycle routes, mass transit, and public transport systems. It is available from Monday to Friday from 5:30 am to 8 pm from every EnCicla station.

== Symbols ==
The coat of arms, flag and anthem of the city, has the recognition of official symbols of the municipality of Medellín according to Decree No. 151 20 February 2002, and as emblems of the city are part of the corporate image of management municipal, and therefore are present in the acts, events and official media in which these should appear by its representative character.

=== Coat of arms ===
| Heraldic version | Versions of the municipality bodies | |
|---|---|---|
| With the shape called modern French style | Version used by the Mayor | Version used by the Council |

The Medellín coat of arms is the oldest emblem of the city, having its origins in a grant by King Charles II of Spain by royal decree issued in Madrid on 31 March of 1678:

...On a blue field shield, a very thick and round tower, battlemented, an inescutcheon of fifteen parts – seven blue and eight gold, on each of the sides a smaller tower, and in between them an image of Our Lady on a cloud with her son in her arms...

However, a more refined and structured in heraldic language, though not official, would be:

In an Azure field, a round tower of gold stands, masoned and clarified by sable, with a checkered escutcheon of 15 pieces – 7 blue and 8 gold (coat of arms of House of Portocarrero) – stamped with an ancient crown of gold between its two towers, with a cloud upon which stands the image of Our Lady of Candelaria carrying the Child in her left arm, a candle in her right hand, radiant, she is flanked by forming clouds from each county.

First coat of arms of Medellín

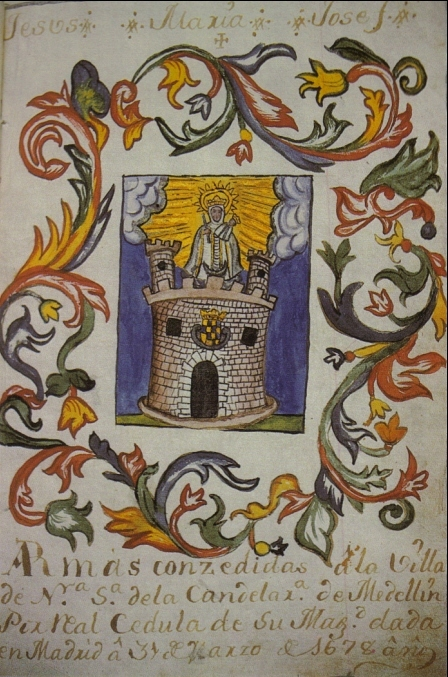
Coat of Arms of Medellín in 1678

The blazon has remained over time since it was granted, without further changes to the aesthetics, it is noteworthy that there are different stylistic versions between the Mayor and City Council also meets aesthetic not heraldic standards.

=== Flag ===
To strengthen the links with the region, the municipality adopted the flag of the Department of Antioquia, which was added to the coat of arms of the city, so that these could make difference. The flag consists of two horizontal stripes of equal proportions, the white top and green bottom, and in the middle between two strips is located the coat. The white color symbolizes purity, integrity, obedience, firmness and eloquence. The green represents hope, abundance, freedom and faith.

=== Anthem ===
The anthem of the city of Medellín is "Anthem of Antioquia", according to Decree No. 151 20 February 2002, Article 10, which says: "Anthem of Medellín. To unify the ideals of the region the Antioquia anthem is adopted (lyrics by Epifanio Mejia and music by Gonzalo Vidal) as the Anthem of the Municipality of Medellín. It will be sung in all official functions where the Mayor of Medellín is present."

== International relations ==
=== Twin towns ===
Medellín is twinned with:

- Asunción, Paraguay
- Bogotá D.C, Colombia
- Cali, Colombia
- Pasto, Nariño, Colombia
- Buenos Aires, Argentina
- Rosario, Argentina
- Gold Coast, Australia
- São Paulo, Brazil
- Manaus, Brazil
- Chapecó, Brazil
- Varna, Bulgaria
- Tijuana, Mexico
- Dubai, United Arab Emirates
- Fort Lauderdale, Florida, U.S.
- New York City, U.S.
- Chicago, Illinois, U.S.
- Miami, Florida, U.S.
- Tacuarembó, Uruguay
- Phoenix, Arizona, U.S

=== Other forms of city partnership ===
- Barcelona, Spain.
- Bilbao, Spain
- Recife, Brazil
- Zapopan, Mexico

== Gallery ==
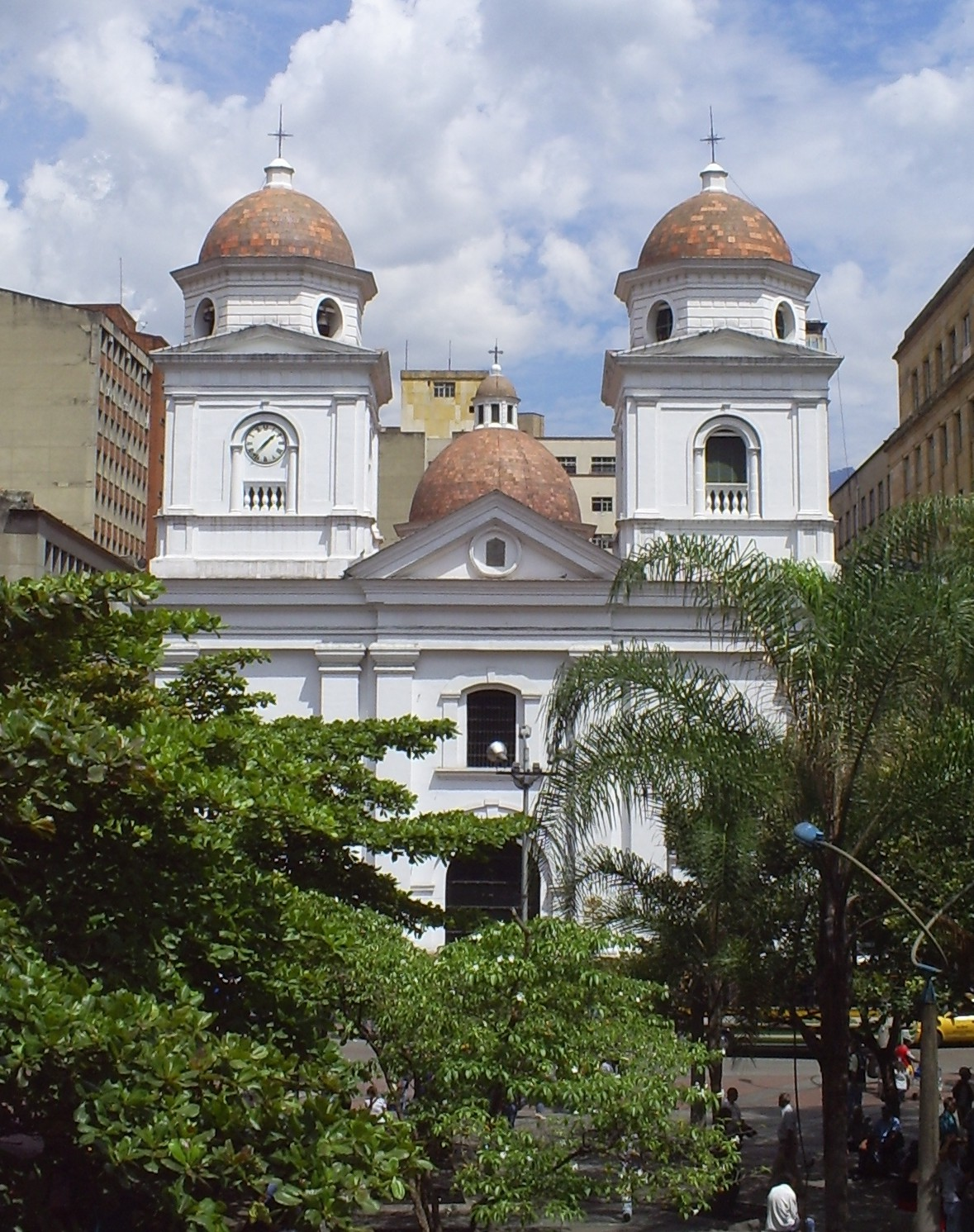
Basilica of Our Lady of Candelaria

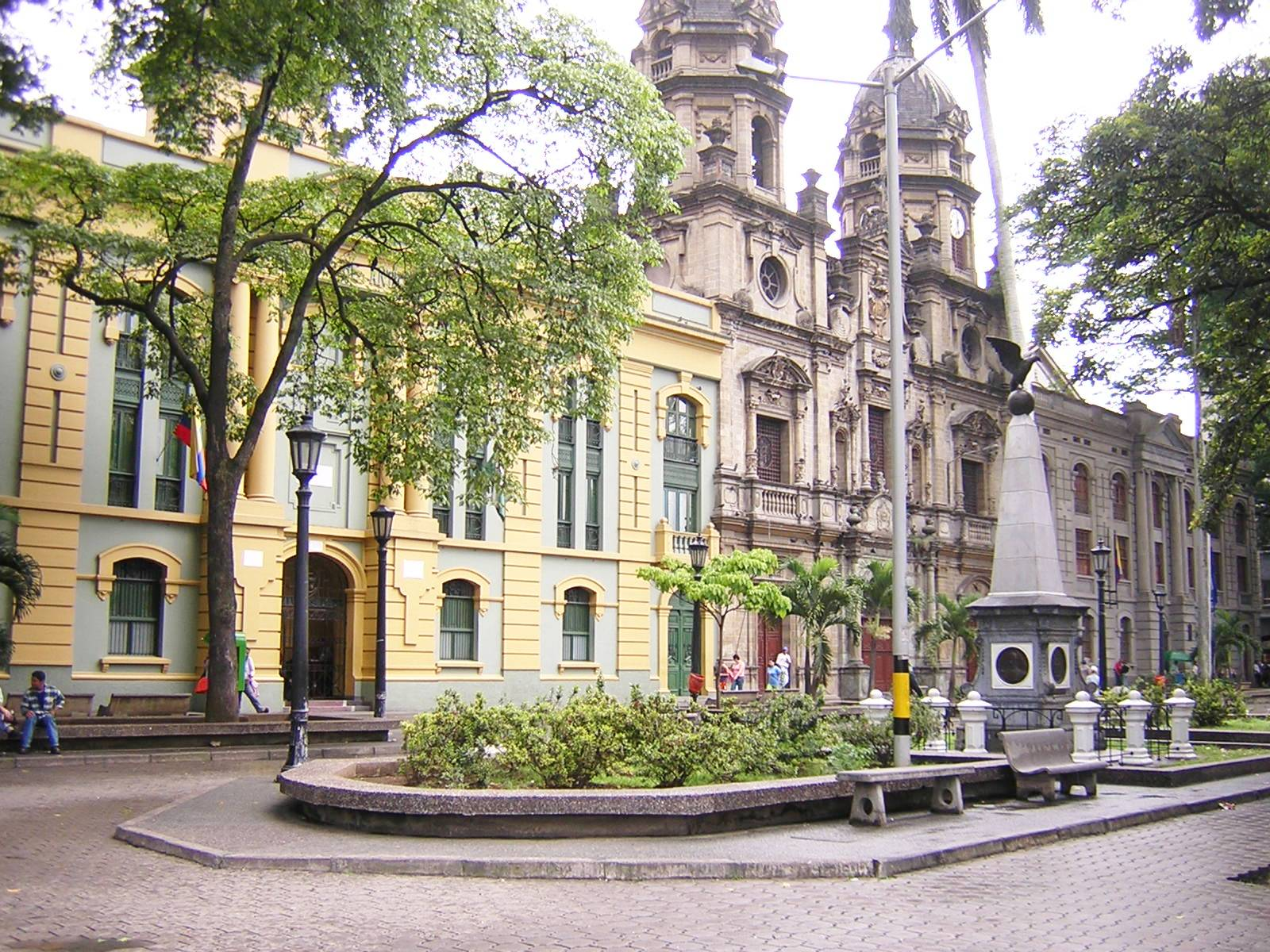
San Ignacio Square

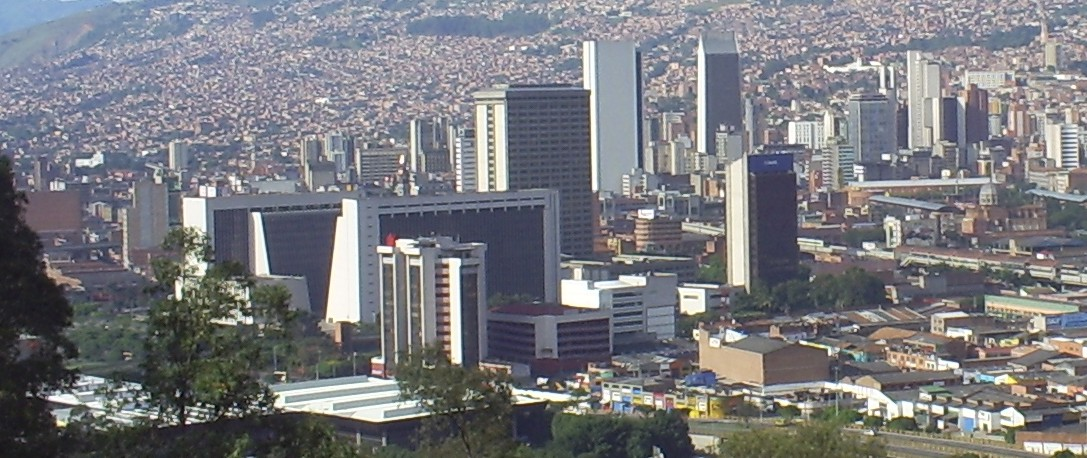
Downtown Medellín

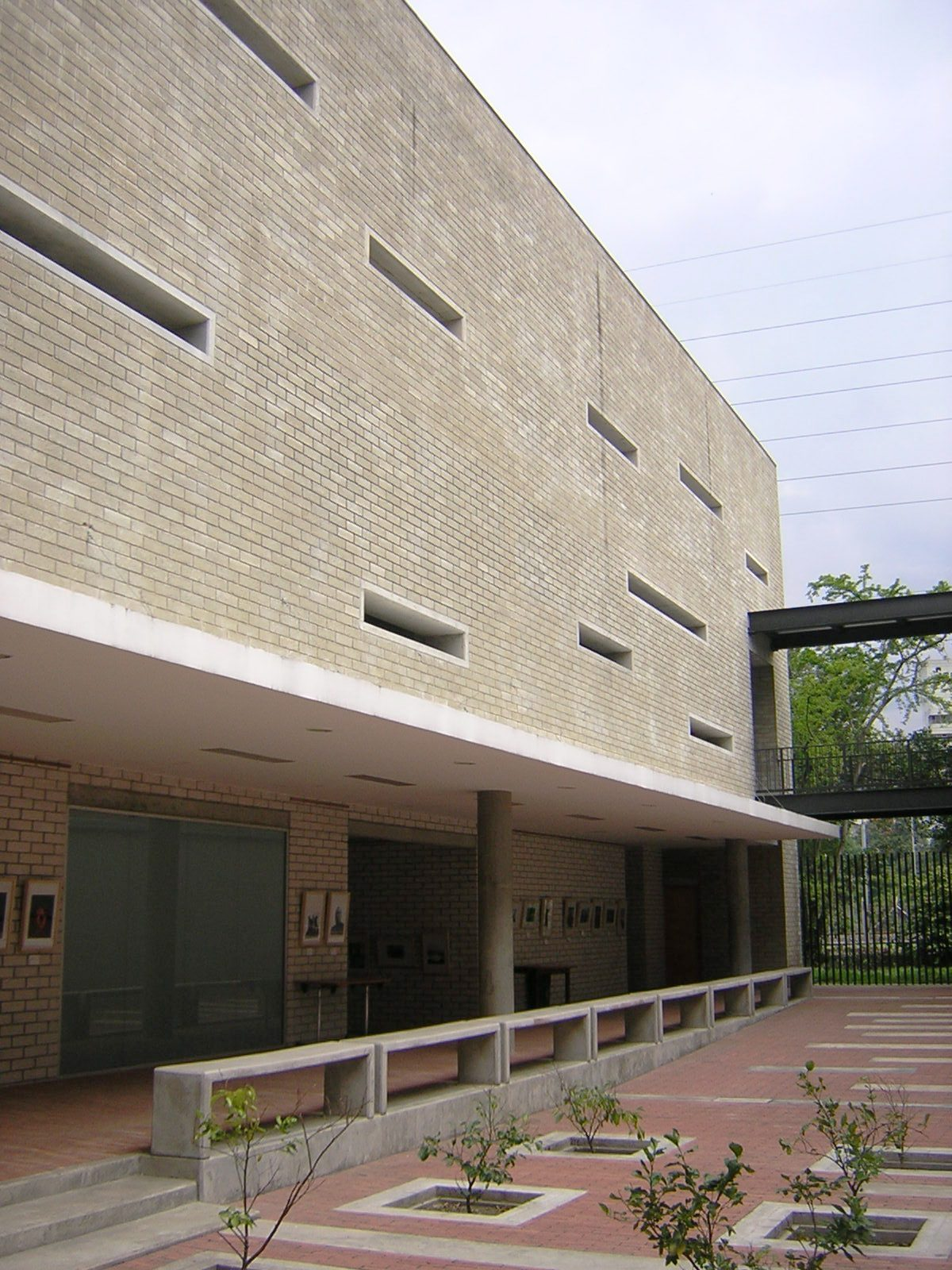
Pilot Public Library

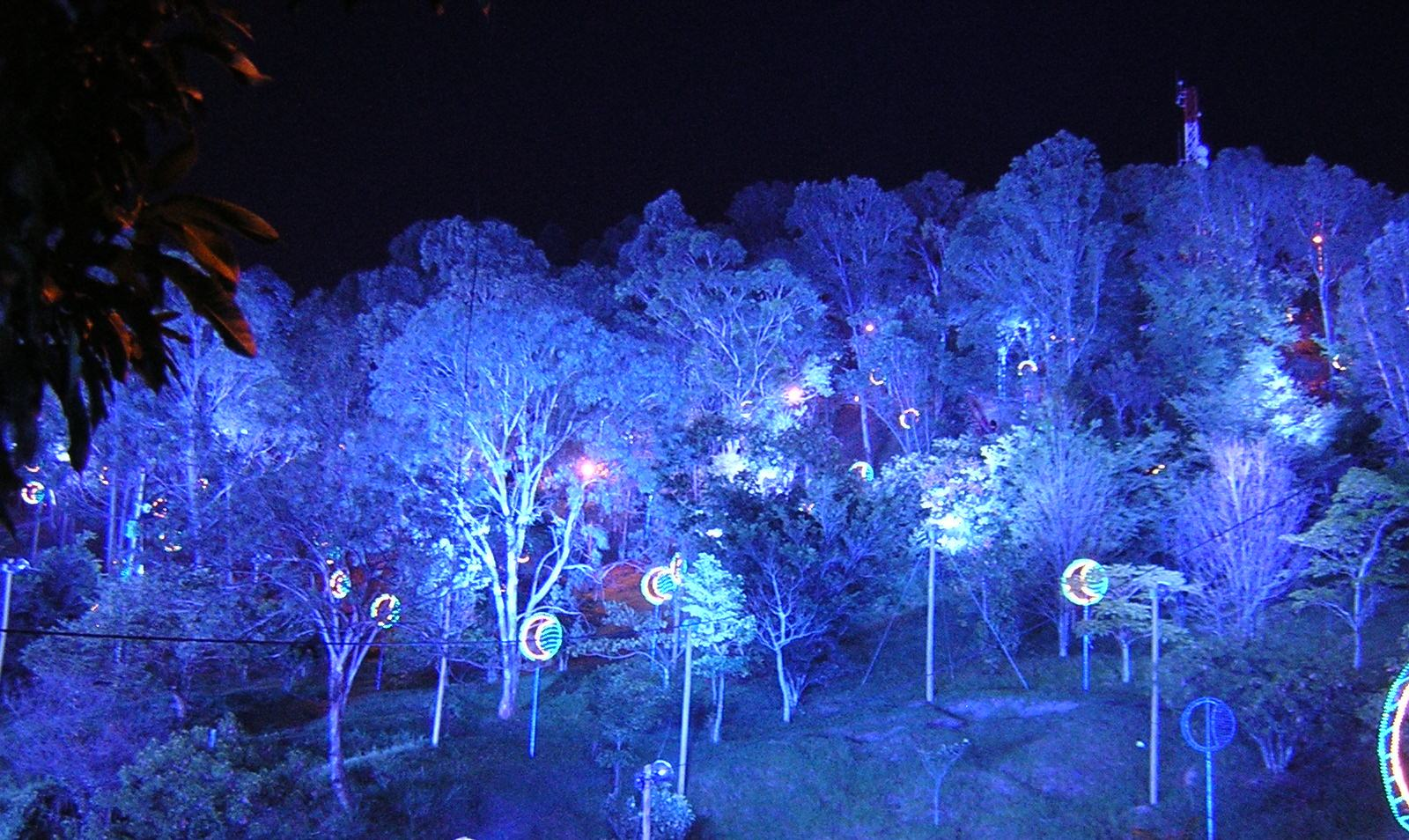
Christmas lights at Nutibara Hill

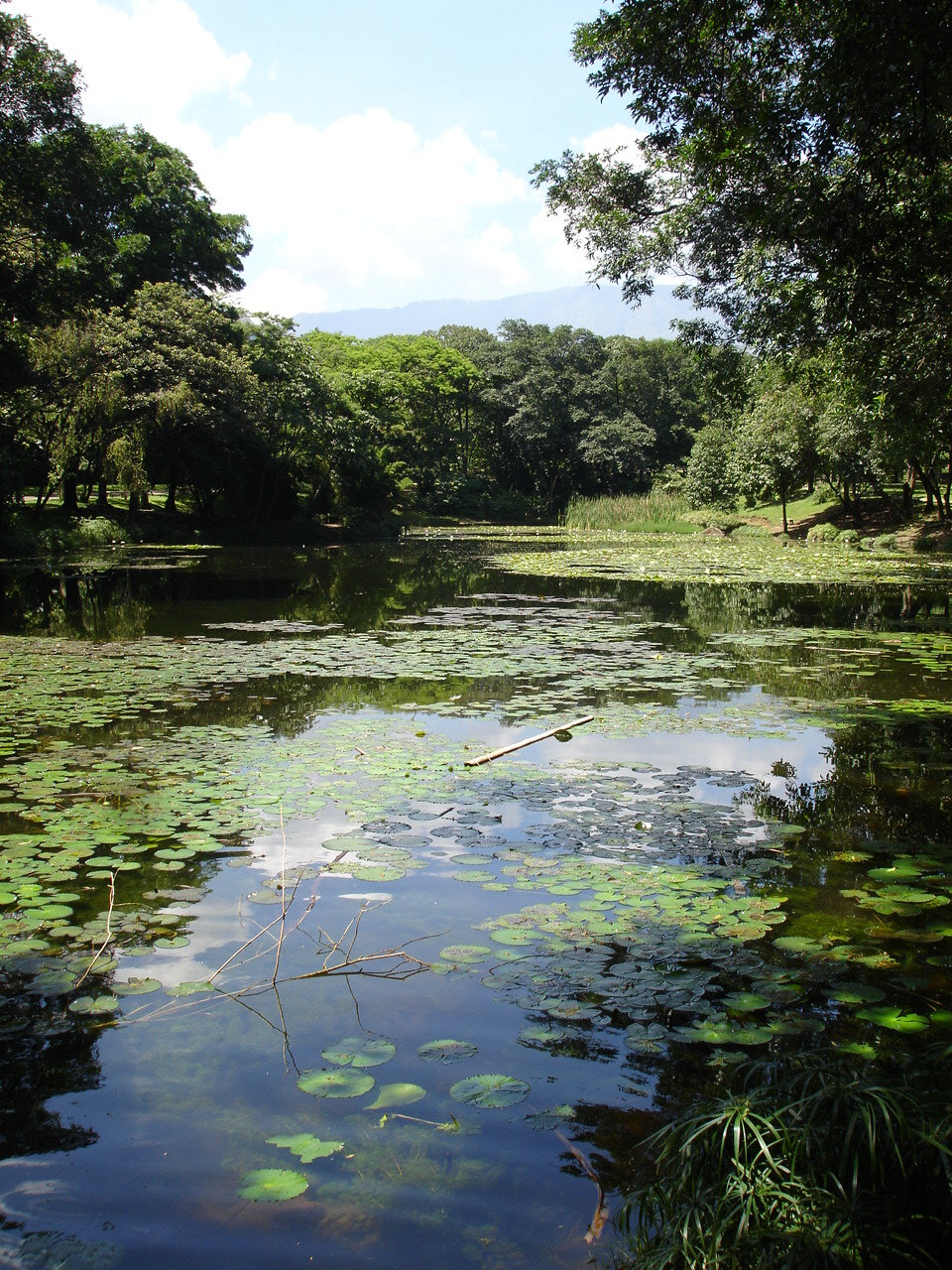
Botanical Garden of Medellín

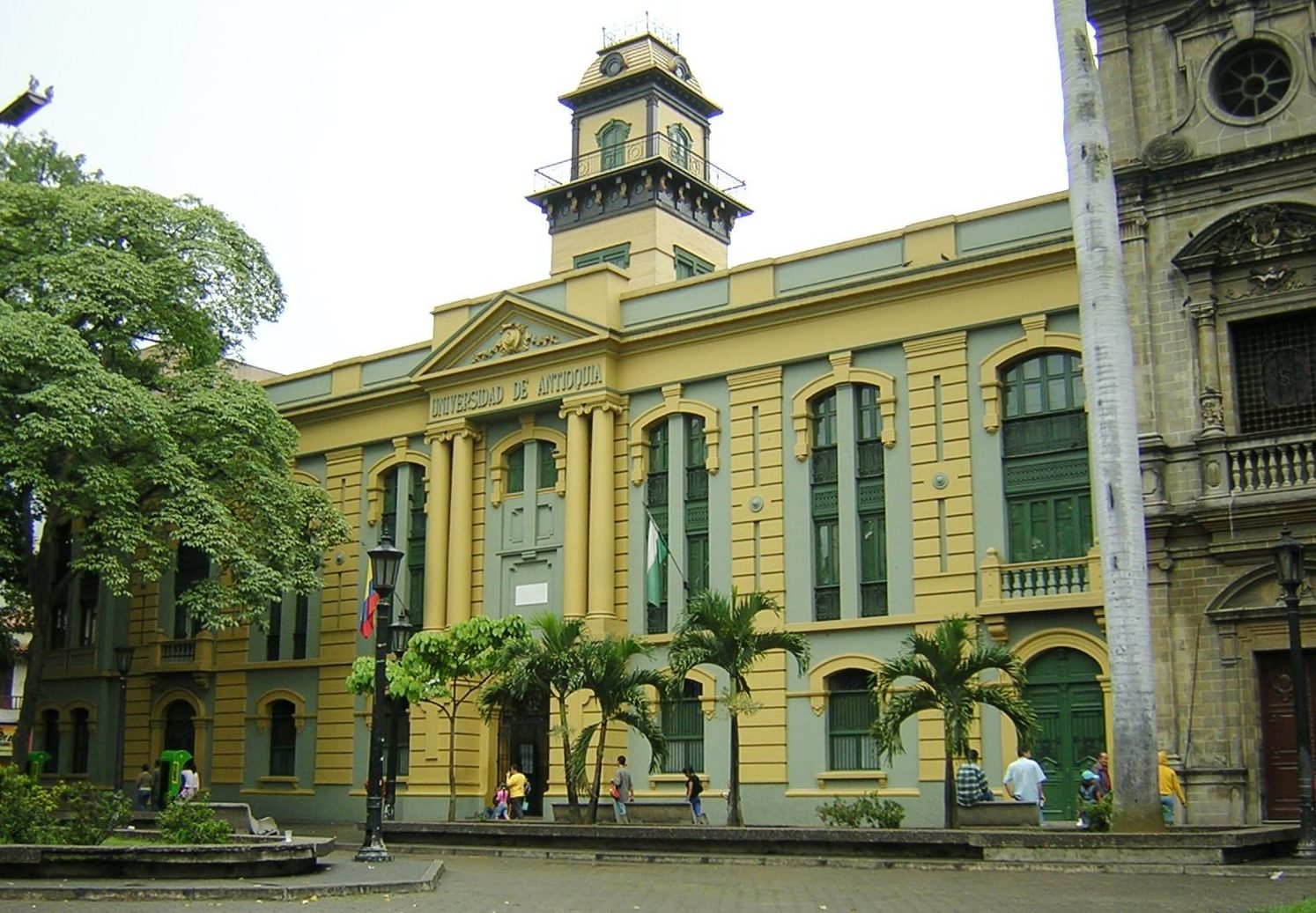
Paraninfo University of Antioquia

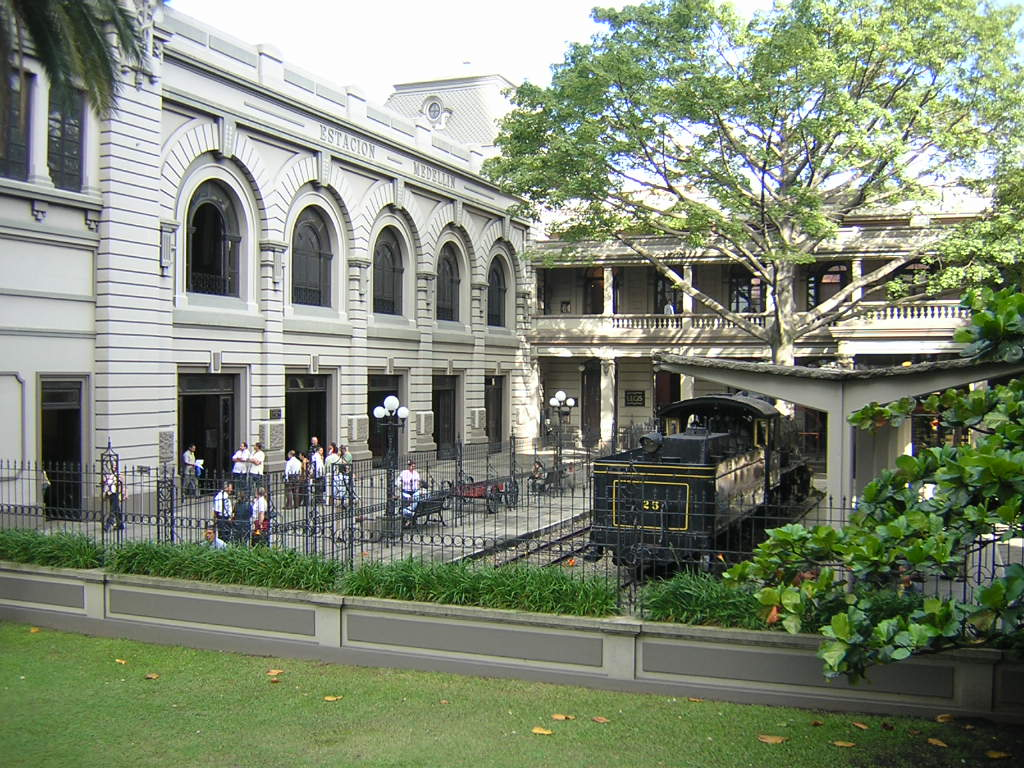
Antique Railway Station

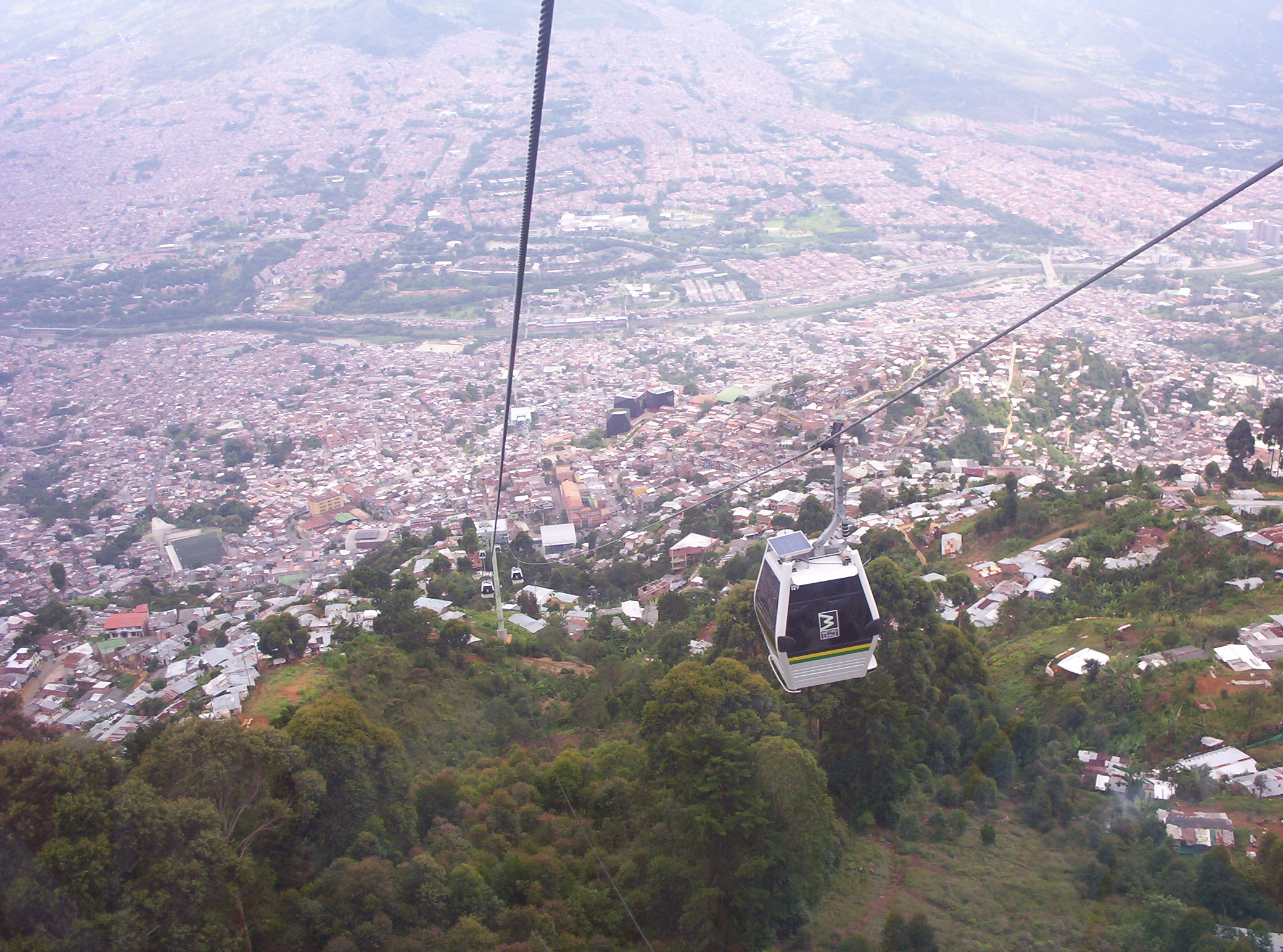
Metrocable

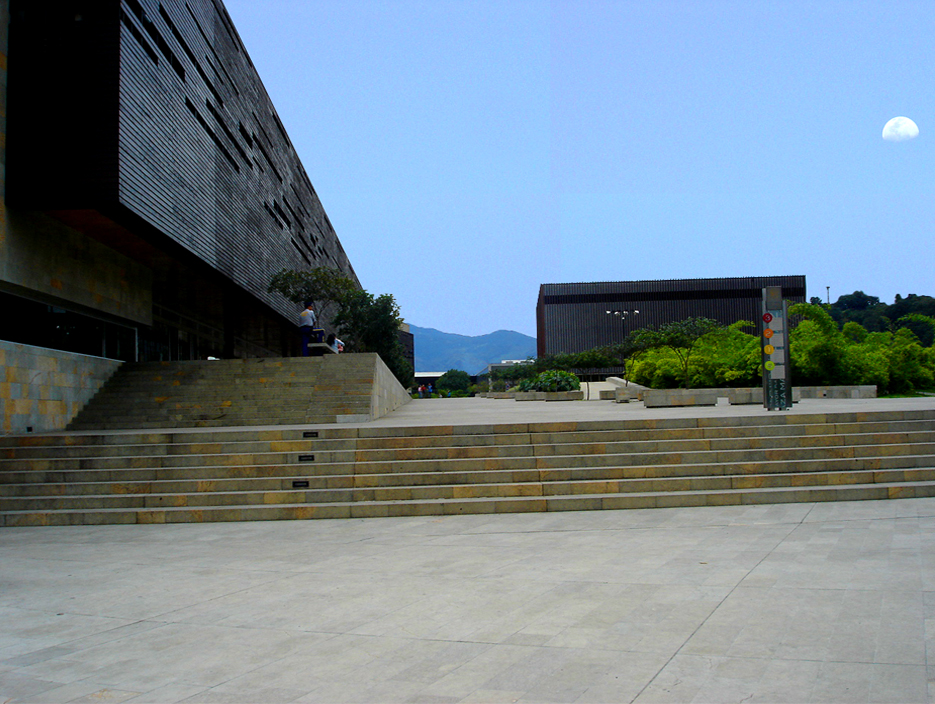
International Center of Business CIC

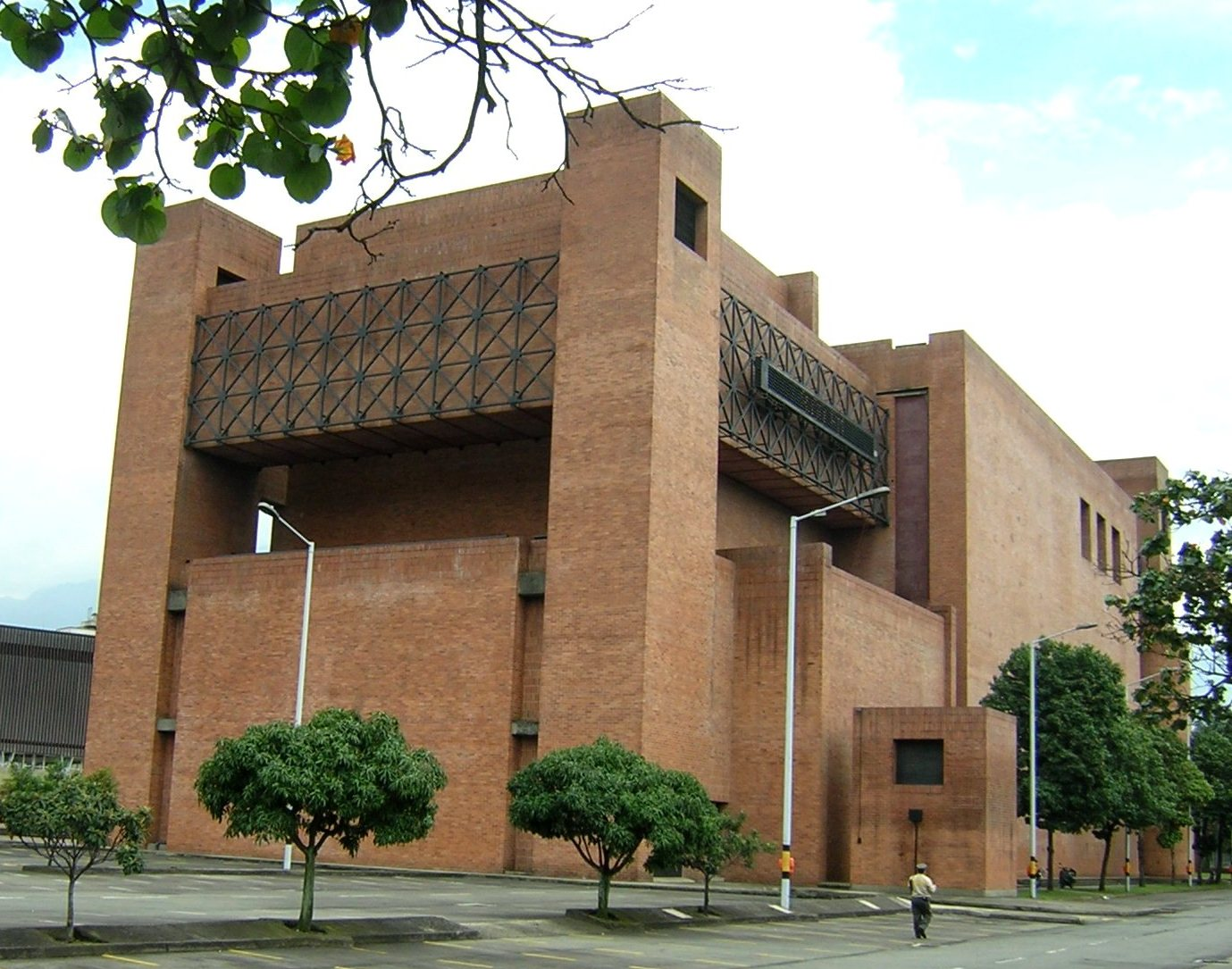
Metropolitan Theatre

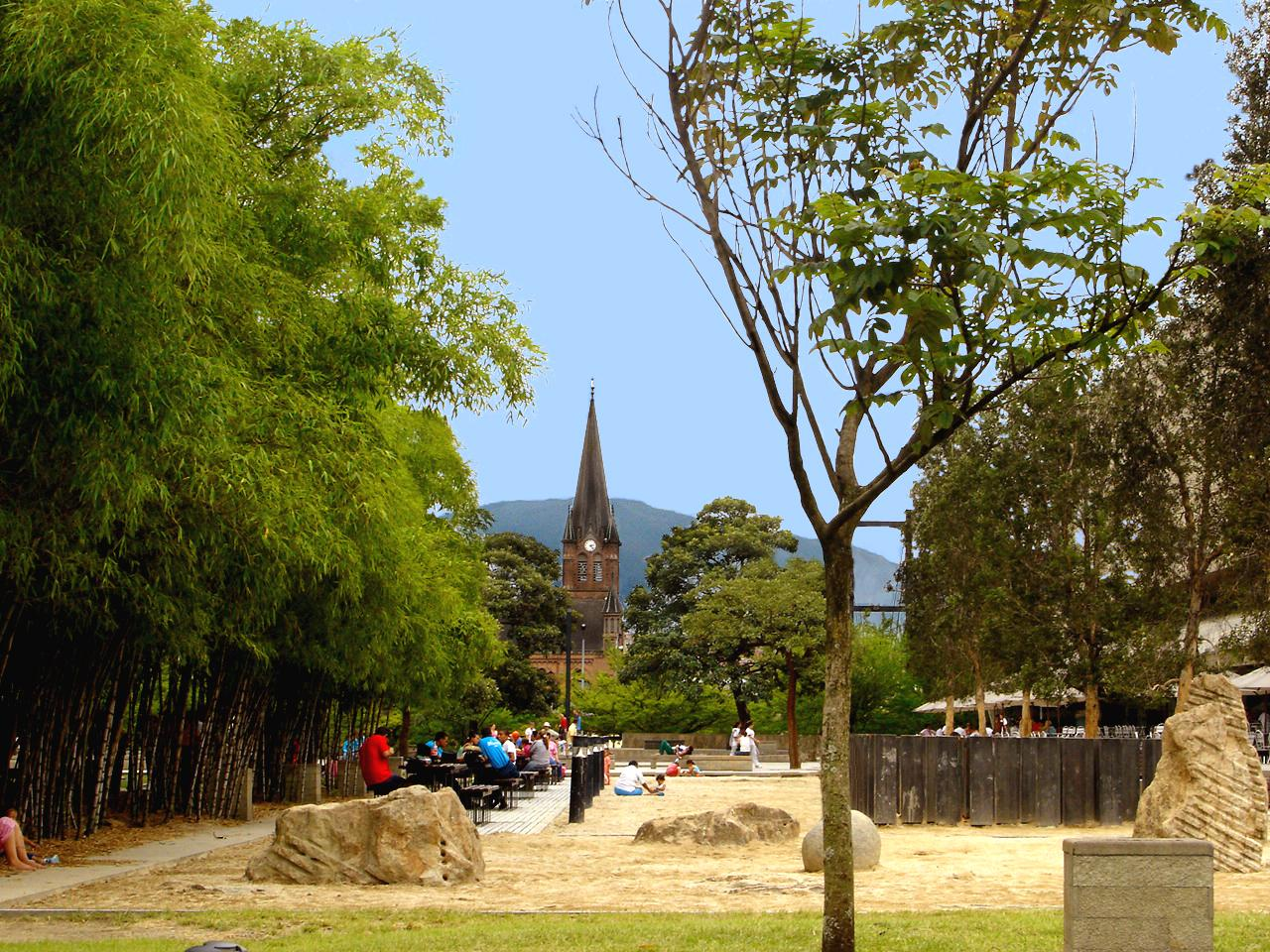
Barefoot Park

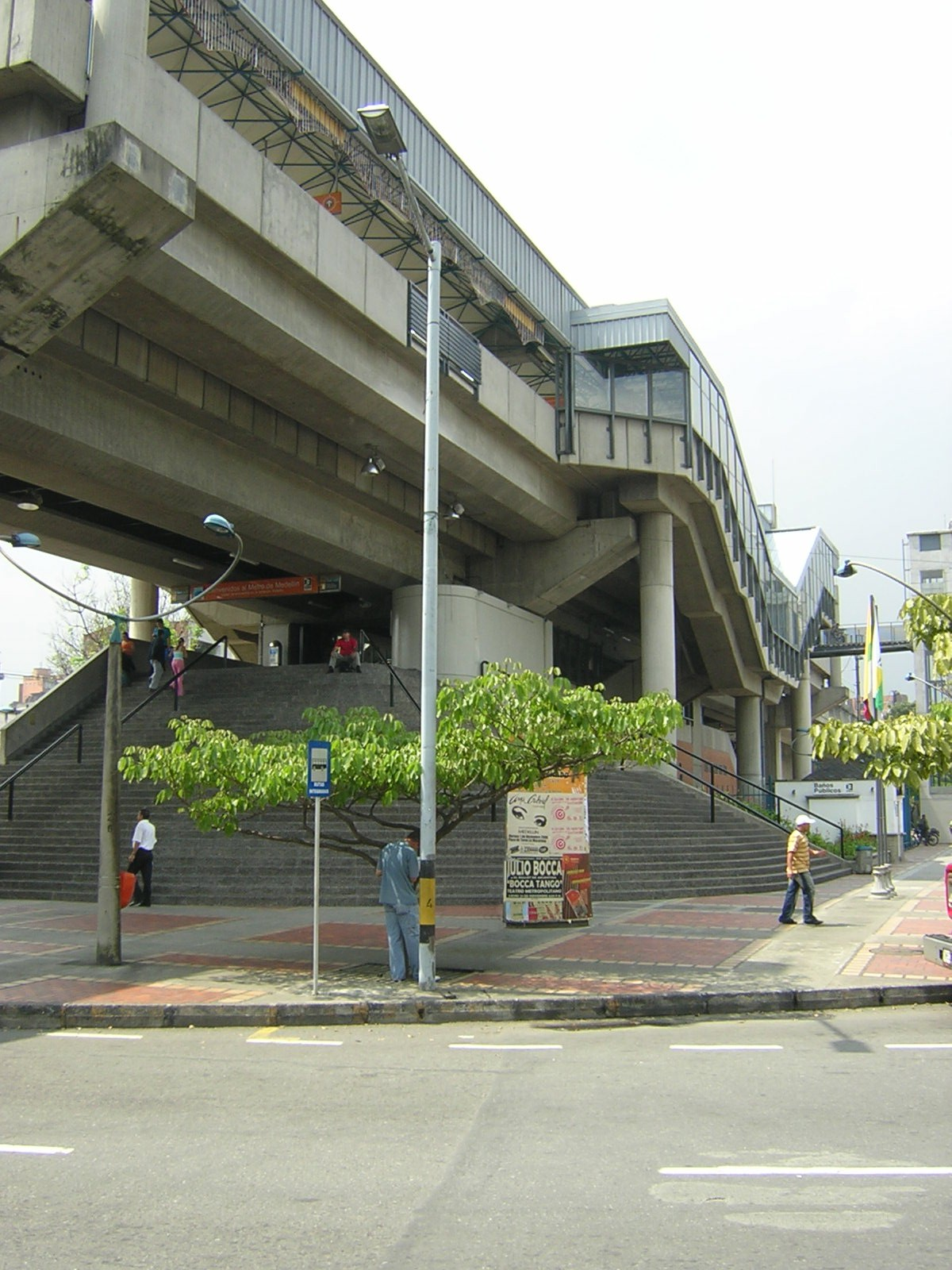
Estadio station

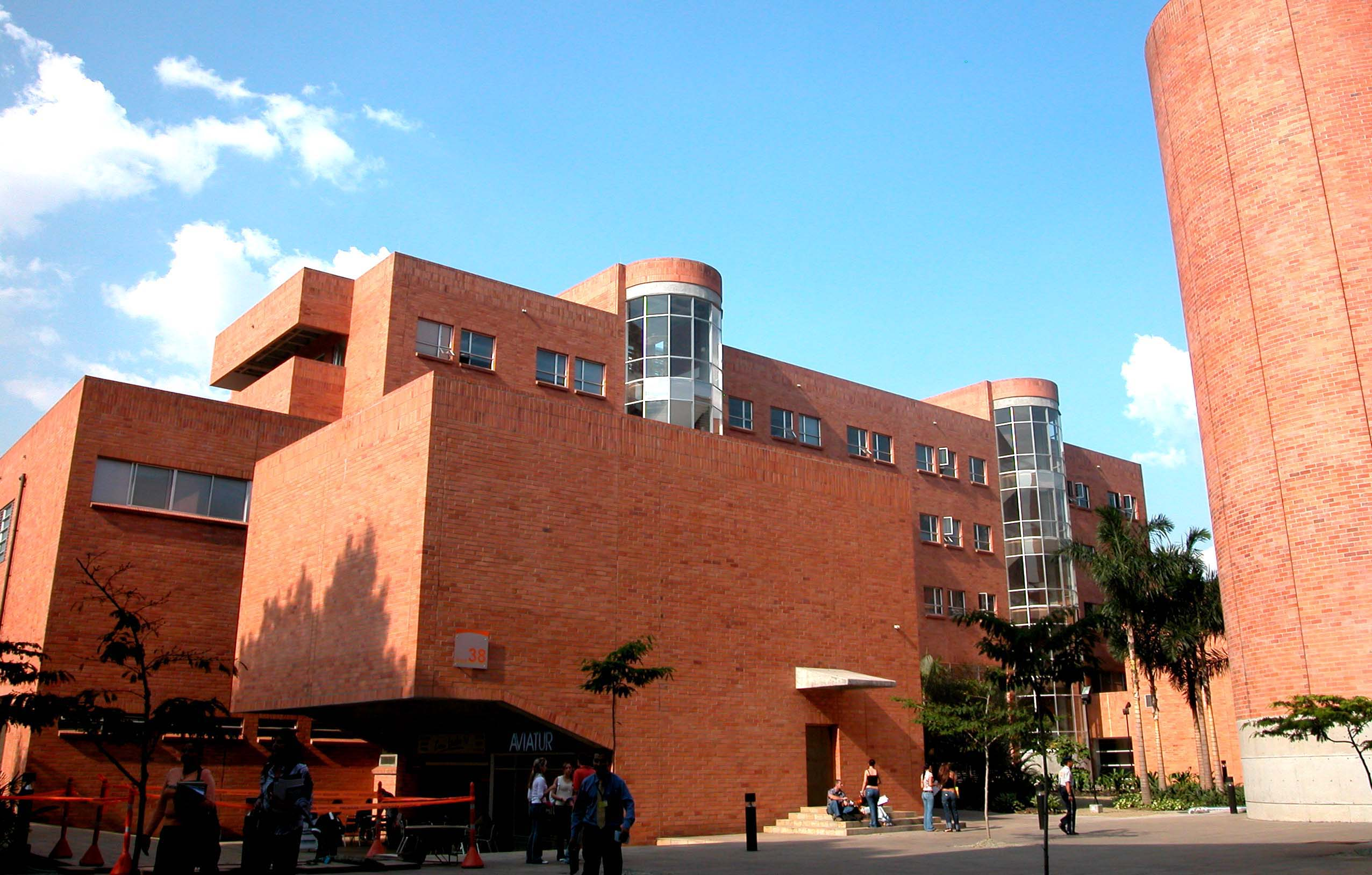
EAFIT University

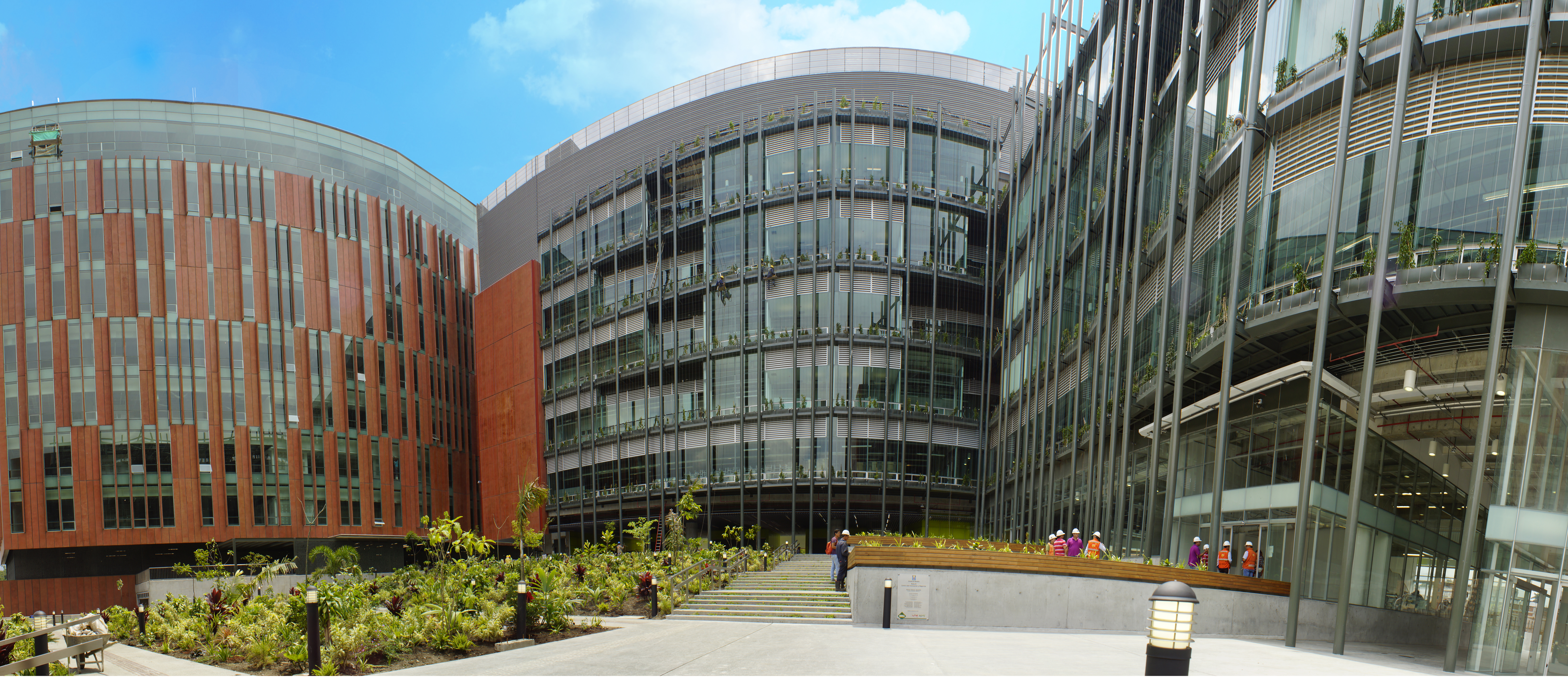
Headquarters of Hewlett-Packard in Route N

== Notable people ==
- Manuela Arbeláez, model on the game show The Price is Right
- J Balvin, singer
- Daniel Bedoya, footballer
- Danna Garcia, actress, model
- Blessd, singer
- Feid, singer
- Fernando Botero, artist
- Jaime R. Echavarría, musician and Governor of Antioquia
- Juanes, singer
- Pablo Escobar, drug lord and smuggler
- Karol G, singer-songwriter
- Maluma, singer
- Paula Garcés, actress
- Isabella Gomez, actress
- Pedro Juan Moreno, racing driver
- Juliana Gutiérrez, politician minister
- Santiago Patiño, footballer
- Sebastián Yatra, singer
- Andrés Escobar, footballer
- Catalina Duque, Miss International 2025
