= La Quintana =

Library park in Medellín, Colombia

La Quintana Library Park
- Parque Biblioteca Tomás Carrasquilla
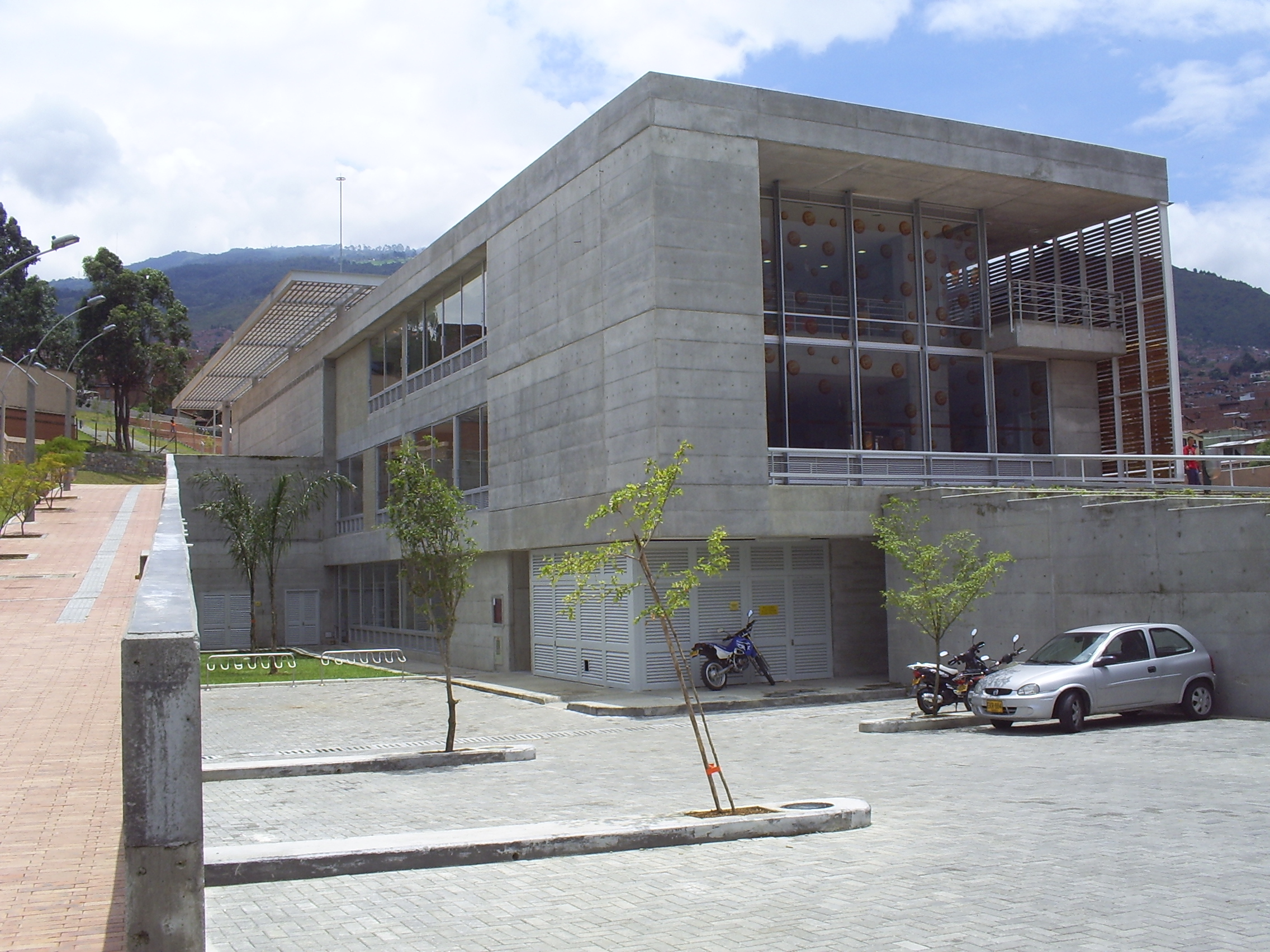
- Exterior view of library
- 6.285621089251711°N 75.58316945064189°W
- Location: Robledo, López De mesa, Medellín, Colombia
- Type: Public Library
- Established: March 2007

Other information
- Website: https://comunasdemedellin.com/bibliotecas-en-las-comunas/

La Quintana, also known as the Parque Biblioteca Tomás Carrasquilla (Tomás Carasquilla Library Park), is a culturally significant library park in Medellín, Colombia. The library was designed by Ricardo La Rotta Caballero and named after Colombian writer Tomás Carrasquilla. The building is 14,800 square feet and includes reading rooms, ludotecas (educational play spaces for children), computers with internet, and terraced architecture with views overlooking Medellín. It is located in the Aures neighborhood in the northwestern quarter of the city.

== History ==
It opened in 2007 and was one of five libraries constructed as part of cultural redevelopment efforts in the city targeted to serve underprivileged communities.

== Design ==
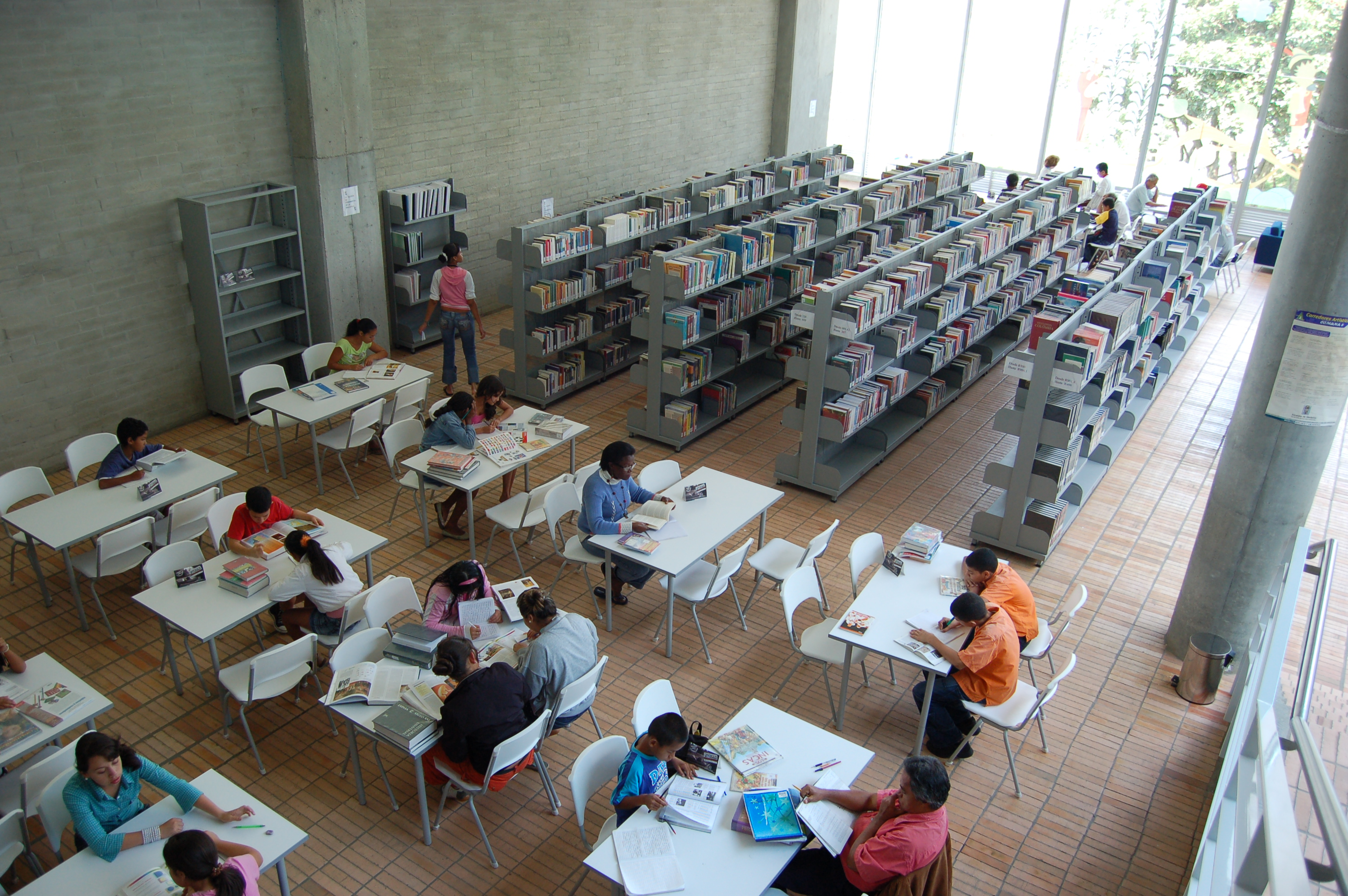
Interior view of library

The library was purposefully located on the basin of La Quintana creek in order to create a central cultural zone that united the surrounding neighborhoods that were naturally separated by La Quintana. The park space was designed as a "public road" that connects with the roads to the different neighborhoods in the area. The library design consists of two giant blocks. The lower block houses the book collection and computer lab in an enclosed space. The upper block in an open-air public space for talking and houses a cafeteria.

== See also ==
- León de Greiff Library
- Spain Library
- Belén Library
- San Javier Library
- List of libraries in Colombia
