= St. Francis Xavier (disambiguation) =

St. Francis Xavier (1506–1552) is a Catholic saint.

St. Francis Xavier may also refer to:

== Places ==
- St. François Xavier, Manitoba, Canada
- Saint-François-Xavier, Paris, France, a church
  - Saint-François-Xavier station, a Paris Metro station
- San Francisco Javier, El Salvador
- São Francisco Xavier, São Paulo state, Brazil
- São Francisco Xavier, Rio de Janeiro, Brazil
- São Francisco Xavier (Lisbon), Portugal

== People ==
- Francis Xavier Bianchi (1743–1815), Italian priest and scholar
- Frances Xavier Cabrini (1850–1917), Italian-American nun

== Other uses ==
- St. Francis Xavier Church (disambiguation)
- List of schools named after Francis Xavier, various colleges and schools

== See also ==
- St. Francis (disambiguation)
- St. Xavier (disambiguation)
- San Xavier (disambiguation)
- Xavier (disambiguation)
- San Javier (disambiguation)
- "San Franciscu Xavier-a, tuji kudd-i Goeam xara", a Konkani hymn
- Forte de São Francisco Xavier de Tabatinga, Brazil
