= San Javier =

San Javier may refer to:

- Francis Xavier (1506–1552), a Roman Catholic saint
- San Javier Library, a library park in Medellín, Colombia

== Places ==
=== Argentina ===
- San Javier, Misiones, a town in the Misiones province
- San Javier, Río Negro Province, a village and municipality in Río Negro province
- San Javier, Santa Fe, a city in Santa Fe province
  - San Javier River (Santa Fe), a side channel of the Paraná River in the province of Santa Fe, Argentina
- San Javier River (Tucumán)

=== Bolivia ===
- San Javier, Beni, a small town
- San Javier, Ñuflo de Chávez, Santa Cruz Department
- San Javier Municipality, Beni, a municipality in Beni Department

=== Chile ===
- San Javier, Chile

=== El Salvador ===
- San Francisco Javier, a municipality in Usulután department

=== Mexico ===
- San Javier, Baja California Sur, a village
  - Misión San Francisco Javier de Viggé-Biaundó, a Spanish mission in San Javier, Baja California Sur, Mexico
- San Javier, Jalisco, a municipality
- San Javier, Sinaloa, birthplace of Senator María Serrano Serrano
- San Javier, Sonora, a town

=== Peru ===
- San Javier de Alpabamba District, Ayacucho

=== Spain ===
- San Javier, Murcia
  - Murcia–San Javier Airport, a military air base and civilian passenger airport

=== Uruguay ===
- San Javier, Uruguay, Río Negro Department

== See also ==
- San Javier Department (disambiguation)
- San Javier Municipality (disambiguation)
- San Javier River (disambiguation)
- San Xavier (disambiguation)
- St. Xavier (disambiguation)
- Javier (disambiguation)
