= Library Park =

Library Park or Library Park Historic District may refer to:

== Brazil ==
- Manguinhos Library Park, library and park complex in Rio de Janeiro, Brazil

== Colombia ==
- Library park (Colombia), libraries with park and public spaces constructed in Medellin, Colombia as part of cultural development efforts and to promote education in underprivileged areas

== United States ==
(by state)

- Phoenix Carnegie Library and Library Park, Phoenix, Arizona, listed on the NRHP in Phoenix, Arizona
- Library Park Historic District (Las Vegas, New Mexico), listed on the NRHP in San Miguel County, New Mexico
- Library Park Historic District (Ogdensburg, New York), listed on the NRHP in New York
- Library Park (Belleville, Wisconsin), listed on the NRHP in Dane County, Wisconsin
- Library Park (Kenosha, Wisconsin), listed on the NRHP in Kenosha County, Wisconsin
- Library Park Historic District (Kenosha, Wisconsin), listed on the NRHP in Kenosha County, Wisconsin
