= Ricardo La Rotta Caballero =

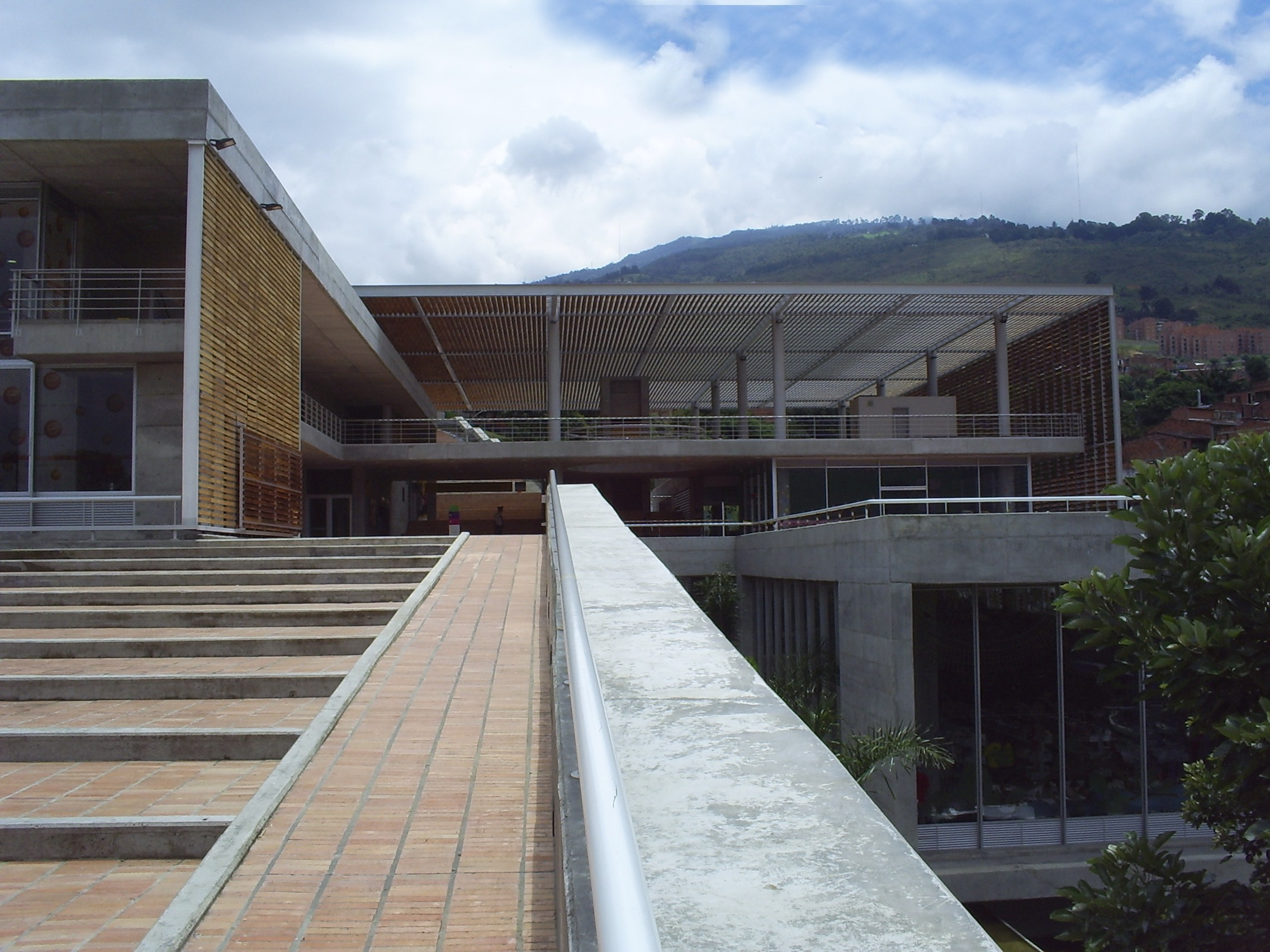
La Quintana Library, designed by La Rotta Caballero

Ricardo La Rotta Caballero is an architect in Bogotá, Colombia and the principal at the La Rotta Arquitectos firm. His work includes La Quintana Library, a library park named after Tomás Carrasquilla in Medellín, Colombia. Along with Architects Juan Manuel López and Ramón Quevedo, La Rotta was selected as an architect for an ecological redevelopment project north of Bogotá. In 2006, La Rotta's work on the project with Quevedo and López on Edifício Compensar in Bogotá which was selected as one of the 10 "projects of the year" by the publication Semana. La Rotta was also involved in the project of the Plaza of Zipaquirá. La Rotta won a design competition for the new Arts faculty building at Javeriana University.

== Education and career ==
La Rotta studied architecture at Javeriana University in Bogotá. He worked with Rogelio Salmona as an urban designer and at the firm of Daniel Bermúdez and Cía. In 2002 he started his own firm, La Rotta Arquitectos (La Rotta Architects). He is also a professor of Urban Design at Javeriana University and at the University of the Andes (Colombia) in Bogotá. His most prominent projects have included Centro Social Calle 94-Compensar, el parque-biblioteca Tomás Carrasquilla (the Tomás Carrasquilla Park and Library), the Jorge Tadeo Lozano Art & Design faculty building at its University Campus in Bogotá and the Arts Faculty main building at Javeriana University.
