= San Javier, Río Negro =

San Javier, Río Negro may refer to the following places:

- San Javier, Río Negro Province, in Argentina
- San Javier, Uruguay, in Río Negro department of Uruguay
