= Library park (Colombia) =

Library building with surrounding green space

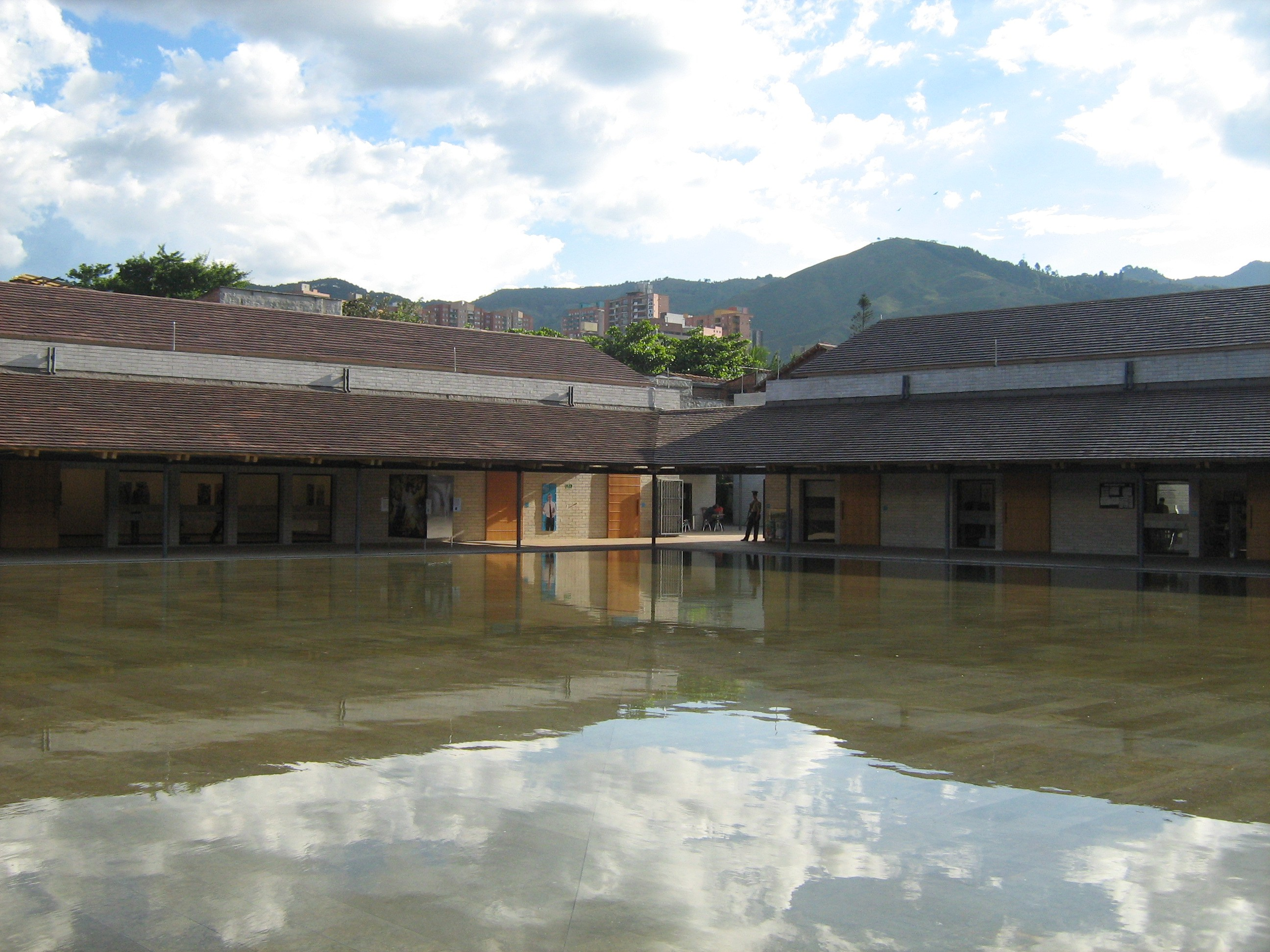
Bethlehem Library Park, designed by Japanese architect Hiroshi Naito.

A library park (Spanish: parque biblioteca) is a term first used in Colombia for an urban complex formed by a combination of a library building with ample surrounding green space for public use. These library parks are strategically located in the periphery of Medellín, a major Colombian city, to address the need for more cultural and education space and public services in less affluent neighborhoods.

According to the Mayor of Medellín, "The library parks are cultural centers for social development that encourage citizen encounters, educational and recreational activities, building groups, the approach to the new challenges in digital culture. And they are also spaces for cultural services that allow cultural creation and strengthening of existing neighborhood organizations."

The popularity of library parks in Colombia and their success in improving the conditions of outer city neighborhoods has helped spread the idea to other countries in Latin America. Notably, Rio de Janeiro's Manguinhos Library Park was inspired by the library parks of Colombia.

== Sites in Colombia ==
=== Original sites (2005-2008) ===
The initial proposal specified five library parks:

- Spain Library Park/Parque Biblioteca España - Comuna 1 - Popular
- La Quintana Library Park/Parque Biblioteca Tomás Carrasquilla - Comuna 7 - Robledo
- León de Greiff Library/La Ladera Parque Biblioteca - Comuna 8 - Villa Hermosa
- San Javier Library Park/Parque Biblioteca San Javier - Comuna 13 - San Javier
- Bethlehem Library Park/Parque Biblioteca Belén - Comuna 16 - Belén

=== Additional sites (2009-2011) ===
The success of the original proposal prompted five additional library parks, benefiting around 784,000 people from all corners of the city. They join the Public Library System of Medellin and came into use in 2011:

- Library Park Doce de Octubre - Comuna 6 - Doce de Octubre
- Las Estancias Library Park
- Guayabal Library Park - Comuna 15 - Guayabal
- San Cristobal Library Park - Corregimiento de San Cristóbal
- Library Park San Antonio de Prado - Corregimiento de San Antonio de Prado

== Architecture ==
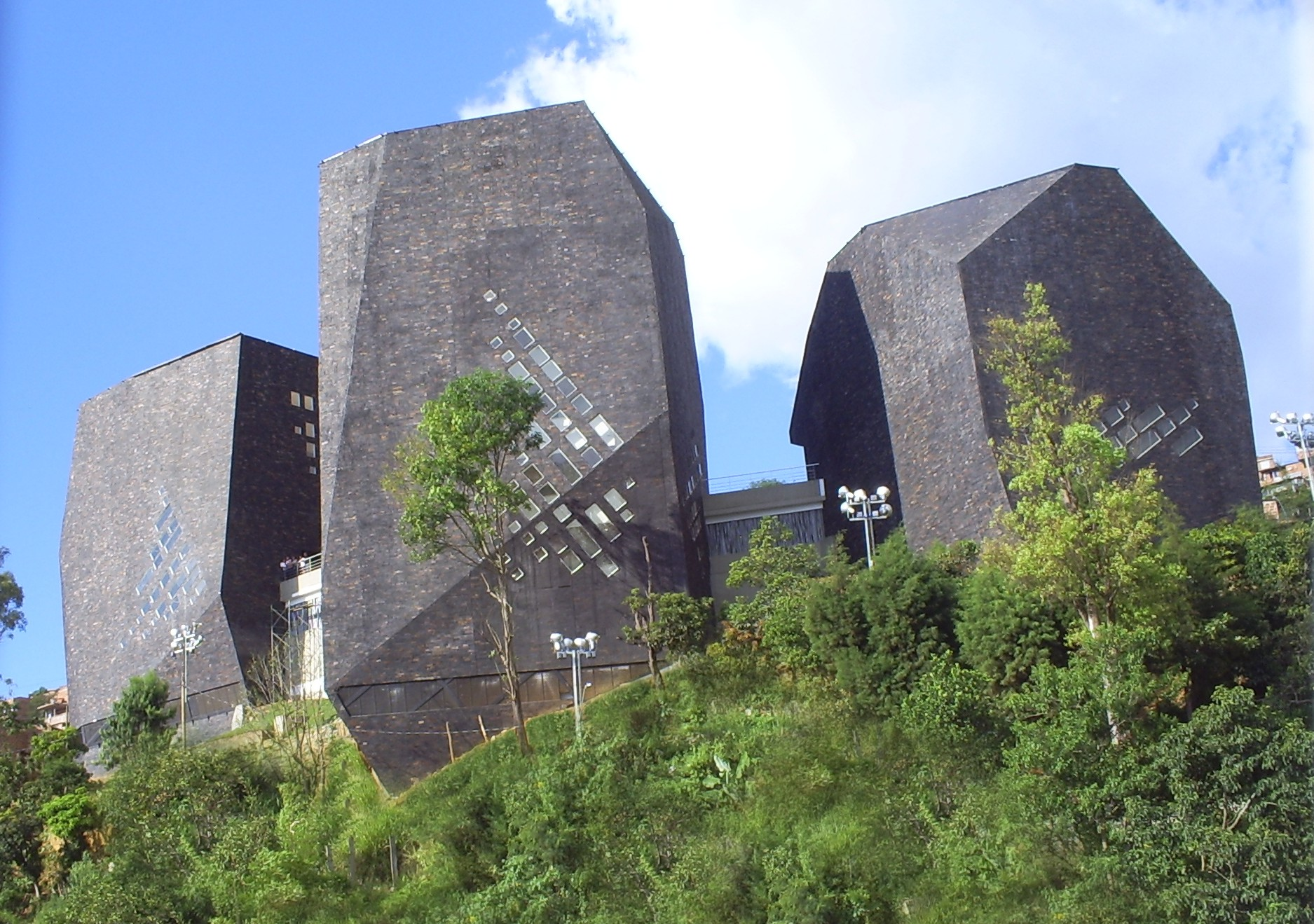
Spain Library Park

Architects from around the world left their mark on this project, among them Giancarlo Mazzanti, Ricardo La Rotta Caballero, and Hiroshi Naito.

The architecture of the Spain Library Park/Parque Biblioteca España, added to the visit of King Juan Carlos and his wife Queen Sofia, has become a symbol of all library parks. It is a large construction that resembles three fallen rocks or meteorites from space and have become icons that can be recognized from a distance, as well as serving as a viewpoint of the city. At night, the three "rocks" or buildings light up.

== See also ==
- List of libraries in Colombia
