= Bartolomé Calvo Library =

Library in Cartagena, Colombia

- Biblioteca Bartolomé Calvo
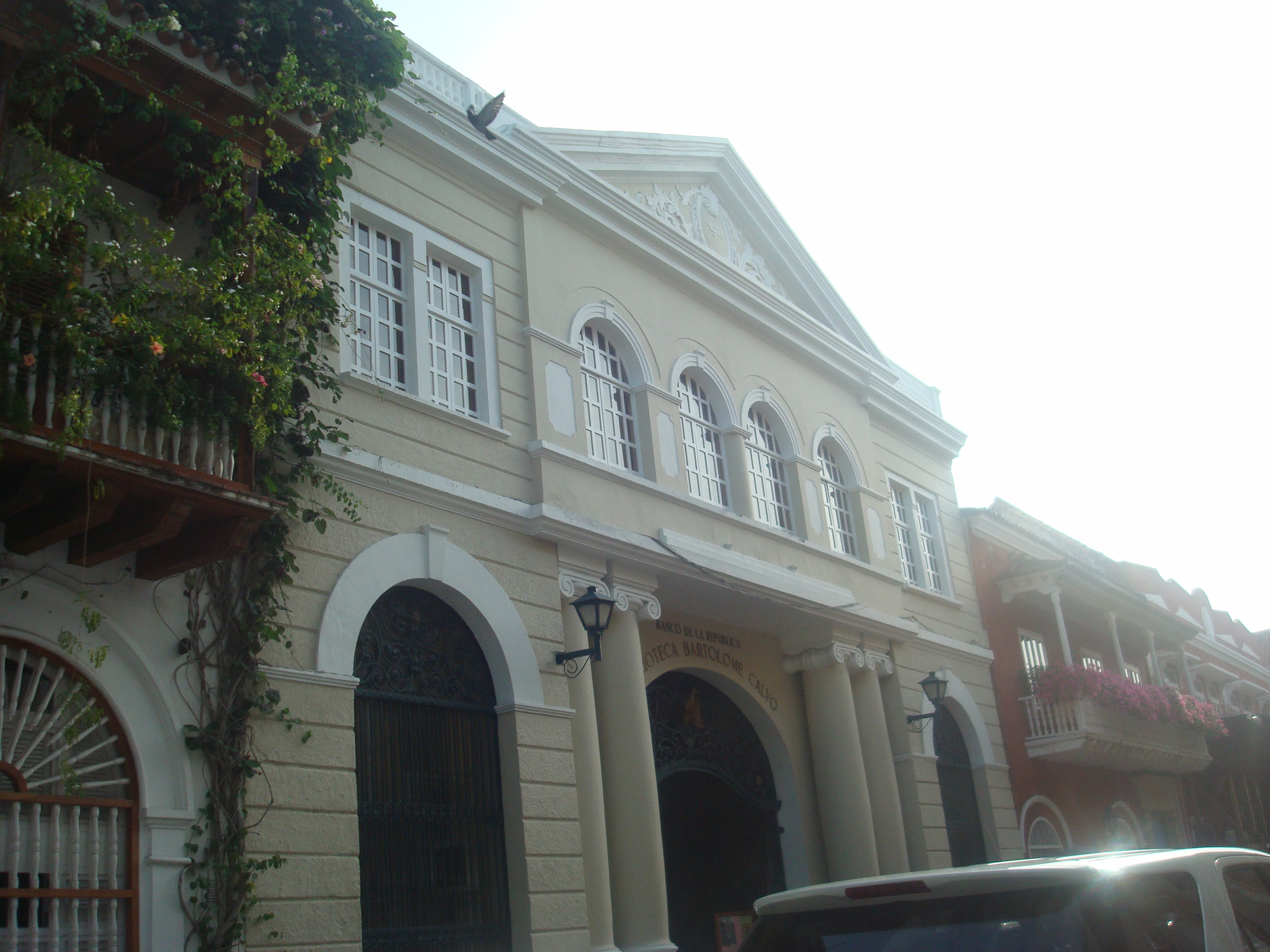
- 10°25′22″N 75°33′07″W
- Location: Cartagena
- Established: 1843; 183 years ago

The Bartolomé Calvo Library (Spanish: Biblioteca Bartolomé Calvo) is a Colombian library located in the Santo Domingo Square, Cartagena. The library was named after President Bartolomé Calvo. It is one of the most popular libraries in the country.

== History ==
The library first opened in 1843, back when Colombia was the Republic of New Granada. In 1907, the library was relocated into a building in the Santo Domingo Square, also known as the walled city, that formerly held a bank. The library reopened on 30 October 1981, after Banco de la República acquired the library on a loan and invested in the renovation for the library. The library's collection is constantly expanding and by 2006 it had nearly 67,000 volumes.

== See also ==
- List of libraries in Colombia
