= Daniel Bermúdez =

Colombian architect

Daniel Bermúdez Samper
- Born: 1950 (age 75–76); Bogotá, D.C., Colombia
- Education: University of the Andes, (BArch, 1973)
- Occupation: Architect
- Practice: Daniel Bermúdez Y Cía. Ltd. Arq. www.danielbermudezarquitecto.com
- Projects: Tintal Public Library (Bogotá, 2000)

Daniel Bermúdez Samper (born 1950) is a Colombian architect, and Professor at the Faculty of Architecture and Design of the University of the Andes.

Daniel was born in 1950 in Bogotá. His father was modern architect Guillermo Bermúdez Umaña and his mother was Graciela Samper Gnecco. He is an alumnus of the University of the Andes, where he graduated in architecture in 1973.

Since 1975 he has been a faculty member of the Universidad de Los Andes teaching at the Department of Architecture and Design. He is currently coordinator of the Degree project course (BA), part of the faculty team in charge of thesis projects and a member of the Architecture, City and Education (ACE) research team.

== Awards ==
He received the Bienal Colombiana de Arquitectura (1992, 1998 and 2004), the Asocreto Concrete Excellence Award (1998, 2002, 2004)), and the XIII Premio Obras Cemex award (2004).

Bermúdez critiqued the work of fellow Colombian architect Giancarlo Mazzanti.

Daniel Bermúdez Samper has been an independent architect since 1975.

== Projects ==
- Master plan for the Universidad de los Andes campus including Alberto Lleras Camargo and Carlos Pacheco Devia buildings
- library, auditorium, gallery, postgraduate building and square for the Universidad Jorge Tadeo Lozano
- He was director of the collaborative city planning project Ciudad Salitre
- Two of Bogotá's large scale public libraries
- Cultural Centre Julio Mario Santo Domingo
Selected works
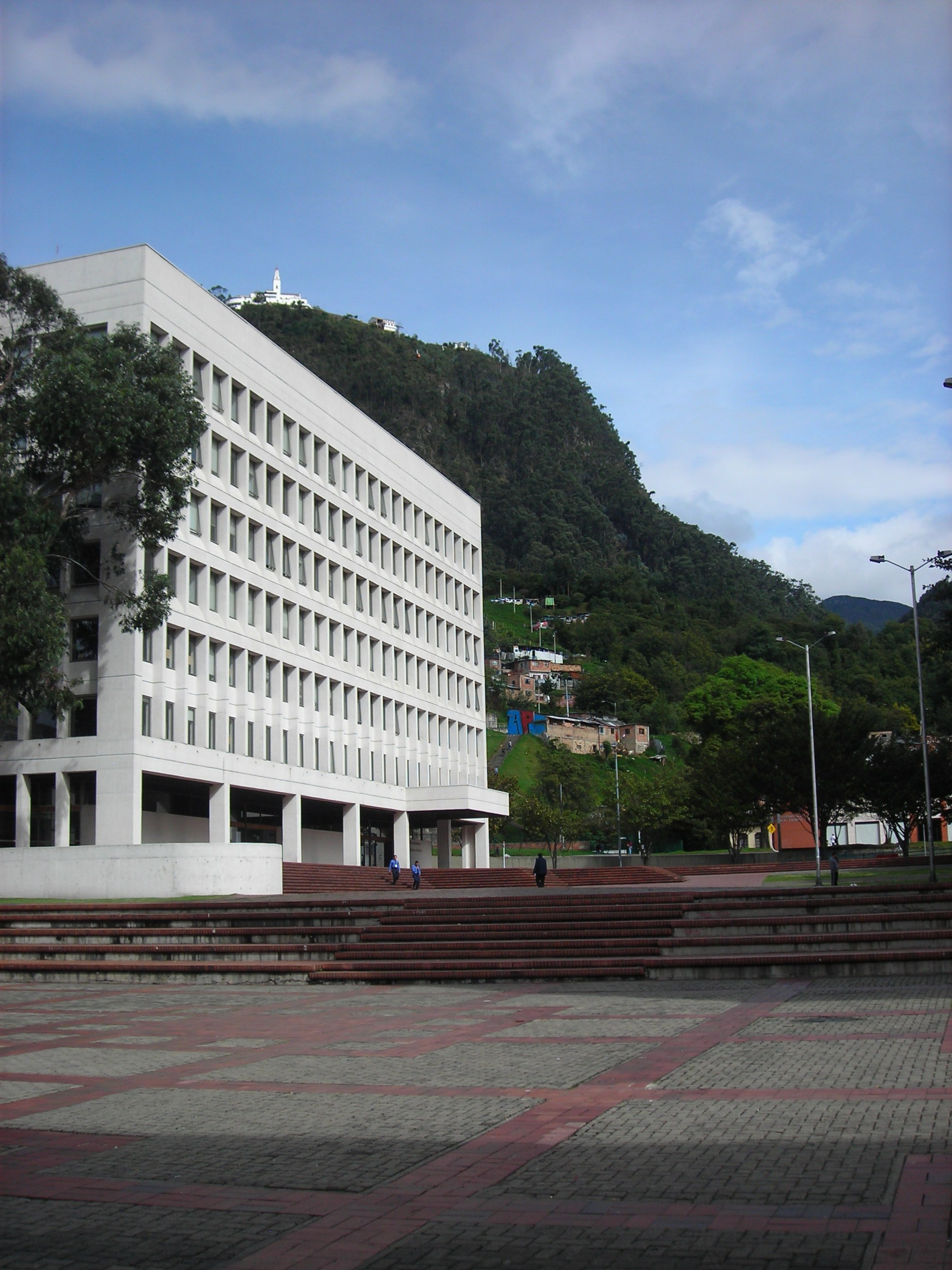
Campus Building at the Jorge Tadeo Lozano University.

== Other activities ==
Daniel Bermúdez Samper was a member of the Holcim Awards jury for region Latin America in 2008.

== Personal life ==
Daniel was born to Guillermo Bermúdez Umaña, also an architect, and his wife Graciela Samper Gnecco. He married Inés Obregón Martínez de Irujo, also an architect, on 18 June 1981.
