= National Library of Colombia =

National library in Bogota, Colombia

- Biblioteca Nacional de Colombia

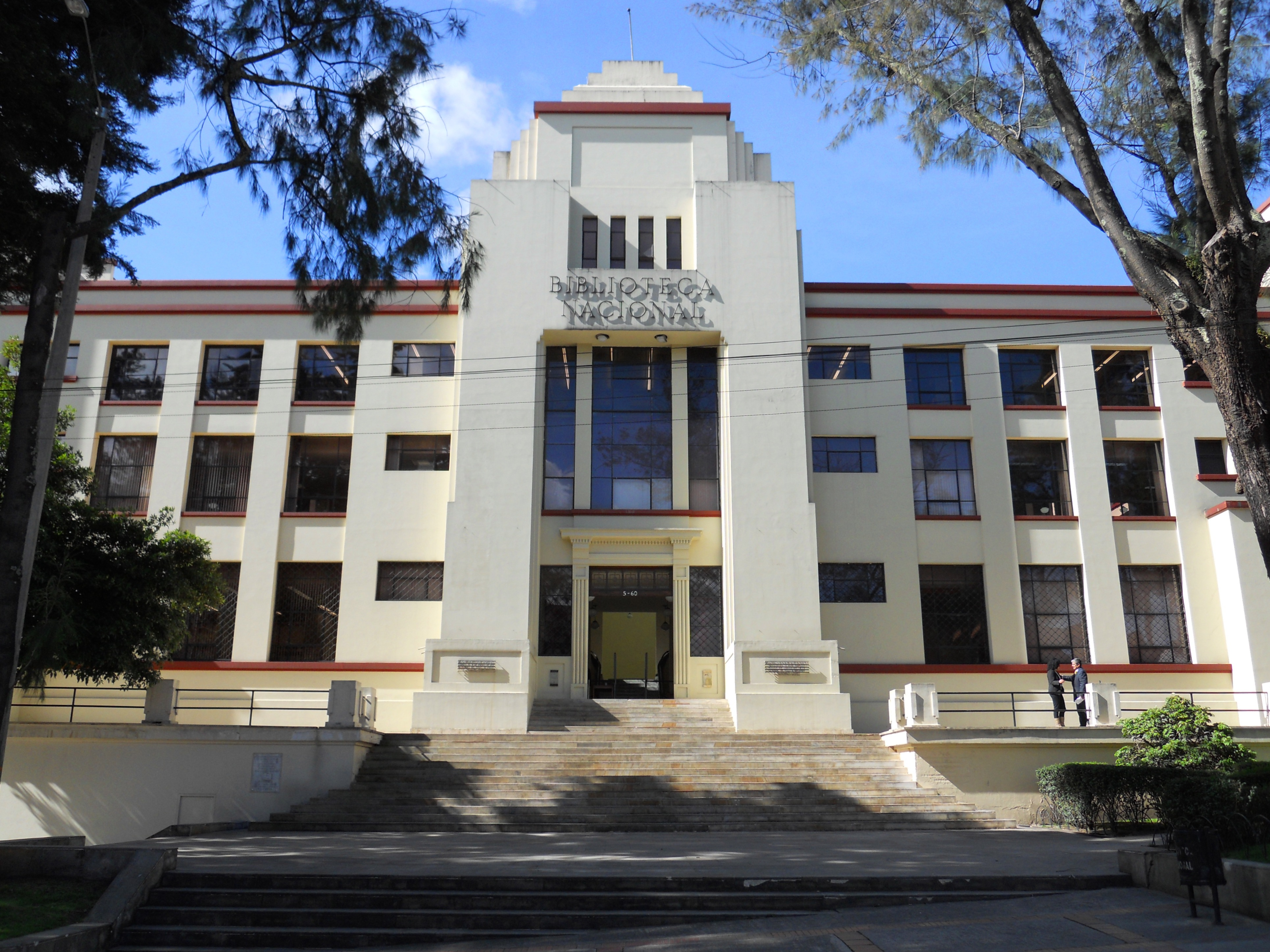
- 4°36′34.39″N 74°4′7.14″W
- Location: Calle 24 N° 5- 60; Bogotá, Colombia
- Type: National Library
- Established: 9 January 1777; 249 years ago

Other information
- Website: www.bibliotecanacional.gov.co

The National Library of Colombia (Spanish: Biblioteca Nacional de Colombia) is a national library located in Bogotá, Colombia. The library is a dependency of the Colombian Ministry of Culture.

== Founding and history ==
The National Library of Colombia is generally considered to be the oldest national library in the Americas. It was founded in 1777 by Viceroy Manuel de Guirior, in the city of Bogotá. The original collection of the library consisted of books expropriated from the Jesuit community, which had been expelled from all the dominions of the Spanish Empire, as a result of the 1767 order of King Charles III of Spain. In 1825, due to the work of Francisco de Paula Santander, the library was established at the campus of the Colegio de San Bartolomé and received its current name. On March 25, 1834, the first legal deposit law was decreed, which required that all copies of printed material in the country be sent to the library for storage. This law set the objective of the library, which then became the sole entity in charge of maintaining the bibliographic heritage of the nation.

Bibliographic wealth of Colombia (incunabular, prints, sound recordings and audio-visual work of great historical and artistic value), located in the southeast corner of Independence Park. It was founded January 9, 1777, inaugurated in 1938 and remodeled in 1978 by architect Jacques Mosseri, except decorative elements and façade design remained the same.

The two statues on both sides of calle 25 access, high relief at the attic, sign materials mixture and windows ornamentation were abolished. Four story building. On the first floor are the general reading rooms, kardex, exhibitions, music, classification, among other. The second floor houses hemerotheca and researchers, and the third and fourth floors have storage and administrative offices.

Provides legal publications storage, official publications trade, guided visits, user card, photogram reproduction, works and photographs photocopying, and photograph or film works. As part of valuable donations received, Manuel del Socorro Rodríguez, Miguel Antonio Caro, Rufino José Cuervo, Eduardo Santos and Germán Arciniegas are the most important.

== Mission ==
The library's mission is:

Garantizar la recuperación, preservación y acceso a la memoria colectiva del país, representada por el patrimonio bibliográfico y hemerográfico en cualquier soporte físico; así como la promoción y fomento de las bibliotecas públicas, la planeación y diseño de políticas relacionadas con la lectura, y la satisfacción de necesidades de información indispensables para el desarrollo individual y colectivo de los colombianos...

To guarantee the recovery of, preservation of, and access to the collective memory of the country, represented by the bibliographic and periodical heritage and in any form; so as to promote and foment public libraries, the planning and design of policies related to reading, and the satisfaction of the indispensable need for information for the individual and collective development of Colombians...

In addition, according to a history of the library, the library also functions as a training center for librarians in Colombia as well as a source of books for other countries' libraries.

== Functions ==
According to a decree of the Senate of Colombia, the library's stated functions are:

- To advise the Ministry of Culture as it concerns the formulation of policies on the bibliographic and periodical national heritage
- To guide the plans and programs about creation, promotion, and strengthening of public libraries and the complementary services that are rendered by them
- To direct and coordinate the national network of public libraries.
- To collect, organize, increase, conserve, preserve, protect, record, and spread the bibliographic and periodical heritage of the nation, sustained in different mediums of information.
- To plan and design policies related to reading and its contribution to the development of the education and intellect of the Colombian people
- To design, organize, and develop the bibliographic heritage to contribute to the strengthening of the national identity
- To establish and maintain relations with national and international organizations, with the goal of promoting and developing programs of popular culture and cultural exchange together, in the themes related to books and reading
- To provide advice to, and collaboration with, different scientific, cultural, and educational organizations that develop programs of investigation and cultural diffusion

== Law of legal deposit ==
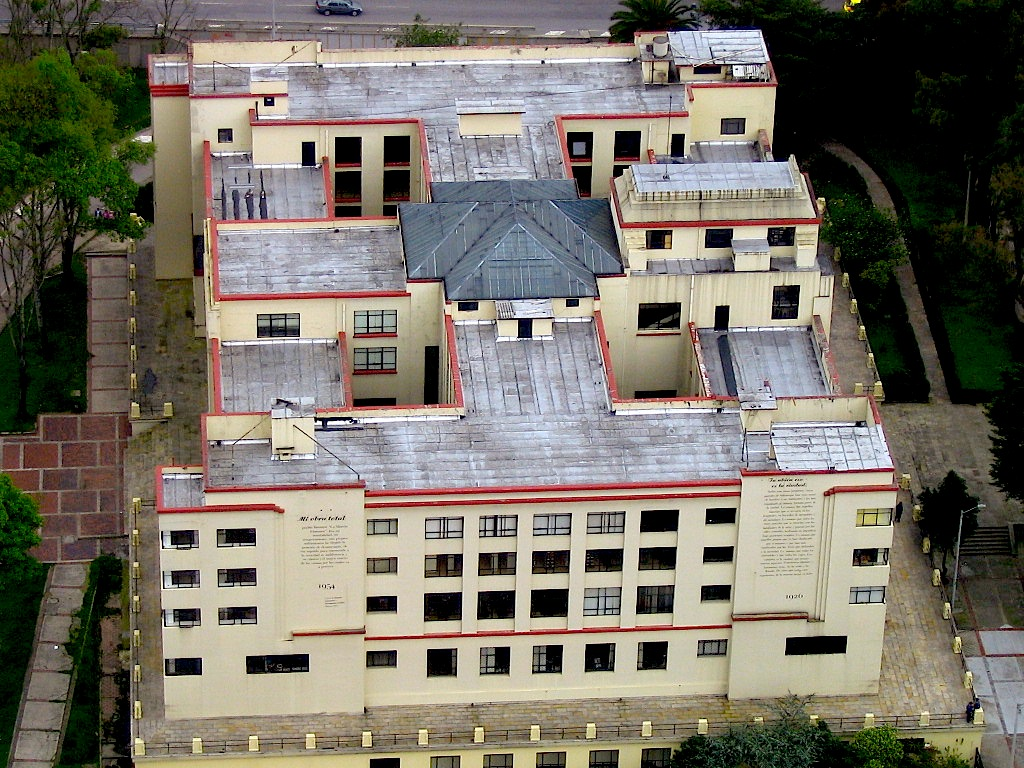
The National Library from above

The law of legal deposit is regulated by Law 44 of 1993, the statutory Decree No. 460 of March 16, 1999, and the Decree 2150 of 1995. These laws and decrees are specifically about the National Library of Colombia. The creators of printed works, as well as audiovisual, audio, and video productions, should supply the library with a specified number of copies of the works, whether they were produced within the Colombian territory or imported.

- For printed works, two copies of each of the works produced within the national territory should be delivered to the National Library of Colombia; one copy to the Biblioteca del Congreso de la República de Colombia (Library of the Congress of the Republic of Colombia), and one copy to the Central Library of the Universidad Nacional de Colombia (National University of Colombia), excepting a few cases in which the high cost of the edition or the short duration of publication makes it possible to deliver fewer copies.
- For audiovisual and audio works, as well as for published works that have been imported, only one copy needs to be delivered to the National Library.

== Catalog ==
Due to the legal deposit law and many charitable donations, the National Library has a large catalog of publications. The collection contains 47 incunabula, 610 volumes of manuscripts and other publications of "rare and curious" books, particularly purchased from or donated by personalities from the political and social life of Colombia, including the collections of Eduardo Santos, German Arciniegas, Jorge Isaacs, Manuel Ancízar, Marco Fidel Suárez, Miguel Antonio Caro, and Rufino José Cuervo among others. The library also possesses publications of the United Nations Library, and pictorial works of historical value like the watercolors of the Chorography Commission. A large quantity of audio recordings comes from the legal deposit law, which has also allowed the library to possess a general collection of the majority of the publications made in the country since the year 1830 as well as a newspaper library with publications of priceless value, like the Aviso de Terremoto, considered the premiere periodical publication in the Republic of Colombia.

The total collection of the Biblioteca Nacional de Colombia exceeds 2,000,000 volumes. Of this, approximately 25% was acquired through the beforementioned legal deposit laws. The other books have mostly come from donations.

== See also ==
- Asociación de Estados Iberoamericanos para el Desarrollo de las Bibliotecas Nacionales de Iberoamérica
- List of libraries in Colombia
