= San Javier Department =

San Javier Department may refer to:

- San Javier Department, Córdoba
- San Javier Department, Misiones
- San Javier Department, Santa Fe

== See also ==
- San Javier (disambiguation)
