= St. Xavier =

St. Xavier or St. Xavier's may refer to:

- St. Francis Xavier (1506–1552), a Spanish Roman Catholic saint
- St. Xavier, Montana, a census-designated place in the United States
- St. Xavier's Church, Kottar, a church in Tamil Nadu, India
- St. Xavier's Church, Peyad, a church in Kerala, India
- St. Xavier's School, Delhi, a school in Delhi, India
- St. Xavier's University, Kolkata, a Jesuit university in New Town, Kolkata, India
- St. Xavier's College, Kolkata, a private Catholic college in Kolkata, India
- St. Xavier's College, Mumbai, a private Catholic college in Mumbai, India

== See also ==
- List of schools named after Francis Xavier
- St. Francis Xavier (disambiguation)
- St. Francis Xavier Church (disambiguation)
- San Javier (disambiguation)
- San Xavier (disambiguation)
