= List of libraries in Colombia =

This is a list of libraries in Colombia.

== Libraries by department ==
=== Antioquia ===
- Biblioteca del Tercer Piso, Santo Domingo, est.1894
- Biblioteca Diego Echavarría Misas, Itagüí (in Spanish)
- Biblioteca José Félix de Restrepo, Envigado (in Spanish)

Medellín

- Biblioteca de la Universidad de Antioquia (in Spanish)
- Biblioteca EPM network (in Spanish)
- Biblioteca Luis Echavarría Villegas (in Spanish)
- Biblioteca pública Piloto, (in Spanish), est.1954
- Library park (Colombia), Medellín
  - Bethlehem Library, Medellín
  - Biblioteca de España (Medellín)
  - La Quintana, Medellín
  - León de Greiff Library, Medellín
  - San Javier Library, Medellín

=== Arauca ===
- Biblioteca Pública Municipal de Arauca Raul Loyo Rojas

=== Atlántico ===
- Biblioteca del Centro Cultural Comfamiliar Atlántico, Barranquilla (in Spanish)
- Biblioteca Piloto del Caribe, Barranquilla (in Spanish)
- Biblioteca Pública Departamental Meira Delmar, Barranquilla (in Spanish)

=== Bogotá ===
See also: List of libraries in Bogota (in Spanish)

- BibloRed network, Bogota
- Luis Ángel Arango Library
- National Library of Colombia, est.1777
- Olegario Rivera Public Library
- Pontificia Universidad Javeriana libraries
- Tintal library
- Tunal library
- Virgilio Barco Library

=== Bolívar ===
- Bartolomé Calvo Library, Cartagena

=== Boyacá ===
- Biblioteca Pública Municipal Raúl Rodríguez Perilla, Macanal

=== Caldas ===
- University of Caldas library, Manizales

=== Caquetá ===
- Biblioteca Pública Municipal de Florencia

=== Casanare ===
- Biblioteca Pública Departamental De Casanare, Yopal

=== Cauca ===
- University of Cauca library, Popayan

=== Cesar ===
- Biblioteca Pública Kankuaka, Valledupar

=== Chocó ===
- Biblioteca Pública Municipal Teresa Martínez de Varela, Quibdó

=== Córdoba ===
- Biblioteca Pública Municipal Luis Felipe Pineda, Chinú

=== Cundinamarca ===
- Biblioteca pública municipal Albán Cundinamarca, Albán (in Spanish)
- Biblioteca pública municipal Francisco Samper Madrid (in Spanish)
- Red Municipal de Bibliotecas Públicas de Soacha Joaquín Piñeros Corpas, Soacha (in Spanish)

=== Guainía ===
- Biblioteca Pública Municipal Princesa Inírida

=== Guaviare ===
- Biblioteca Pública Rural De Charras, San José del Guaviare

=== Huila ===
- Biblioteca Departamental Olegario Rivera, Neiva (in Spanish)

=== La Guajira ===
- Biblioteca pública Miguel Ángel López, Maicao (in Spanish)

=== Magdalena ===
- Biblioburro, travelling library in Magdalena
- Biblioteca Pública Municipal Remedios La Bella, Aracataca

=== Meta ===
- Biblioteca Pública De Villavicencio German Arciniegas, Villavicencio

=== Nariño ===
- Biblioteca Pública Municipal de Cumbal, Nariño

=== N. Santander ===
- Biblioteca pública Julio Pérez Ferrero, Cúcuta (in Spanish)

=== Putumayo ===
- Biblioteca Pública Municipal Marco Fidel Suárez, Mocoa

=== Quindío ===
- University of Quindio library

=== Risaralda ===
- Biblioteca Jorge Roa Martínez, Pereira (in Spanish)

=== Santander ===
- Biblioteca Gabriel Turbay, Bucaramanga, est.1982

=== Sucre ===
- University of Sucre library

=== Tolima ===
- Biblioteca Pública Municipal Alfonso Palacio Rudas
- University of Tolima library

=== Valle del Cauca ===
- Biblioteca Departamental Jorge Garcés Borrero, Cali (in Spanish)
- Cali Community Public Library Network, Cali (in Spanish)
  - Biblioteca del Centenario, Cali (in Spanish)

=== Vaupés ===
- Biblioteca Pública Departamental José Eustasio Rivera, Mitú

== See also ==
- Colombian literature
- Library associations in Colombia
- List of archives in Colombia
- Mass media in Colombia
