= San Javier Municipality =

San Javier Municipality may refer to:

- San Javier Municipality, Beni, Bolivia
- San Javier Municipality, Sonora, Mexico
- San Javier Municipality, Jalisco, Mexico

== See also ==
- San Javier (disambiguation)
