= List of archives in Colombia =

This is list of archives in Colombia.

== Archives in Colombia ==
- National Archives of Colombia
- Fundación Patrimonio Fílmico Colombiano
- Archivo Central e Histórico de la Universidad Nacional de Colombia
- Archivo Histórico de la Universidad del Rosario
- Archivo de Bogotá
- Instituto Caro y Cuervo
- Universidad del Norte, Barranquilla, Biblioteca Karl C. Parrish, Colecciones Especiales

== See also ==
- List of archives
- List of libraries in Colombia
- List of museums in Colombia
- Culture of Colombia
- Portal de Archivos Españoles (federated search of archives in Spain)
