= Biblioteca de España (Medellín) =

Library park in the Santo Domingo Savio, Medellín, Colombia

Spain Library Park
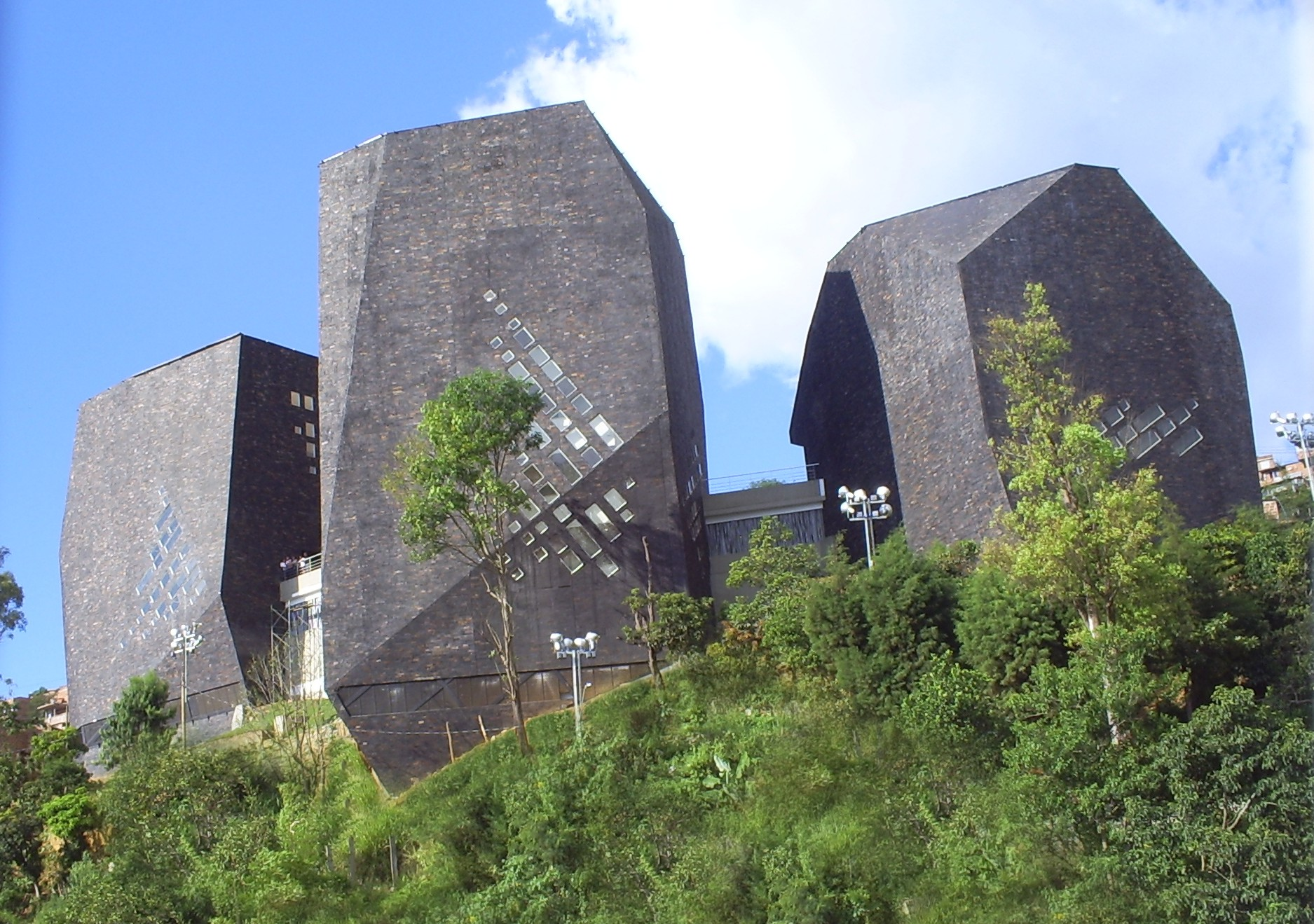
- 6°17′41″N 75°32′19″W
- Location: Santo Domingo Savio, Medellín, Antioquia, Colombia
- Type: Public library
- Established: 2007

Spain Library Park (Parque Biblioteca España) is a library park located in the Santo Domingo Savio neighborhood of Medellín, Colombia. It is named after the country of Spain, whose government helped fund the project through the Spanish Agency for International Development Cooperation.

The library is noted for its architecture. Its three buildings are meant to resemble black stones that are illuminated at night. In 2008, the library park won an award for best architecture of the year in the Ibero-American Architecture and Urban Design Biennial (IAUB) in Lisbon. The library was designed by Giancarlo Mazzanti, a Colombian architect who had previously designed another library park in the La Ladera neighborhood of Medellín.

Situated on a hillside above Medellin, the library can be reached by the Medellín Metrocable at the Santo Domingo stop on Line K.

== Design ==
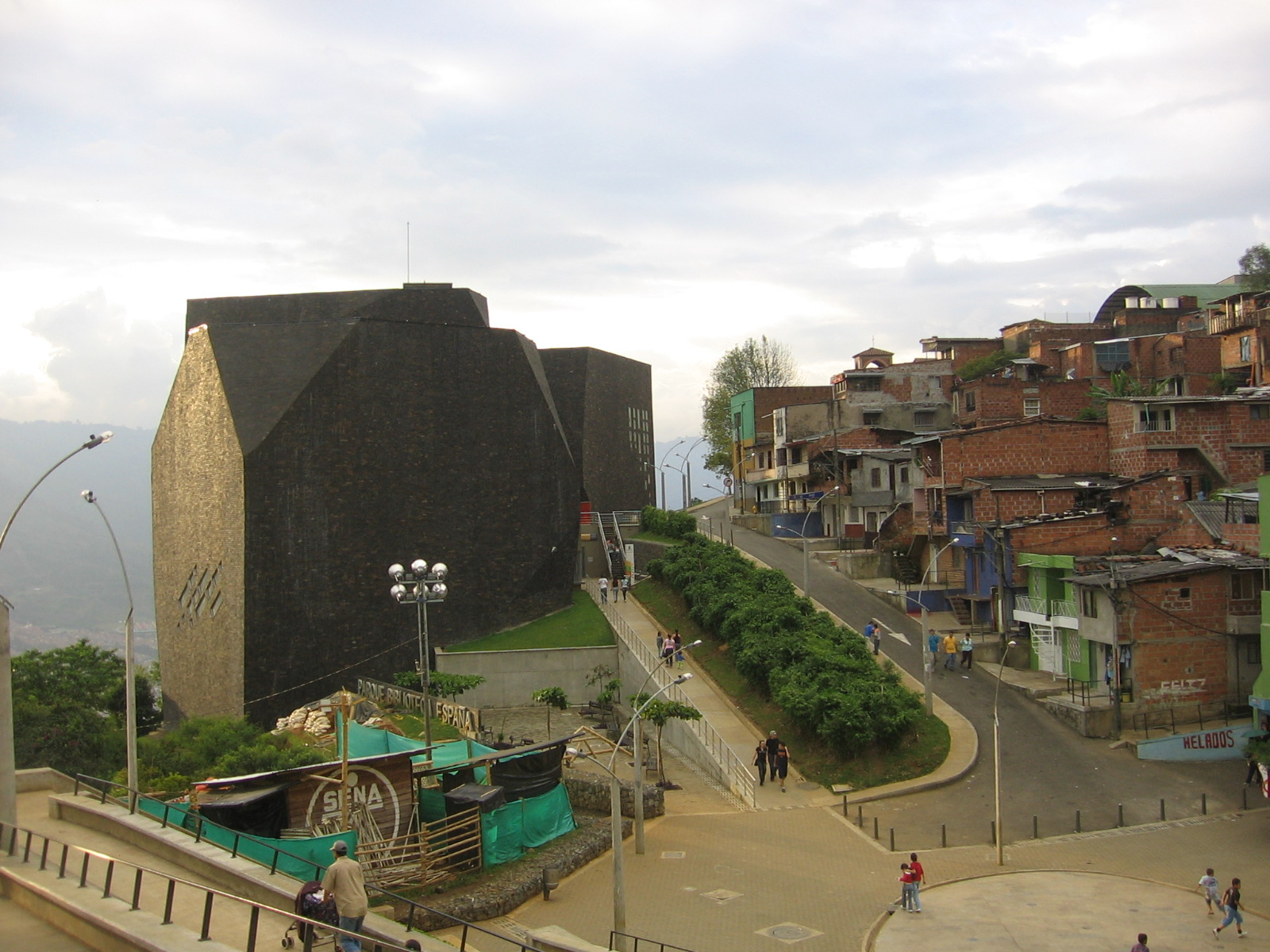
Spain Library, located in the 1st commune of Medellín.

The library was designed by Giancarlo Mazzanti, an architect from Barranquilla who also designed the León de Greiff Library in Colombia. It was completed in 2007 after the plans were approved in 2005. The construction area was 5,500 sqm with a final floor area of 3,727 sqm. The library construction cost approximately $4 million.

The library consists of three interconnected buildings decorated on the outside with dark stone tiles. The three buildings each house different programs: the library, the training rooms, and the auditorium, which was donated by the Spanish government. The three buildings are connected by a platform. New footpaths and roads were also built nearby to connect the library to the neighborhood.

The library was intentionally created with small windows, so that visitors could disconnect from the surrounding conditions of the neighborhood.

== History ==
At the end of the 20th century, the northwest barrio of Santo Domingo, located in the 1st commune, was considered one of the most dangerous places in Latin America. As late as 2003, the people were not allowed to stay on the streets after 5 p.m. and the area was controlled at night by urban militias.

The Northeast Integral Urban Project (Spanish: Proyecto Urbano Integral (PUI) Nororiental) was a city initiative to improve infrastructure in the poorest two zones in the north-west. A scheme for five Library parks was planned, the fourth one built and the most famous of which today is the Spain Library. The other libraries added as part of the city's education development program and redevelopment efforts included the León de Greiff Library, San Javier Library, Belén Library, and La Quintana Library. After the initial 2009 program another five libraries were added to the plan for 2011, for a total of ten library parks.

The library was inaugurated on 24 March 2007 with a visit from the King and Queen of Spain, Juan Carlos I of Spain and Queen Sofía of Spain.

In 2013, the city government hired the National University of Colombia to conduct a study of the problems of the facade. In 2014, the study by the university was completed. The results said that damage corresponded to failures in the facade but not in structural core. This repair will cost around 11,000 million pesos.

== See also ==
- List of libraries in Colombia
