= San Javier River =

San Javier River may refer to one of two rivers in Argentina:

- San Javier River (Santa Fe), an arm of the Paraná River
- San Javier River (Tucumán)
