= Olegario Rivera Public Library =

- Biblioteca Departamental Olegario Rivera
- 4°36′34.39″N 74°4′7.14″W
- Location: Colombia
- Type: Public
- Established: May 19, 1945
- Architect: Andrés Orrantia Herrera
- Service area: 1.970 m²

Collection
- Size: 30,000 items (Huila Public Library Network).

Other information
- Director: Miguel Darío Polanía Rodríguez

The Olegario River Departmental Public Library (Spanish: Biblioteca Departamental Olegario Rivera) is the coordinating library of the public library network of Huila, attached to the Departmental Secretariat of Culture and Tourism of Huila. As a heritage library, it has received the legal deposit of the region since 2010 in compliance with Law 1379, known as the Law of Public Libraries. It is located in the José Eustasio Rivera Cultural and Convention Center in the city of Neiva.

== History ==
It was created by Ordinance of the Departmental Assembly on May 19, 1945 and its first director was the Jesuit historian Jenaro Díaz Jordán. Since then, the Olegario Rivera Departmental Library has led important cultural processes for the city and the region. With a futuristic vision for its time, more than a library, it was conceived as a first-rate cultural center; local, departmental and national, being a model for other public libraries in the region.

It was located in the Santa Librada National School, the first floor of the Government House until its current headquarters, which was inaugurated in 2000., with the name of who was its first benefactor, Olegario Rivera, a character who helped the community of teachers and students of Huila in the tasks of consultation and research.

== Goals ==
The library was created as a place of inclusion, to provide a meeting point for citizens that allows equal conditions and opportunities to access information and cultural events. Based on this philosophy, its fundamental objectives are:

- Coordinate the Huila Public Library Network, made up of 41 public libraries.
- Increase and guarantee the possibilities for free access to information, with a varied range of literary, documentary and computer resources.
- Facilitate the educational and cultural mechanism of the Huila population.
- Continue with its status as a heritage library granted by Law 44 of 1993 to gather all the bibliographical collection of Huila, which also includes having the Huila room of the Huila Academy of History.
- It is responsible for receiving the Legal Deposit, according to Law 1379 of 2010.

== Services ==
Located on the first floor of the José Eustasio Rivera Cultural and Convention Center in the city of Neiva, a modern building characterized by natural lighting and spacious spaces that encourage reading and reflection. It has five areas; the children's room, general room, computer room, video library room and the José Eustasio Rivera room. In this sector, which features works by painters Luis Ángel Rengifo and Sergio Trujillo Magnenat, one can find a collection of special and unusual editions by the writer, which have been published in Colombia and abroad. Of singular importance to the local identity, the library has Tierra de Promisión by José Eustasio Rivera, the first book that identifies the Huila people.

It has about 30,000 books and serves an area of 1,970 square meters. It receives more than 150 users daily and has the capacity to receive 250 people simultaneously.

In addition to the research area and other activities typical of libraries, various cultural activities are held, such as strengthening the region's folkloric traditions, art exhibitions, poetry recitals, library meetings, writers, dance and music. Short story and poetry contests are constantly organized, among others. Its coordinator is the painter and writer Miguel Darío Polanía Rodríguez.

=== Activities ===
- In 2022, the exhibition "Cultural Identity" was held, with the participation of twenty countries. The artists highlighted were: Carla Espinosa from Uruguay, Yeison Novoa from Colombia, Hada Zurita Barona from Ecuador, and Claudia Anabel Cosme Ortega from Cuba with an honorable mention and as special guests; Sandra Moretti Nuñez, Jessica Pacheco, Carmen Flores Quispe, Jorge Oyola Sheen, and Rubi Sumae Berrocal painters from Peru.
- It has hosted the Meeting of Public Libraries.

== See also ==
- List of libraries in Colombia
