= Bethlehem Library =

Library park in Medellín, Colombia

Bethlehem Library Park
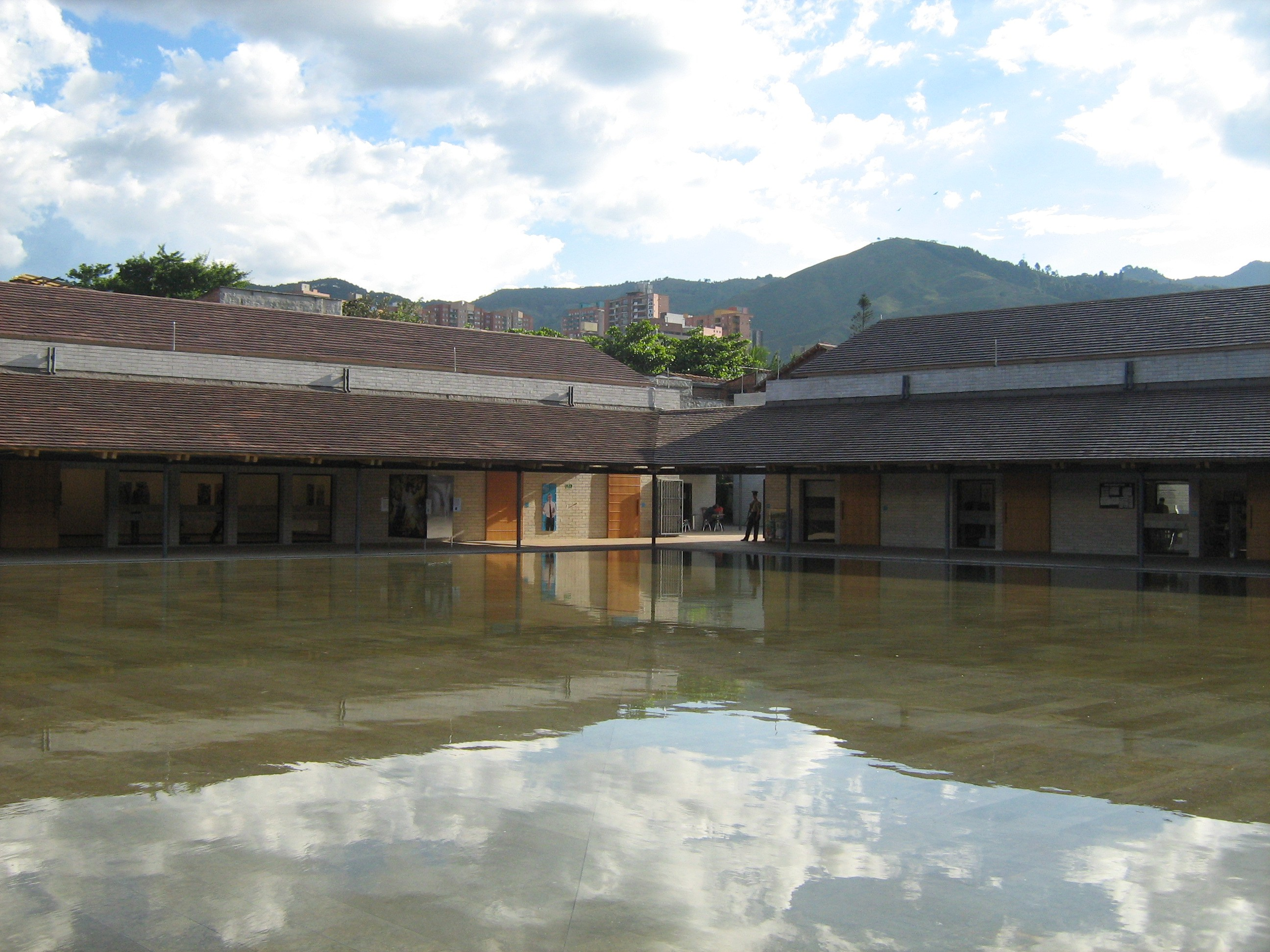
- Exterior view of library
- Location: Belén, Medellín, Colombia
- Type: Public library
- Established: March 15, 2008

Other information
- Website: https://bibliotecasmedellin.gov.co/parque-biblioteca-belen/

Bethlehem Library (Spanish: Parque Biblioteca Belén) is one of ten library parks in Medellín, Colombia, located in Comuna 16. The library was designed by Japanese architect Hiroshi Naito in collaboration with the University of Tokyo. It is named after its location in the Belén (Bethlehem) commune of Medellín.

The library park has public spaces with three different ambiances: a green plaza, a water plaza, and a plaza for the public.

== History ==
Universities in Colombia began a program of sharing with the University of Tokyo in 2006. As part of this exchange, a group of architects from the University of Tokyo, under the direction of Hiroshi Naito, donated the design of Bethlehem Library.

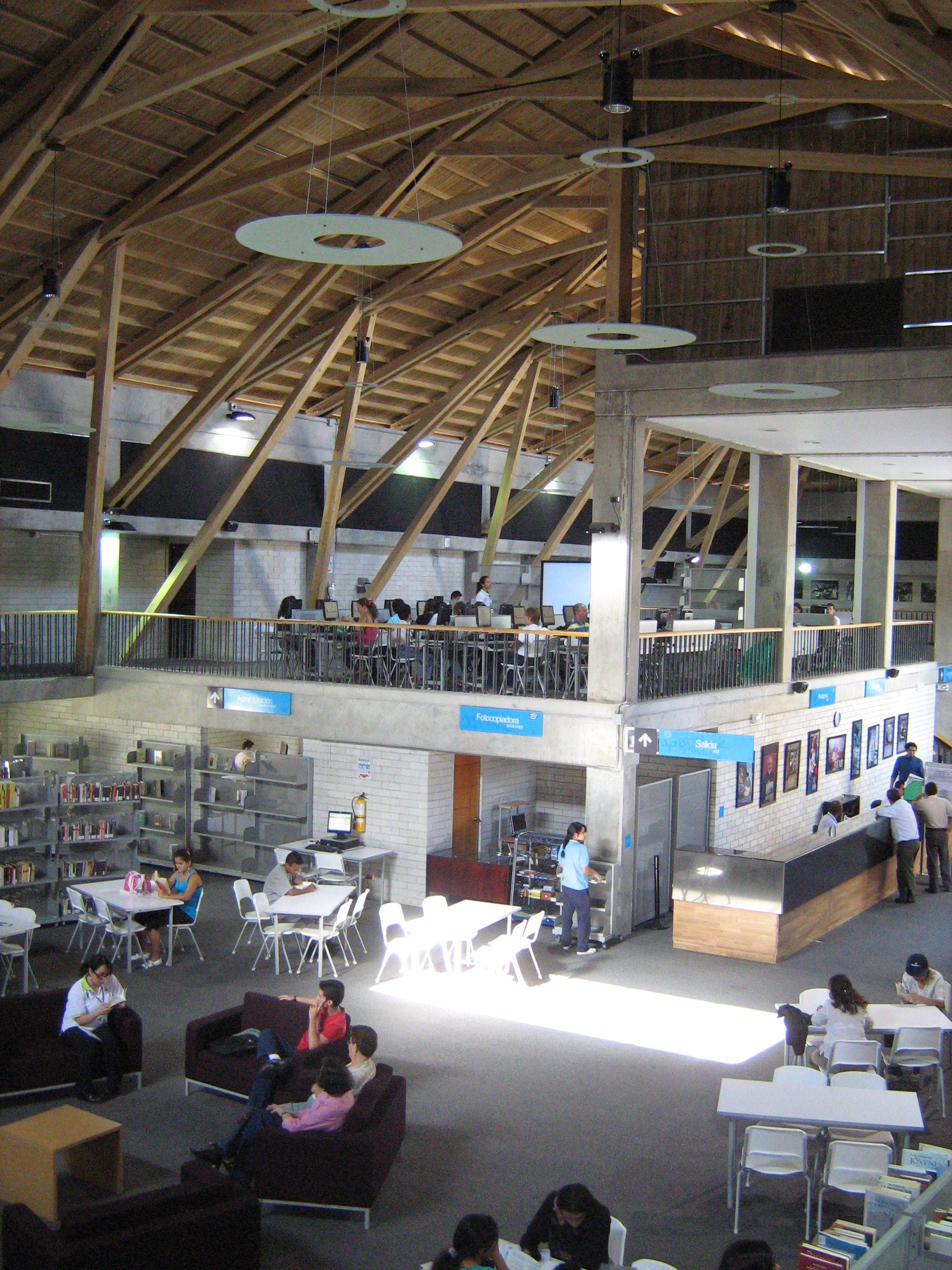
Interior view of Bethlehem Library Park.

== See also ==
- List of libraries in Colombia
