= Tomás Carrasquilla =

Colombian writer (1858–1940)

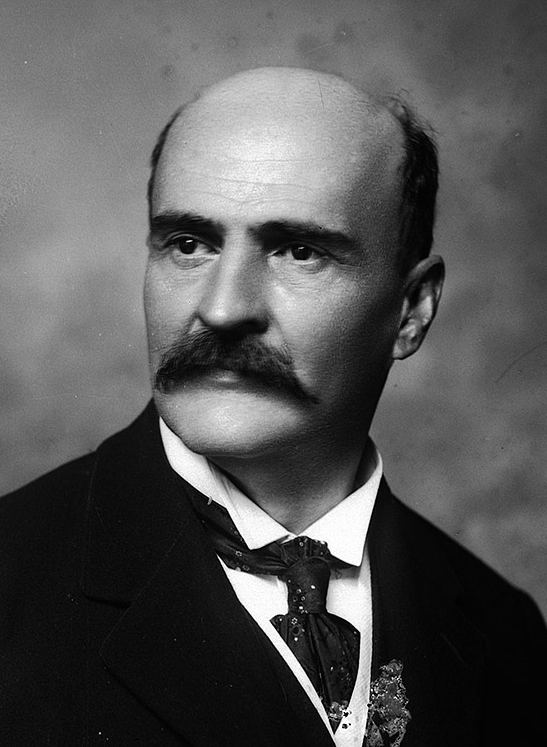
- Born: 17 January 1858; Santo Domingo, Antioquia, Granadine Confederation
- Died: 19 December 1940 (aged 82); Medellín, Antioquia, Colombia
- Education: University of Antioquia Medellín - Colombia
- Occupations: novelist, storyteller and essayist
- Writing career
- Language: Spanish
- Notable works: Simón El Mago (1890); La Marquesa de Yolombó (1926)
- Notable awards: Colombian Academy of Language – Jose María Vergara y Vergara National Prize of Literature and Science; 1936 La Marqueza de Yolombó; Cross of Boyacá
- Movement: Out of category due to his particular style. Some link him to Costumbrismo

Tomás Carrasquilla Naranjo (1858 – 1940) was a Colombian writer who lived in the Antioquia region. He dedicated himself to very simple jobs: tailor, secretary of a judge, storekeeper in a mine, and worker at the Ministry of Public Works. He was an avid reader, and one of the most original Colombian literary writers, greatly influencing the younger generation of his time and later generations. Carrasquilla was little known in his time, according to Federico de Onís, a scholar of Carrasquilla's works. It was only after 1936, when he was already 78 years old, when he was awarded with the National Prize of Literature, that Carrasquilla got a national recognition. Tomás Carrasquilla Library Park is named in his honor.

The Colombian civil wars of the second part of the 19th century prevented young Carrasquilla from continuing his studies at the University of Antioquia. A committed intellectual, Carrasquilla organized tertulias—social gatherings to read books and discuss them—in his Medellín house. Many young writers and intellectuals of his time joined those tertulias; from that time he was called "Maestro Tomás Carrasquilla." Among Carrasquilla's admirers was Colombian philosopher Fernando González Ochoa.

De Onís argues that Carrasquilla's work passed unknown in Colombia and abroad at the time because he lived during two different periods of Latin American literature: Costumbrismo and Romanticism, that had representatives like José Asunción Silva in Colombia, and the coming of Modernism as a reaction against Costumbrismo. As many classify the work of Carrasquilla as Costumbrist, so De Onís classifies him.

== Context ==
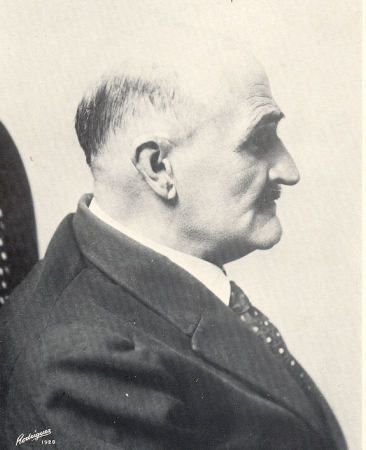
Don Tomás Carrasquilla in 1929, a picture by Melitón Rodríguez.

Carrasquilla's life straddled two centuries, becoming a link between two epochs in Colombia's history. When he was born in 1858, the country was called the Republic of New Granada, newly independent of Spain. In his work La Marqueza de Yolombó, Carrasquilla described how the most simple people of the end of the 18th century saw the events that broke the Colombia's political dependence on Spain.

He was also a citizen of the once-called United States of Colombia (1863–1886), a time when the Paisa Region saw the colonization of the current coffee areas. He also saw the Colombian Industrial Revolution at the beginning of the 20th century, the Thousand Days War, and many other changes in his country.

The Colombian civil wars of the 19th century were the reason why Carrasquilla could not finish his studies of law at the University of Antioquia.

One of those civil wars was reflected in his works Luterito and El Padre Casafús (in English, "The Reverend Casafús"). Those books were set in the context of the civil war of 1876, started by the Conservative partisans of Antioquia, Cauca and Tolima against the Liberal government of president Aquileo Parra, who intended to secularize the education. The story develops in the town of Cañasgordas, where a group of fighters prepare themselves to "defend the Faith." In this case, Carrasquilla's work is an approach to the deepest feelings of people during historical events.

== Life ==
=== Early years ===
Carrasquilla was born in Santo Domingo, an Andean town north-east of Medellín, on the Antioquean Mountain. He was the son of Isaza Carrasquilla and Ecilda Naranjo Moreno. His family owned some gold mines, and this allowed him to live well enough and dedicate himself to writing. One of his friends, also born in Santo Domingo, was the writer Francisco de Paula Rendón.

At the age of 15, he moved to Medellín to finish his secondary education at the University of Antioquia; he continued his study of law there. He had to abandon his law studies in 1877 because of the start of the civil war.

He returned to Santo Domingo, where he worked as a tailor and did some jobs in the municipality. Carlos Eugenio Restrepo invited him to the Café Literario ("literary café"), where he had to write a story in order to be admitted. He wrote Simón el Mago ("Simon the Mage"), one of his most popular stories. Simón was published in 1890, and brought to the cinema by Colombian director Víctor Gaviria in 1993.

=== Writer ===
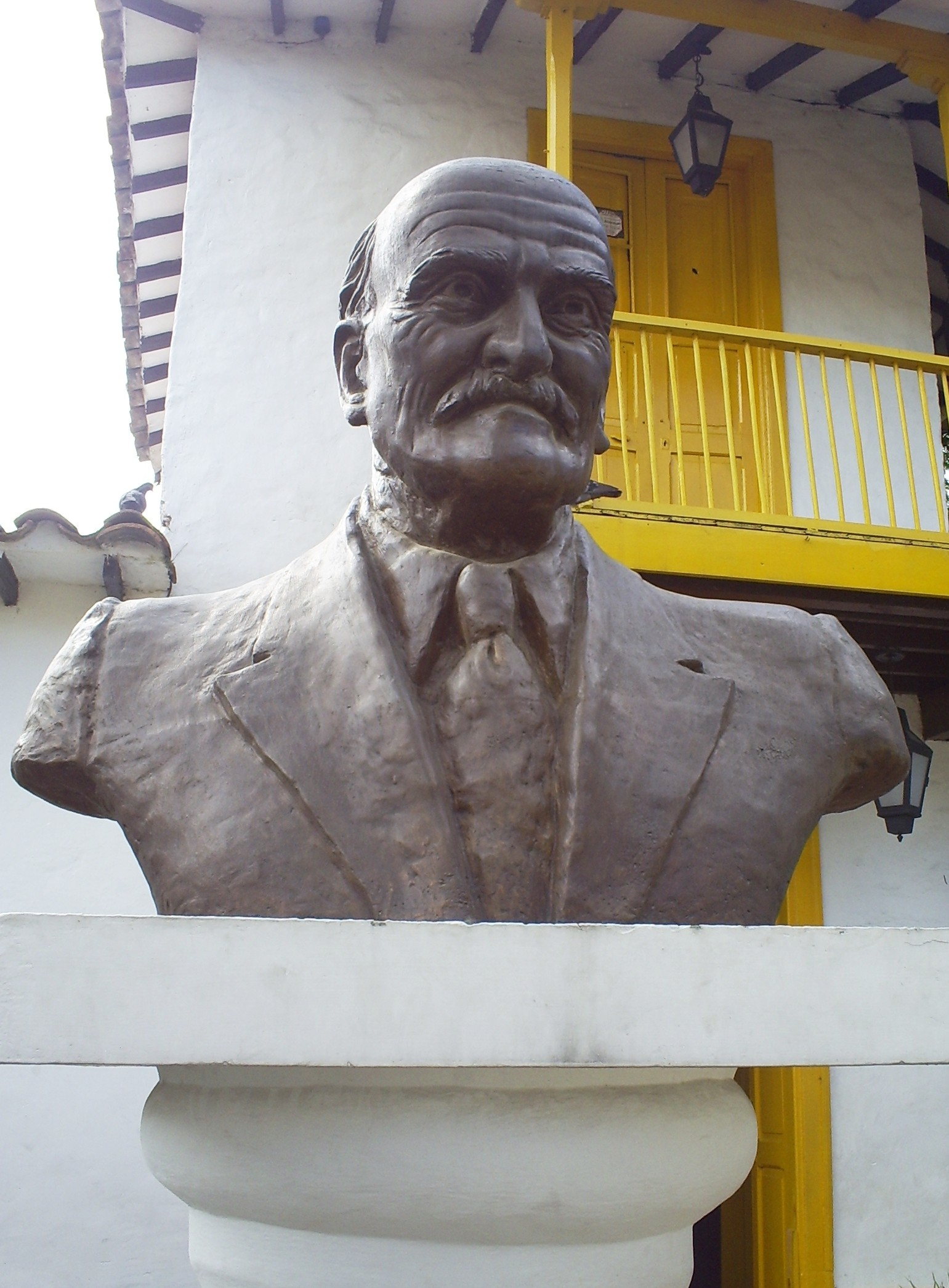
Bust of Tomás Carrasquilla in the Little Paisa Town Park in Medellín.

In 1896, Carrasquilla traveled to Bogotá for the publication of his first novel, Frutos de Mi Tierra ("Fruits of my Land"), written to demonstrate that any subject can be the matter of a story, which was very well received by critics. On that trip, he came to know José Asunción Silva, to whom he would some years later dedicate the essay "For the Poet."

He returned to Antioquia and had an accident, falling from a horse, which made him stay in Medellín for a time. When he returned to Santo Domingo, he dedicated himself to writing, until 1904, when he lost his fortune due to the Banco Popular bankruptcy. He then gained work as a storekeeper in a Sonsón gold mine until 1909.

After Carrasquilla returned to Medellín, he had a lively social and cultural life, associating with young intellectuals like Fernando González Ochoa, who became one of his best friends for the rest of his life. González was one of Carrasquilla's biggest admirers. Carrasquilla also knew of the cartoonist Ricardo Rendón, and the skeptic group Los Panidas (whom he supported, but never joined).

In 1914, Carrasquilla did some work for Colombia's oldest newspaper, El Espectador, when that publication was edited in Medellín. But soon thereafter, he moved to Bogotá, where he worked for the Ministry of Public Works until 1919.

Returning to Medellín, he continued studying literature, and in 1928 published La Marqueza de Yolombó ("The Marchioness of Yolombó"), one of the best-known works of Colombian literature. (Note: La Marqueza de Yolombó was made into a television series in the 1980s.)

=== Final years ===
The writer stayed in Medellín when his health began to decay and he started to go blind. In 1934, surgery gave him back limited vision; his blindness was not an obstacle to his writing, however, as he began to dictate his works.

In 1935, Carrasquilla was decorated with the Cross of Boyacá, an award that gives the recipient the same privileges as the president or ex-president of Colombia.

He wrote Hace Tiempos ("Long Time Ago") by dictation between 1936 and 1937; that work won him the José María Vergara y Vergara National Prize of Literature and Science from the Colombian Academy of Language. This recognition gave him national fame, and attracted international critics, who admired his work and rescued his name from near-anonymity.

In December 1940, Tomás Carrasquilla died among a large group of friends and admirers, who called him "Don Tomás" or "Maestro Tomás Carrasquilla."

== Between Costumbrism and Modernism ==
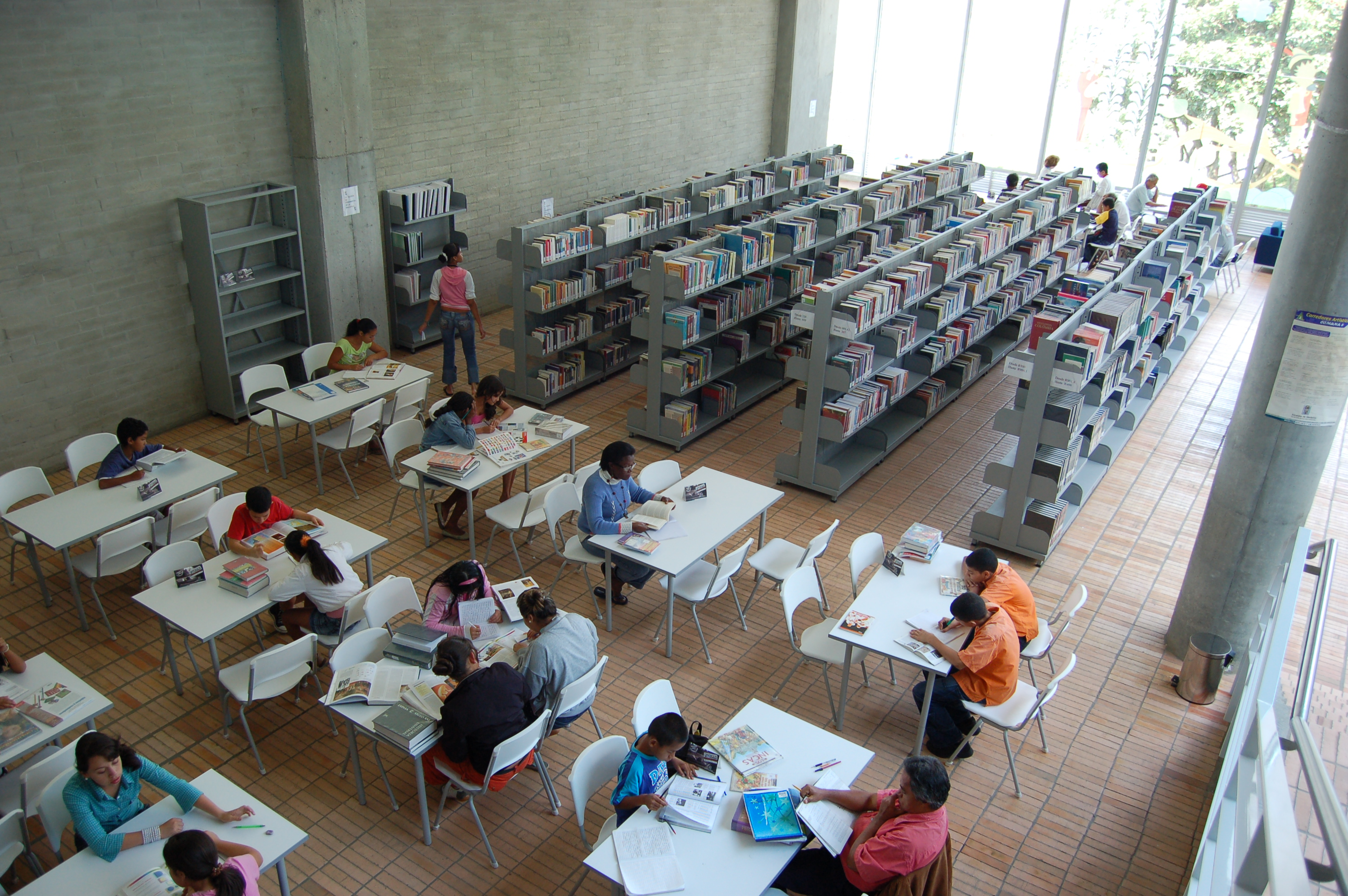
The Tomás Carrasquilla Library in Medellín.

Carrasquilla is usually seen as a Costumbrist author, due to the cultural context of his world. The traditional details of the simple folk and the descriptions of scenery in his work are characteristic of Costumbrismo, which was developed in Spain and Latin America during the 19th century. The objective of the Costumbrist author is the description of the frame of the traditions of a people without any further comment to the respect and as a consequence of Romanticism.

At the end of the 19th century, Modernism started to appear in Latin America and Spain. In Colombia, Modernism had authors, journalists, artists, and photographers like González, Greiff, Rendón, and Matiz. Modernism developed as a counter against Costumbrismo. According to Federico de Onís, Carrasquilla knew, and even shared, the new tendencies of Modernism; for example, he gave support to Los Panidas, but kept his own style and originality.

Strictly speaking, he was always an independent writer, and his biggest merit and originality manifest themselves in his ability to remain free from direct imitation of any influence, although all those he received are latent in his work.

— Frederico de Onís, Prologue, Cuentos de Tomás Carrasquilla

In this sense, the classification of Carrasquilla as a Costumbrista is not exact. According to De Onís, Carrasquilla's work departs from the static Costumbrismo of the 19th century, that described through description of detail :

His literary work is equal and diverse; diverse, unlike the work of Costumbrists of the 19th century that described their paintings, scenery and characters using the same pattern; equal, in that his work always permeates the substance of Antioquía, and this unique external reality is always seen through his personality.

— Frederico de Onís, Prologue, Cuentos de Tomás Carrasquilla

For Colombian journalist Carlos Uribe de los Ríos, Carrasquilla's classification as a Costumbrist author caused him a long marginalization within Colombian literature:

Carrasquilla was looked down by some Bogotanean writers of his time, who considered him as a provincial. And as the master of Santo Domingo thought the same of his rivals, it was not easy in such context to generate good feelings about the work of the Antioquean author that brought his work to its fair merit farther from the limits of his province. Hadn't the Canadian professor Kurt Levy wrote a critic biography of him, far fewer people would today remember the Colombian writer and his most notorious novels according with his critics: La Marquesa de Yolombó, Frutos de mi tierra and a great part of his short stories. Don Tomás Carrasquilla was a writer able to harvest simple and straightforward anecdotes from everyday life, and to transform them in perplexing, intense and beautiful stories. He was a master of detail, of description in filigree, of the appropriated word, with the advantage of knowing how to maintain the constant interest of the reader. Ironic, sometimes merciless, tender when it was fit and owner of that indispensable intensity to transform an ordinary story into a minded and thrilling narrative.

— Carlos Uribe de los Ríos, Desempolvando a Carrasquilla, EquinoXio

== Fernando González ==
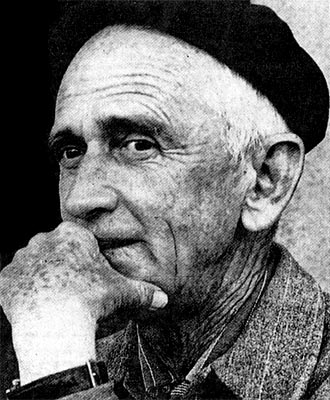
González, el filósofo de Otraparte, was a great admirer and friend of Carrasquilla. They had a regular correspondence and comments of their works.

If there is one thing that proves that Carrasquilla was more than a Costumbrist, and that he used elements of realistic modernism in his work, it is his intellectual relationship and great friendship with the Fernando González Ochoa, the filósofo de Otraparte ("Philosopher from somewhere else"). 39 years apart in age, González knew Carrasquilla at the time he was founding Los Panidas with Rendón and De Greiff in Medellín .

González, another master of Colombian writing, said in one of his essays about the author in Hace Tiempos de Carrasquilla:

This Carrasquilla looks to much, listen to much, so much tailor of clothe and souls, so much realistic, so much and almost divine that feeds himself of the energies of his Antioquean country land. Although I am in my sterile forty, when I read him and when I listen to him, I get this conclusion: he is unique in Colombia; he is a Colombian proud, he is the one I can send to M. Bréal to see that we are equal to the Europeans (...)

— Fernando González, "Hace Tiempos" de Tomás Carrasquilla

== Works ==
Although Carrasquilla's works were only widely available in the Paisa Region during his life, it does not mean that he was completely ignored elsewhere in Colombia and abroad. Especially since 1936, with the recognition of the National Prize of Literature and Science, his work attracted the attention of foreign literary critics, like the Chileans Arturo Torres Rioseco and Mariano Latorre. He kept up a good friendship, by correspondence, with writers like José Martí and Miguel de Unamuno.

Carrasquilla's works are divided into novels, stories, essays, articles, and letters. In 1906, he confessed in a letter to a friend that he was writing because of his economic problems, being in bankruptcy, although all his life he enjoyed a well-off lifestyle and he never married. Some of the articles he wrote in El Espectador made some observers suggest that he was a journalist, but his contributions to that field were rather limited.

=== Novels ===
- (1896) Frutos de mi tierra
- (1897) En la diestra de Dios padre
- (1897) Dimitas Arias
- (1903) Salve, Regina
- (1906) Entrañas de niño
- (1910) Grandeza
- (1920) Ligia Cruz
- (1920) El Padre Casafus
- (1920) Superhombre
- (1925) El Zarco
- (1928) La Marquesa de Yolombó
- (1935–1936) Hace tiempos
- Ligia Cruz
- (1864–1866) Los malos hábitos
- El Rifle

=== Stories ===
- (1890) Simón El Mago
- (1890) Palonegro
- (1897) Blanca (short story)
- (1898) El ánima sola
- (1899) San Antoñito
- (1926) Rogelio

=== Collections ===
Carrasquilla's articles and stories that appeared in different publications from Medellín at the beginning of the 20th century were gathered in two collections:

- (1914) Homilías
- (1934) Dominicales

=== The Marquesa of Yolombó ===
La Marquesa de Yolombó (1928), a historical novel, is one of Carrasquilla's most popular novels. It describes the reconstruction of a Colombian town at the end of the 18th century, at the height of the movement for independence from Spain. The novel describes the social classes of the time, with the Spaniards and Spaniard Americans at the top, and the low social classes being blacks and mestizos. At the time, Yolombó was a strategic town among the gold mines of Antioquia.

=== Simón the Magician ===
Simón El Mago was a story written in 1890 in which Carrasquilla ridiculed witchcraft. It also shows the relation between whites and blacks in Colombia at the end of the 19th century, and the mixture of beliefs among the mestizaje. In the story, Toñito, the youngest child at home, is cared by his nana, Frutus, who used to talk to him about the art of witchcraft—something that made a great impression on the boy. The boy decided to have his own adventures using his nana's informal lessons, and wound up in terrible trouble that his father arranged with a strong punishment.
