= San Xavier =

San Xavier may refer to:

- Francis Xavier (1506–1552), Roman Catholic missionary
- San Javier, Ñuflo de Chávez, Santa Cruz Department, Bolivia
- San Xavier, Arizona, a town
- San Xavier Indian Reservation, near Tucson, Arizona, United States
  - Mission San Xavier del Bac, a historic Spanish Catholic mission on San Xavier Indian Reservation
- San Xavier talus snail or Sonorella eremita, a species of air-breathing land snail

== See also ==
- San Javier (disambiguation)
- St. Xavier (disambiguation)
