= Manguinhos Library Park =

Library and park complex in Rio de Janeiro, Brazil

Coordinates: 22.8864°S 43.2490°W

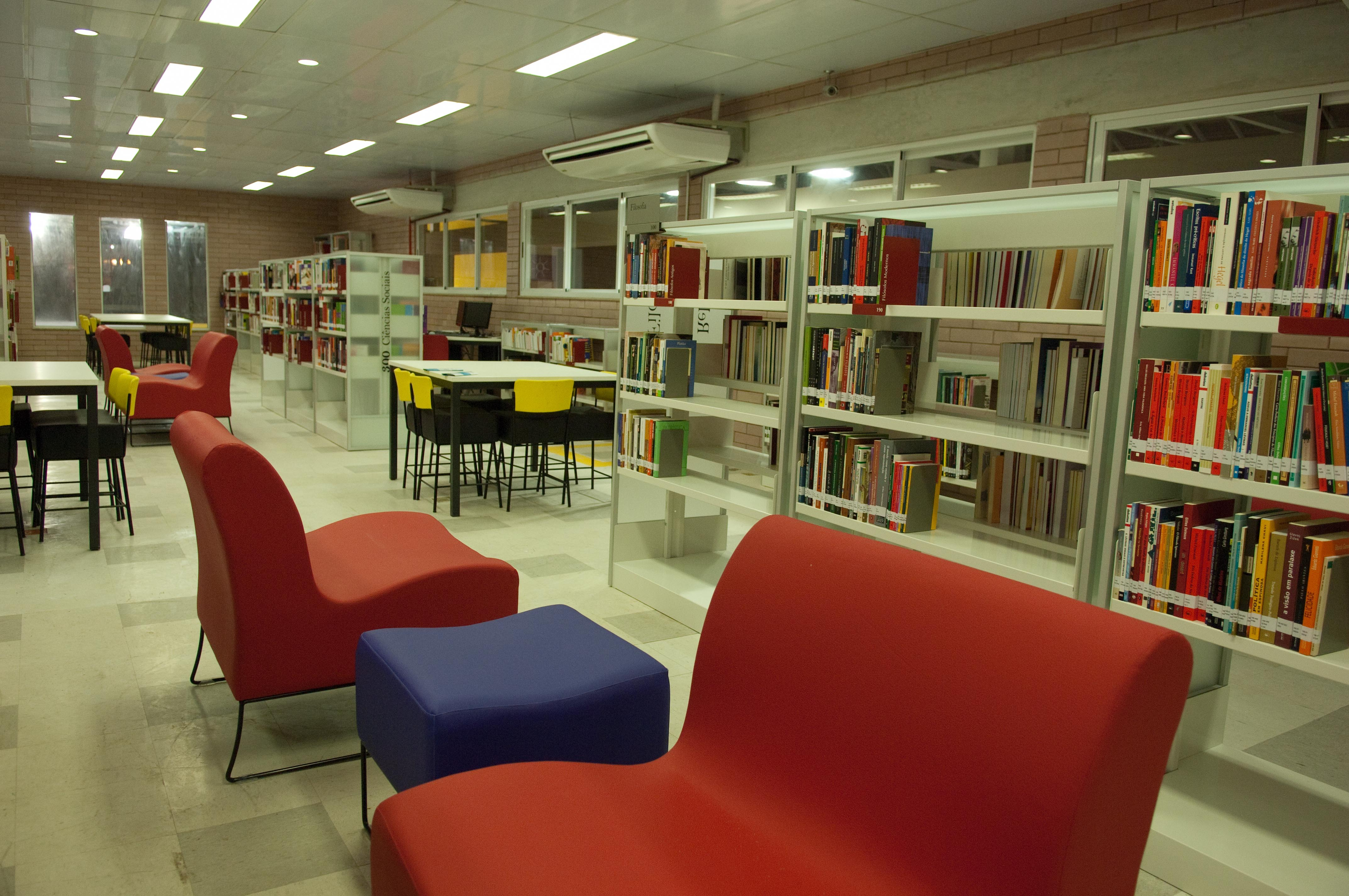
- Interior view of the library.
- Location: Benfica, Rio de Janeiro, Brazil
- Type: Public Library

Manguinhos Library Park (Portuguese: Biblioteca-Parque de Manguinhos) is a library and park complex in Rio de Janeiro, Brazil. The library opened on April 29, 2010. It contains over 25,000 books, 900 DVDs and 3 million songs, and also has a theatre that seats 200 people, a music room, classrooms, and a “Meu Bairro” ("My neighborhood") room created for community member meetings. It is located in Manguinhos, a favela in the neighborhood of Benfica. Benfica is in what is known as the "North Zone" of Rio de Janeiro.

The creation of a "library park" complex was inspired by the library parks of Colombia, which were created as cultural projects in the less affluent neighborhoods of Medellín to promote social inclusion.

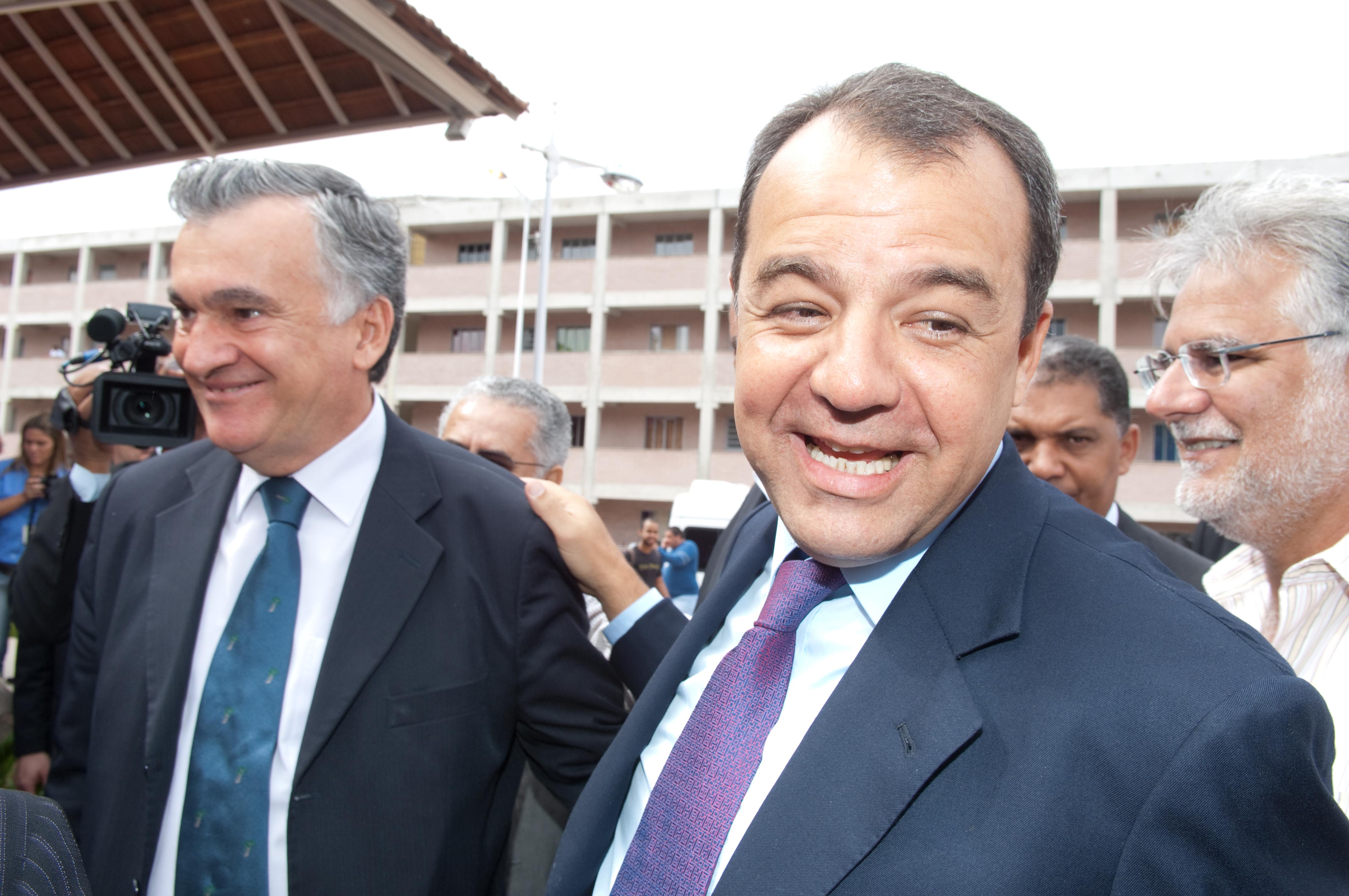
Brazil's Minister of Culture, Juca Ferreira (right) and the governor of Rio de Janeiro, Sérgio Cabral Filho (left) at the opening of Manguinhos

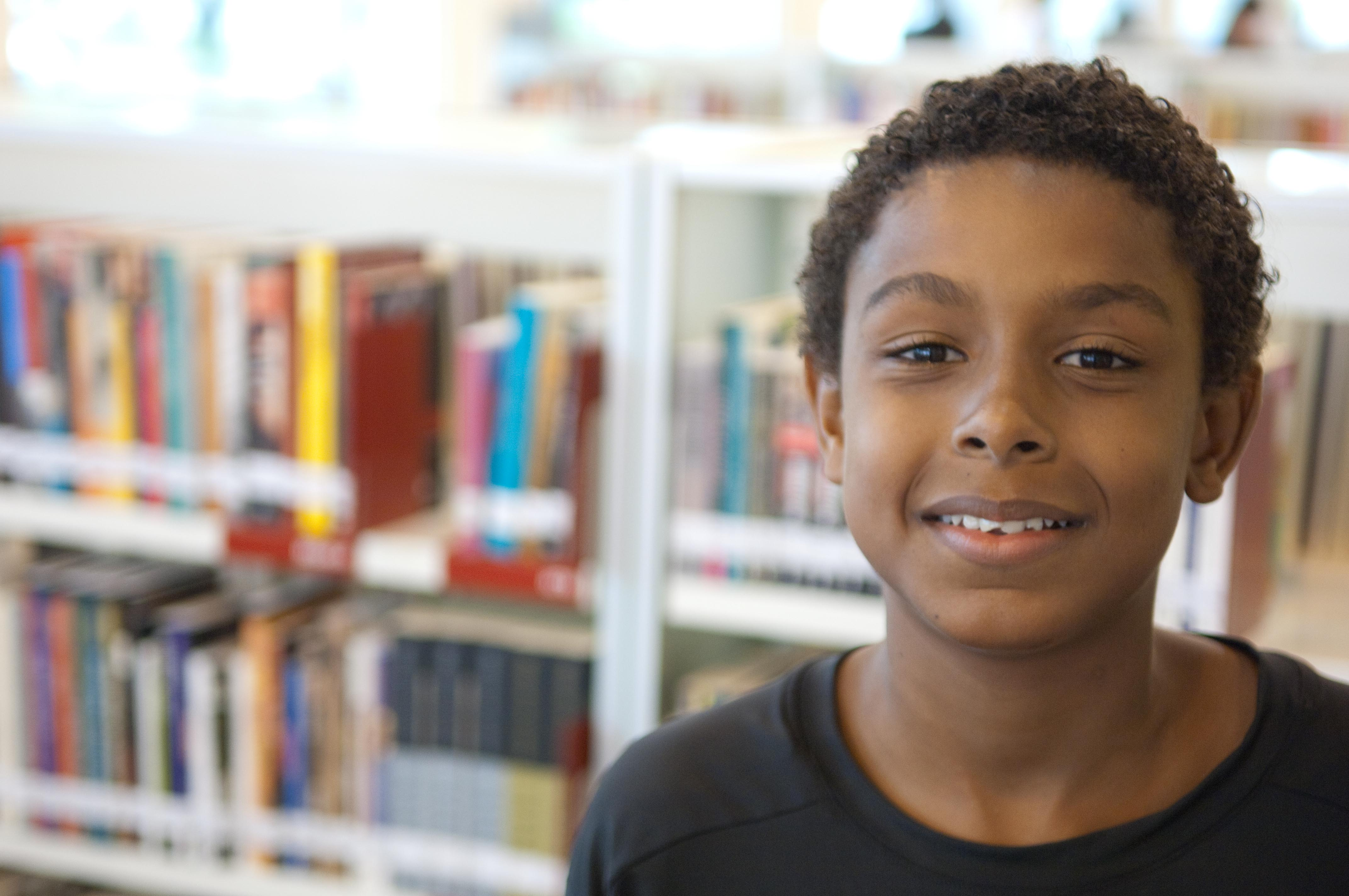
A boy at the inauguration of the library park

The library's design is meant to be inviting. Its exterior is painted dark-pink with white doors and windows.

The Minister of Culture, Juca Ferreira, and the governor of Rio de Janeiro, Sérgio Cabral Filho, attended the inauguration of the first library park.

== Description ==
The Library-Park Manguinhos occupies an area of 3300 m^{2} of a former Army Supply Depot. It serves 16 communities in the North Zone of Rio de Janeiro, with a population of approximately 100,000. The place was urbanized and transformed into the place with the highest concentration of social facilities in a poor community in the city. The cultural complex has library for books and film, a reading room for people with visual impairments, digital music collection, movie theater, cafeteria, and free internet access. The Ministry of Culture has invested £2.5 million to equip the Manguinhos Library-Park. The equipment had a total investment of $8.6 million, of which R$7.4 million from the Federal Government and R$1.2 million contribution from the state government.

== See also ==
- List of libraries in Brazil
