= San Franciscu Xavier-a, tuji kudd-i Goeam xara =

"San Franciscu Xavier-a, tuji kudd-i Goeam xara" ('Saint Francis Xavier, your body lay at the city of Goa') is Konkani hymn in tribute to Saint Francis Xavier by Raimundo Florianop Feliciano Barreto during the 19th century in Goa, India.

== History ==
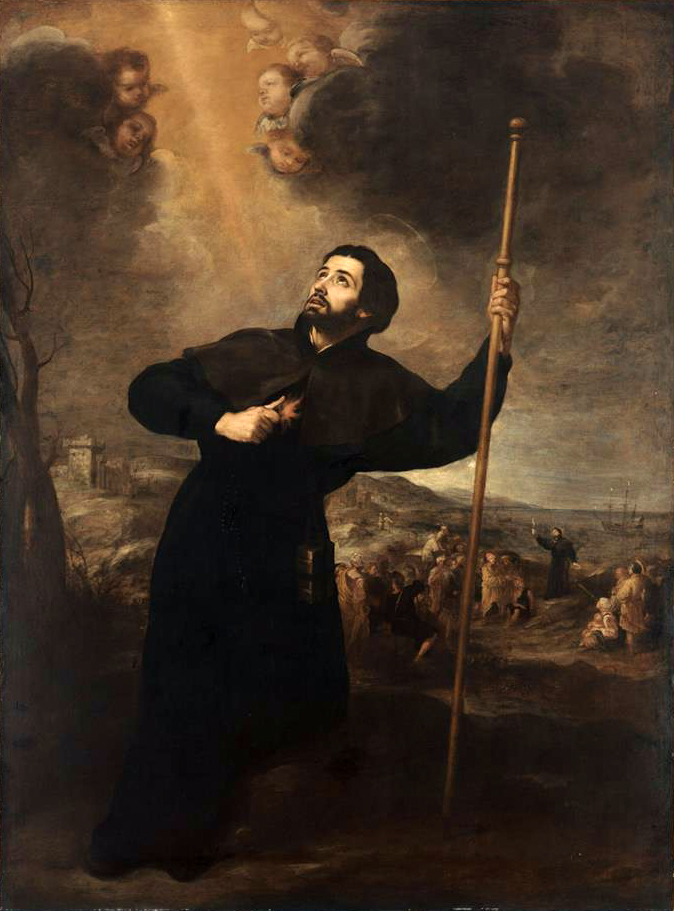
Painting of St. Francis Xavier (1506–1552) by Bartolomé Esteban Murillo, c. 1670

Raimundo Floriano Feliciano Barreto (16 February 1837 – 23 July 1906) was a gaunkar (landowner) of Loutolim, a village of Goa. He lived at St. Matias, Divar, Goa. Raimundo was the mestre da capela of the Se Cathedral, Goa. He scripted, set to music, and conducted the first public rendition of the "San Franciscu Xavier-a...". Besides conducting Goa's largest choir at the Se Cathedral, Mestre Raimundo, as an Economo, recovered land rents due to the cathedral from the villages of Piedade, Vanxim, etc. of Divar. He maintained accounts. He also collected monthly grants to the Canons of the Cathedral from the Treasury in Panjim and disbursed their salaries.

Travel from Divar and Old Goa to Panjim, those days, was by rowboat. Raimundo was returning by a rowboat one evening, with the money for the Canons' salaries drawn from the treasury in the bag to which he clutched tightly. The river waters were choppy and tossed more than usual. The boat had reached the Ribandar area, when it suddenly rolled, jettisoning everyone into the waters. A lady who saw that happen raised an alarm and villagers rushed to join the boatman in rescuing the drowning passengers. As Raimundo sunk to the riverbed, sure end within sight, he prayed to St. Francis Xavier (1506–1552), vowing that if saved, he'd pay with his best talents a tribute in the saint's honour. He was saved, but not the bag with the money for the Canons of the Cathedral. The cruel Canons would have none of his story. They demanded Raimundo to make good the loss, by recovering the moneybag from the riverbed or from his assets. Raimundo sold his ground-plus-one mansion at St. Matias, to a Silveira of the same locality, and paid the dues to the Canons.

Yet he owned another debt, that of redeeming the vow made to St. Francis Xavier as he drowned in the murky waters of the Mandovi that day. He worked on this silently. The result was kept a closely guarded secret by the composer-conductor and his choir, until the next December 3, at the feast Mass of the saint at the Basilica of Bom Jesus, where it was unveiled. The entire congregation, led by the Archbishop-Patriarch and clergy, were awestruck. Never had such a hymn—so Goan, so magical—been heard before. The hymn reverberates every December 3, to this day.

San Franciscu Xaviera
Tuji kuddi Goeam xara
Jezuchea sangata
Sodanch tuji niti vortouta

Fransisk soinik kullientlo
Navarra rajeant zolmolo
Parizak xikunk gelo
Thoisor inas taka bhettlo

Inasan thokos ghetlo
Krista-soinik toiar kelo
An Indiek taka dhaddlo
Thoisor dhach vorsam vavurlo

To sanchian zunvea melo
Tacho otmo sorgar gelo
Pun tachi kudd nam kusli
Ochoriamnim ti samball'li

Zori vilaitent melo
Mortoch Goeam portun ailo
Amche sovem tum ravcho
Samball korunk Goenkarancho

Sam Franciscu Xaviera
Tozo zolma des navarra
Tuji kuddi Goeam xara
Pun otmo voikunnt-nogra

Yaitt-vignam ietat tednam
Zhuzam–moddam uprastanam
Amkam tum visrum naka
Jezuchea bollvont soinika

Source: Hymn taken from Konkani Hymns on St. Francis Xavier article posted on "Goa.com".
