= Library Park (Belleville, Wisconsin) =

- U.S. National Register of Historic Places
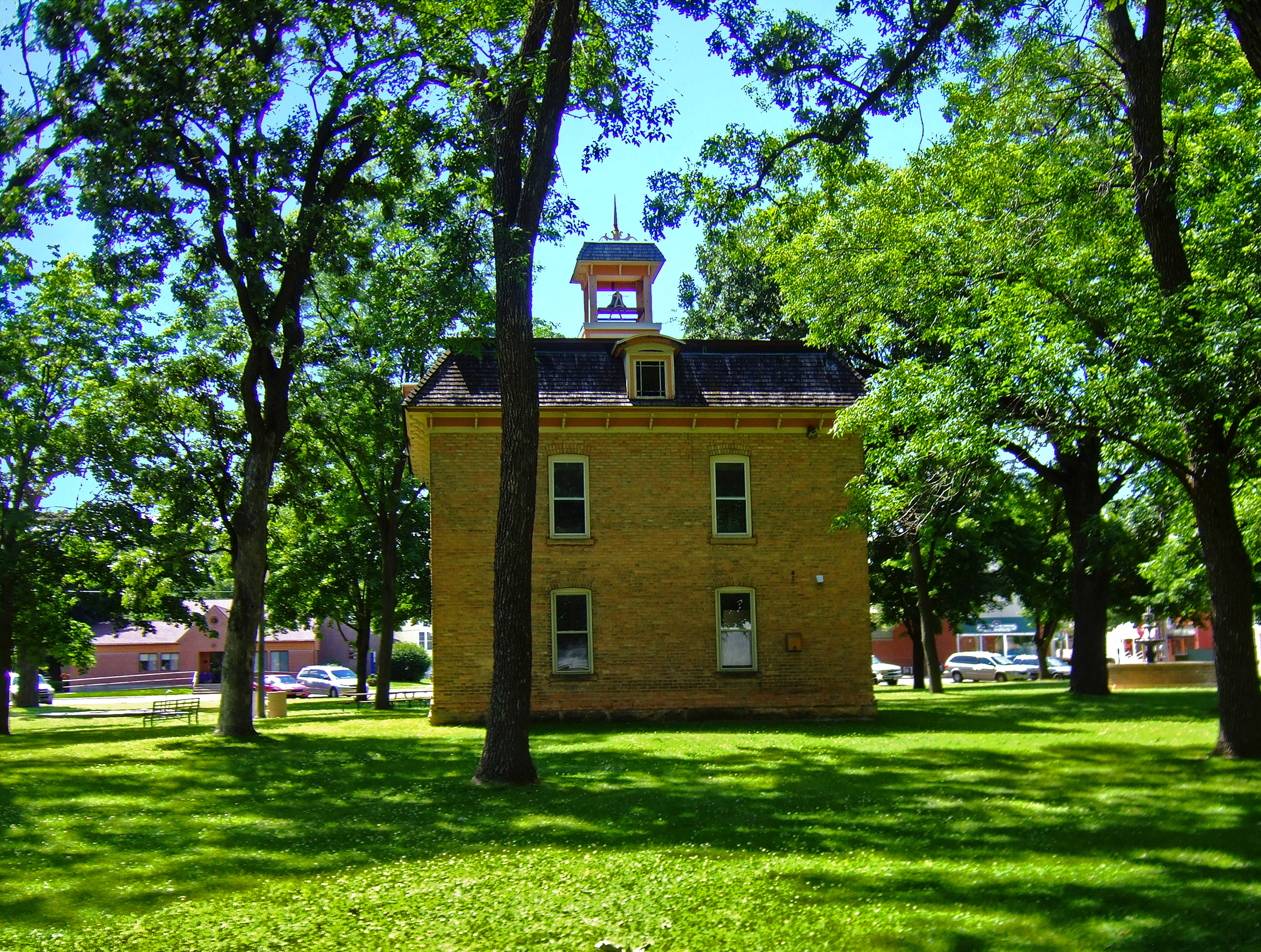
- The former village hall, located in the park
- Location: Bounded by Vine, Main, Park and Pearl Sts., Belleville, Wisconsin
- Coordinates: 42°51′33″N 89°32′00″W
- Area: 1.8 acres (0.73 ha)
- NRHP reference No.: 81000038
- Added to NRHP: January 26, 1981

Library Park is the village green in Belleville, Wisconsin, platted in 1851, to which the two-story cream brick village hall was added in 1894. The park was listed on the National Register of Historic Places in 1981 and on the State Register of Historic Places in 1989.

== History ==
The main building in the park is the former Belleville Village Hall, built in 1894. It was also used as a firehouse, jail and a public library. Aside from the Village Hall, the park itself has been important to the community, hosting high school commencements, picnics, band concerts, 4 July celebrations, and ice cream socials. In the 1930s and 1940s village merchants offered free movies in the park on Saturday evenings in summer. The School Fair was also held there, with cattle tied around waiting to be judged.

In 1960, the library was moved to a different location and in 1998, the Belleville Historical Society acquired the building. Also in the park is a historic pump house and a more-recently built gazebo, fountain and memorial plaque.
