= San Javier River (Tucumán) =

River in Argentina

Río San Javier (San Javier River) is a stream 8.9 kilometres (5.5 mi) from the summer town of San Javier in Tucumán Province, Argentina.
