= San Javier, Río Negro Province =

Coordinates: 40°46′S 63°18′W

San Javier
- Municipality and village
- Interactive map of San Javier
- Country: Argentina
- Province: Río Negro Province
- Time zone: UTC−3 (ART)
- Climate: BSk

San Javier is a village and municipality in Río Negro Province in Argentina.
