= San Javier Library =

Library park in Medellín, Colombia

Coordinates: 6.2552°N 75.6012°W

- Presbítero José Luis Arroyave Restrepo
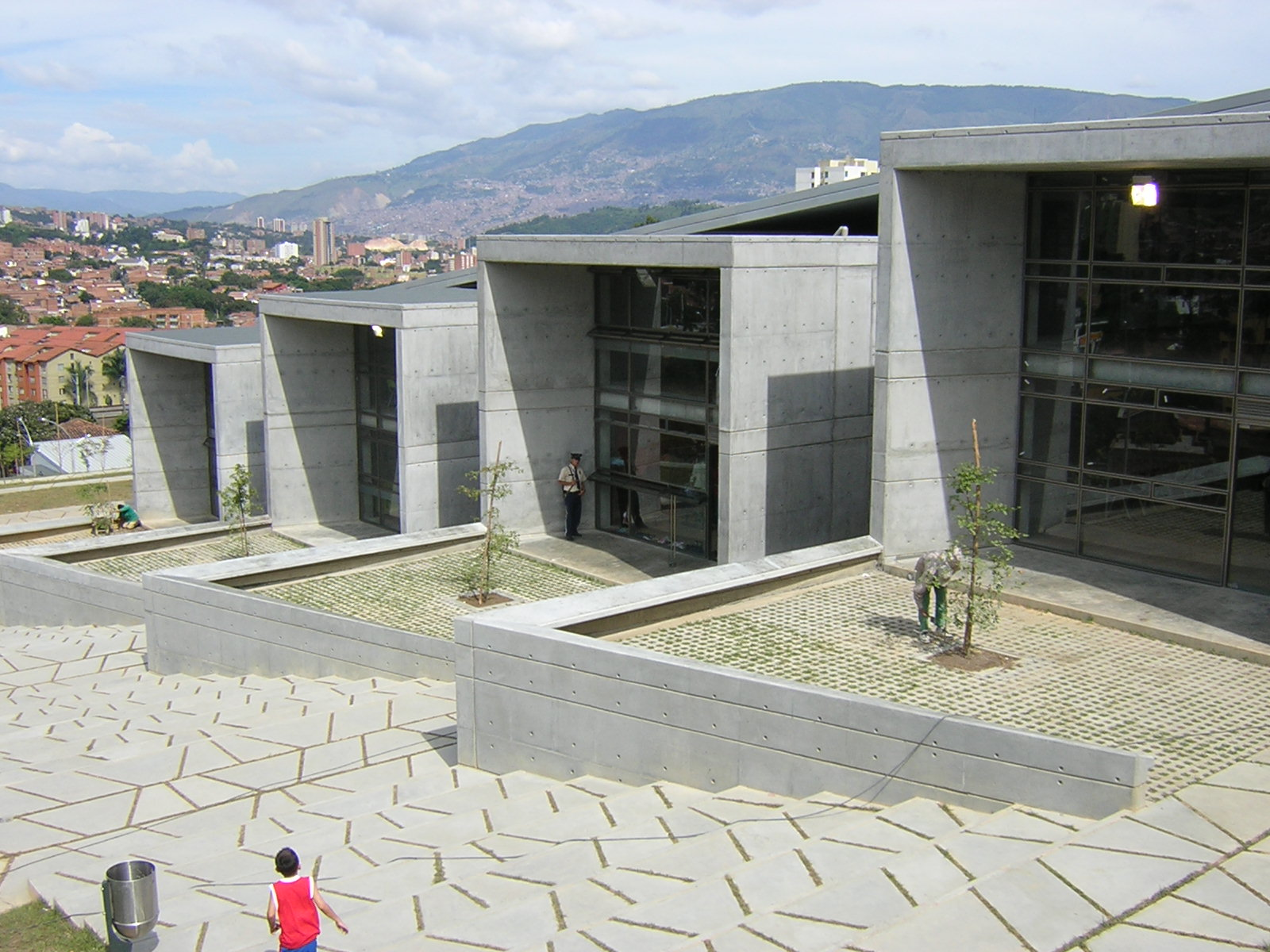
- Exterior view of library
- Location: San Javier, Medellín, Colombia
- Type: Public library
- Established: December 31, 2006

Father José Luis Arroyave Restrepo Library, most commonly known as San Javier Library (Spanish: Parque Biblioteca San Javier) for its location in the San Javier commune, is one of ten library parks in Medellín, Colombia. The library was designed by architect Javier Vera.

== History ==
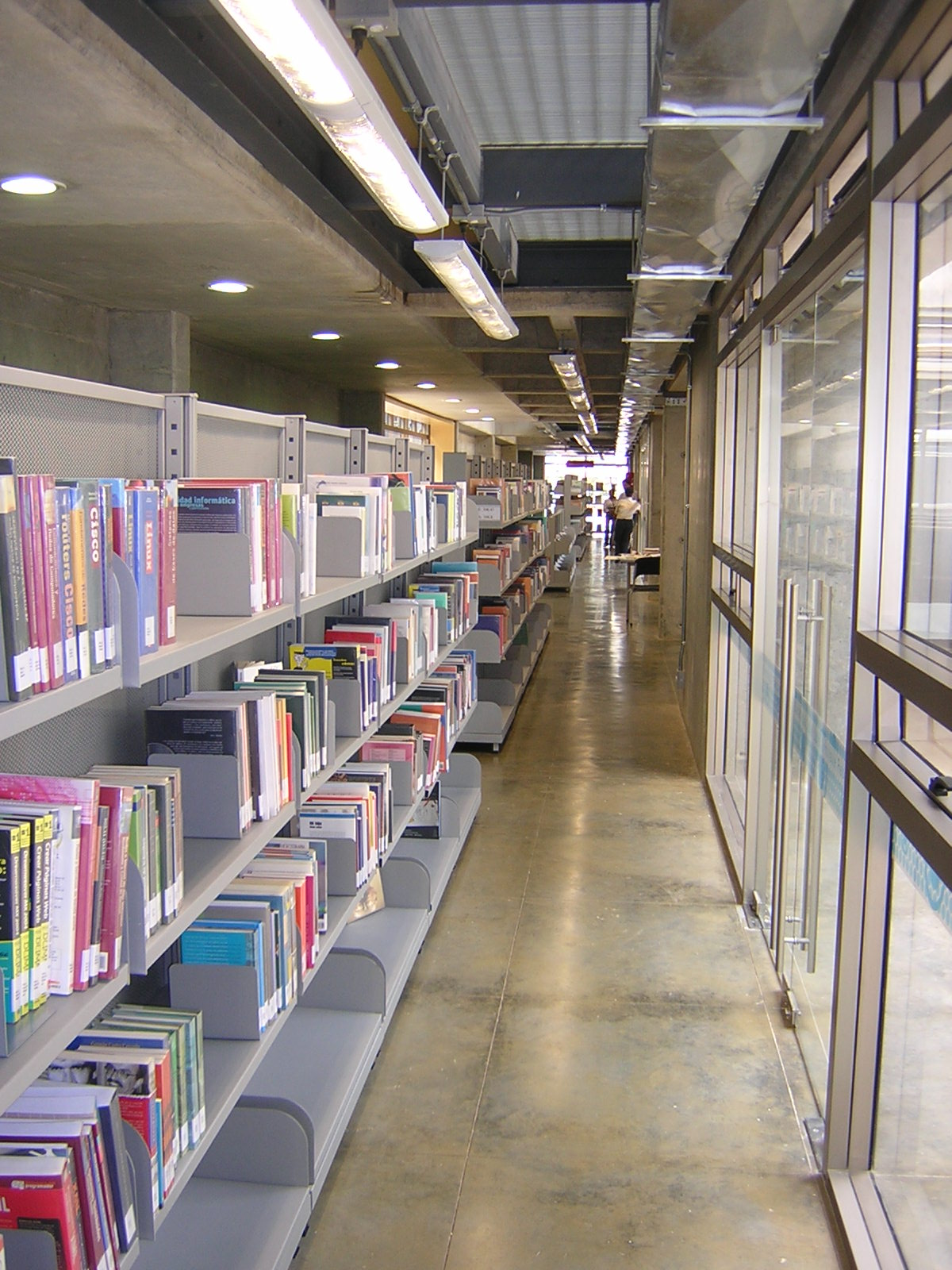
Interior of the library

A hillside area south of the San Javier metro station was chosen as the site of the San Javier Library Park. It is located at the beginning of the San Cristobal Metro Cable.

Construction began on June 1, 2005.

== See also ==
- List of libraries in Colombia
