= León de Greiff Library =

Library park in Medellín, Colombia

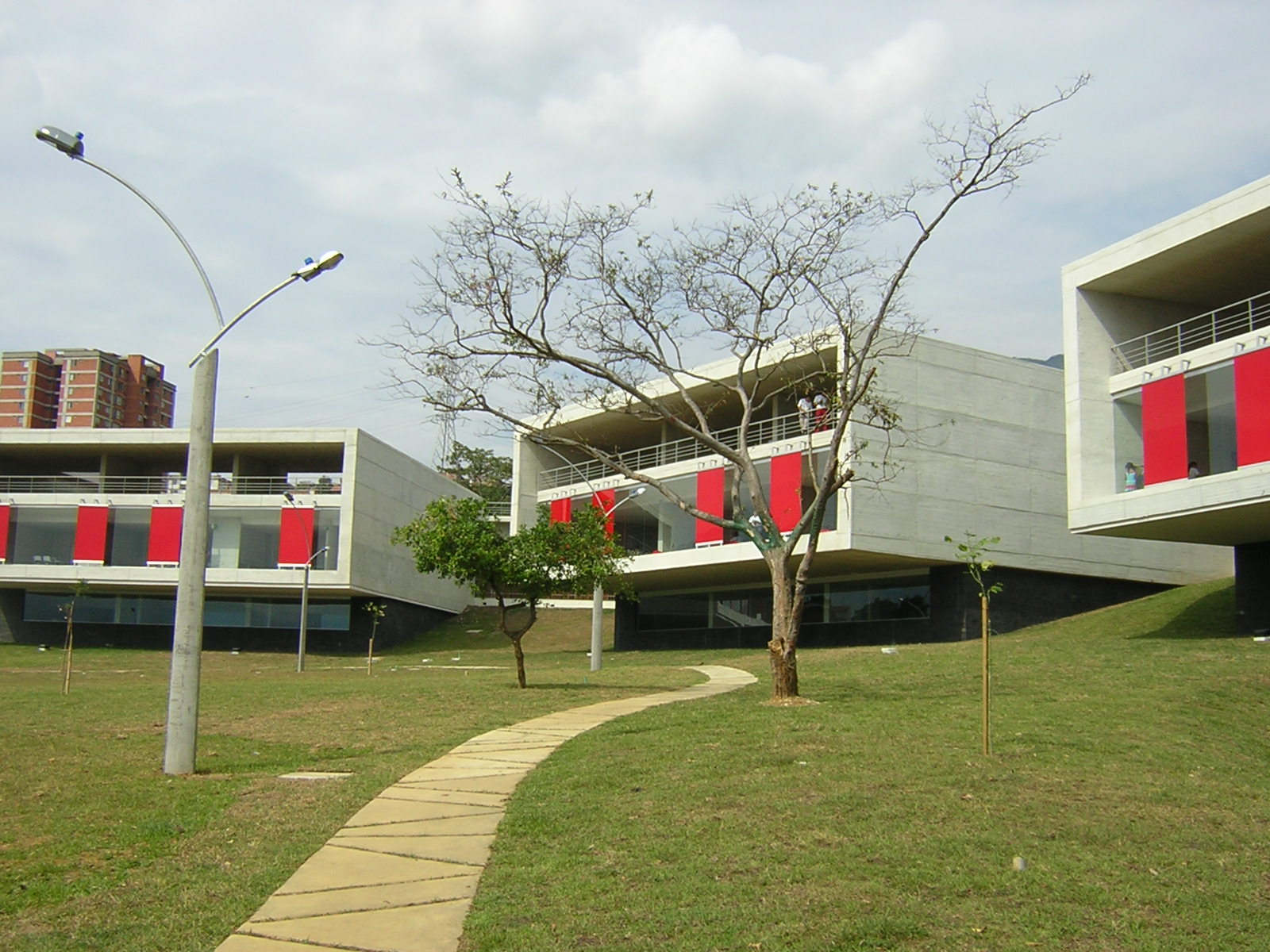
- 6.251202261426748°N 75.55323768926982°W
- Location: Medellín, Colombia
- Type: Public library
- Established: February 2007

León de Greiff Library, also known as La Ladera Parque Biblioteca (English: Hillside Library Park), is an architecturally renowned library park in Medellín, Colombia. It is named after the poet Leon de Greiff and designed by architect Giancarlo Mazzanti.

== History ==
León de Greiff Library stands on the site where a late 19th century monastery was transformed into La Ladera prison, which at one point housed over one thousand prisoners.

== See also ==
- List of libraries in Colombia
