= Giancarlo Mazzanti =

Colombian architect

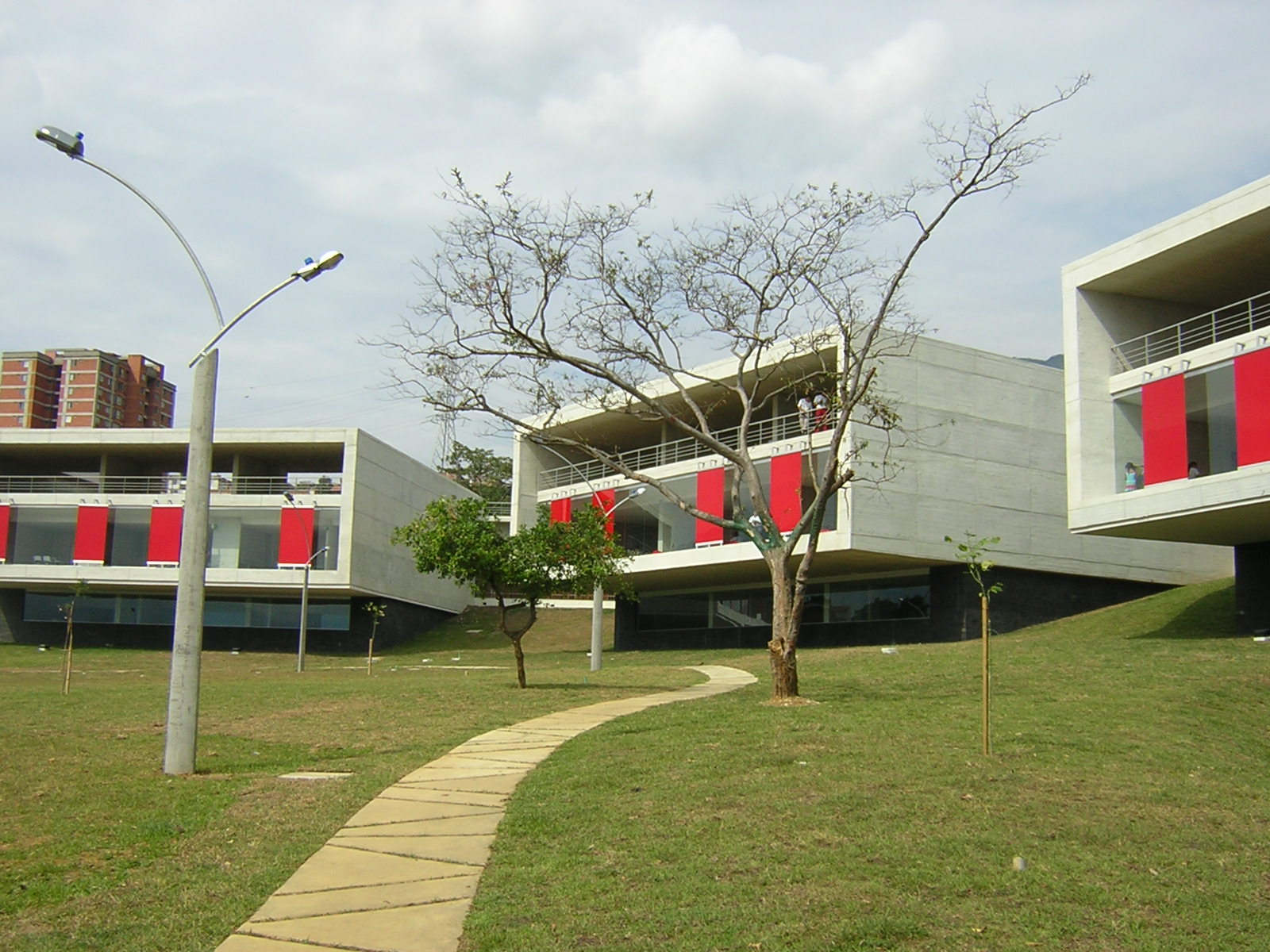
The León de Greiff Library and park

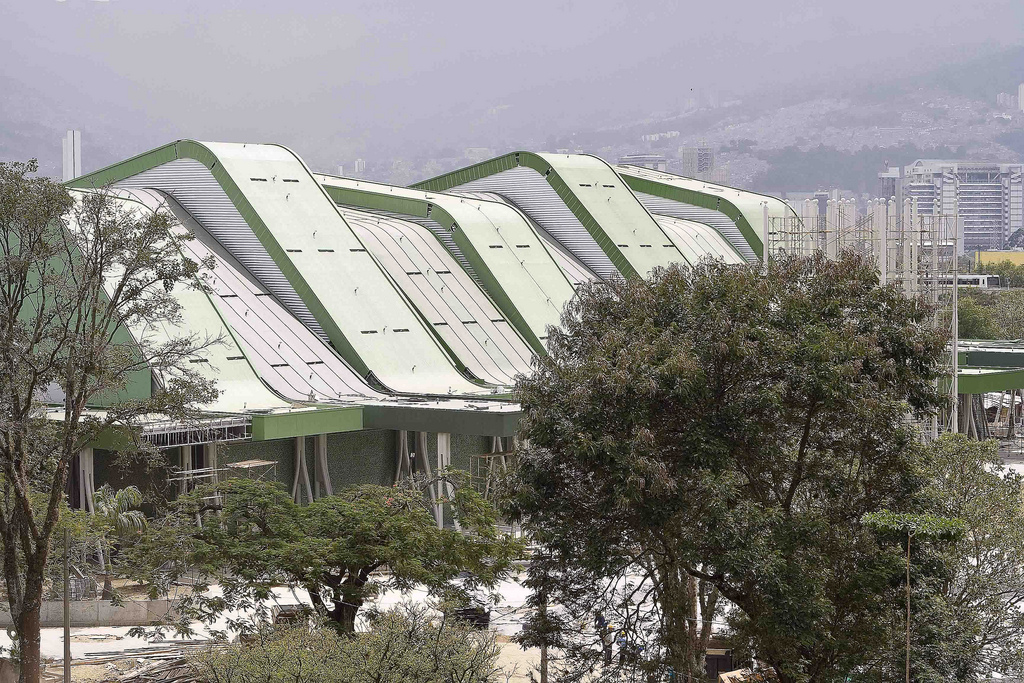
Atanasio Girardot Medellin Coliseum

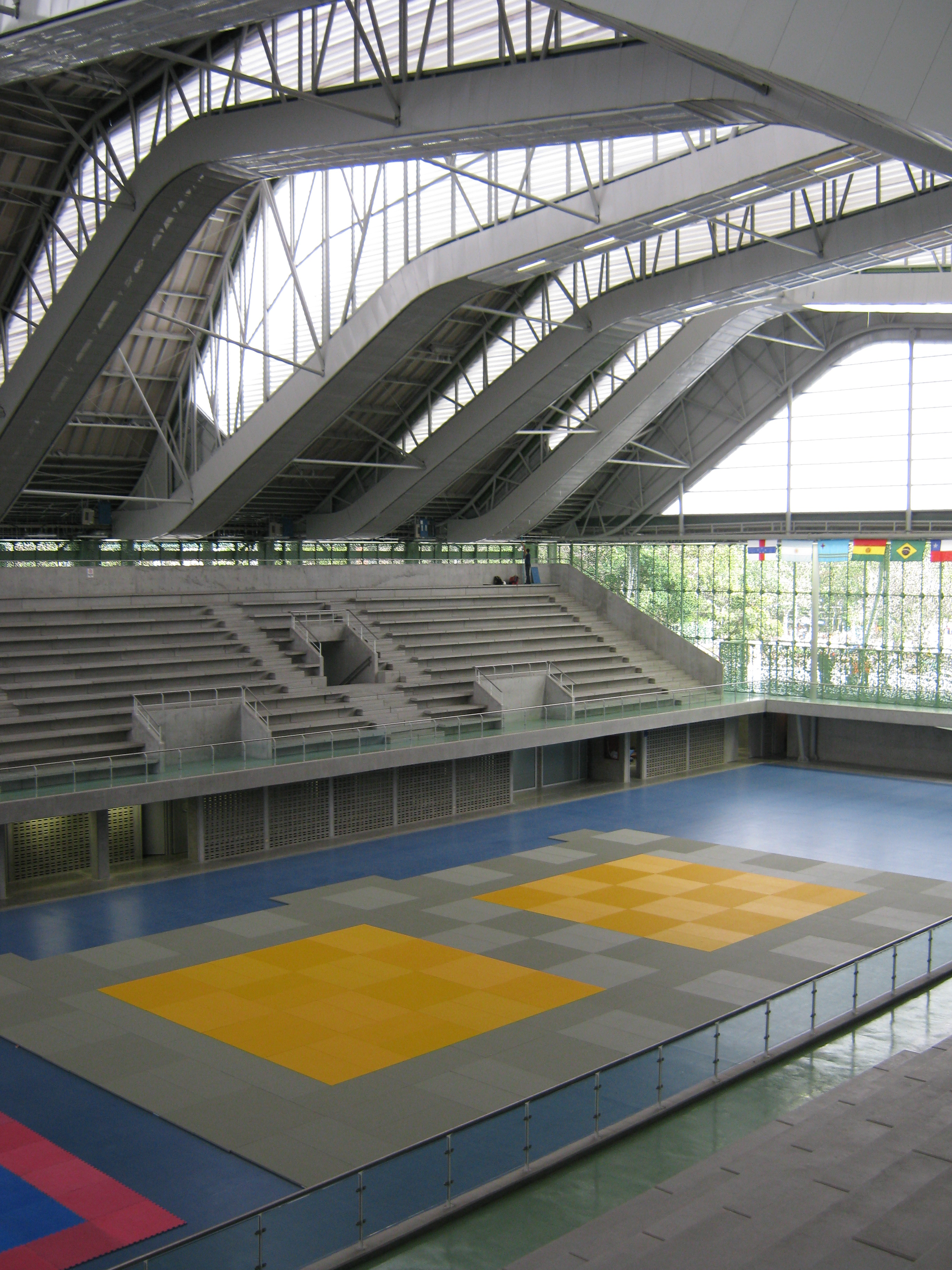
Interior view of Medellin's Atanasio Girardot Colisuem

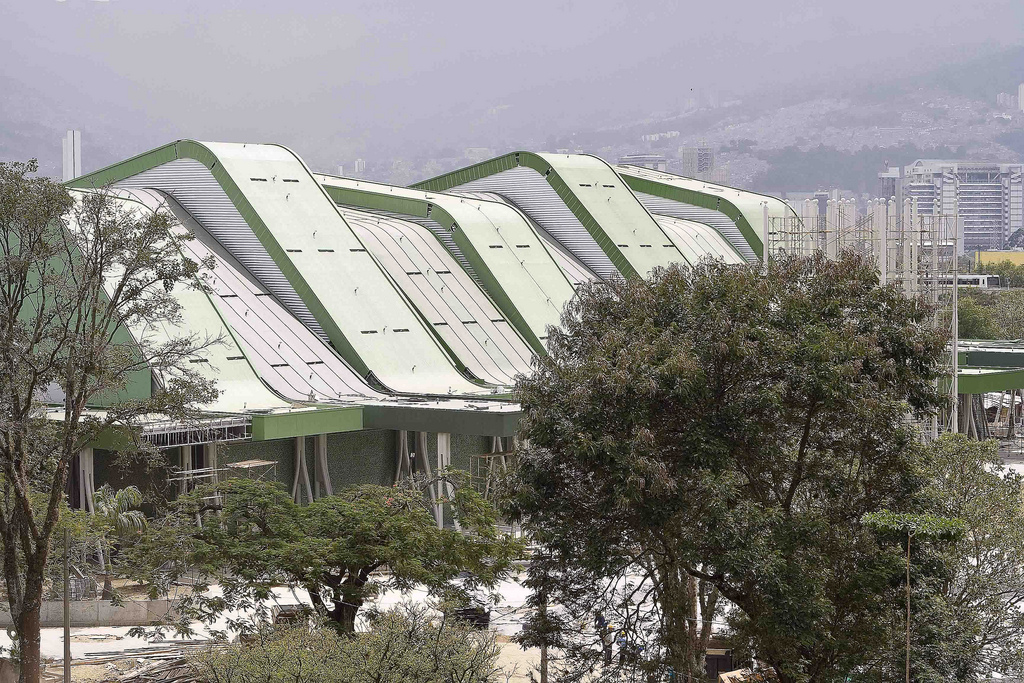

Giancarlo Mazzanti (born 1963) is a Colombian architect based in Bogota.

Mazzanti was born in Barranquilla, Colombia in 1963. He graduated with a bachelor's degree in architecture from the Pontifical Xaverian University in Bogotá (Pontificia Universidad Javeriana) in 1987. He received a graduate degree in history and theory of architecture and industrial design from the University of Florence, Italy in 1991.

Mazzanti's work includes the Biblioteca Parque España, the León de Greiff Public Library (Bibliotheca La Ladera) in Medellín, the Gerardo Molina Public School, the Nazca Restaurant, Habitar 72, Habitar 74, and the Medellin Coliseum (for the IX South American Games). He won the Global Award for Sustainable Architecture from the French Institute of Architecture (Cité de l'architecture et du patrimoine).

He also designed the El Porvenir Social Kindergarten in Bosa; the Gerardo Molina Public School in Suba; the Museo del Caribe in Barranquilla; the Third Millennium Park in the San Victorino neighborhood in Bogota; and various coliseums.

== Biography ==
Giancarlo Mazzanti (1963, Barranquilla, Colombia) is an architect of the Pontifical Xaverian University in Bogota, with a graduate degree in Industrial Design from the University of Florence in Italy (1991). He has taught at several Colombian universities and at Princeton, Harvard, and Columbia universities, and his work is exhibited in MoMA's and Pompidou’s permanent collections. Social values are at the core of Mazzanti's architecture projects. He searches for projects that empower transformations and build communities. Mazzanti has committed his professional life to the improvement of the quality of design of the build environment and the concept of social equality, his works reflect significant social shifts happening in Latin America today. His work has helped show that good design can lead to new identities for cities and their inhabitants, transgressing reputations of crime and poverty.

== Works ==
- Biblioteca Parque España
- León de Greiff Public Library (Bibliotheca La Ladera), Medellin
- Gerardo Molina Public School (2008)
- Nazca Restaurant
- Habitar 72
- Habitar 74
- Medellin Coliseum
