= Rafael Uribe Uribe Palace of Culture =

Coordinates: 6.2518°N 75.5677°W

- Palacio de la Cultura Rafael Uribe Uribe
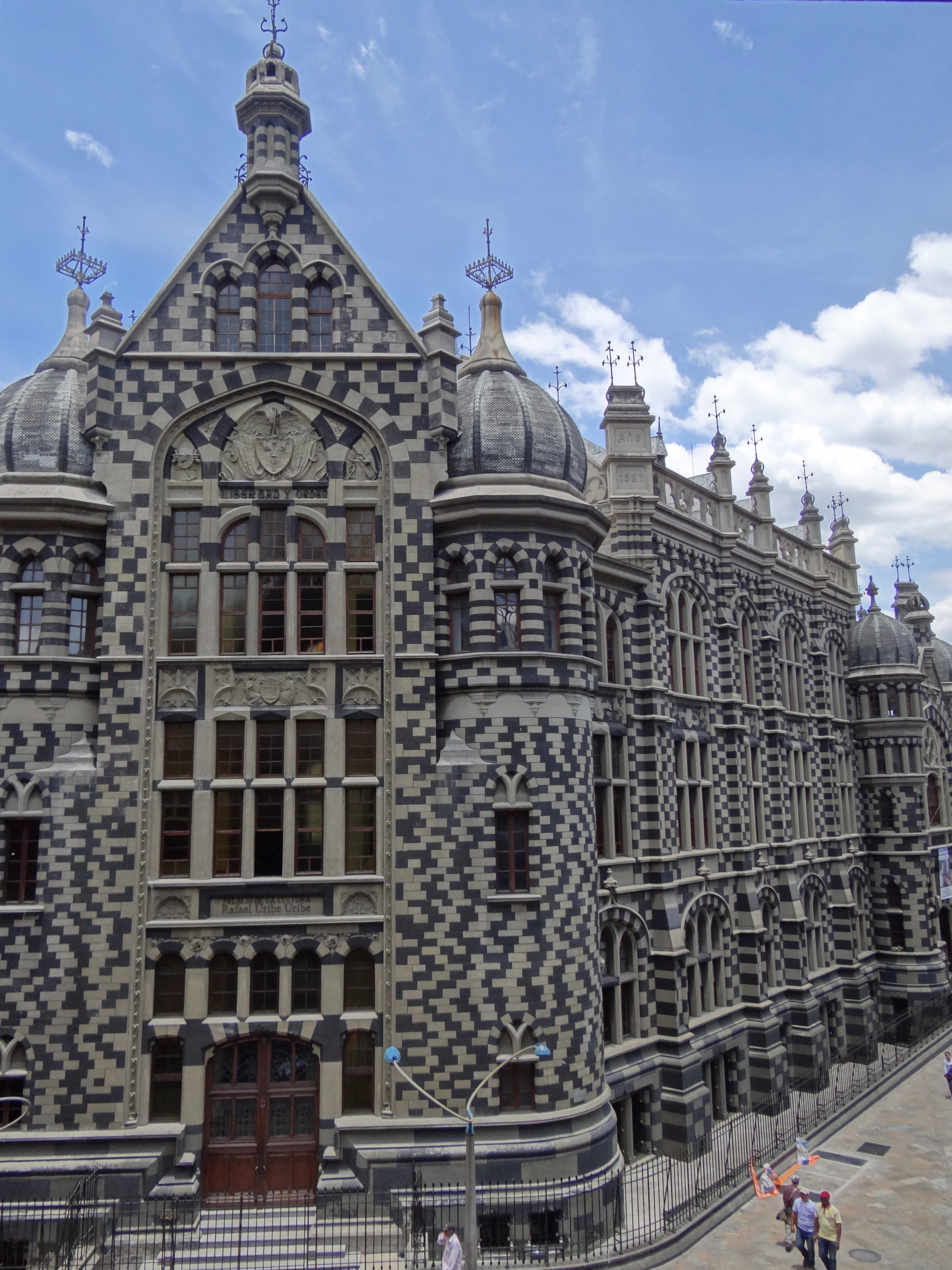
- Interactive map of the Rafael Uribe Uribe Palace of Culture area

General information
- Architectural style: Gothic Revival
- Location: Medellín, Colombia, 51st Avenue #52-03
- Construction started: 1925

Design and construction
- Architect: Agustín Goovaerts

The Rafael Uribe Uribe Palace of Culture is a public building in Medellín, that houses cultural programs related to the Department of Antioquia, such as concerts, conferences, and art exhibitions. Belgian architect Agustín Goovaerts designed the building in a Gothic Revival style. The palace was named after Rafael Uribe Uribe, a General for the Colombian Liberal Party.

The Palace of Culture has been designated a national monument of Colombia and is freely open to the public. It houses the Institute of Culture and Heritage of Antioquia. Visitors have access to the historical and photographical archive, music and sound archive, café, library, documentation center, permanent art gallery, and "Rafael Uribe Uribe" Museum room. The large dome located in the building is also used as an auditorium and a projection room, and can be used to watch movies.

== Location ==
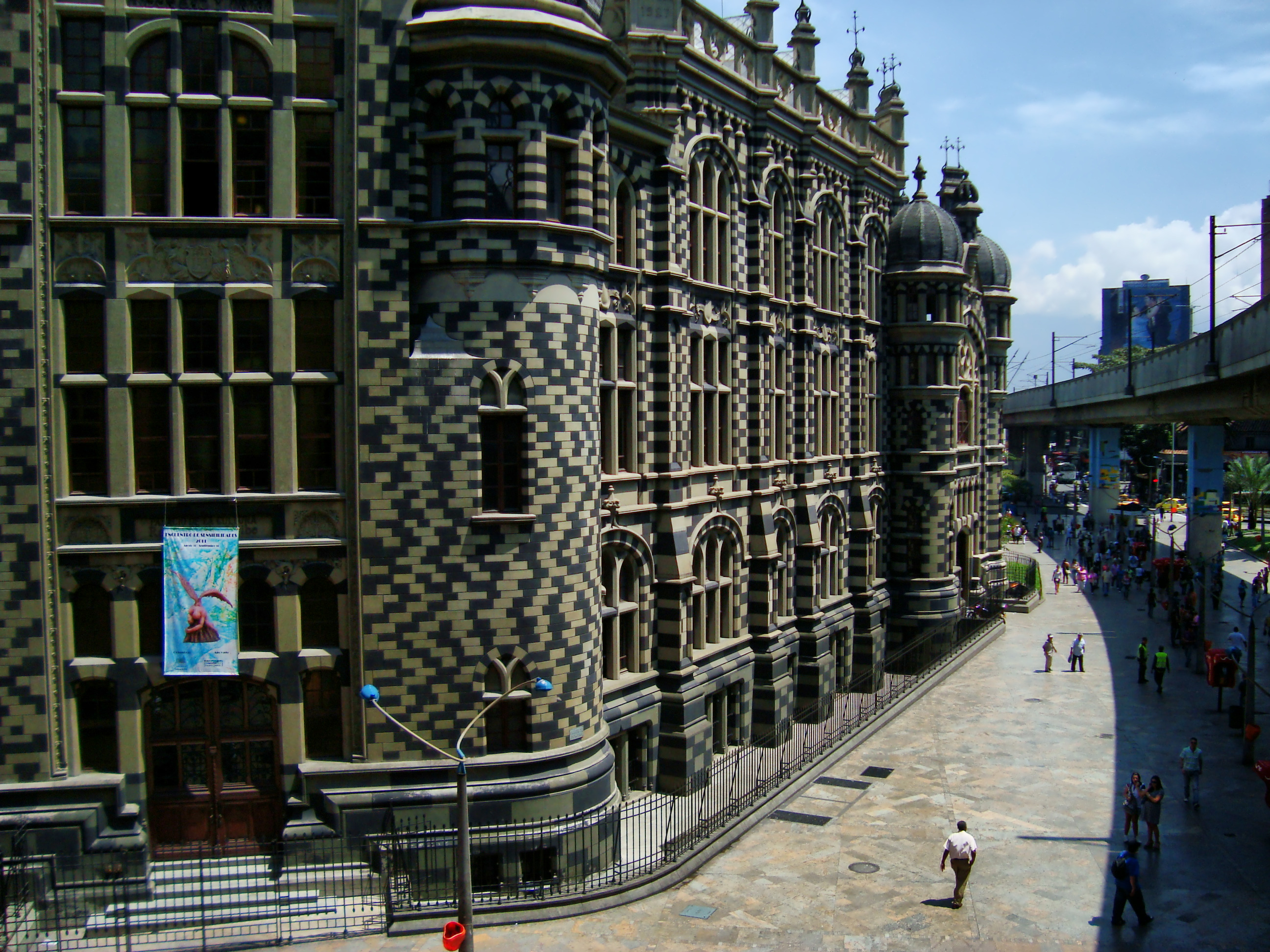
Pedestrians along the side of the palace.

It is located in the La Candelaria commune, in the central-eastern zone of Medellín. The building is located in an urban part of Medellín. There is a lot of foot traffic in the area, with Berrío Park station of the Medellín Metro, Botero Plaza, Berrío Park, Museum of Antioquia, Bolívar Park, and the Basilica of Our Lady of Candelaria all in close proximity.

== Early history ==
On April 17, 1826, the headquarters of the Governor of Santa Fe de Antioquia moved to Medellin and since that time, there was a discussion of the need to build a site that would house the administrative power in the region. The original headquarters was an old house on the corner of Bolívar Street and Boyacá Street. The house had two floors and 16 offices.

General Pedro Nel Ospina, who at the time was Governor of Antioquia and later became President of Colombia, requested the construction of this building and several others for Medellín in 1920. The original plans for the building were disputed, so that its final construction was more modest than originally planned. The Rafael Uribe Uribe Palace was originally the official building for the Government of Antioquia, and was known as "Calibío Palace". It was under construction from the 1925 to 1937 and designed by Belgian architect Agustín Goovaerts in a Gothic Revival style.

== Construction ==
=== First stage ===
Construction began in 1925 with a section at the intersection of Calibío Street and Bolívar Street. This part was to host the Archive and the Departmental Assembly. The work had to be suspended by order of the Governor Camilo C. Restrepo during the 1929 crisis. A deficit in the treasury delayed the construction for four years.

=== Second stage ===
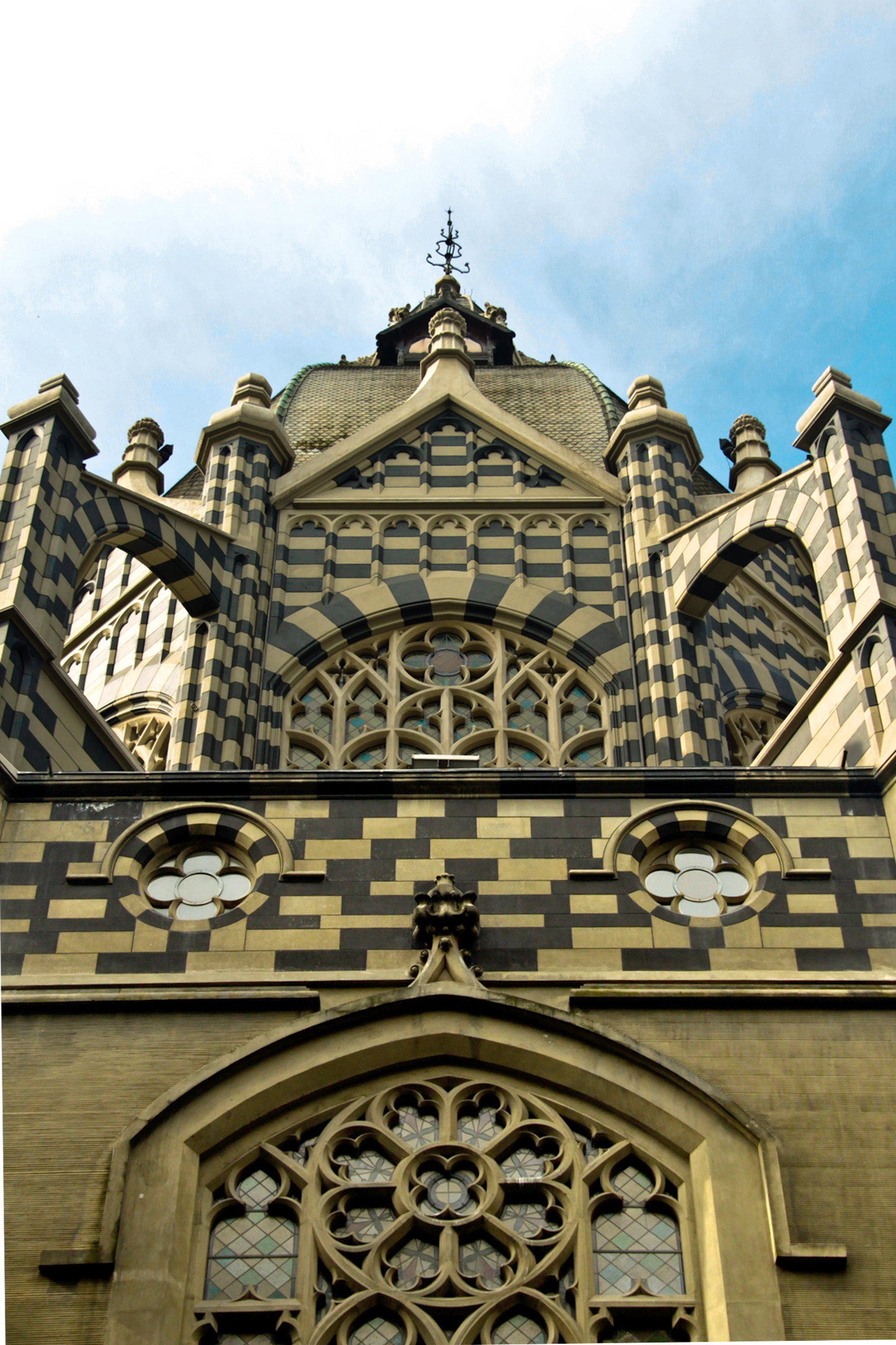
Depending on the sunlight, the white stones sometimes have a greenish hue.

After four years, building work was resumed in 1932. This construction stage involved the construction of the octagonal unit and the East Wing and the stairs with their hallways and balconies on Bolívar Street. Engineer and architect Jesús Mejía modified the plans for the balcony area because this space was going to be used for another purpose instead.

His work of interior decoration of the Assembly today is the Luis Lopez Auditorium Bureau. The interior also features bronze reliefs cast by Bernardo Vieco stands, a mural fresco "The Liberation of Slaves" by Ignacio Gómez Jaramillo, stained glass windows united with the ancient technique of leaded (joined by strands of lead) by the Horace and Arturo Longas brothers, and the central lamp.

=== Third stage ===
In 1937, the palace was abandoned by the government. The halls of the unfinished building were closed with makeshift fences. Because of this deteriorating situation, the government began to plan the construction of another building as the seat of government, which would be located on the grounds adjacent to the railroad station.

=== Final stage ===
The architects Gerardo Mejía, Gustavo Restrepo, and Gustavo Aristizabal were contracted to finish the construction. They led the construction of the north facade and regained some elements of the original decoration. Finally, in 1982, under the resolution 000002 of the National Council of National Monuments, the Palace was upgraded to a national monument.

== Name change ==
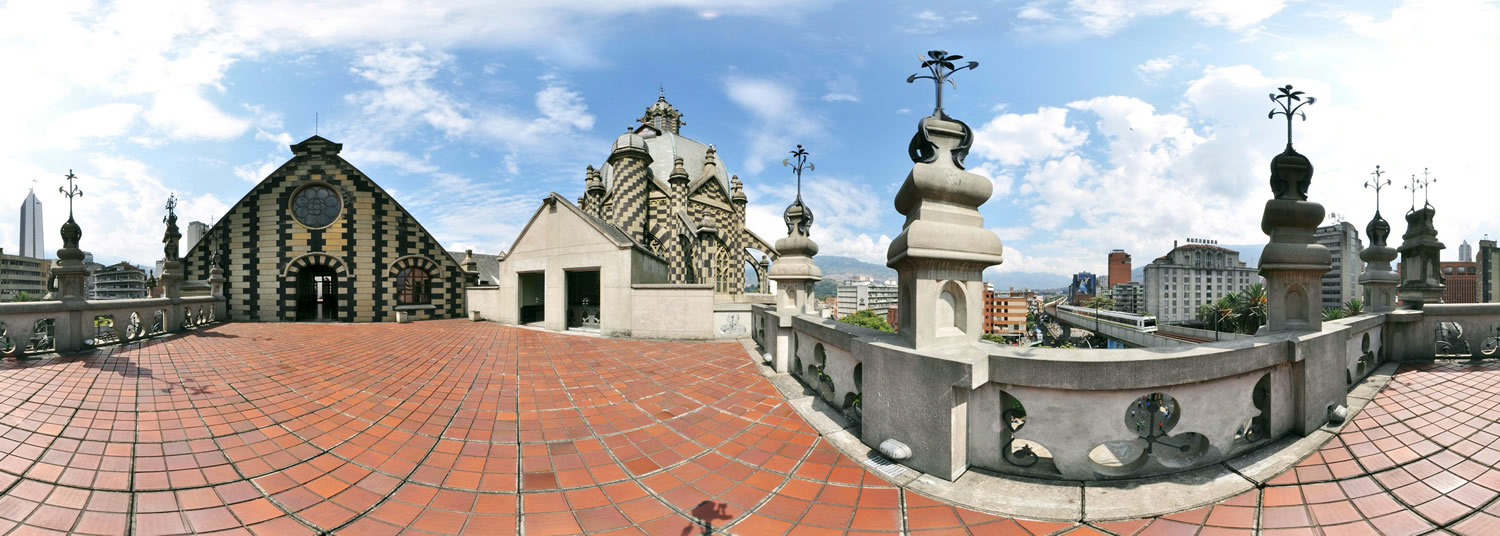
Wide angle view of the terrace and balcony.

The Governor's offices were moved to their new facilities in La Alpujarra Administrative Center. When it stopped being the government headquarters, the building was renamed "Rafael Uribe Uribe Palace of Culture" in 1987, in honor of Colombian general Rafael Uribe Uribe who fought in the Thousand Days War. Some people suggested that the Palace became a commercial center, just as had happened with the Major Seminary (now Villanueva Commercial Center) and the National Palace (now known as the National Palace Mall). Others suggested demolishing the Palace to build a new building.

The Palace was designated by Ordinance No. 59 of 1986 and No. 35 of 1988, to cultural activities. For this purpose, it was designated as the headquarters of the then "Directorate of Cultural Extension of the Ministry of Education and Culture of Antioquia", which is now known as the Institute for Culture and Heritage of Antioquia.

== Design ==
The original designed contained five floors with space for over 300 offices, a large hall for the Departmental Assembly, a library and a museum. Not all of these plans made it to the final construction. The Palace has four floors, a center courtyard and rooftop observation area.

The shell of the dome is a masterpiece of mathematical architecture. The metal supports were imported from Belgium in 1928 and their assembly was done according to the model used for the New York skyscrapers, heating the nuts and bolts until incandescent with a tightening effect, and giving strength to the structure despite the absence of welding.

== Gallery ==
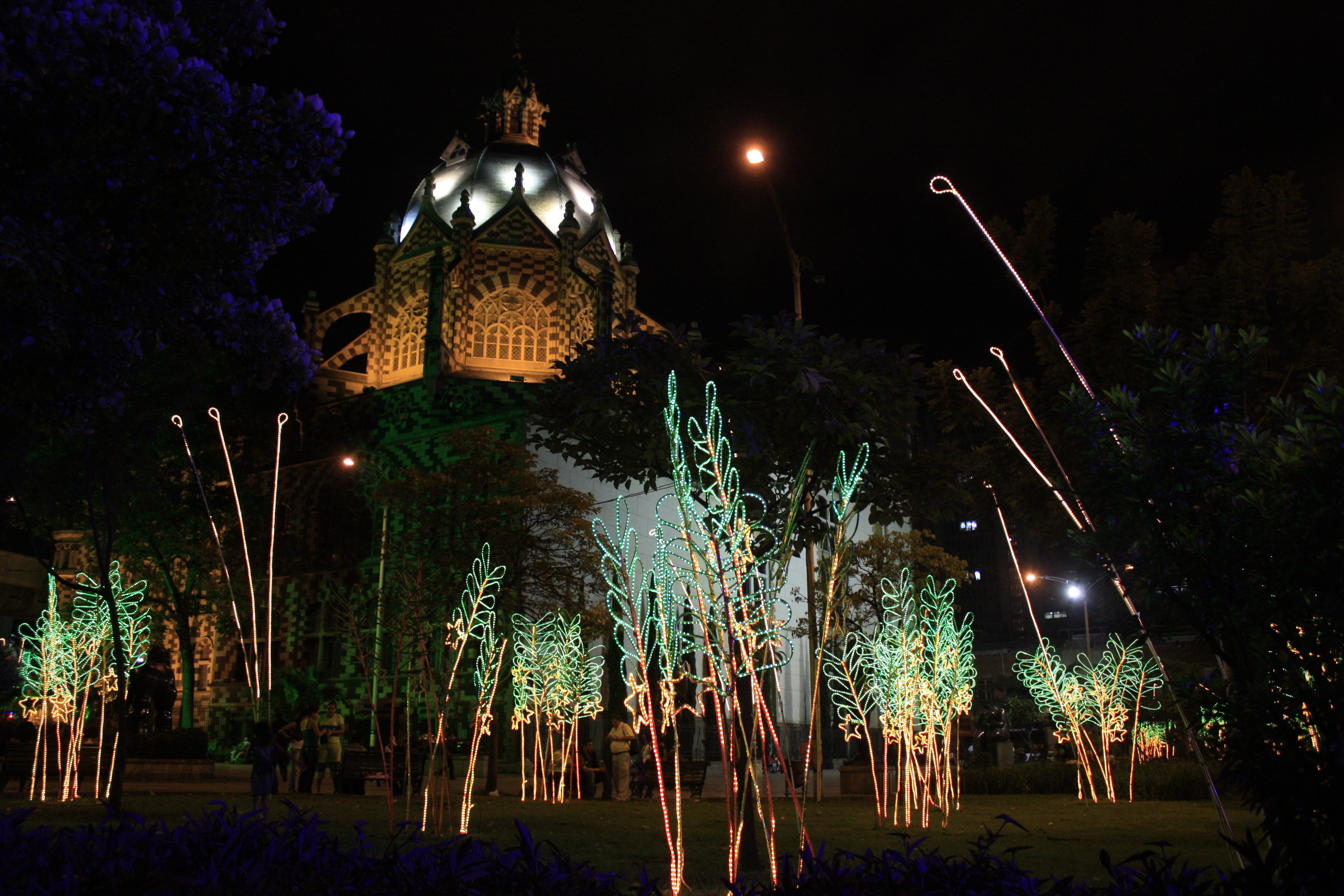
The palace lit during Christmas in Medellín.

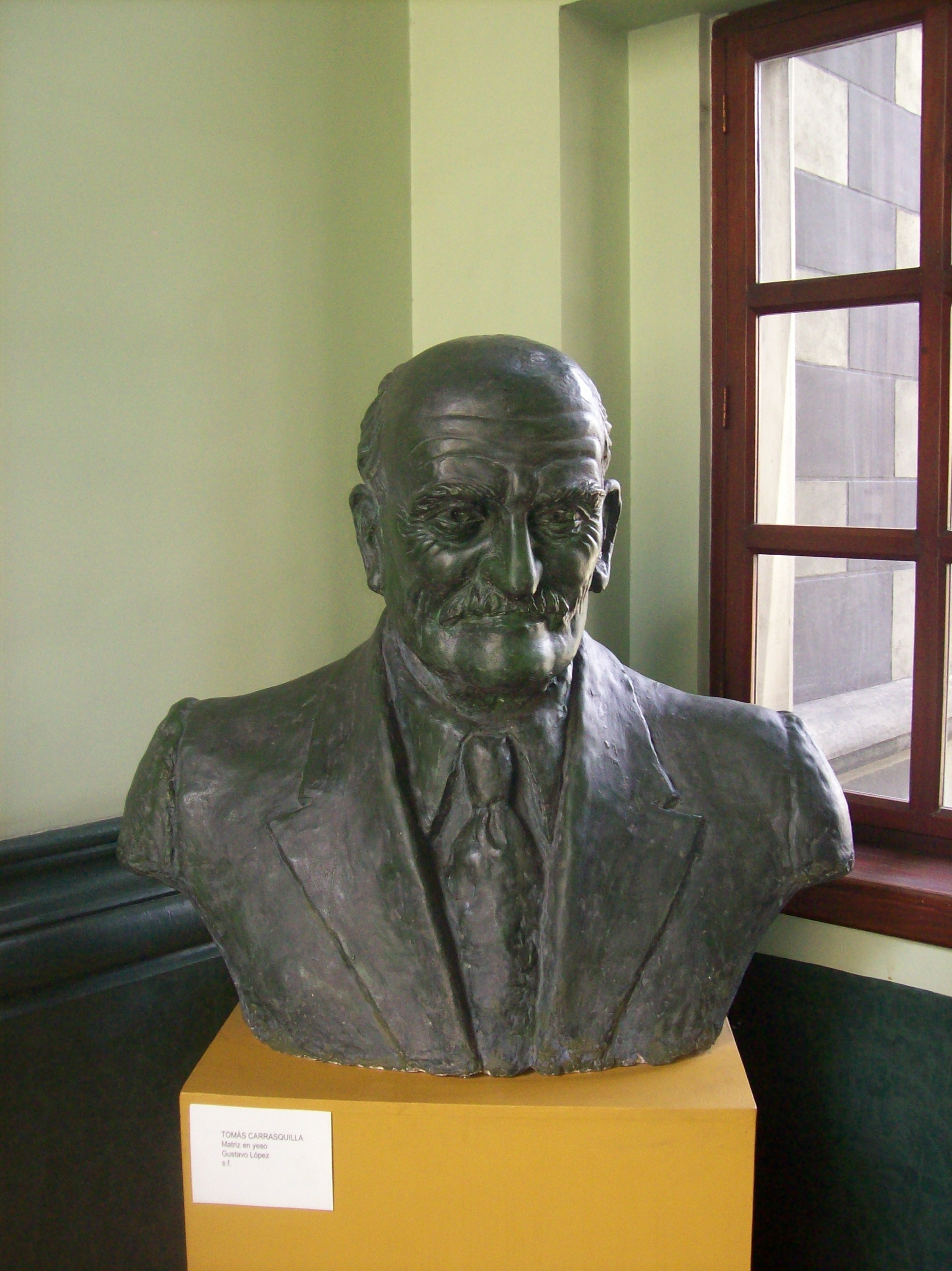
Bust of Colombian writer Tomás Carrasquilla.

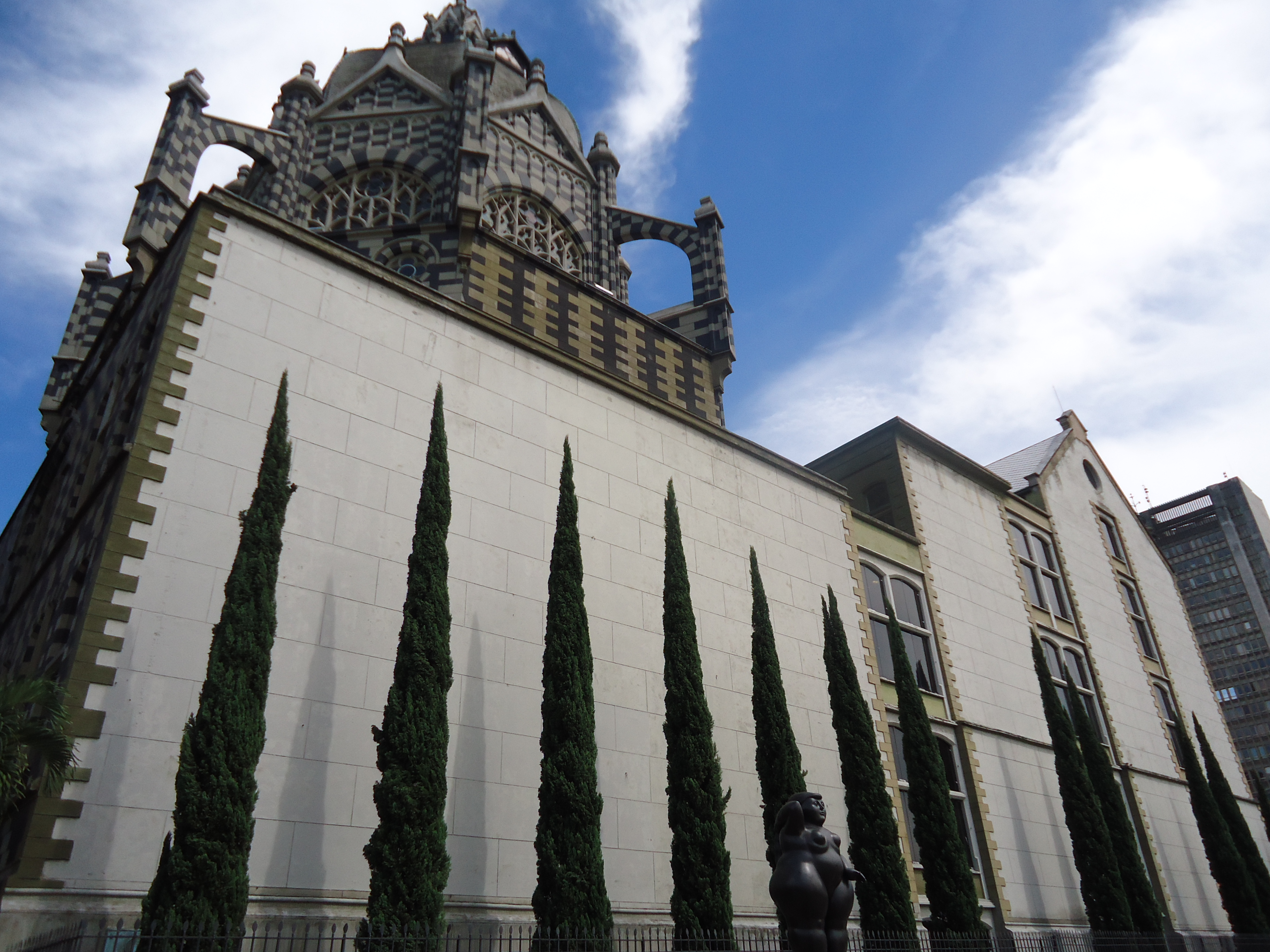
Side view of the palace.

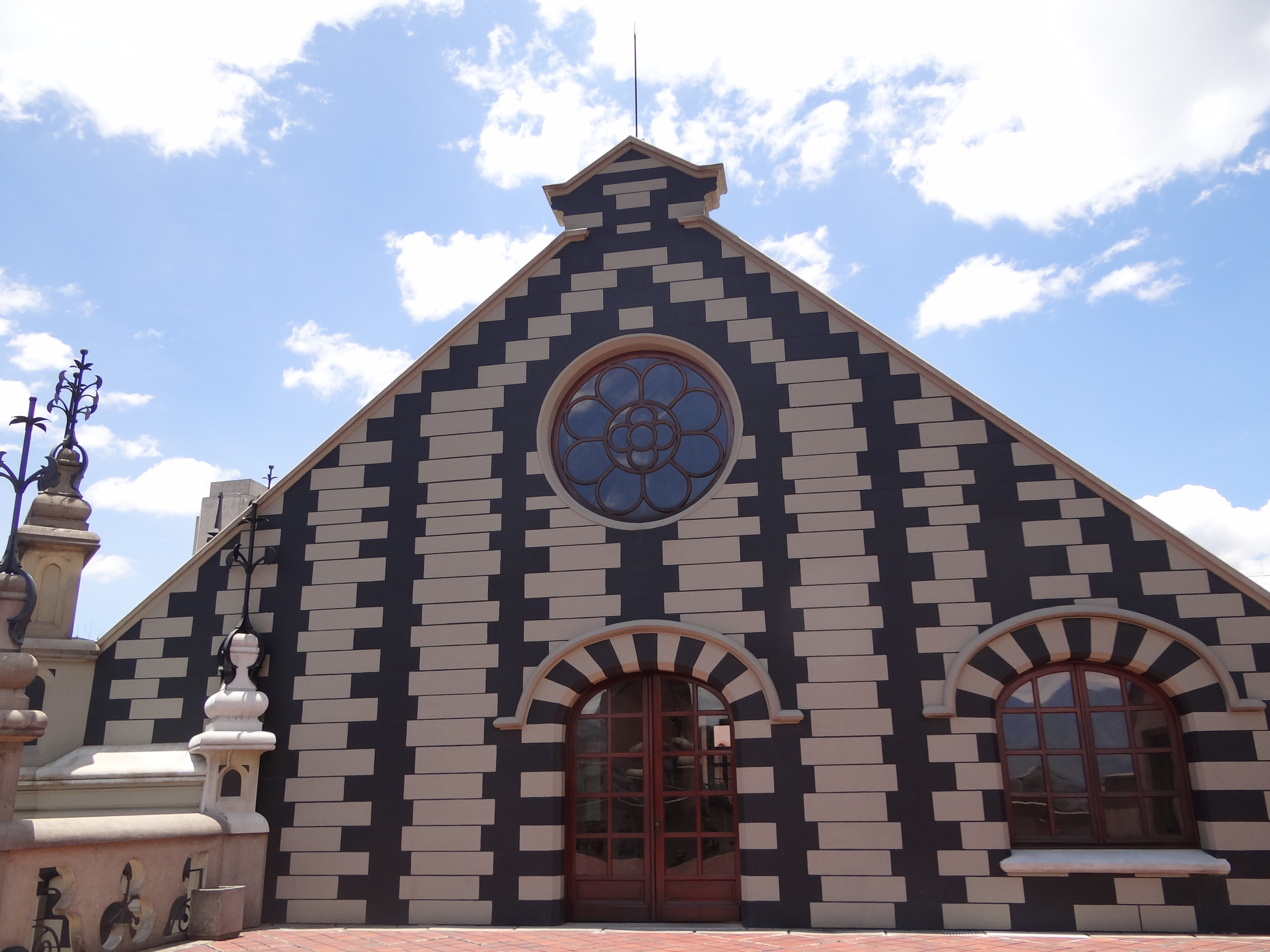
Rafael Uribe Uribe Palace of Culture terrace.

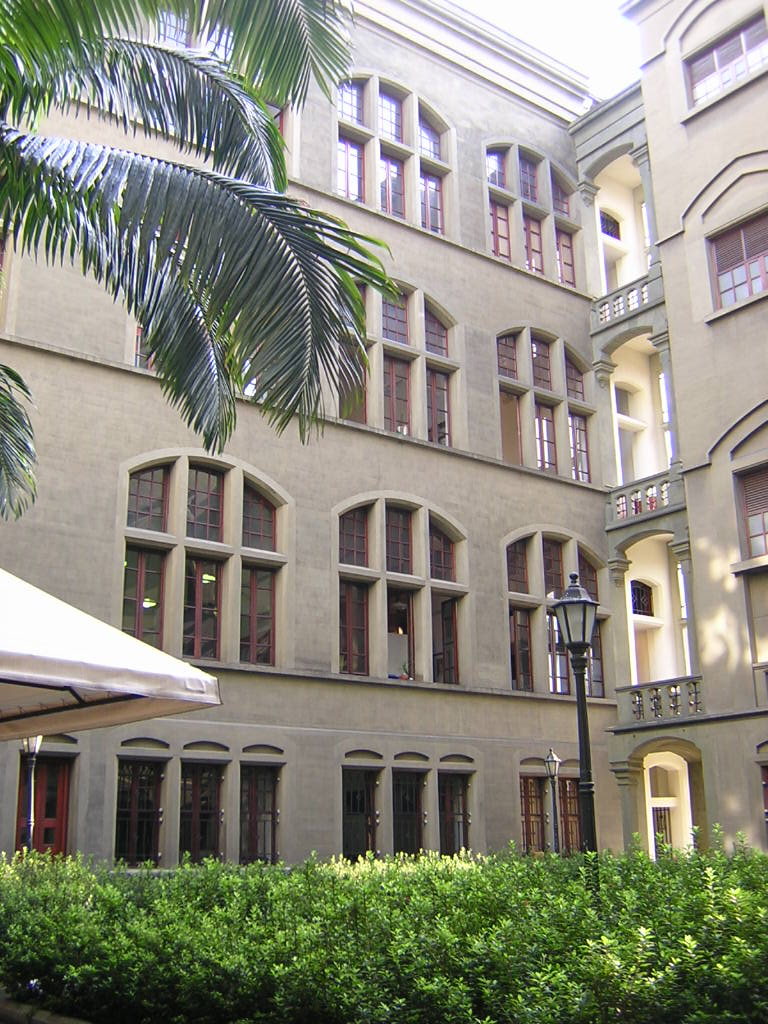
The façade of the building's interior.
