= Prado station (Medellín) =

Medellín metro station

Prado Estación Prado
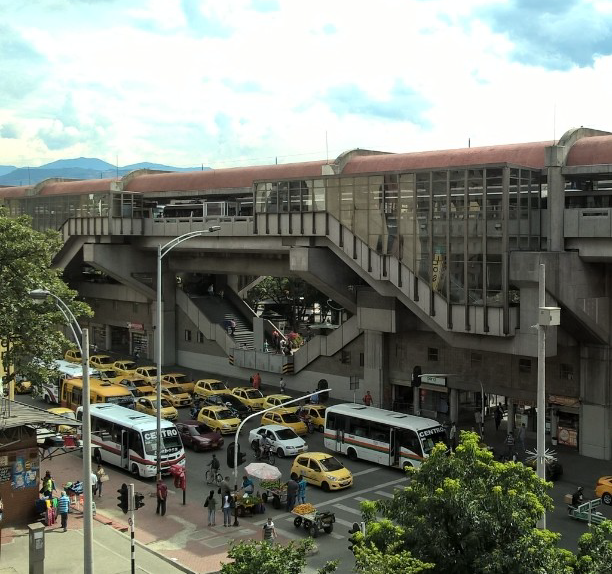

General information
- Location: Carrera 51 D # 57-100, Medellín; Colombia
- Coordinates: 6°15′25″N 75°33′58″W

History
- Opened: 30 November 1995; 30 years ago

Services
Preceding station	Medellín Metro	Following station
Hospital towards Niquía	Line A	Berrío Park towards La Estrella
Location

Prado is the ninth station on line A of the Medellín Metro going south. The station was opened on 30 November 1995 as part of the inaugural section of Line A, from Niquía to Poblado.

== Description ==
The station honors one of the old traditional neighborhood of Prado in Medellín. This station officially begins the downtown area of the city. Is it located on one of the main avenues in the center of Medellín: Eastern Avenue, which crosses the city center from north to south along the east and passes through an area of banks, theaters, parks, and cultural and recreational centers.

The station is located near Bolívar Park and the Metropolitan Cathedral of Medellín.
