= Metropolitan Cathedral of Medellín =

Coordinates: 6°15′14″N 75°33′50″W

- Metropolitan Cathedral Basilica of the Immaculate Conception
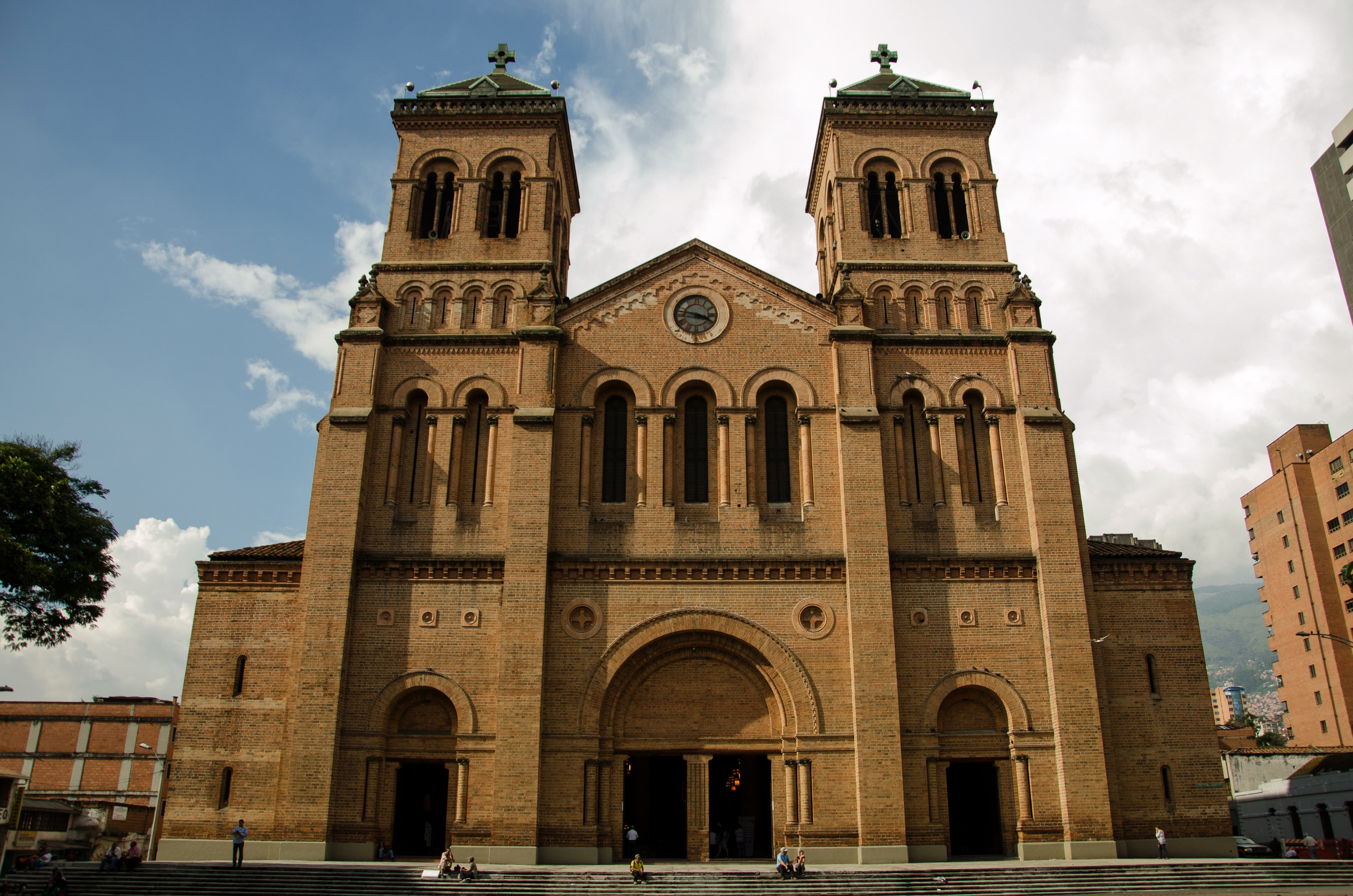
- Metropolitan Cathedral of Medellín
- Location: Medellín
- Country: Colombia
- Denomination: Roman Catholic

Administration
- Diocese: Roman Catholic Archdiocese of Medellín

The Metropolitan Cathedral of Medellín, officially the Metropolitan Cathedral Basilica of the Immaculate Conception, is a Catholic cathedral dedicated to the Virgin Mary under the title of the Immaculate Conception. It is located in the central zone of the Medellín (Colombia) in the Villanueva neighborhood on the north side of Bolívar Park. Additionally, the temple was formerly called and it is still known but to a lesser extent, as Villaneuva Cathedral, especially during its construction to distinguish it from the Basilica of Our Lady of Candelaria, which was the seat for the Episcopal see at the time.

== Overview ==
The cathedral is the principal church of the Roman Catholic Archdiocese of Medellin, home of the Archbishop and Metropolitan Chapter. It is also the headquarters of the "Cathedral Parish". In 1948, Pope Pius XII granted the temple the liturgical title of Minor Basilica by papal brief on June 12 of that year.

The building was designed by French architect Émile Charles Carré (1863-1909), in a Romanesque style, has a Latin cross, has three longitudinal aisles, in turn crossed by the transept or cross-ship, and its two towers are 66 meters in height at the withers. It is also a solid brick structure, since its construction approximately 1,120,000 bricks 8 cubic decimeters each (bound together with mortar) were used, which involve a volume of 97,000 meters cubed. For being one of the major architectural works of the country, it was declared a national monument of Colombia on 12 March 1982.

There are burials of religious people, including that of Cardinal Darío Castrillón Hoyos. In 2022, the Cathedral was the site of the beatification of María Berenice Duque, a nun who founded three congregations.

It also has a small museum of religious art located in a room adjacent to the basilica, consisting of four rooms that are not open to the public. The collection includes about 40 paintings (from the 17th, 18th and 19th centuries) and 15 sculptures (between the 18th and 19th centuries). The cathedral houses The Christ of Forgiveness by Colombian artist Francisco Antonio Cano Cardona.

== Gallery ==

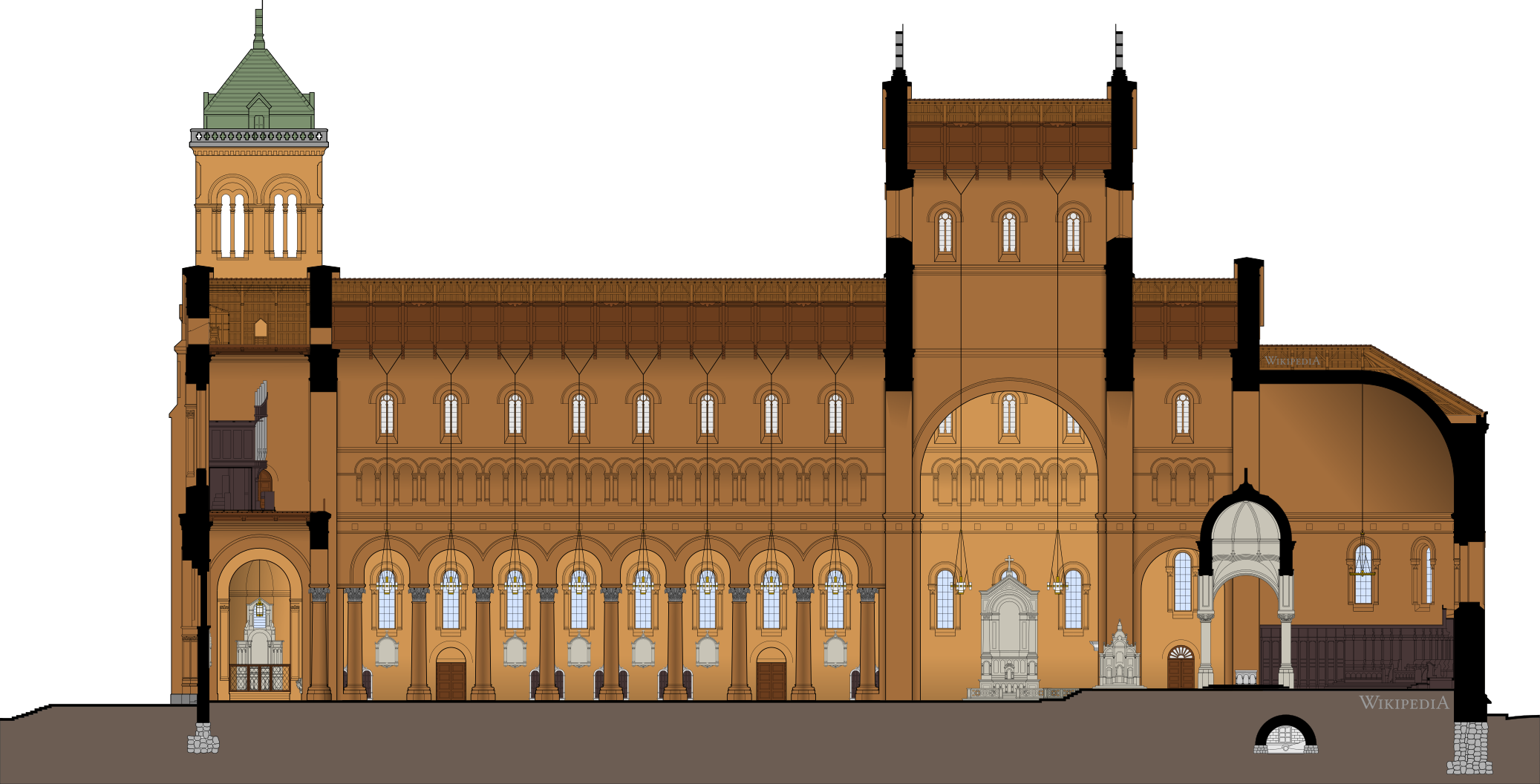

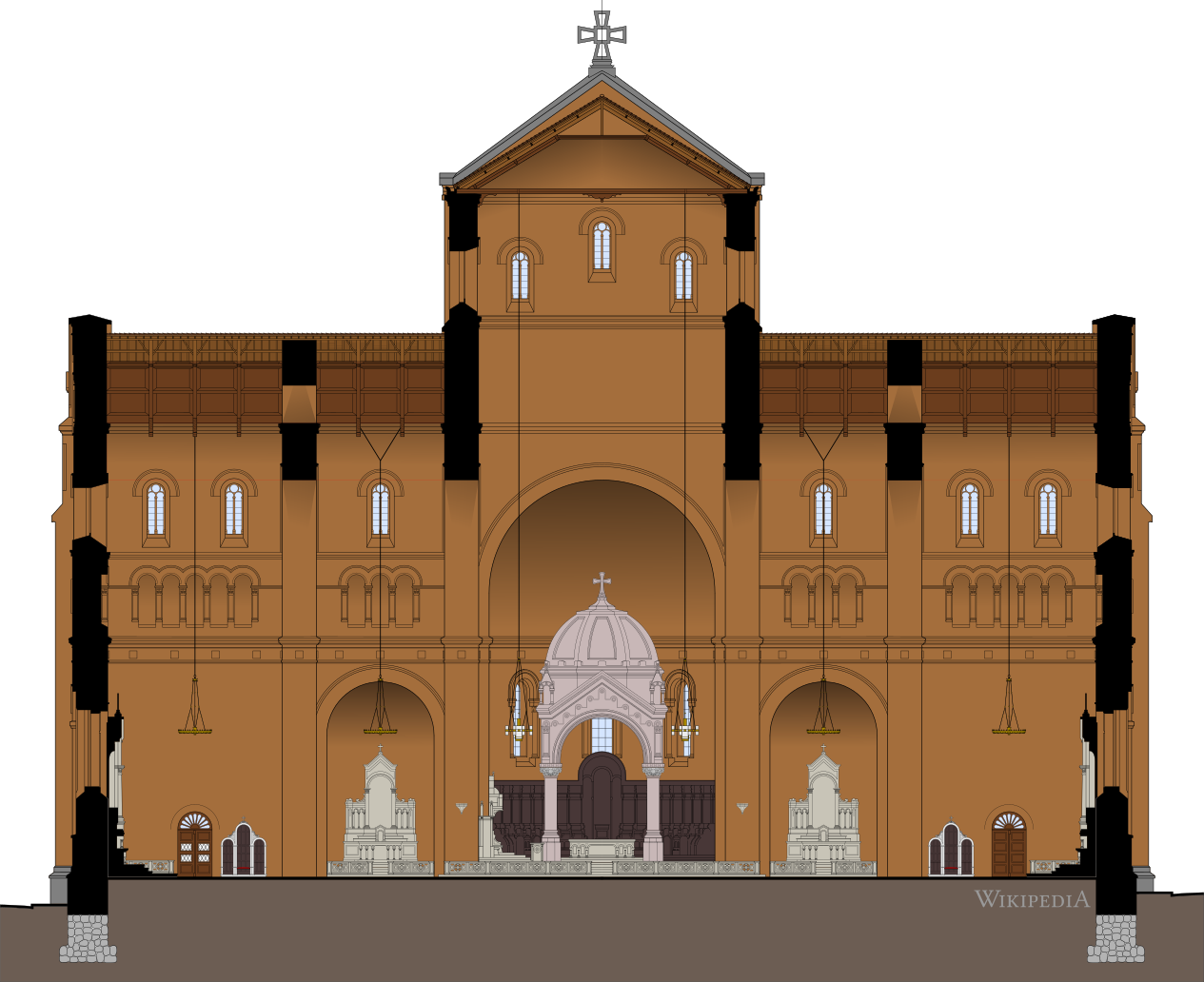
