= Festival de Ancón =

Colombian rock festival

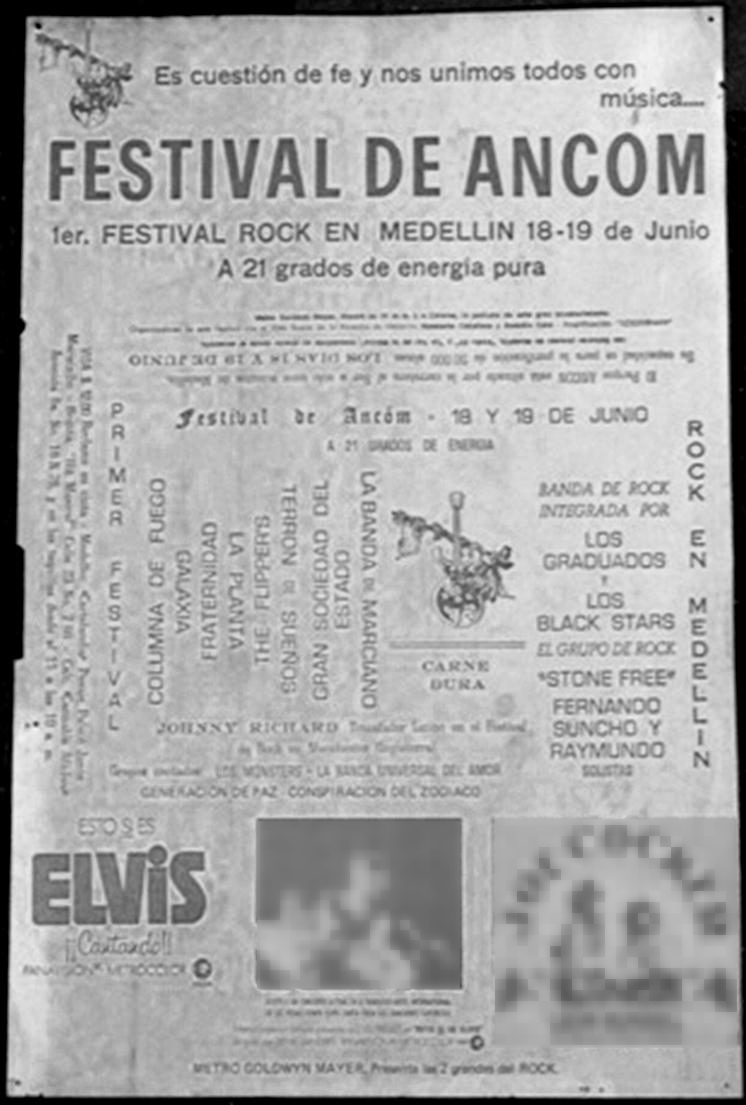
Poster of the Ancom Festival [Sic], with the list of participating bands and advertising for the films Elvis: That's the Way It Is and Joe Cocker, Mad Dogs & Englishmen.

The Ancón Festival was a Colombian rock festival held in La Estrella, Antioquia, a municipality near Medellín, between 18 and 20 June 1971. Due to the impact of the event in the media and the wide diffusion it had, it has been classified on numerous occasions by the press as the "Colombian Woodstock" or as the main meeting of the hippie in that country.

== Background ==
At the end of the 1960s, with the spread of rock music, the hippie movement experienced a notable growth in cities such as Bogotá, Medellín and Cali, which motivated the formation of numerous projects linked to the spread of rock music. In Bogotá, the main hippie meeting point of the time was established in the park on Carrera Séptima and Calle 60, a space that was used for concerts, happenings and poetry recitals. This experience was taken to other spaces in the city such as the National Park (during the Festival de la Vida in 1970), the La Comedia theater (now the Teatro Libre de Chapinero) and the Lijacá sector.

The success of these events would motivate the organization of the Ancón Festival in Medellín.

== Organization ==
There are at least two versions about how the festival was organized.

The most widely spread story in the media is that Gonzalo Caro Carolo, a well-known hippie from Medellín, imagined the festival while he was resting on a beach in San Andrés under the effects of LSD. The lot where it would take place, for its part, was chosen during a trip by Caro to the region in search of psilocybin mushrooms.

Other versions of rock music promoters of those years, maintain that Humberto Caballero (the now deceased leader of the hippie movement in Bogotá), promoted the festival due to the success that previous events had had in the capital and that the capital of Antioquia was chosen because it was the area where Gonzalo Caro (who already had experience in the city as an organizer of shows) helped to process the permits for its realization.

However, it is confirmed by primary sources that it was Carolo who had the idea and was the main organizer of the event with the help of other organizers from Medellin.

Both versions agree that tickets were sold for 13 pesos and 20 cents, and that they sold out quickly due to the great expectations generated by the event. The festival's name was due to the fact that it was held near the sector of the Aburrá Valley known as "Ancón Sur." The event had the unconditional support of the mayor of Medellín, the conservative Álvaro Villegas, who for his role in its realization was exaggeratedly described as "the hippie mayor" by the newspaper El Colombiano.

== Festival development ==
Under the motto It is a matter of faith and united with music, the festival began on 18 June.

Most of the bands that were currently enlivening the Colombian rock scene performed on the stage, some of which were short-lived: La Columna de Fuego (with Roberto Fiorilli), La Planta (the foundation of what would soon become Malanga, with Augusto Martelo and Chucho Merchán), Terrón de Sueños, La Banda del Marciano, Gran Sociedad del Estado, Carne Dura, and even a rock band made up of members of the tropical orchestras Los Black Stars and Los Graduados (both based in the capital of Antioquia). Among the bands formed in Medellín that stood out at the festival were Los Monsters, Conspiración del Zodiaco, La Banda Universal del Amor, Los Láser, and Free Stone. The most experienced group of the time, Los Flippers, although featured in the festival's publicity, chose not to perform.

Most of the attendees, from all over the country, initially gathered in Medellín's Bolívar Park to leave for the concert. Despite the distribution of tickets, there was not enough and some people risked entering the venue by swimming across the Medellín River. Although some stayed in hotels in the city centre, most attendees chose to camp in the Ancón Sur lot despite the cold and rain. The centre of the activities was a large metal booth that served as a stage. The improvisation that characterized the event led journalist Germán Castro Caycedo (who covered it for El Tiempo) to speak of "something put together with more good will than knowledge."

== Controversy ==
The festival was opposed by influential sectors of Medellin society, such as the Association of Private Schools of Antioquia and the Archdiocese of Medellin, headed by Archbishop Tulio Botero Salazar, who saw it as an insult to youth and Catholic customs. The pressure exerted by this movement led to the resignation of the mayor of Medellin, Alvaro Villegas.

Regarding this situation, Gonzalo Caro said in 2005:

The festival took away Medellin's virginity. That's why the priests, politicians and mothers of those who came as girls and turned out hippies were up in arms.

However, outside of the moralistic debate, some have downplayed the festival's probable historical importance for Medellín, as is the case of journalist Juan José García:

I don't think that the Festival was, as has been said in a somewhat over-emphasizing tone, a complete expression of protest. The ideological message was too simple. And the hippies, those who were there, took the matter more as a walk, as a "camping" in their own way, than as a demonstration of discontent or a protest show. It is exaggerated when the Ancón Festival is cited as a sort of historical point of reference.
