= Agustín Goovaerts =

Belgian architect

Augustin Goovaerts
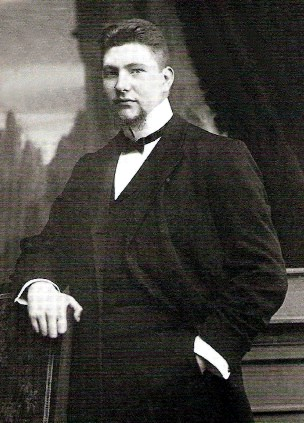
- Born: 31 May 1885; Schaerbeek, Brussels, Belgium
- Died: 15 August 1939 (aged 53–54); Brussels, Belgium
- Education: Catholic University of Louvain
- Occupation: Architect
- Buildings: Rafael Uribe Uribe Palace of Culture

Augustin André Alphonse Pierre Goovaerts (often Agustín Goovaerts, May 31, 1885 – August 15, 1939) was a Belgian architect and engineer. He designed a number of important private and public buildings, particularly in Medellín, Colombia, where he worked as the department of Antioquia's official architect during the 1920s. Some of his works have been declared National monuments in Colombia.

== Biography ==
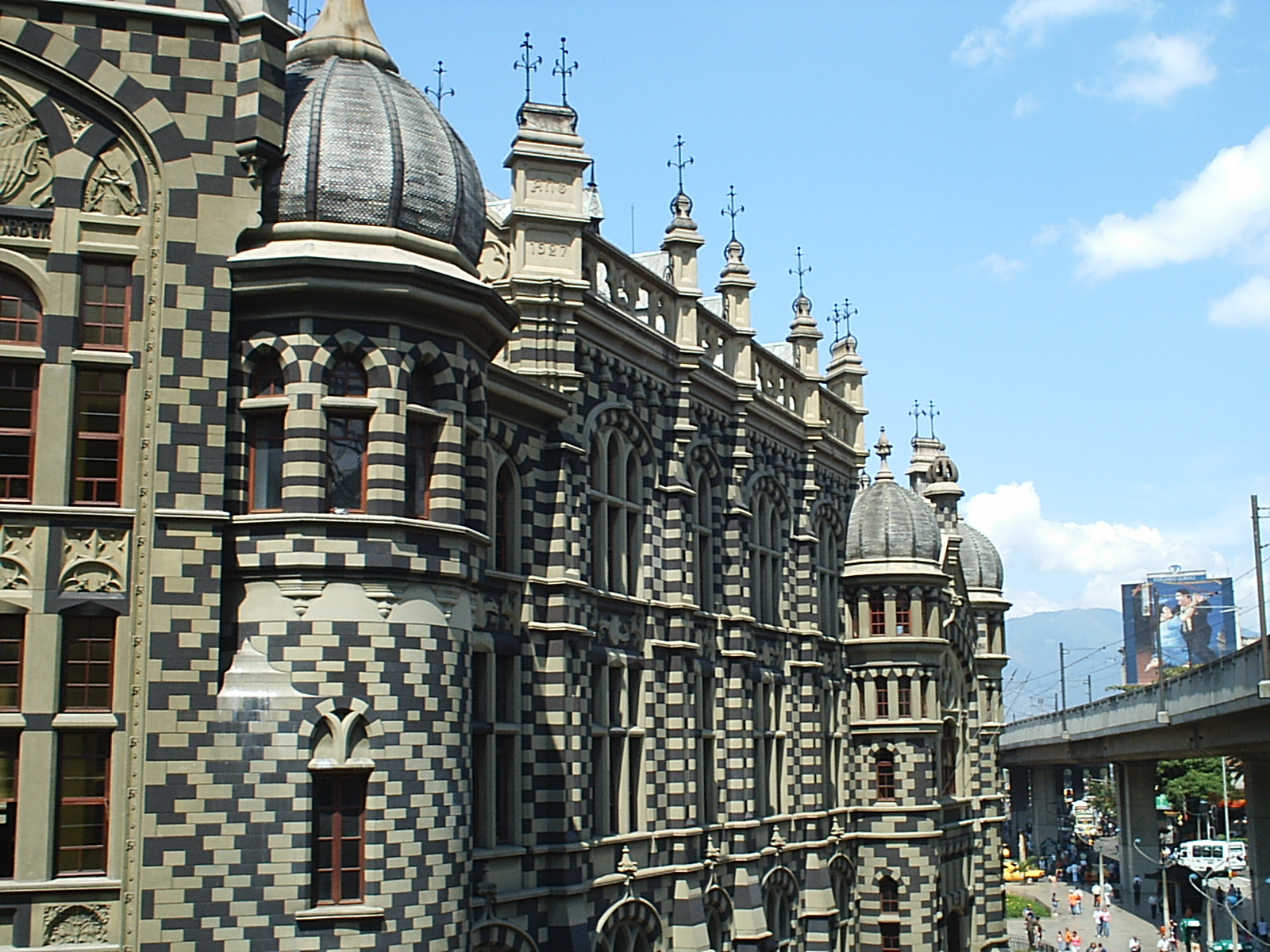
Rafael Uribe Uribe Palace of Culture in Medellín, Colombia

Goovaerts was born in Schaerbeek (present-day Brussels, Belgium) in 1885. He was the son of Celina and Alfonso Van Engelgeny (1847–1922), a leading intellectual in the European academic circles, as a librarian in Antwerp and later as a senior archivist of the Kingdom of Belgium. His mother was a polyglot, historian, musicologist, genealogist, and editor.

At a young age, Goovaerts began studying drawing at the Academy of Arts in Brussels, which he later completed in addition to architecture and engineering at the University of Leuven. Mandatory practices for students at Belgian universities allowed him to have direct contact with the work of Victor Horta, who was at the time working on the old Abbey of La Cambre, and the Dutch architect Hendrik Petrus Berlage. He resided in Etterbeek, the fashionable Brussels neighborhood where he received his first commissions. These included his own home, completed in 1907, and residences for the Desmet-Sillis and Desvaux-Berleur families. He worked for a time in the office of the architect Edmond Serneels (1875–1934), where he was responsible for the construction of the Church of Saint-Anthony of Padua in Etterbeek, finished in 1910.

In 1916, he married Jeanne Marie Desmet (Namur, 1889 – Etterbeek, 1985). The pair was athletic; both of them loved tennis and competitive swimming. The marriage appears to have been happy, as they had five children, all born abroad: Jean (born in Vernon, France), Godefroid (born in Bizy, one of the communes of Vernon), and three others born in Medellín.

In 1914, he volunteered as a soldier at the beginning of the First World War. He was discharged from military service because of wounds suffered in combat. However, he continued as an active military organizer of a bilingual education network in Calais, the Belgian military barracks on the border with France. Before that, Goovaerts had taught drawing at the Belgian Military Institute of Vocational Rehabilitation. He remained in military service until the end of the war in 1918, when he returned to architectural practice, with his wife becoming his assistant. However, the difficult economic climate in Belgium at the close of the war prompted Goovaerts to seek employment abroad. He was contacted by the Minister of the Interior of the department of Antioquia in Colombia, and offered the post of the official departmental architect-engineer.

On March 10, 1920, Goovaerts arrived in Medellín, the capital and largest city of the department, which at the time counted barely 100,000 residents and was only beginning to industrialize. Although Colombia had been impoverished by the Thousand Days War, and it had lost Panama in a revolution (instigated by the United States, which wanted to build a canal across the isthmus), its infrastructure was expanding. The Antioquia Railway network was approaching completion and in 1920 the department established the Empresas Públicas Municipales, its public utilities company and forerunner of the modern EPM, which became responsible for powering the electric streetcar network starting the next year, along with the municipal slaughterhouse and lighting on Medellín's market square. The country still had few professional architects, however, and most buildings remained adaptations of older colonial patterns, with materials besides adobe, wattle and daub, and wood being infrequently used.

The 1920s continued this spate of economic and infrastructural expansion in Colombia, building also on the success of the coffee industry, which had enjoyed initial boom periods in the nineteenth century and entered another era of prosperity in the 1910s. Goovaerts joined the firm of local Medellín architect Félix Mejía, a member of the Colombian progressive literary and artistic movement called Los Panidas. He also worked alongside the regional painter Georges Brasseur, who he helped bring to Colombia and establish his own career footing. Goovaerts received numerous commissions from the regional government and private citizens during his time in the country, which lasted just over eight years. In the first half of his stay, between 1921–1924, he received his largest commissions, including the Junín Theater (1922–1924, now demolished). In June 1920, Goovaerts began construction of the Antioquia Governor's Office building, his first government commission, but due to the department's financial difficulties, the project had to be postponed and was only opened four years later, reduced to a quarter of its original size.

Nonetheless, Goovaerts' government work brought him additional private and ecclesiastical commissions. He was hired to design residences, hotels, restaurants, and theaters, along with the interior or exterior renovations of many religious buildings, such as the such as the Sacred Heart of Jesus Church in the Guayaquil neighborhood. A number of his buildings have since been listed as national monuments. Many of his houses are located in affluent areas such as the Prado neighborhood in what was then the northeast part of the city. In 1920, he also taught at the School of Mines, where he directed the architectural drawing and design courses. Since Medellín did not have a school of architecture at the time, Goovaerts proposed that in the final semester of the Civil Engineering curriculum, students complete an internship in architects' offices to address the shortage of trained professionals.

On August 17, 1928, the Goovaerts family departed for Brussels by train, via Puerto Berrío. Following the transatlantic crossing, they settled at the family home on the rue Franklin in Brussels. Goovaerts resumed his practice, designing the Santhoven Mission Seminary of the Sacred Heart Fathers, which was inaugurated on September 20, 1932. With the onset of the Great Depression, construction work in Belgium again slowed, and Goovaerts found work in other related industries. He managed a holiday home in Grand Manil, surveyed real estate, and designed a new monument for Cardinal Désiré-Joseph Mercier in Louvain, and oversaw the writing and layout of Ediciones Servir, a press publication covering various tourism and technical topics. In 1934, he was entrusted with the management of the Pavilion of Catholic Life at the 1935 International Exposition in Brussels.

He died at the age of 58 in Brussels due to leukemia caused by typhoid.

== Style ==
When Goovaerts arrived in Colombia, he came with a lot of knowledge to implement. There was division between two stylistic tendencies: a very traditional, orthodox and academic type and an oriented position with the avant-garde, especially the Art Nouveau and modernism. The first was reflected more in public buildings and the second in his work for individuals.

Goovaerts was involved in the design and construction of more than 40 religious buildings.

== Selected works ==
- National Palace, Colombia (1925)
- Rafael Uribe Uribe Palace of Culture, Colombia (1920–1930)
- Edificio Gonzalo Mejía, Medellín, Colombia (1922–1924) (Junín Theatre and Hotel Europa)
- Church of the Sacred Heart of Jesus, Colombia (1924–1939)
- College of Medicine, University of Antioquia
- Church of San José of El Poblado (1926)
- Monument in the San Pedro Cemetery Museum for Camilo Restrepo (1926)
- Chapel for the San Pedro Cemetery Museum (1925)

== Gallery ==
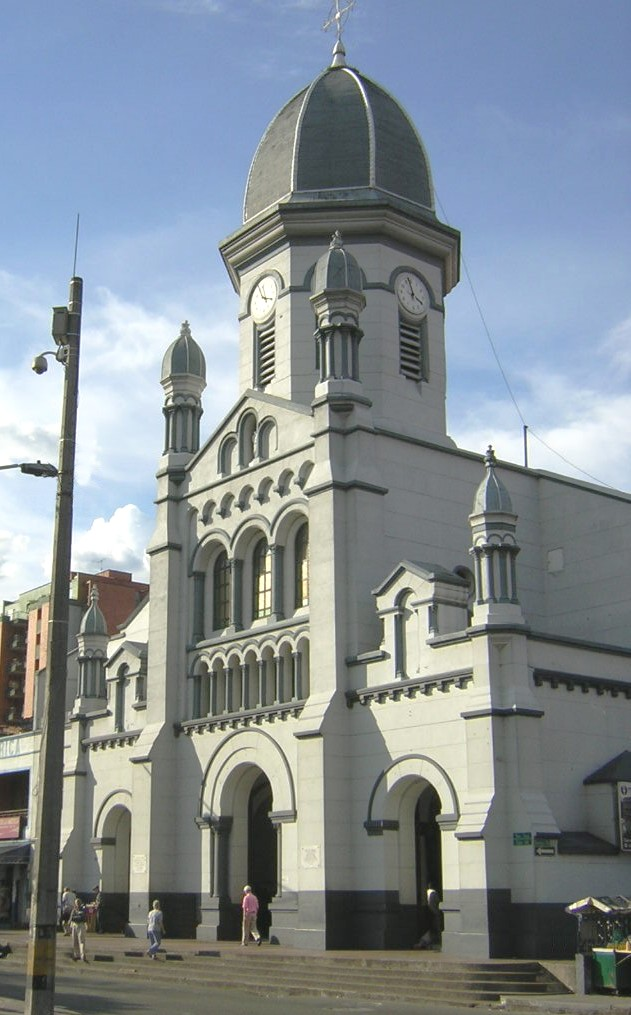
Church of Our Lady of Dolores, Colombia

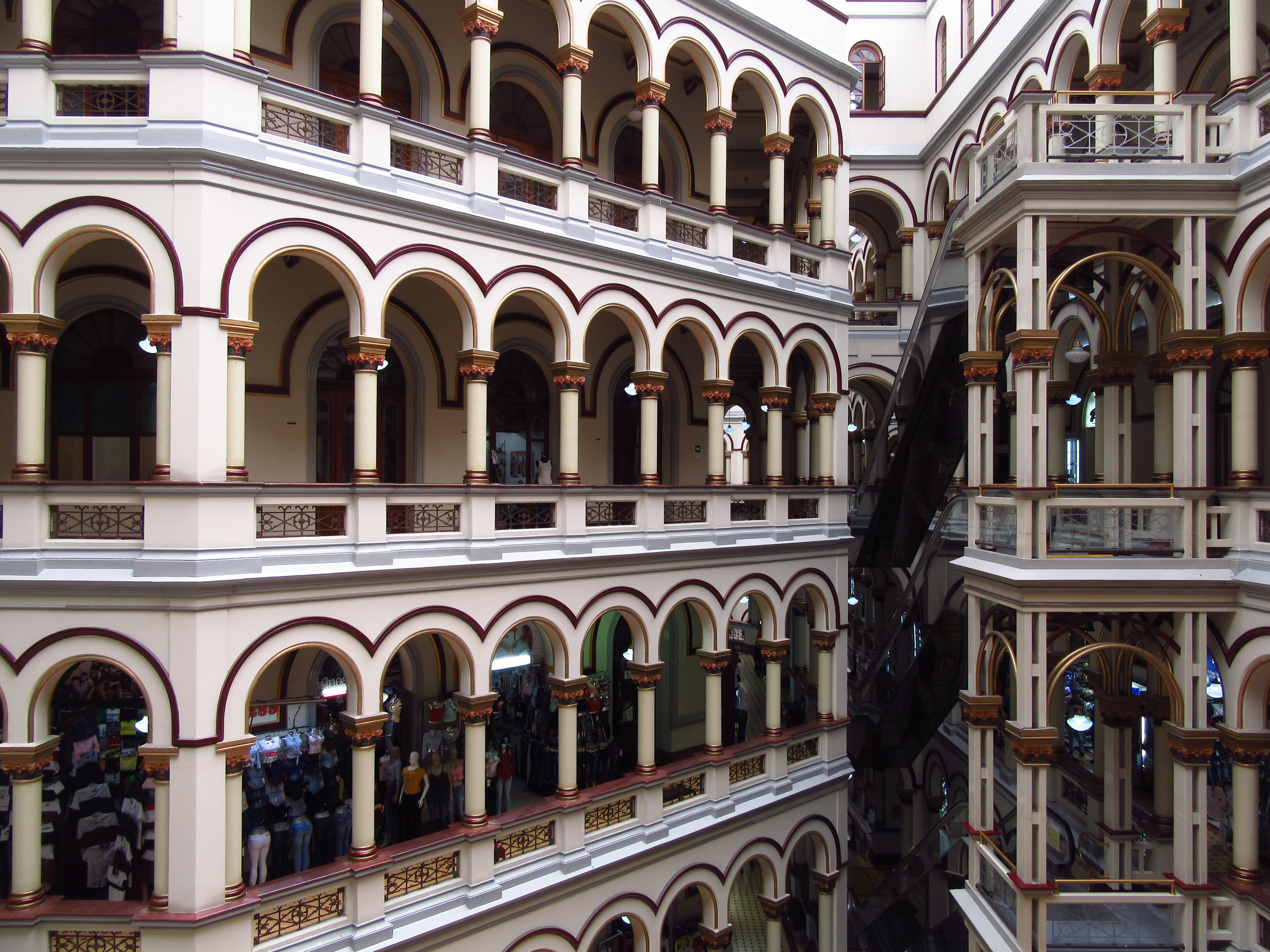
National Palace of Medellín

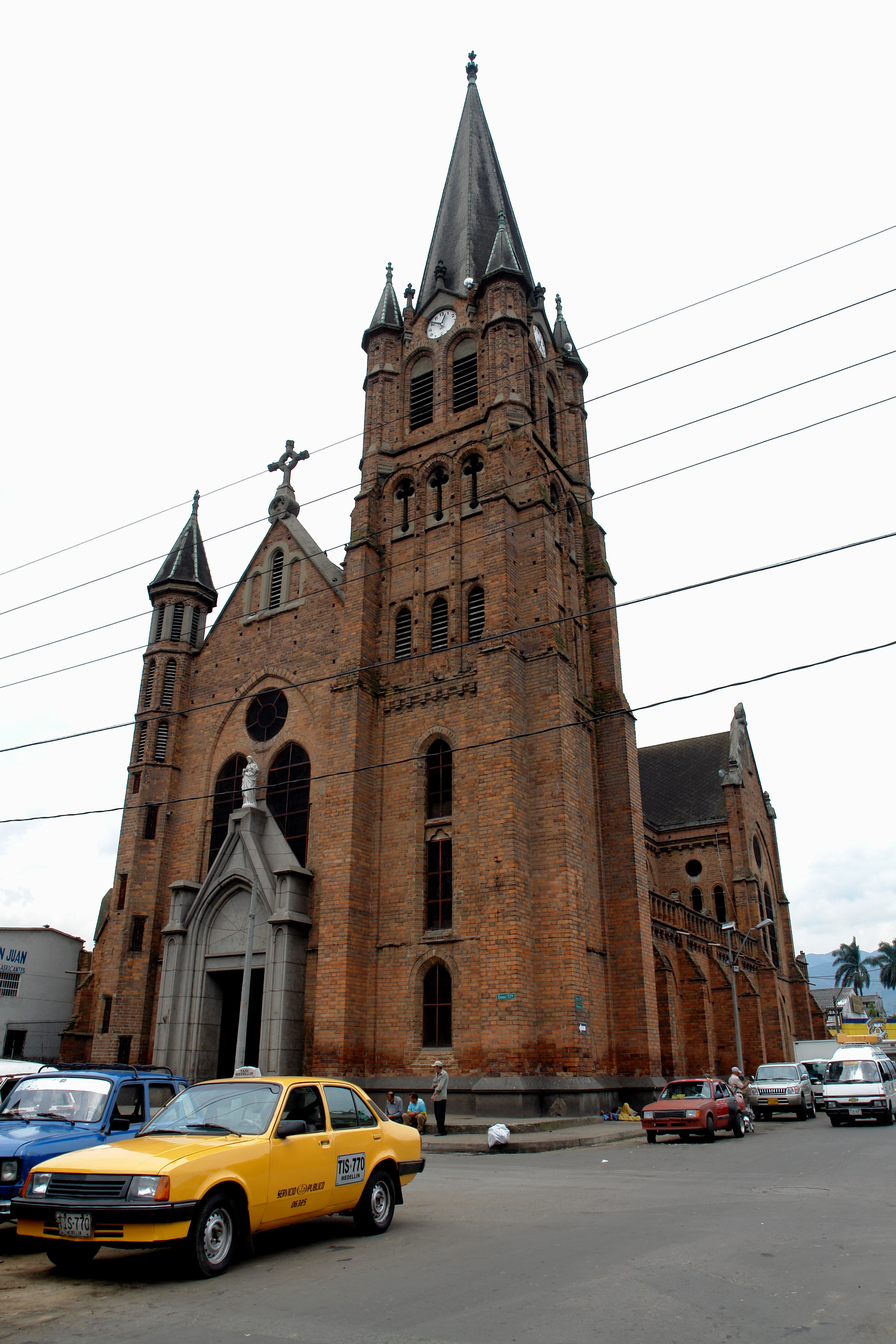
Church of the Sacred Heart of Jesus, Colombia

== Sources ==
- Velez White, Mercedes Lucia (1994). "Agustín Goovaerts y la Arquitectura en Medellín". Editorial el Propio Bolsillo, Medellín.
- Molina Londoño, Luis Fernando (1998). "Agustin Goovaerts y la arquitectura colombiana en los años veintes". El Áncora Editores -Banco de la República de Colombia, Bogotá.
- https://www.the-low-countries.com/article/augustin-goovaerts-a-belgian-palace-builder-in-colombia
