= Edificio Gonzalo Mejía =

Former Art Nouveau hotel and theatre in Medellín, Colombia

Gonzalo Mejía Building
- Edificio Gonzalo Mejía
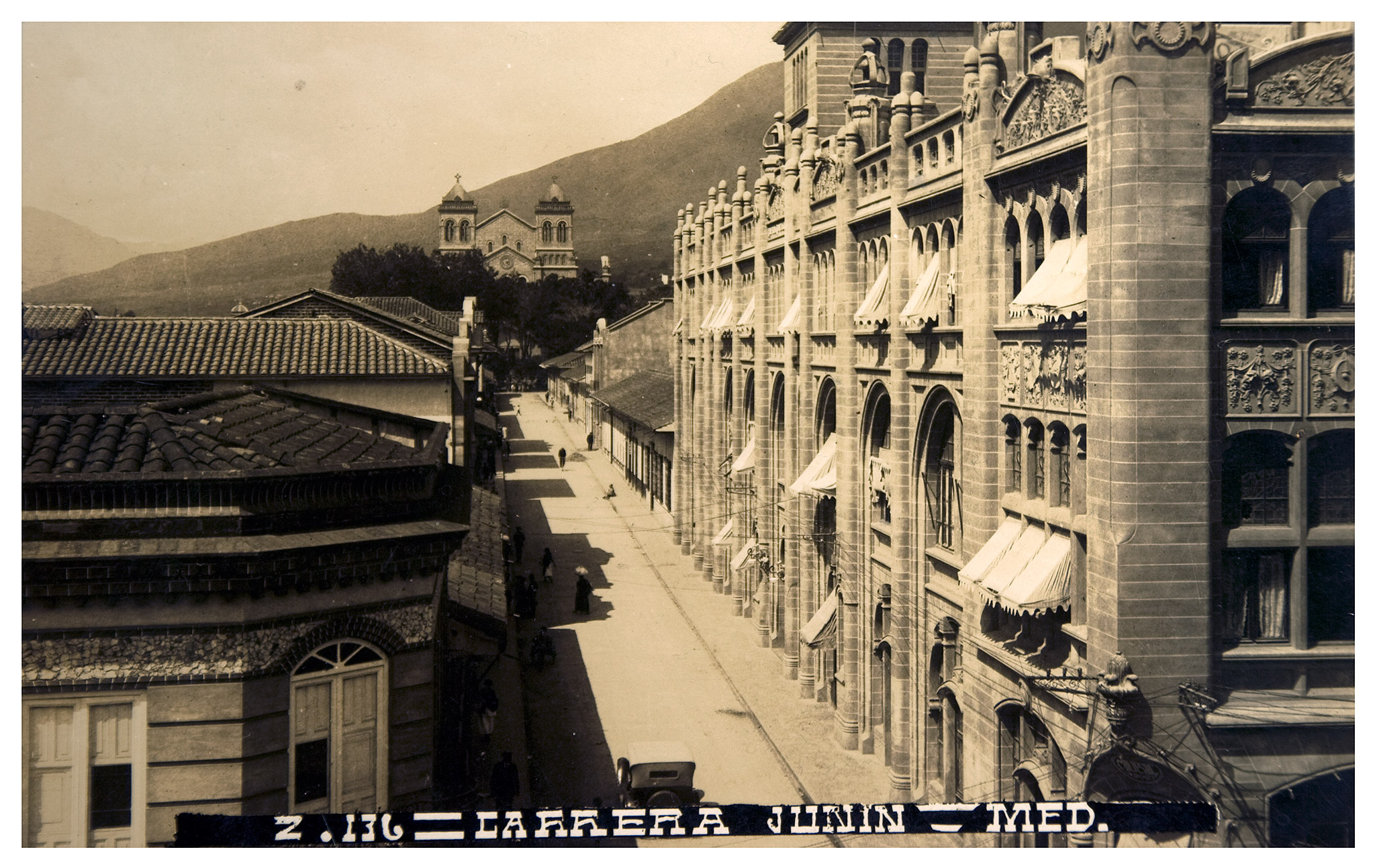
- A view of the Carrera Junín in 1923. The Edificio Gonzalo Mejía is located on the right
- Interactive map of the Gonzalo Mejía Building area

General information
- Type: commercial, hotel, theatre
- Architectural style: Art Nouveau
- Location: Medellín, Colombia
- Groundbreaking: 1922
- Opened: 1924
- Closed: 5 October 1967
- Demolished: 1967-1968

Technical details
- Floor count: 4

Design and construction
- Architect: Agustín Goovaerts

The Edificio Gonzalo Mejía was an Art Nouveau hotel, theatre, and commercial building in Medellín, Colombia standing from 1924 to 1967. Designed by the Belgian architect Agustín Goovaerts in 1922, the building contained the Hotel Europa and a theatre dedicated to showing movies along with other commercial clients. The building has been considered as one of the finest works of architecture built in Colombia during the 1920s. In 1967, the building was demolished and replaced by the Coltejer Building, the tallest in Medellín.

== History ==
Local businessman Gonzalo Mejía developed the building starting in 1922, wanting to bring a luxury hotel and theatre to the town. The building replaced the Casa de los Jaramillo.

The building opened in 1924 on the corner of Junín and La Playa streets, close to other important Medellín meeting places, including the Union Club and the Astor Tea Room. The building's occupants included the Hotel Europa and the Salon Regina, and at opening was considered the finest Art Nouveau building in the region. The Junín Theatre, located in the building, included more than 4,000 seats.

By the 1940s, the opening of the Hotel Nutibara had cut into the Hotel Europa's business, and the theatre showed signs of decline. The Junín theatre closed in October 1967 after a showing of the movie Arizona Colt, with demolition proceeding a week later. In spite of its architectural importance, the building's demolition did not attract any controversy, with the journalist Miguel Zapata Restrepo writing on the eve of its demolition, "the Junín [theatre] has completed its work..."

Due in part to the building's valuable central location, it was replaced by the Coltejer Building, the tallest building in Medellín, in 1972.
