= Teatro Lido =

Theater in Medellín, Colombia

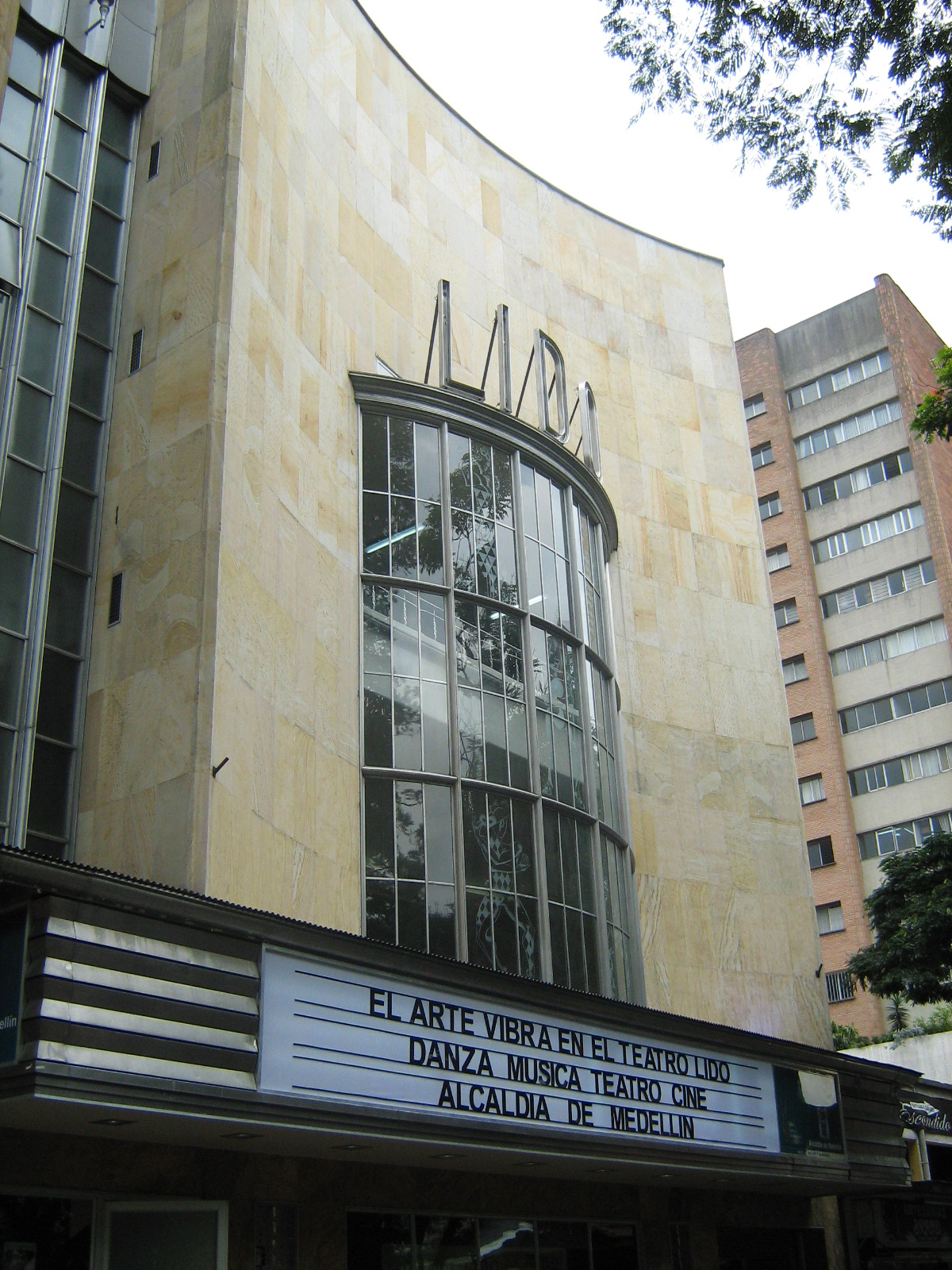
- External view of the theatre.
- Interactive map of Teatro Lido
- Address: Carrera 48 No. 54 - 20; Medellín; Colombia
- Coordinates: 6.252402°N 75.564526°W
- Capacity: 1.100

Construction
- Opened: 1945
- Architect: Federico Vásquez

The Teatro Lido is a Colombian theater located at the southeastern coast of Park of Bolívar, in Medellín. The theater began operating in 1945 and in 2007, after a methodical restoration was reopened, and is administered by the Mayor of Medellin. It has capacity for 1,100 spectators and offers a variety of programming throughout the year.

The site was previously occupied by la Macarena billiard hall.
