= Coltejer Building =

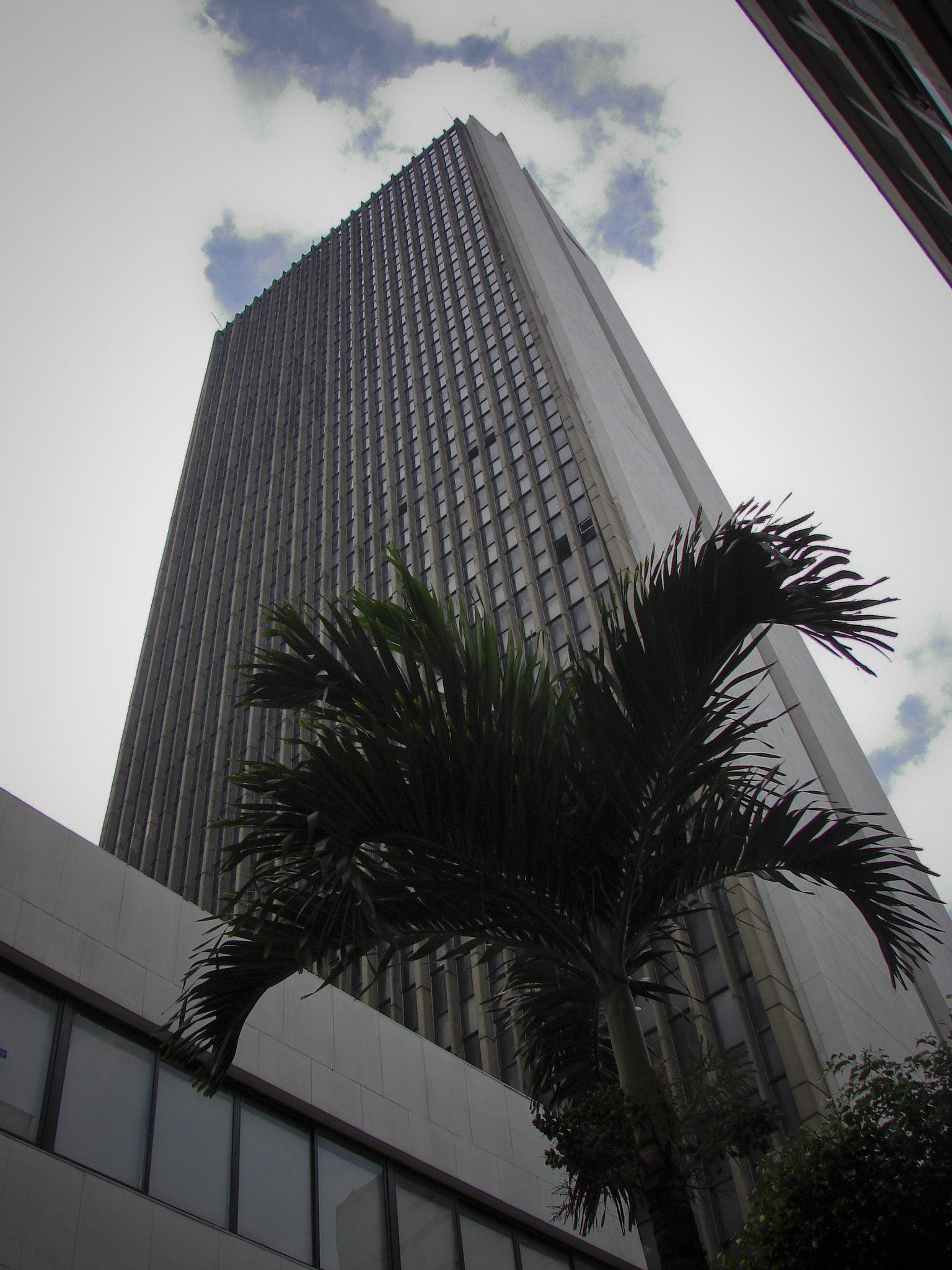
- Interactive map of the Coltejer Building area

General information
- Type: Office
- Location: Medellín, Antioquia, Colombia
- Coordinates: 6°15′00″N 75°33′58″W
- Construction started: 1968
- Completed: 1972
- Owner: Coltejer S. A.

Height
- Roof: 175 m (574 ft)

Technical details
- Floor count: 36
- Floor area: 42,000 m^{2} (450,000 sq ft)
- Lifts/elevators: 11

Design and construction
- Architects: Raúl Fajardo Moreno, Saldarriaga, Samper and Manjarres
- Structural engineer: Jaime Muñoz Duque
- Main contractor: Rafael Pacheco

The Coltejer Building is the tallest building in Medellín, Colombia and the tenth-tallest in Colombia as of 2016. It was completed in 1972. Coltejer is one of the most important textile companies in Colombia, and the largest textile complex in Latin America. It was founded in Medellín by Alejandro Echavarría on October 22, 1907.

== Building history ==
Colombia began a skyscraper building era in the 1960s in Medellín. The Coltejer Building was designed by architects Raúl Fajardo, Aníbal Saldarriaga, Germán Samper, and Jorge Manjarres. Its construction required the demolition of the art nouveau Edificio Gonzalo Mejía which contained the Junín Theatre and the Hotel Europa.

With a height of 175 metres (574 ft), the Coltejer Building was the fourth-tallest building in Colombia, and was the tallest building in South America at the time of its completion. It is said to resemble a sewing machine needle, representing the textile company after which it is named.

=== Statistics ===
- Height: 175 metres
- Area: 42,000 square metres.
- Floors: 36
- Parking spaces: 150
- Elevators: 11

The Coltejer Building can host 40,000 seated people and 168,000 standing people.

== Coltejer ==
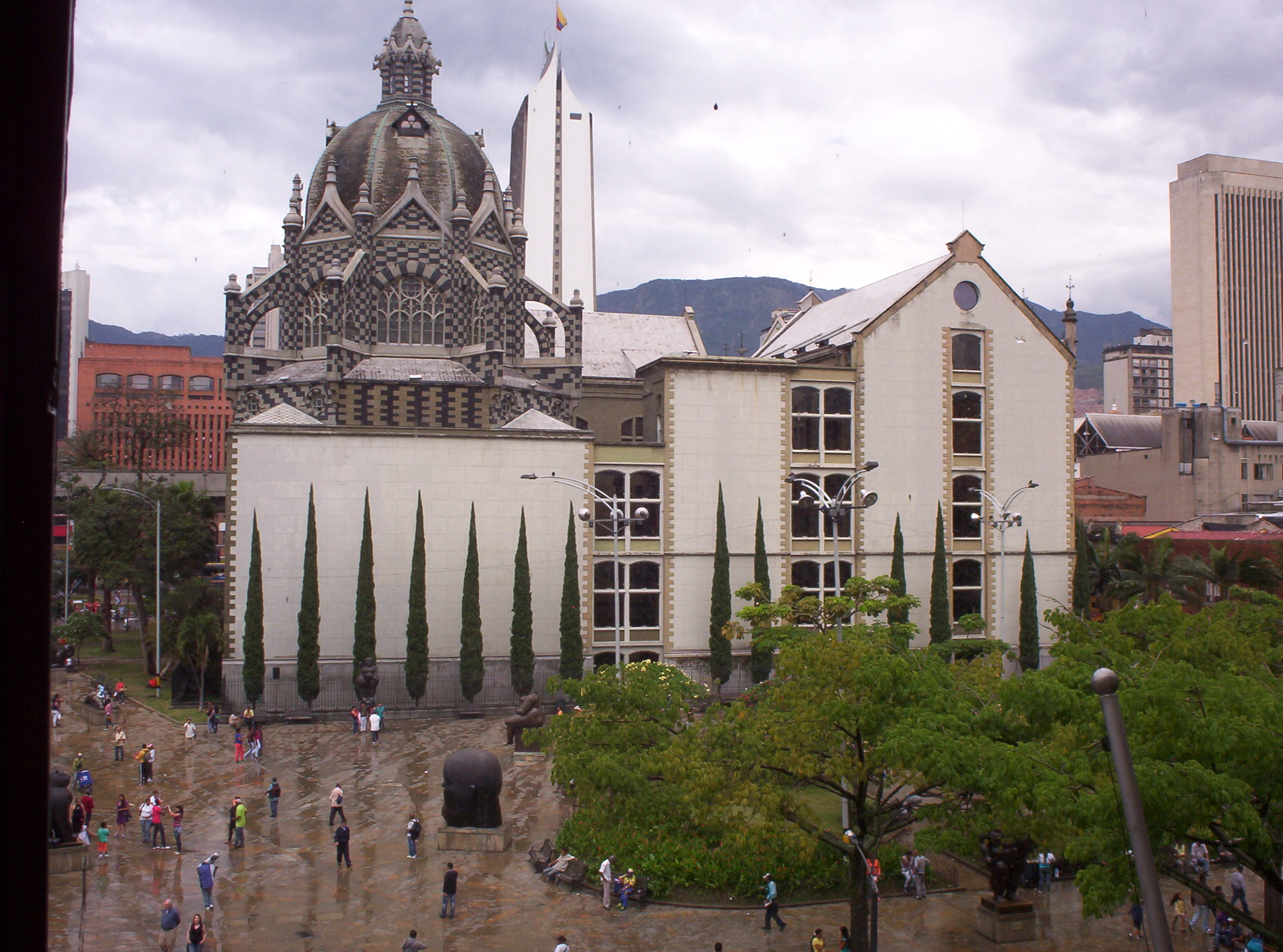
A view of Botero Plaza and the Coltejer building in the background from the Museum of Antioquia

=== History ===
The Echavarría family were the founders of two textile companies, Coltejer and Fabricato, and were also involved in coffee exportation and importation of other goods. In 1907, Alejandro Echavarría decided to import four power looms, which he put to work along with twelve workers in the patio of his coffee-processing plant. This was the beginning of Coltejer.

During the Depression era, Coltejer bought discarded looms cheaply from the United States that were brought in on muleback. During World War II, Coltejer was operating some 70,000 spindles and 1,900 looms, employing 4,000 workers in its Medellin plant in addition to those at Envigado.

=== Production ===
Coltejer's profits increased by a factor of twenty between 1940 and 1949, from 830,000 pesos to 16,520,000.

Coltejer has a total fabric production capacity of about 60 million metres, of which 90% is used to produce clothing and 10% is to make home textiles. It is also one of the leading denim producers in Colombia. Coltejer works with 67 exclusive distributors and 77 wholesalers in Colombia.

== See also ==
- List of tallest buildings in South America
- List of tallest buildings in Colombia
