= Raúl Fajardo Moreno =

Colombian architect

- Born: December 3, 1929
- Died: July 31, 2012 (aged 82)
- Occupation: Architect
- Children: 5, including Sergio Fajardo
- Buildings: Coltejer Building

Raúl Fajardo Moreno (December 3,1929 – July 31, 2012) was a Colombian architect. He designed the Coltejer Building, Medellín's tallest building with Hernando Vélez, Germán Samper and Jorge Manjarrés.

Asked about which of his projects were his favorites he said, "There are many. City University U. of A., Coltejer building, Headquarters of Southamerican Insurance, and many others. But I would change every one if I was going to create them today."

== Personal life ==
He married María Valderrama Tobón and had five children together. Their son Sergio Fajardo was the Mayor of Medellín and then later the Governor of Antioquia. Their other children were María Isabel, Andrés, Rodrigo and Silvia.

He died at the end of July, 2012.

== Works ==
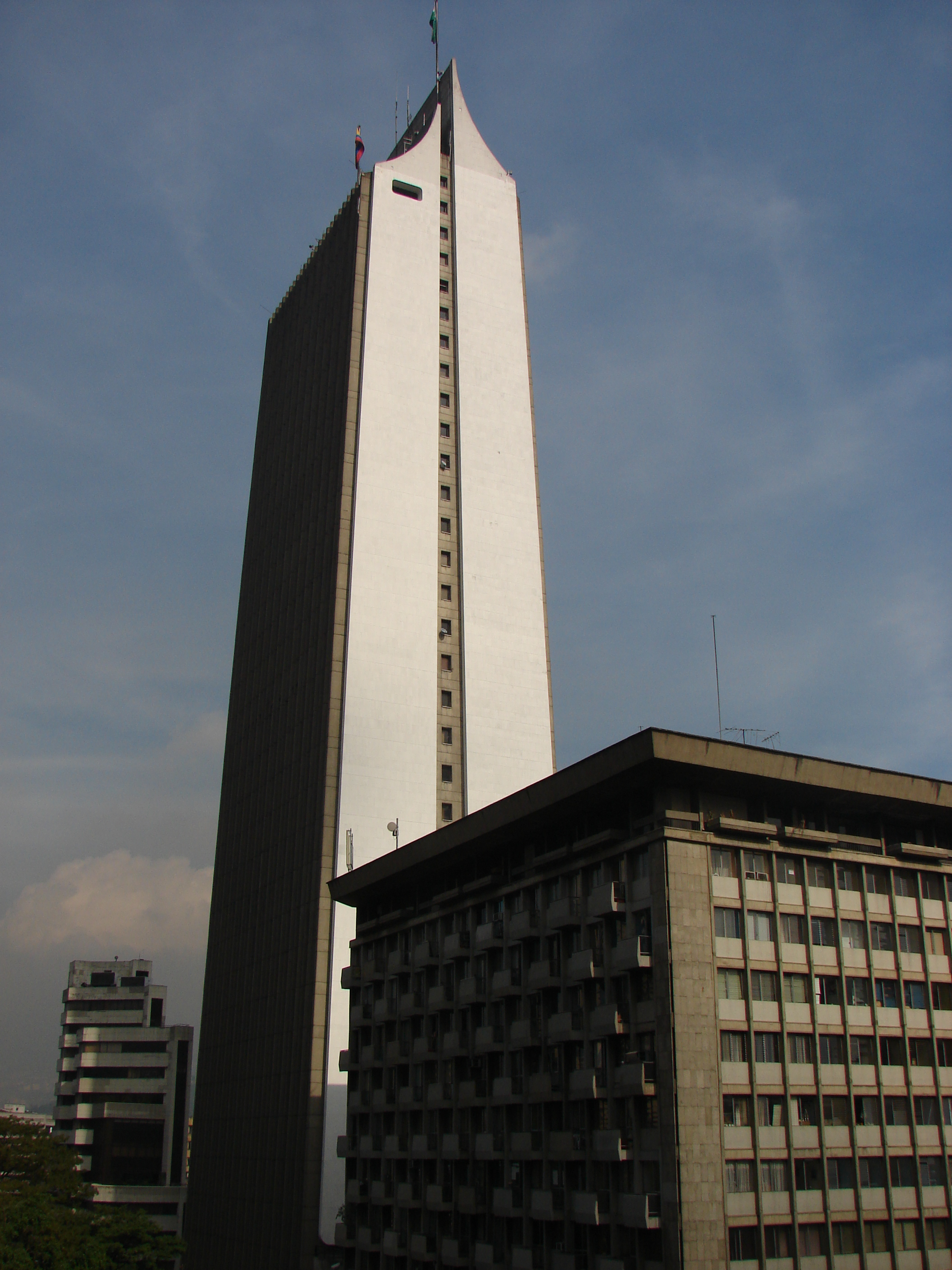
The Coltejer Building was designed by Moreno.

- Coltejer Building
- Citadel at the University of Antioquia
- SouthAmerican Insurance headquarters
- Coltabaco
- Banco Cafetero building (Coffee Bank building)
- Vicente Uribe Rendón building
- Corficolombiana Headquarters
- Colegio San Ignacio, Medellin
- the Inem in Medellín
- Lyceum at the University of Antioquia
- Premium Plaza
- City Plaza, his most recent work
