= Bolívar Park (Medellín, Colombia) =

Park in Medellín

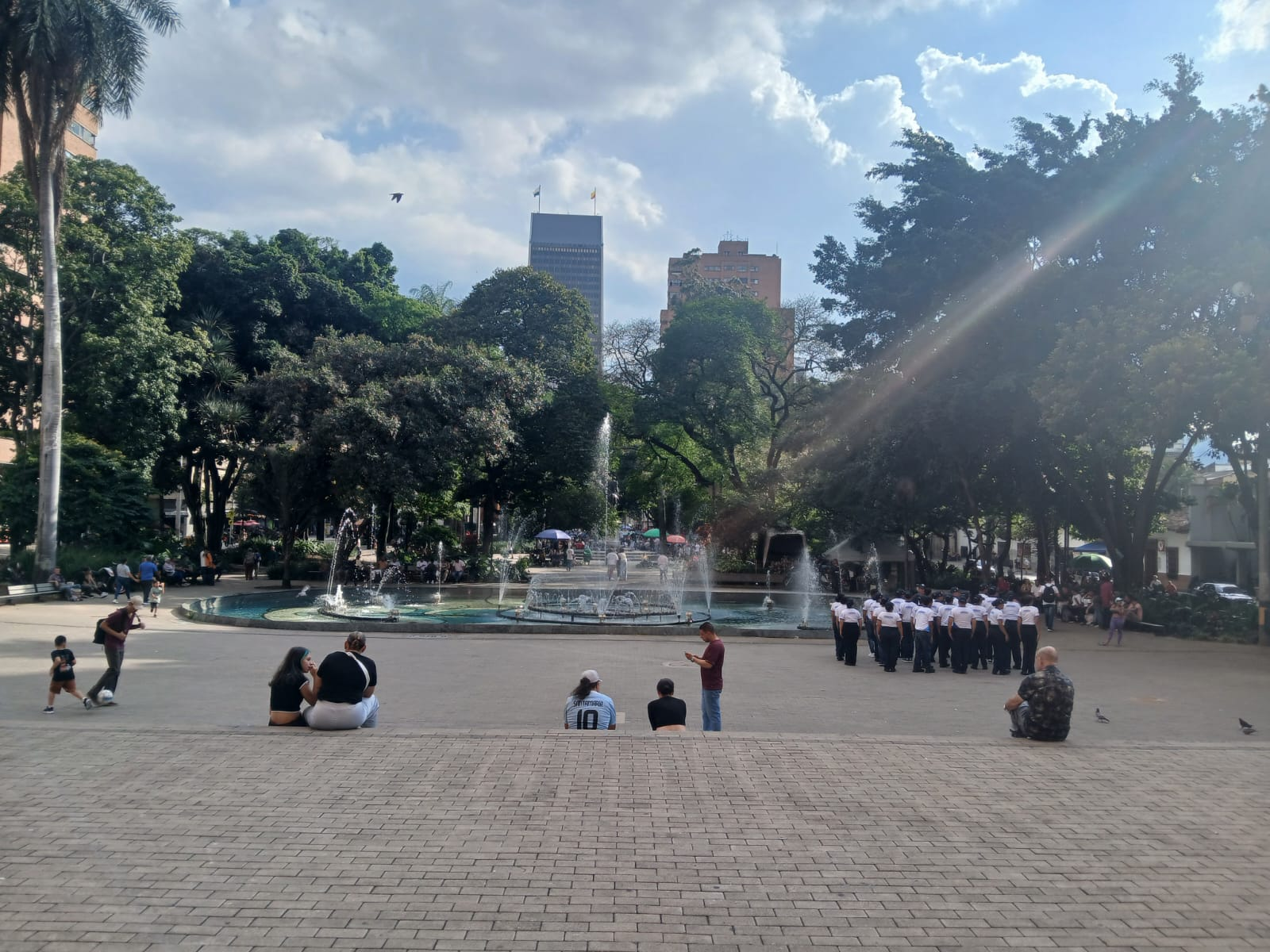
- The park from the north side.
- Interactive map of Bolívar Park
- Location: Villanueva, Medellín
- Coordinates: 6°15′14.01″N 75°33′50.35″W
- Area: 14,400 m^{2}
- Created: 1892
- Operator: Municipio de Medellín
- Status: Public, open all year

The Park of Bolívar (Parque de Bolívar) or Bolívar Park (Parque Bolívar), as it is popularly known, is an urban park in Medellín, Antioquia, Colombia. The park was inaugurated in 1892 and named in honor of the liberator Simón Bolívar. In 1923, an equestrian statue was erected in the center of the park, designed by the Italian sculptor Giovanni Anderlini and cast by the Italian sculptor Eugenio Maccagnani.

The park occupies two blocks, with approximately 14,400 m^{2} in area divided between green and paved areas. Its varied landscaping includes native trees. This urban space, replete with historical and cultural symbolism, is considered a symbol of the city itself. It is the main meeting place used by the city's different generations. Around the park are located several cultural sites of the city: on the north side is the Metropolitan Cathedral of Medellín, and at the southeastern coast is the Lido Theater. Also worthy of appreciation are nearby old houses, in the former luxury residential sector of the city center. On the first three Sundays of each month at 11:15 a.m. the Banda Sinfónica Universidad de Antioquia holds their traditional Sunday open-air concert. On the first Saturday of each month, the park hosts the traditional San Alejo market.

== Urban and social context ==
Location of the Berrío and Bolívar parks. The light gray line is the metro; the red zone is the cathedral, the green zones are the parks, and the orange is the Basilica of Our Lady of Candelaria.

The Bolívar Park is located in the neighborhood of Villanueva, in the downtown area of Medellín. Many avenues converge near the ends of the park that are named after places and events related to Simon Bolivar: such as the calles Perú and Bolivia, and the carreras Venezuela and Ecuador, nations liberated by Bolívar. Two other streets are Caracas and La Paz, the latter passes behind the cathedral. Along the Junín carrera, which ends on the south side of the park, can be found one of the more traditional shopping towns. Its name commemorates the Battle of Junín.

The nearby streets have mixed usage as housing, business, trade and service industries. Traditionally, the park has been a place for meetings and cultural events, such as the Retreta Dominical o del Parque (Sundays open-air concert), a tradition for more than 100 years, which is held by the Banda Sinfónica Universidad de Antioquia on the first three Sundays of the month at 11 a.m. Also, there is the Crafts Fair of San Alejo, which takes place on the first Saturday of each month. Moreover, the park often has storytelling, street theatre and other events.

Due to social programs, and police presence, the area has been recovering from security issues. Nowadays, the park is visited by both locals and tourists, with both the cathedral and the statue of Bolívar as the principal meeting places. There are 15 buildings listed as Architectural heritage of Medellín, including Lido Theater, restored in 2007.

== Characteristics ==
The park is rectangular; it is 165 meters long and 63 meters wide. It is approximately 10,395 m² in area. The park contains many trees and green areas. There is also many street furniture, such as banks, ATMs, payphones, benches, waste containers, sculptures, and fountains.

Today it seems that the park has a disorganized structure; in some places the corridor is wide but in others it is narrow. This is due to the green zone at the time the park was built. Now some trees look incorrectly placed; some are in the middle of the corridor, and some are right next to the street.

Parallel to the calle 54 (Caracas) is where shoeshiners are located. To the side of the calle 49 (Venezuela) is the police station, and to the other side, the calle 48 (Ecuador) are the public restrooms.

== Park Sculptures ==
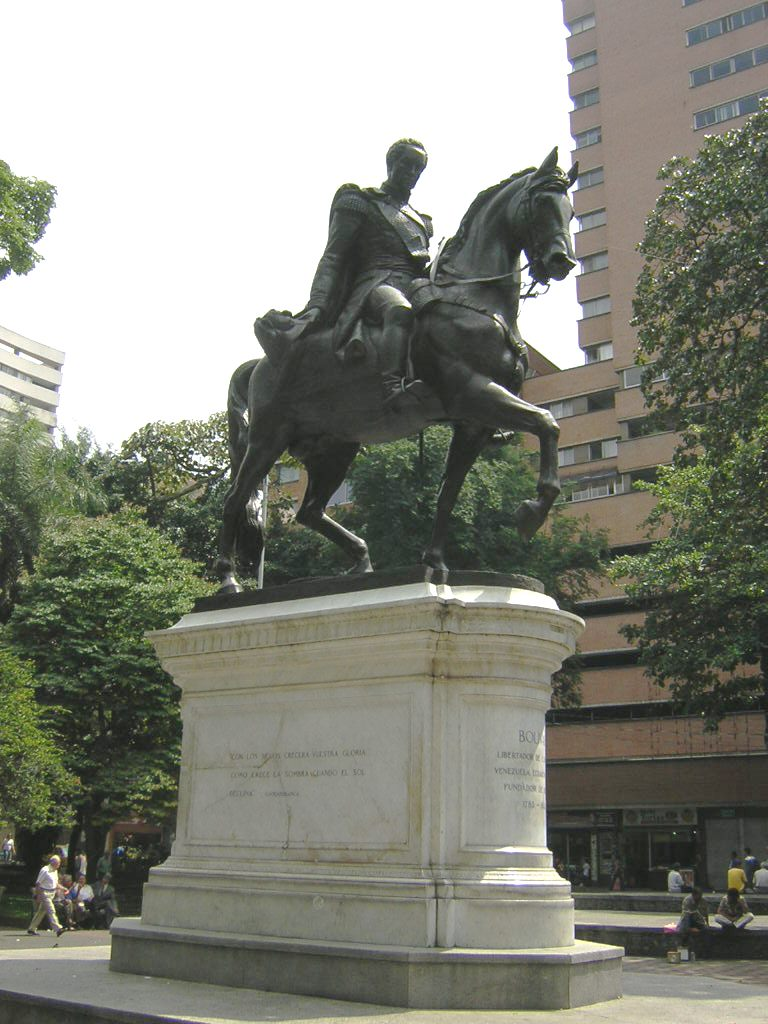
The Bolivar statue with the marble base around it.

=== Bolivar Statue ===
The statue was placed in 1919. It shows Simon Bolivar on a horse. The design was realized by the Italian sculptor Giovanni Anderlini. The statue's final cost was 14 million pesos.

The statue was delivered from Genoa to Medellín, first by ship and then by train.

==== The Pedestal ====
The pedestal is made up of white marble, designed by Belgian architect Agustín Goovaerts. Its measurements are 3.40 m from the base, 2.20 m in height and 1.40 m in width. It is mostly rectangular but the sides are round. Messages are engraved on the walls of its four sides that were selected by Cadavid Restrepo. The marble pedestal was located on a rock and brick platform of approximately 1.50 m in height. There was a discussion when the statue was being placed on where its orientation would be, and the decision was that it would face south.

==== The Inauguration ====
On 6 August 1923, President Pedro Nel Ospina Vázquez, former governor of Antioquia and construction leader of the statue, arrived at the park to inaugurate the statue. The next day, the statue was officially inaugurated with a document signed by President Pedro Nel Ospina, Antioquia Governor Ricardo Jiménez Jaramillo, and Mayor of Medellin Nicanor Restrepo Giraldo.

=== Bust of Fidel Cano Gutierrez ===
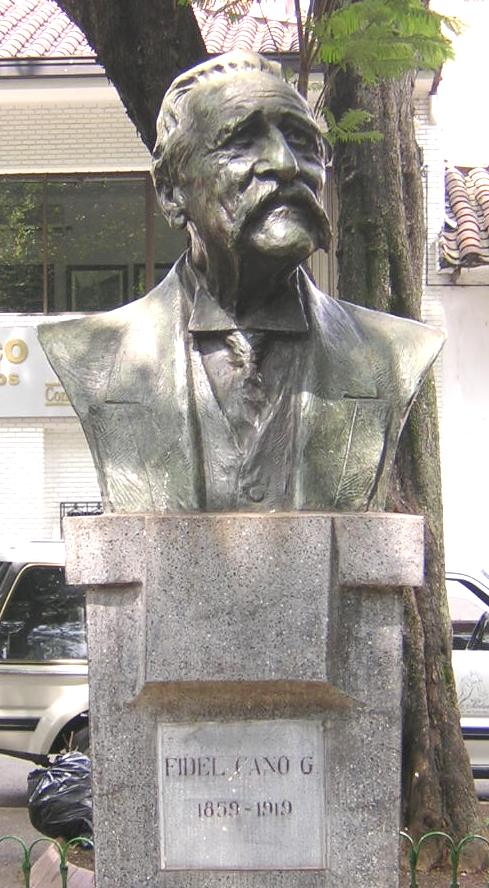
Bust of Fidel Cano

In 1925 the bust of Fidel Cano Gutiérrez was installed and inaugurated at the Park. The bust was designed by Francisco Antonio Cano Cardona.

=== Bust of Guillermo Cano Isaza ===
The bust was a work created by sculptor Rodrigo Arenas Betancourt, in homage to the former director of El Espectador Guillermo Cano Isaza, killed by the Medellín Cartel in 1986. It is located in front of the Lido Theater. The bust was inaugurated on 3 May 2007 by former mayor Sergio Fajardo, accompanied by Japanese general director of UNESCO Kōichirō Matsuura, governor of Antioquia Aníbal Gaviria, and members of the Cano family.

Months after Isaza's death in 1986, a bust was placed in the park remembering him. However, a few weeks after it was placed, it was damaged and violated by members of the cartel.

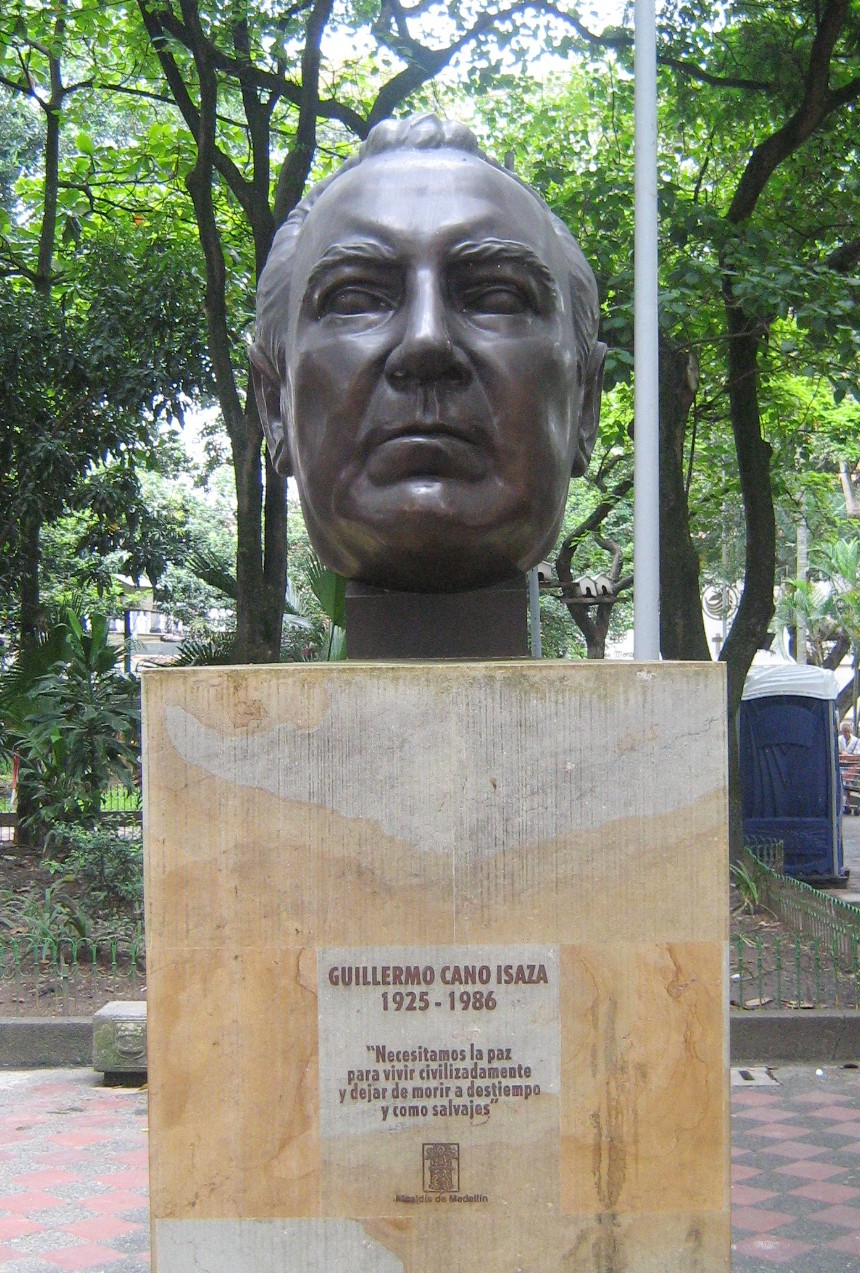
Bust of Guillermo Cano Isaza

=== Plaque of James Tyrrell ===
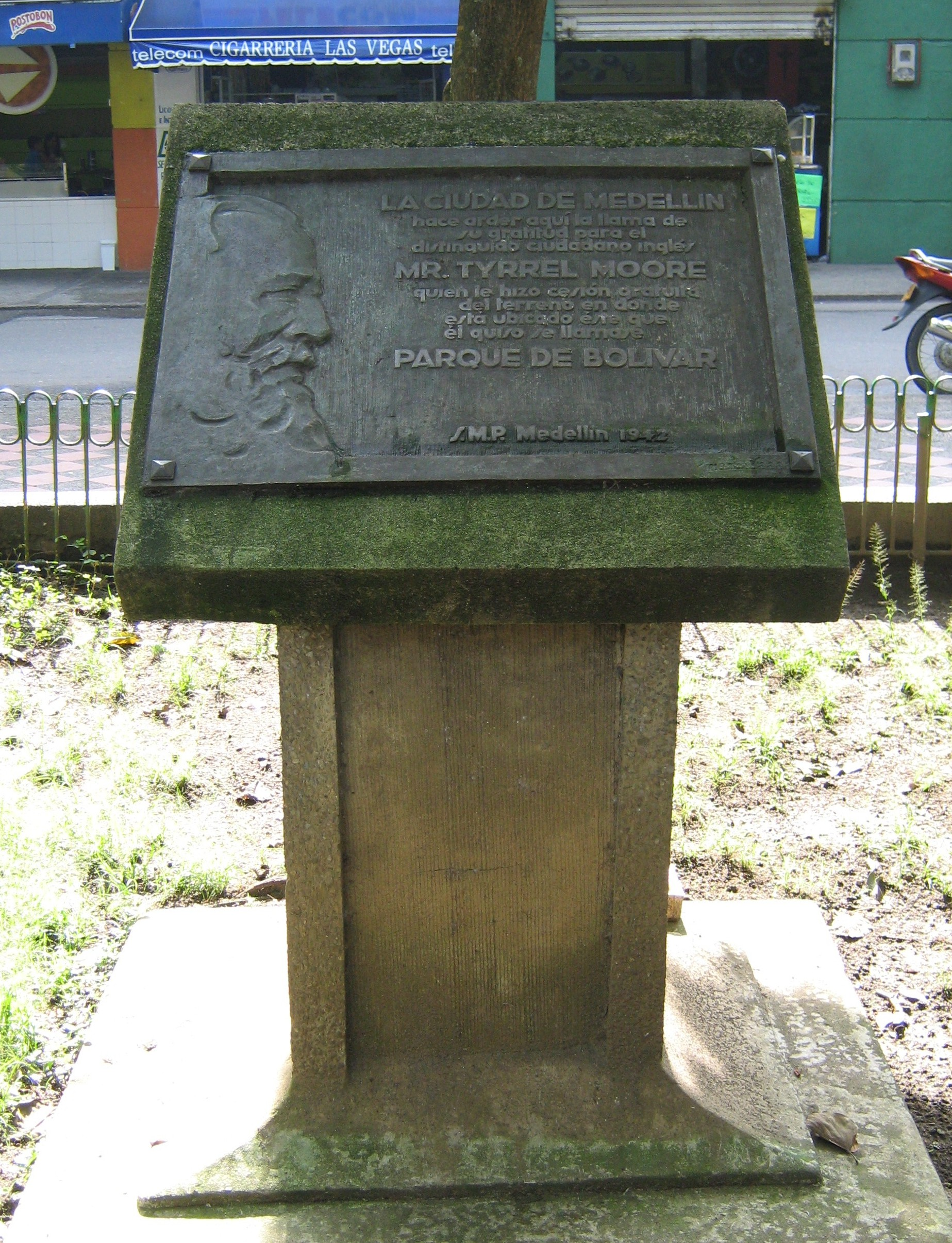
James Moore plaque

The bronze plaque of James Tyrrell Moore was designed by Jorge Marín Vieco. It has a rectangular shape, has the face of Moore on the left side, and on the right side a short message of appreciation. The plaque is located next to the calle 48 (Ecuador) in the middle almost parallel to the Bolivar Statue. It was inaugurated on 29 November 1942.
