= Berrío Park =

Park in Medellín, Colombia

- Parque de Berrío, Parque Berrío
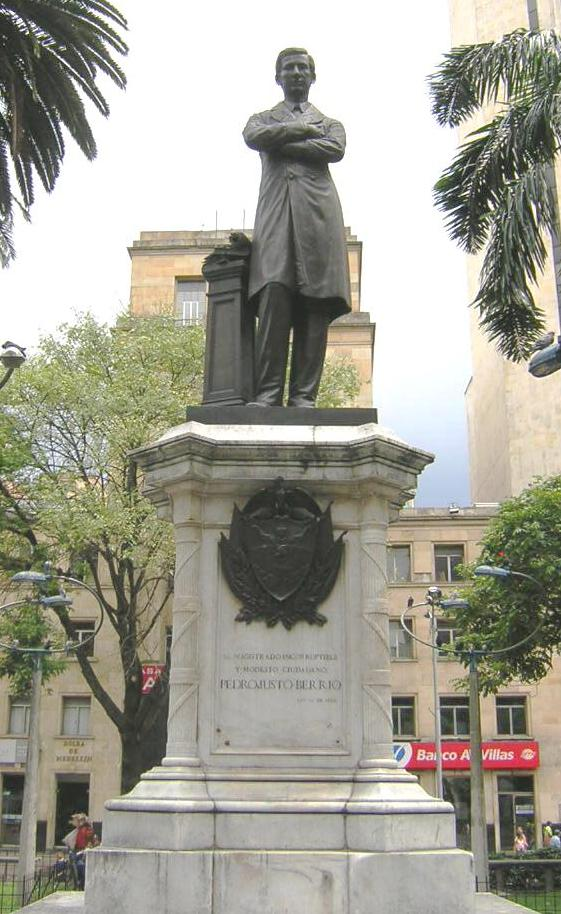
- Interactive map of Berrío Park
- Location: La Candelaria, Medellín, Colombia
- Coordinates: 6°14′59″N 75°34′5″W
- Open: 1646
- Status: Public, open year round

Berrío Park is an urban plaza located in the geographical heart of Medellín, Colombia. It is popular as a meeting place for local residents and as the main reference of the city for visitors, as there are several attractions nearby. The park is named after Pedro Justo Berrío, who was a conservative politician and governor of Antioquia.

Line A on the Medellín Metro has a stop for Berrío Park.

== History ==
The history of this park is closely linked with the Basilica of Our Lady of Candelaria, which was initially built in 1649. The Main Square, as it was called at first, was where parishioners gathered together before and after the Eucharist.

Between 1784 and 1892, the plaza was mostly a public market, and this site was also the scene of many executions and large political announcements. On 23 October 1850, the emancipation of slaves was celebrated when 133 of them were given letters of freedom. As in all major cities of Spanish influence, the most affluent families lived around this square. On 29 June 1895, the statue of Pedro Justo Berrio (one of the leading political figures in the region in the nineteenth century) was inaugurated, and since then the square was changed to the name Berrío Park.

Before becoming the quintessential financial district of the city, Berrío Park suffered from several fires throughout the years. As a result, several buildings were demolished in the 60s and 70s and rebuilt with new materials and in a modern style that differed from its previous colonial architecture. Another large remodeling occurred in the late 1980s and early 1990s, when the area was redesigned in order to accommodate the new Medellín metro station.

== Statue of Pedro Justo Berrío ==
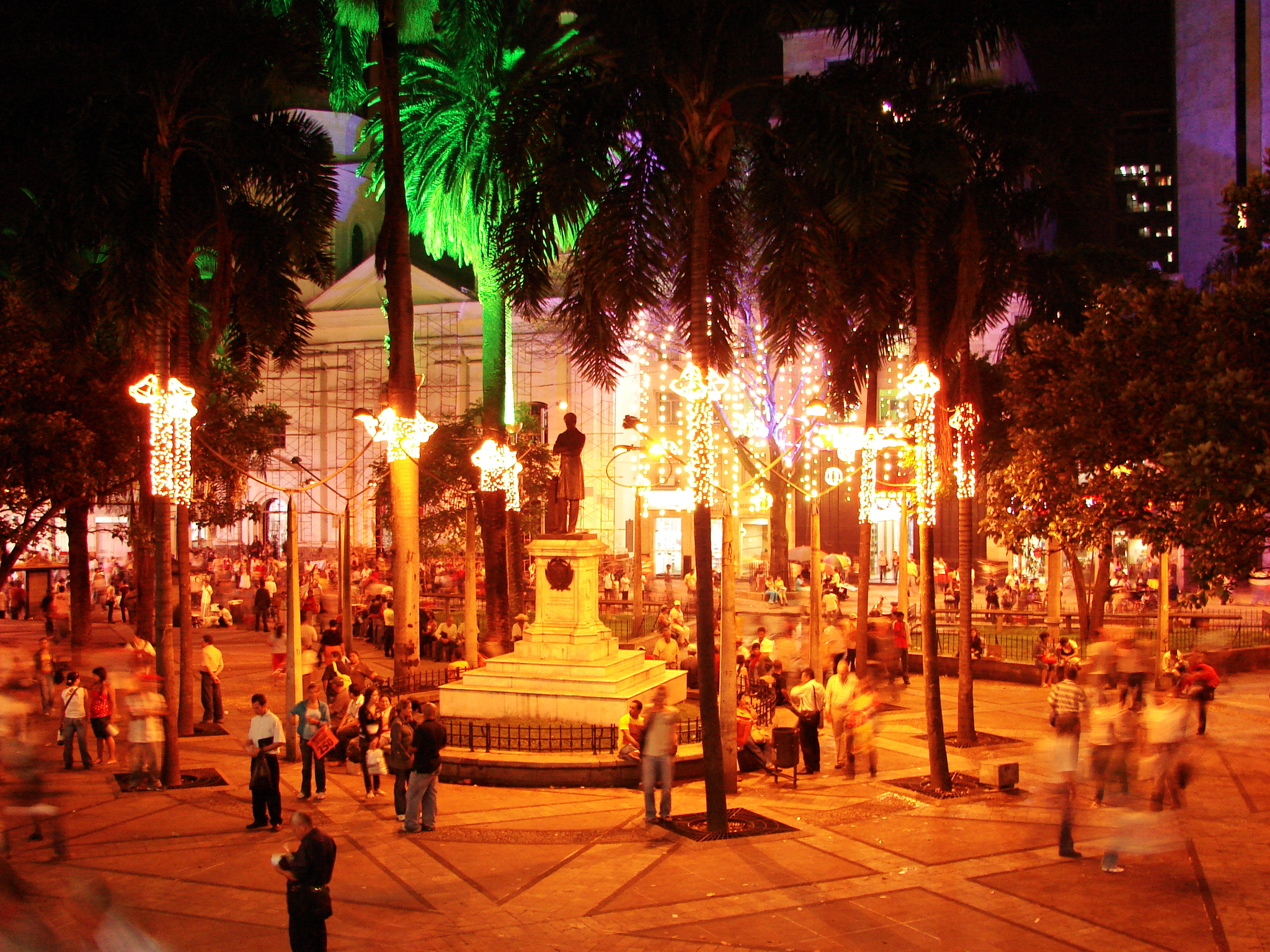
Berrío Park illuminated at night.

In the center stands the statue of Pedro Justo Berrío, which rests on a pedestal of Carrara marble. The statue was officially requested by the Governor of Antioquia under Ordinance 26 on 24 August 1980. It was sculpted in Rome by Italian artist Giovanni Anderlini, who worked from three photographs of Berrío. The statue was promised to be the same size as a similar statue of Simón Bolívar, which Tenerani sculpted for Bogotá.

Below the statue are the symbols of a shield, cane, and sword, and the inscription: "The incorruptible and modest citizen / Dr. Don Pedro Justo Berrío / (Law 155 of 1888)". Other sides of his pedestal display the dates of his birth and death.

Where the statue is currently located, there was a stone basin from 1789 until 1853, when it was replaced by the city's first metal water fountain. The fountain was moved to the José Félix de Restrepo plaza when the Berrío statue was brought in.

== Description ==
"The Challenge" sculpture, by Rodrigo Arenas Betancourt is located in the south-east corner of the square . This statue is made of bronze and concrete and is 18 meters high. It was donated by Banco Popular in 1981.

In the south-west corner the "Female Torso", a bronze sculpture by Fernando Botero, can be seen, which the locals nicknamed La Gorda. La Gorda, gifted in 1987, was the first large bronze sculpture donated by the artist to Colombia. The statue is 3.3 meters high and 2.4 meters wide. It is located in front of the Bank of the Republic.

Across the park are two murals depicting Antioquia's history, created in 1956 by Colombian Pedro Nel Gómez.

== See also ==
- Bolívar Park
- Medellín
