= Basilica of Our Lady of Candelaria =

National monument of Colombia

Coordinates: 6°14′59″N 75°34′2″W

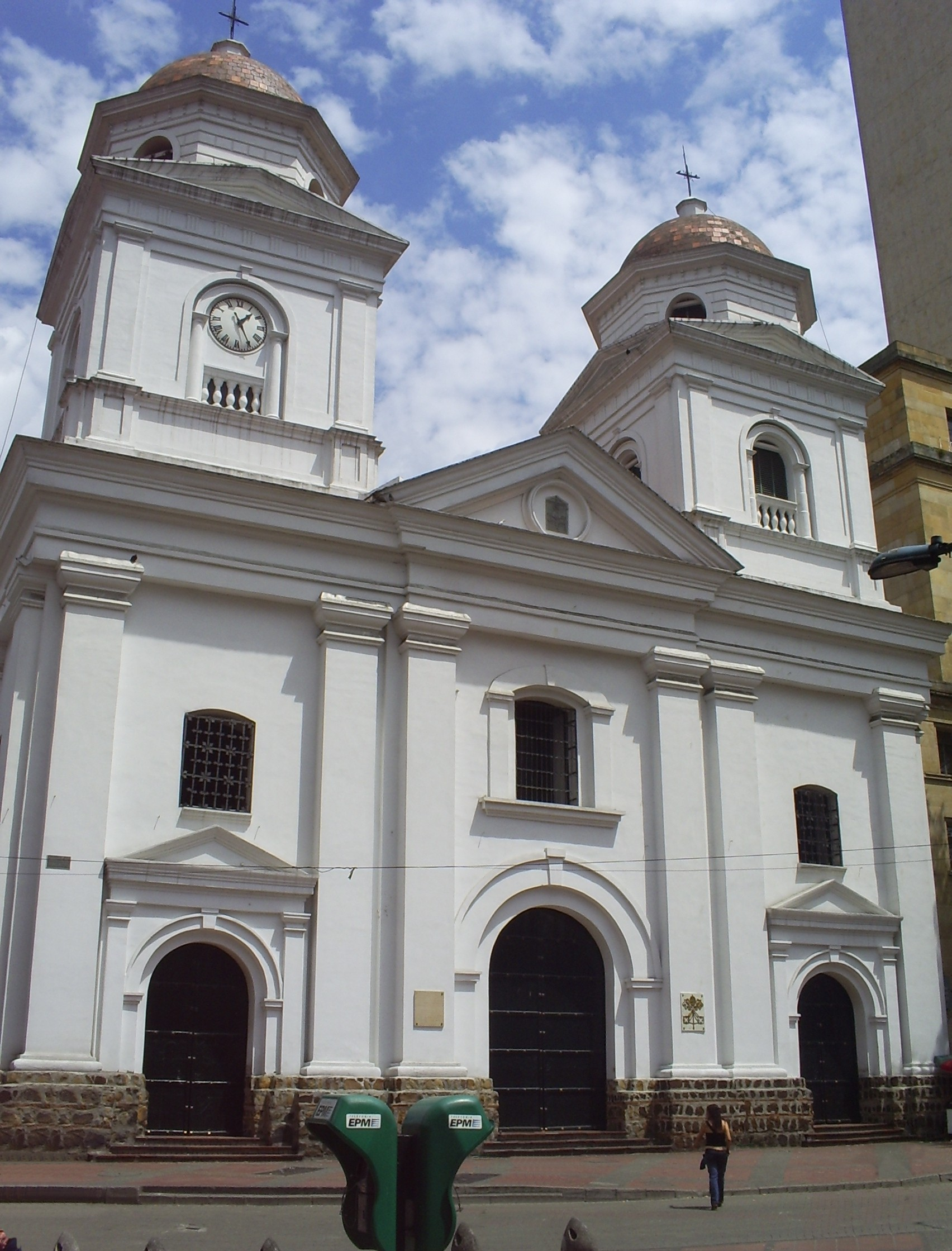
- Front entrance

Religion
- Affiliation: Roman Catholic Church

Location
- Location: 50th and 51st street, La Candelaria, Medellín, Colombia
- Interactive map of Basilica of Our Lady of Candelaria

Architecture
- Type: Church
- Style: Neoclassical

The Basilica of Our Lady of Candelaria or simply La Candelaria Church, as it is more popularly known, is a Roman Catholic church dedicated to the Virgin Mary under the title of Virgin of Candelaria. It is located in the center of the city of Medellín, Colombia, on the eastern side of Berrío Park. It is famous for being the oldest church in the city.

It was the church of the Archdiocese of Medellín from 1868 to 1931, when this title passed to the Cathedral Basilica of the Immaculate Conception. It is a colonial building with a Neoclassical style. Its original structure built in stone and mortar has been patched over throughout its history with unrelated materials.

On December 8, 1970, Pope Paul VI granted it the title of Minor basilica. Renovations occurred during 1997 and on July 31, 1998, by resolution 0795, the building was declared a National monument of Colombia.

== History ==
In 1616, the colonial visitor Francisco de Herrera y Campuzano founded a settlement with 80 Amerindians, naming it Poblado de San Lorenzo, today El Poblado Square. In 1646 a colonial law ordered the separation of Amerindians from mestizos and mulattos, so the colonial administration began the construction of a new town in Aná, today Berrío Park, where the church of Nuestra Señora de la Candelaria de Aná ('Our Lady of Candelaria of Aná') was built. Three years later, the Spaniards started the construction of the Basilica of Our Lady of Candelaria, which was rebuilt at the end of the 18th century. It was dedicated to Our Lady of Candelaria, an invocation of special devotion to the Spanish and particularly for the sailors who crossed the Atlantic to the New World.

== Interior ==
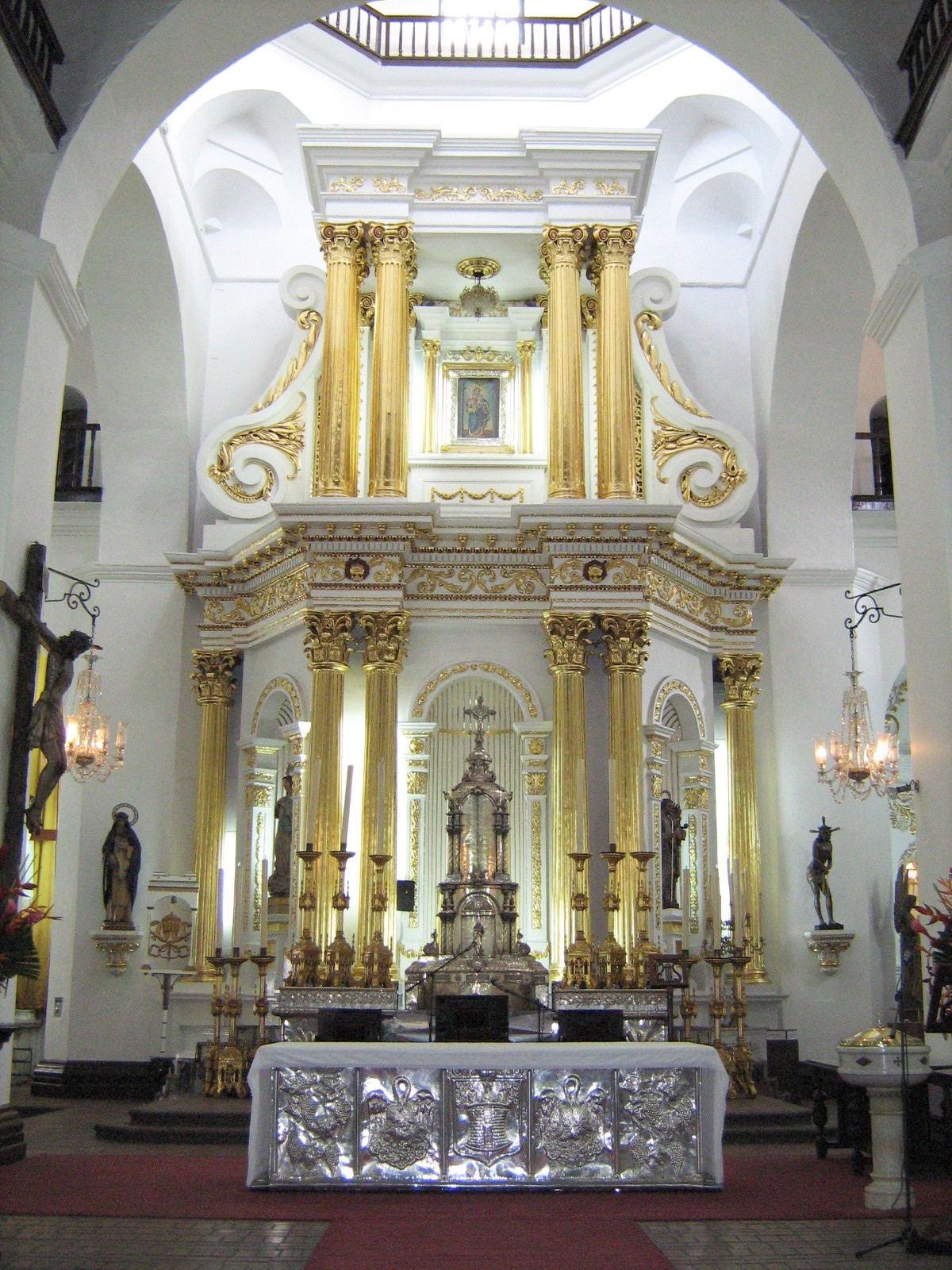
The main altar

The main altar is made of gold-painted wood. A painting of the Virgin of Candelaria, the town's patron saint, is displayed above the altar.

== See also ==
- Candelária Church (Rio de Janeiro, Brazil)
- Basilica of Candelaria (Tenerife, Spain)
