= National monuments of Colombia =

Cultural heritage sites

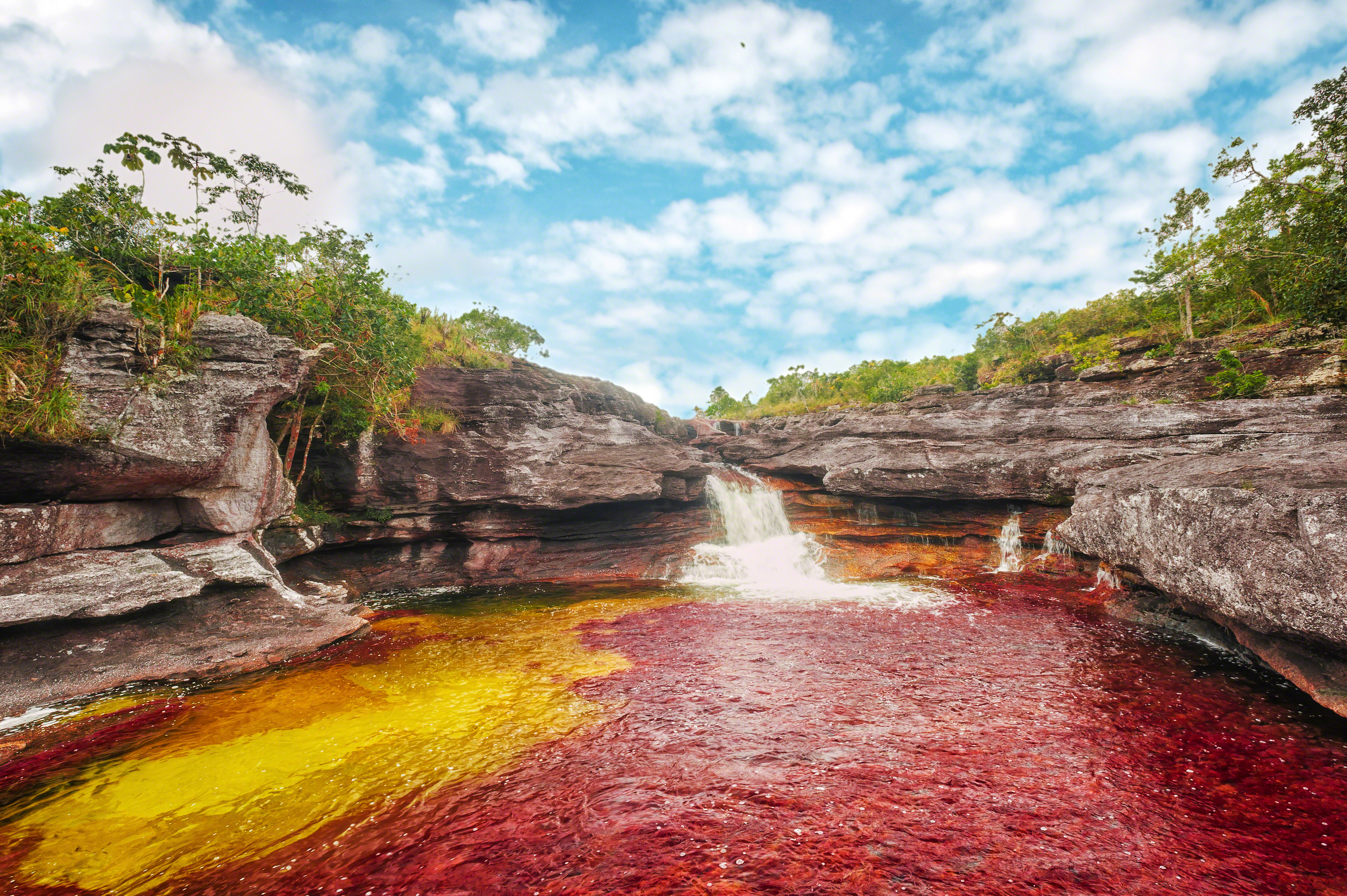
In 1959, Caño Cristales in Serranía de la Macarena was named the first National Monument of Colombia.

The National Monuments of Colombia (Spanish: Monumentos Nacionales de Colombia) are the set of properties, nature reserves, archaeological sites, historic districts, urban areas and property that, for values of authenticity, originality, aesthetics, and artistic techniques, are representative of Colombia and constitute core elements of its history and culture. The cultural heritage of Colombia includes material and immaterial assets "which are an expression of the Colombian nationality", in accordance with Law No. 1185 (2008). As of December 2011, 1079 National Monuments have been declared. A further sixteen candidate sites have been identified for future declaration.

The regulation, management, and safeguarding of the tangible and intangible cultural heritage of the nation is under the control of the Ministry of Culture through the National Heritage Council.

The National Monuments of Colombia list contains 8 monuments that have also been declared UNESCO World Heritage Sites, including the following:

- Coffee Cultural Landscape of Colombia
- Historic Center of Santa Cruz de Mompox
- National Archaeological Park of Tierradentro
- Port, Fortresses and Group of Monuments in Cartagena
- Gold Museum
- Andean Road System
- San Agustín Archaeological Park
- Los Katíos National Park
- Malpelo Fauna and Flora Sanctuary

For the complete list of national monuments, see List of National Monuments of Colombia.

== See also ==
- History of Colombia
- Culture of Colombia
- List of heritage registers
