= SITVA =

Public transportation system

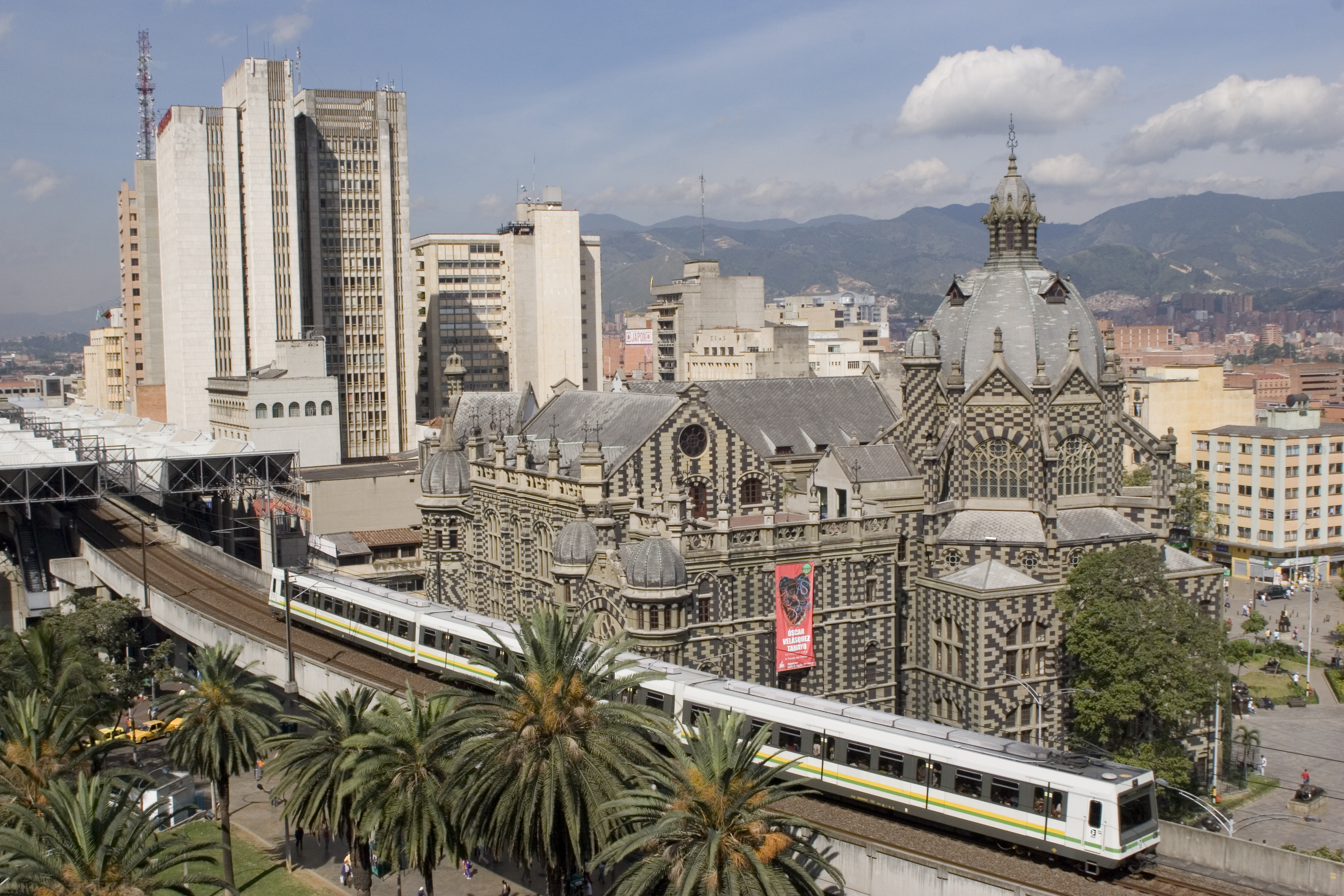
- Train near Berrío Park station

Overview
- Owner: Department of Antioquia, Medellín City
- Area served: Aburrá Valley
- Locale: Medellín Metropolitan Area, Antioquia, Colombia
- Transit type: Rapid transit; Cable car; Translohr; Bus rapid transit; Bicycle-sharing system
- Number of lines: 12
- Line number: Níquia-La Estrella; San Antonio-San Javier; Oriente-Villa Sierra; San Javier-La Aurora; Acevedo-Santo Domingo; Santo Domingo-Arví; Miraflores-Trece de Noviembre; Acevedo-El Progreso; U. de M.-Parque Aranjuez/Ferrocarril Ave.; U. de M.-Parque Aranjuez/Oriental Ave.; South Corridor (under construction); San Antonio-Oriente; Caribe-La Palma
- Number of stations: 42 stations; 28 tram and BRT stops; 24 bus stops
- Daily ridership: 1.2 million (weekday 2023)
- Annual ridership: 446.3 million (2025)
- Website: SITVA

Operation
- Number of vehicles: 80 trains (3 cars per train); 499 gondolas; 31 articulated buses (30 natural gas + 1 electric); 111 feeding buses (47 natural gas + 64 electric); 12 Translohr

Technical
- System length: 85.12 km (52.9 mi)
System map
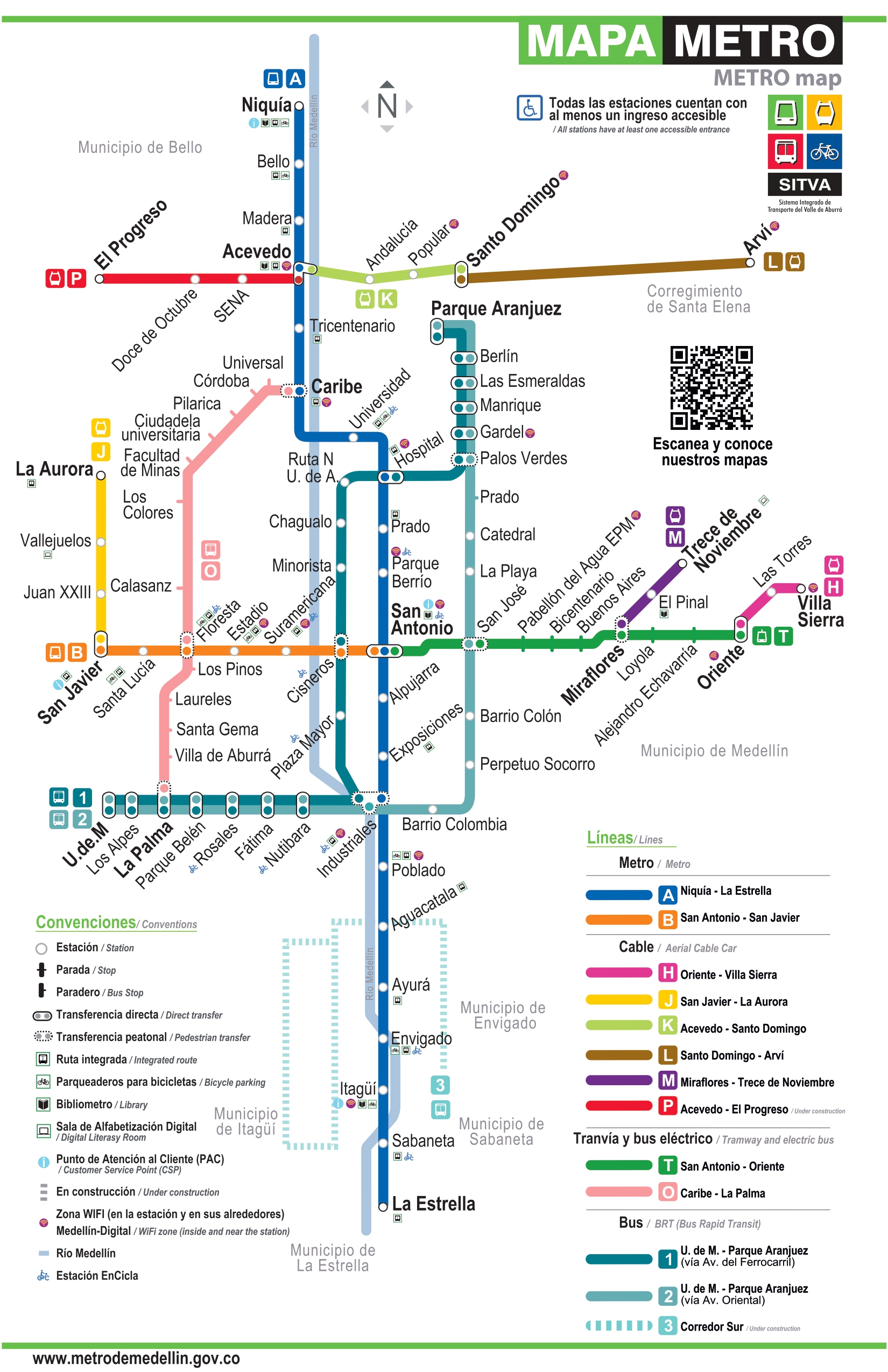
SITVA map

The Aburrá Valley Integrated Transport System (SITVA, Spanish: Sistema Integrado de Transporte del Valle de Aburrá) is the public transportation system of Medellín and its metropolitan area. It allows people from the Metropolitan Area of Medellín to move across the ten Aburrá Valley municipalities using different transport modes. It uses integrated fares and a single payment card (Cívica card).

== Components ==
SITVA includes the Medellín Metro, currently comprising two lines: Line A, which is 25.8 kilometres (16.0 mi) long and serves 21 stations, and Line B, which is 5.5 kilometres (3.4 mi) long and serves 6 stations (plus San Antonio station, the transfer station with Line A). There is also a tram line: Line T (Ayacucho Tram).

Additionally, the aerial cable car system, Metrocable, which supplements the metro system, comprises six lines: Line J with 3 stations (plus one transfer station with Metro Line B), Line K with 3 stations (plus one transfer station with Metro Line A and one with Line L), Line L with one station (plus one transfer station with Line K), Line H with two stations (plus one transfer station with Line T), Line M with two stations (plus one transfer station with Line T) and Line P with 3 stations (plus one transfer station with Metro Line A). SITVA also integrates a bus rapid transit (BRT) system (Metroplús), a minibus network called Sistema Integrado de Transporte (SIT) in Spanish and a bicycle-sharing system (EnCicla).

As of 2026, there are 26 metro stations, 14 Metrocable stations, 2 tramway stations (+ 6 tram stops), 22 BRT stops (+ 24 bus stops) in the SITVA network, all listed in the following table; for a total of 42 stations, 28 tram and BRT stops, and 24 bus stops. Transfer stations are in bold, and the transfer station between metro lines A and B is shown in bold-italic:

Name	Stations	Date of opening	Fleet	Commercial speed	Capacity (per vehicle)	Capacity (passengers/h-direction)	Travel time one journey	Top frequency (rush hour)
Metro services
**Line A** North to South; 25.8 km (16.0 mi); 21 stations	Niquía; Bello; Madera; **Acevedo**; Tricentenario; Caribe; University; Hospital; Prado; Berrío Park; **San Antonio**; Alpujarra; Exposiciones; Industriales; Poblado; Aguacatala; Ayurá; Envigado; Itagüí; Sabaneta; La Estrella	30 November 1995	80 three-car trains; for a total of 240 cars	40 km/h (25 mph); max. speed 80 km/h (50 mph)	300 users per car	41,480	42 minutes	3 minutes
**Line B** Center to West; 5.5 km (3.4 mi); 7 stations	**San Antonio**; Cisneros; Suramericana; Estadio; Floresta; Santa Lucía; **San Javier**	29 February 1996	80 three-car trains; for a total of 240 cars	40 km/h (25 mph); max. speed 80 km/h (50 mph)	300 users per car	16,231	10.5 minutes	3:50 minutes
Metrocable services
**Line K** North to Northeast; 2.07 km (1.29 mi); 4 stations	**Acevedo**; Andalucía; Popular; **Santo Domingo Savio**	7 August 2004	93 gondolas	18 km/h (11 mph)	8 users sitting, 2 standing; for a total of 10 users per gondola	3,000	9 minutes	0:12 minutes
**Line J** West to North; 2.7 km (1.7 mi); 4 stations	**San Javier**; Juan XXIII; Vallejuelos; La Aurora	3 March 2008	119 gondolas	18 km/h (11 mph)	8 users sitting, 2 standing; for a total of 10 users per gondola	3,000	12 minutes	0:12 minutes
**Line L** Northeast to far Northeast; 4.8 km (3.0 mi); 2 stations	**Santo Domingo Savio**; Arví	9 February 2010	55 gondolas	18 km/h (11 mph)	8 users sitting, 2 standing; for a total of 10 users per gondola	1,200	15 minutes	0:14 minutes
**Line H** East to far Northeast; 1.4 km (0.87 mi); 3 stations	Oriente; Las Torres; Villa Sierra	17 December 2016	44 gondolas	18 km/h (11 mph)	8 users sitting, 2 standing; for a total of 10 users per gondola	1,800	5 minutes	0:13 minutes
**Line M** East to Northeast; 1.05 km (0.65 mi); 3 stations	Miraflores; El Pinal; Trece de Noviembre	28 February 2019	49 gondolas	18 km/h (11 mph)	8 users sitting, 2 standing; for a total of 10 users per gondola	2,500	4 minutes	0:09 minutes
**Line P** West to Northwest 2.7 km (1.7 mi) 3 stations	**Acevedo**; SENA; Doce de Octubre; El Progreso	10 June 2021	138 gondolas	19 km/h (12 mph)	10 users sitting, 2 standing; for a total of 12 users per gondola	4,000	10 minutes	0:11 minutes
BRT services
**Line 1** West to Northeast; 12.5 km (7.8 mi); 20 stations	U. de M.; Los Alpes; La Palma; Parque Belén; Rosales; Fátima; Nutibara; Industriales; Plaza Mayor; Cisneros; Minorista; Chagualo; U. de A.; Hospital; Palos Verdes; Gardel; Manrique; Las Esmeraldas; Berlín; Parque Aranjuez	22 December 2011	30 gas working buses, 1 fully electric bus; for a total of 31 articulated buses	16 km/h (9.9 mph); max. speed 60 km/h (37 mph)	154 users per bus	3,270	45 minutes	2:45 minutes
**Line 3** Southwest/Southeast	South Corridor	Under development						
Feeding bus services
**Line 2** West to Northeast; 13.5 km (8.4 mi); 15 stations + 8 stops	U. de M. (station); Los Alpes (station); La Palma (station); Parque Belén (station); Rosales (station); Fátima (station); Nutibara (station); Industriales (station); Barrio Colombia; San Diego; Barrio Colón; San José; La Playa; Catedral Metropolitana; Palos Verdes (station); Gardel (station); Manrique (station); Las Esmeraldas (station); Berlín (station); Parque Aranjuez (station)	22 April 2013	47 gas feeding buses	13 km/h (8.1 mph); max. speed 60 km/h (37 mph)	90 users per bus	1,417	52 minutes	4:17 minutes
**Line O** North to South; 9 km (5.6 mi); 27 stops	Caribe; Floresta; La Palma	2 December 2019	64 electric buses	13 km/h (8.1 mph); max. speed 60 km/h (37 mph)	80 users per bus	800	45 minutes	6:00 minutes
Tram services
**Line T** Center to East; 4.2 km (2.6 mi); 3 stations + 6 stops	**San Antonio** (station); San José; Pabellón del Agua; Bicentenario; Buenos Aires; Miraflores (station); Loyola; Alejandro Echavarría; Oriente (station)	31 March 2016	12 tramway vehicles	16 km/h (9.9 mph); max. speed 70 km/h (43 mph)	300 users per tram	3,807	19 minutes	4:44 minutes
Total
	65 stations (48 stops)	Oldest: 30 November 1995 Newest: 6 June 2021	240 cars 498 gondolas 31 articulated buses 111 feeding buses 12 tramway	Fastest: max. speed 80 km/h (50 mph) Slowest: 13 km/h (8.1 mph)	Most capacity: 300 users per car/tram Least capacity: 10 users per gondola	82,502	Fastest journey: 4 minutes Slowest journey: 52 minutes	Least wait time: 0:09 minutes Most wait time: 6:00 minutes

== Expansions ==
=== Metrocable ===
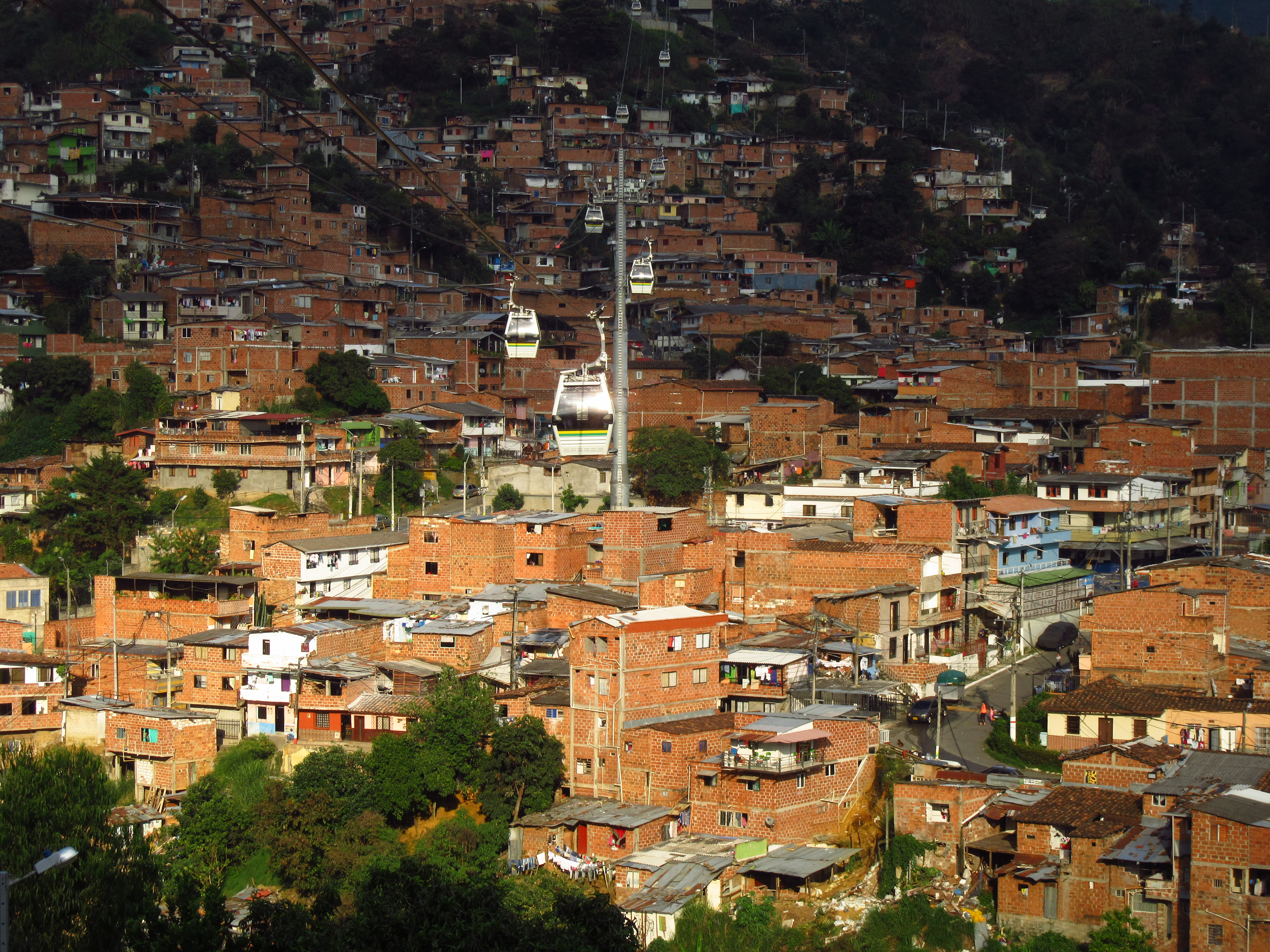
Line H of the Metrocable

On 7 August 2004, the city inaugurated a new line known as "Metro Cable" (Line K). The line starts in the Acevedo Station and goes to the up hill district of Santo Domingo Savio. This important addition integrated new additions to the city that since the 1960s that previously were not considered part of the "real city".

Line K (Metrocable) of the Metro de Medellín.

On 3 March 2008, a second "Metro Cable" line (Line J) was inaugurated. The line starts in the San Javier Station and goes through Juan XXIII and Vallejuelos to the La Aurora district. This new line benefits approximately 150,000 new users.

A new Metrocable line (line L) was inaugurated in 2009 with a transfer station at Santo Domingo Savio Station. This line continues further uphill to El Tambo in Arví park near Guarne. The reason for constructing this line is because the city wants to promote tourism in the rural area near Lake Guarne. It takes 14 minutes to ascend to El Tambo and there are no intermediate stations.

On June 10, 2022 there was a new "Metro Cable" line (Line P). The line starts from the Acevedo station and goes all the way to the El Progreso station, in the northwest. It takes approximately 10 minutes to go through all the stations, and it benefits 200,000 people.

=== Line A extension ===
Line A was expanded from Itagüí to La Estrella, in the south of the metropolitan area. A new intermediate station, Sabaneta, built near 67th South Street, was opened on 5 August 2012 and the final station, La Estrella, was built near 77th South Street and opened on 17 September 2012.

=== Train line ===
In February 2020 it was announced that Medellín will reactivate the train line between Bello and Caldas.
