= Hospital station (Medellín) =

Medellín metro station

Hospital Station Estación Hospital
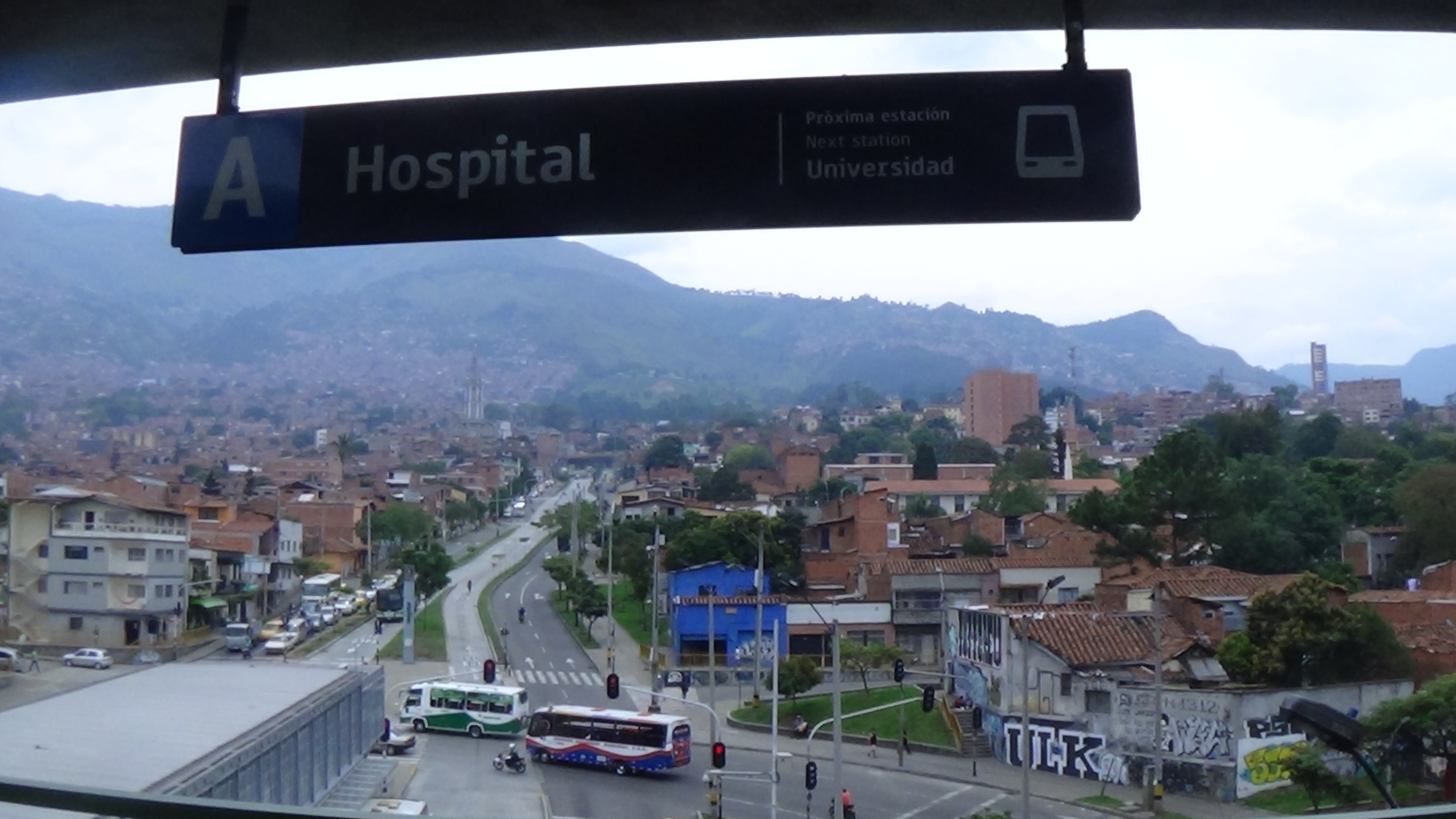
- View from Hospital station.

General information
- Location: Carrera 51 # 65-85., Medellín; Colombia
- Coordinates: 6°15′50″N 75°33′48″W

History
- Opened: 30 November 1995; 30 years ago

Services
Preceding station	Medellín Metro	Following station
Universidad towards Niquía	Line A	Prado towards La Estrella
Location

Hospital station is the eighth stop on line A of the Medellín Metro. It is located in the central eastern part of Medellín and stops at complex that can connect to the University Hospital of San Vicente de Paúl, for which it is named. The station was opened on 30 November 1995 as part of the inaugural section of Line A, from Niquía to Poblado.

== Description ==
The stop is located at the intersection of Barranquilla and Bolívar and has a pedestrian bridge that takes passengers to the University Hospital of San Vincente de Paúl. In the northeast of the station is the Museum Cemetery San Pedro. The station is integrated with Metroplús station also called Hospital, accessed by stairs or a special elevator for the disabled.
