= Hotel Nutibara =

Building in Medellín, Colombia

Coordinates: 6°15′08″N 75°34′02″W

- Hotel Nutibara Conference Plaza
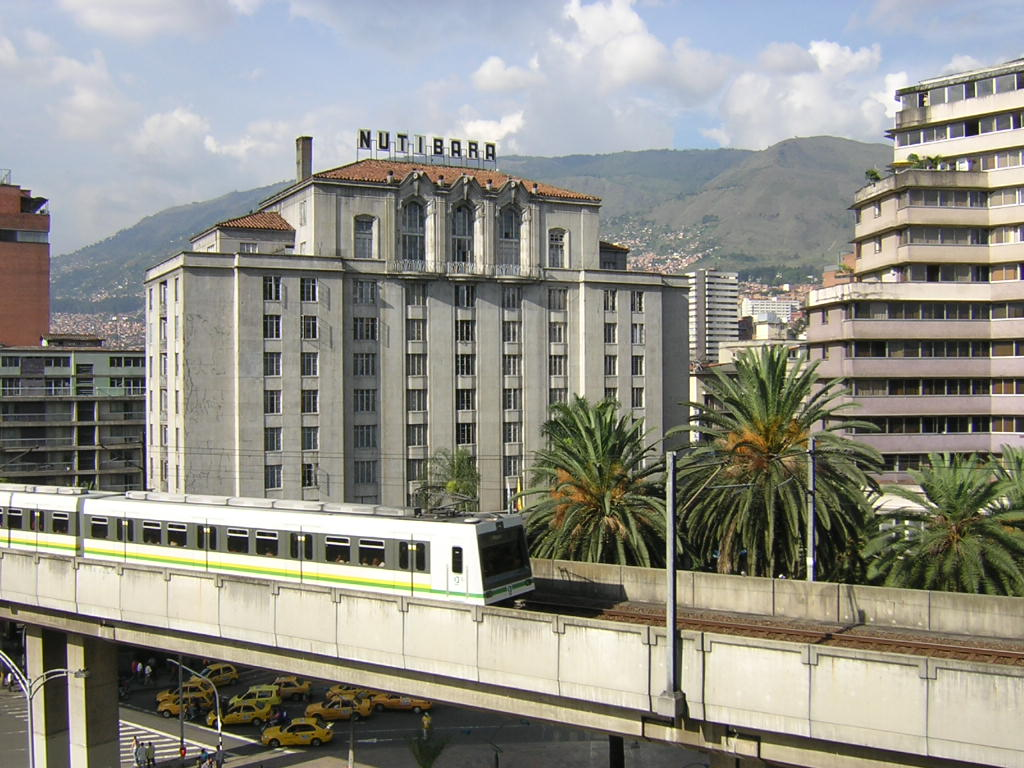
- Interactive map of the Hotel Nutibara area
- Former names: Hotel Nutibara

General information
- Location: Plazuela Nutibara Calle 52A no. 50-46, Medellín, Colombia, Colombia

Design and construction
- Architect: Paul Revere Williams

Website
- hotelnutibara.com

El Hotel Nutibara, is a hotel located in the city of Medellín, in the city center, next to the Parque Berrío station of the Medellín Metro and tourist sites such as the Museo de Antioquia, the Palace of Culture, the Berrío parks and Bolívar, the metropolitan cathedral and the Candelaria basilica.

Its name derives from a chief who inhabited the region, and name six of the lounges are related to Amerindian culture: Bochica, Tairona, Quimbaya, Katío, Bachué, and Nutabe.

The hotel's restaurant is La Orquídea.

It had been a staying place for Los Pelukas, pioneer rock band recorded in Colombia.

== History ==
Hotel Nutibara was designed by American architect Paul Williams, who was not well known in Medellín prior to this building. Plans for a hotel in central Medellín were proposed in 1937, and Hotel Nutibara was established in 1945.

The idea of its foundation began in 1936, when Medellín had only 150,000 inhabitants. By then, the Assembly of Antioquia, through Ordinance number 10, authorized the governor of the Department, Alberto Jaramillo Sánchez, to promote the construction of the work that would translate the ideals of the "Company of the Hotel Nutibara SA", on April 22, 1936 .

Four years later, in September 1940, the demolition of the buildings built on the grounds for the Hotel and another five more began. On July 18, 1945, the Nutibara Hotel was inaugurated.

"The Nutibara Hotel is an example of all the modernist architecture of the 1940s, which predates the architecture of the modern movement, in which the city developed with expressions such as the American art deco by Paul Williams, which marks its aesthetics and its form. The Europa Hotel already existed, which shows that there was an opening towards tourism, but the elites of the city believed that it was not adequate, that a more modern one was needed, that it had the capacity to offer and greater aesthetics ", Luis Fernando González Escobar, director of the School of Habitat of the National University of Colombia, Medellín, reports.

Memories and stories

As of its opening, famous guests arrived at the Hotel Nutibara: "Jorge Eliécer Gaitán, Alfonso López Michelsen, Mariano Ospina Pérez, Débora Arango, Belisario Betancur, Eduardo Santos, Gabriel García Márquez", are some of the names of its current manager, Laura Sierra, who also remembers the visits of "Andrés Cepeda, Pelé, Willie Colón and Chavela Vargas".

"Currently celebrities are still visiting us. For example, Los Visconti, Tormenta y Bárbara, singers, as well as other guests who have been loyal to the Hotel for 40 years, "says Sierra.

In that perspective, the representative of artists Manuela Villada Pérez says that "when we sometimes make contracts with stars that came to Medellín in decades like the 60s, 70s and 80s, they ask us to be hosted in Nutibara, they describe it as a jewel".

The surroundings of the Hotel have memories for many, as is the case of Miguel Ángel Betancur, who in his stories tells that his father, the sculptor Jorge Horacio Betancur, "together with the teacher Rafael Sáenz, took his students to an open-air school in Plazuela Nutibara, seeking support from government entities, approached art, that place was very important ".
