= Berrío Park station =

Medellín metro station

Berrío Park Station Estacion Parque Berrío
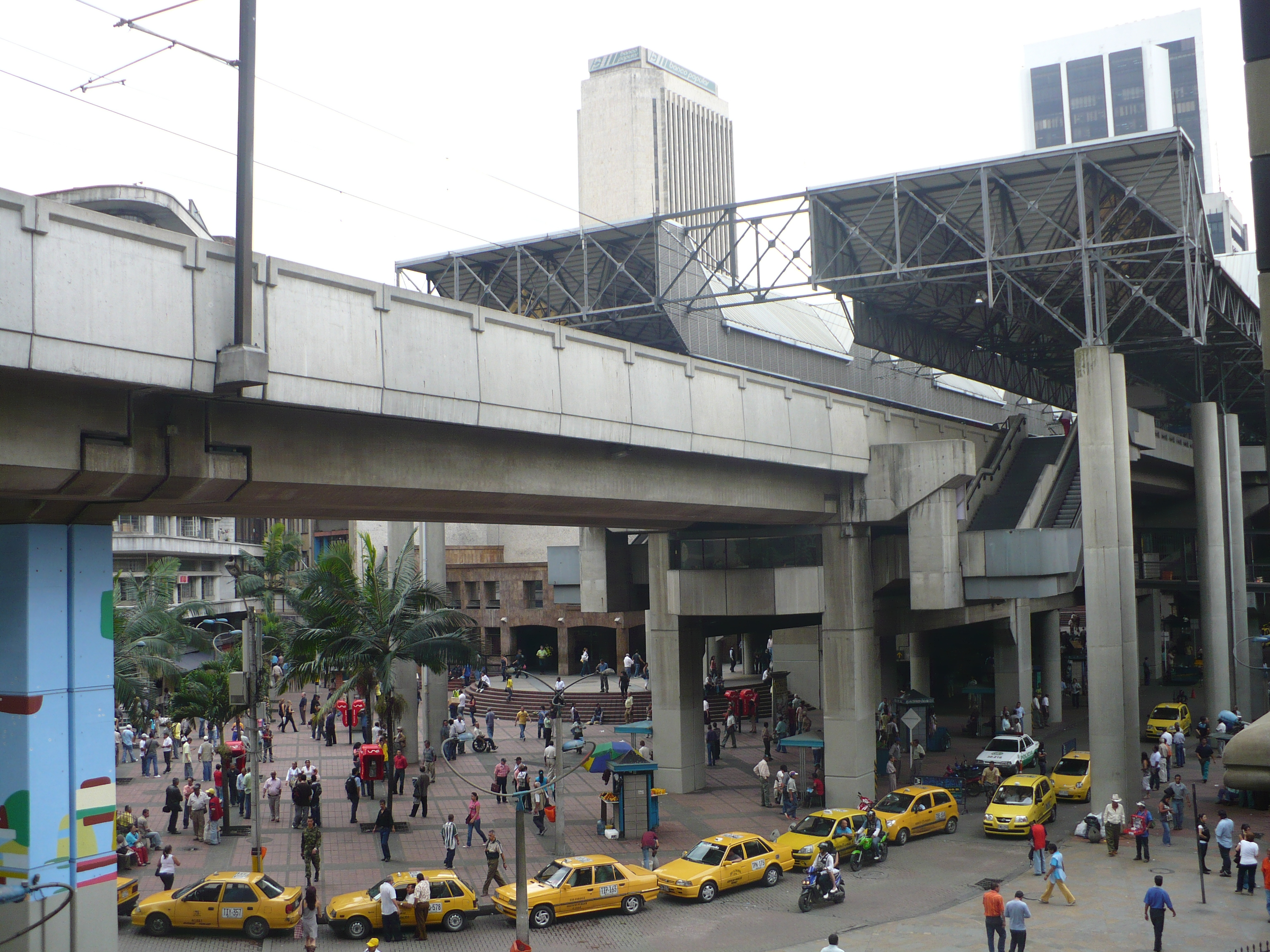
- North side of the station

General information
- Location: 52 Avenue # 50-26, Medellín; Colombia
- Coordinates: 6°15′01″N 75°34′06″W

History
- Opened: 30 November 1995; 30 years ago

Services
| Preceding station | Medellín Metro | Following station |
|---|---|---|
| Prado towards Niquía | Line A | San Antonio towards La Estrella |
Location

Parque Berrío Station, also known as Berrío Station, is the tenth station of the Medellín Metro and the tenth station on Line A from north to south. Due to its central location in the city, it is the most popular station for passengers to board. The station was opened on 30 November 1995 as part of the inaugural section of Line A, from Niquía to Poblado.

== Description ==
Its name honors Berrío Park in which the station is located, because the park began the growth of the city, although its design has changed over the decades. It also communicates with the headquarters of the University Corporation Remington, the Church of Veracruz and the Basilica of Our Lady of Candelaria.

The station, located at the junction between Colombia and Bolivar, is facing the Plaza Nutibara, the Palace of Culture, the Museum of Antioquia and the Hotel Nutibara. Adjacent to this hotel, you can find routes leading to Jose Maria Cordova International Airport. In the same area, Botero Park is an outdoor museum with sculptures by Colombian artist Fernando Botero.
