= Universidad station (Medellín) =

Medellín metro station

Universidad Station Estación Universidad
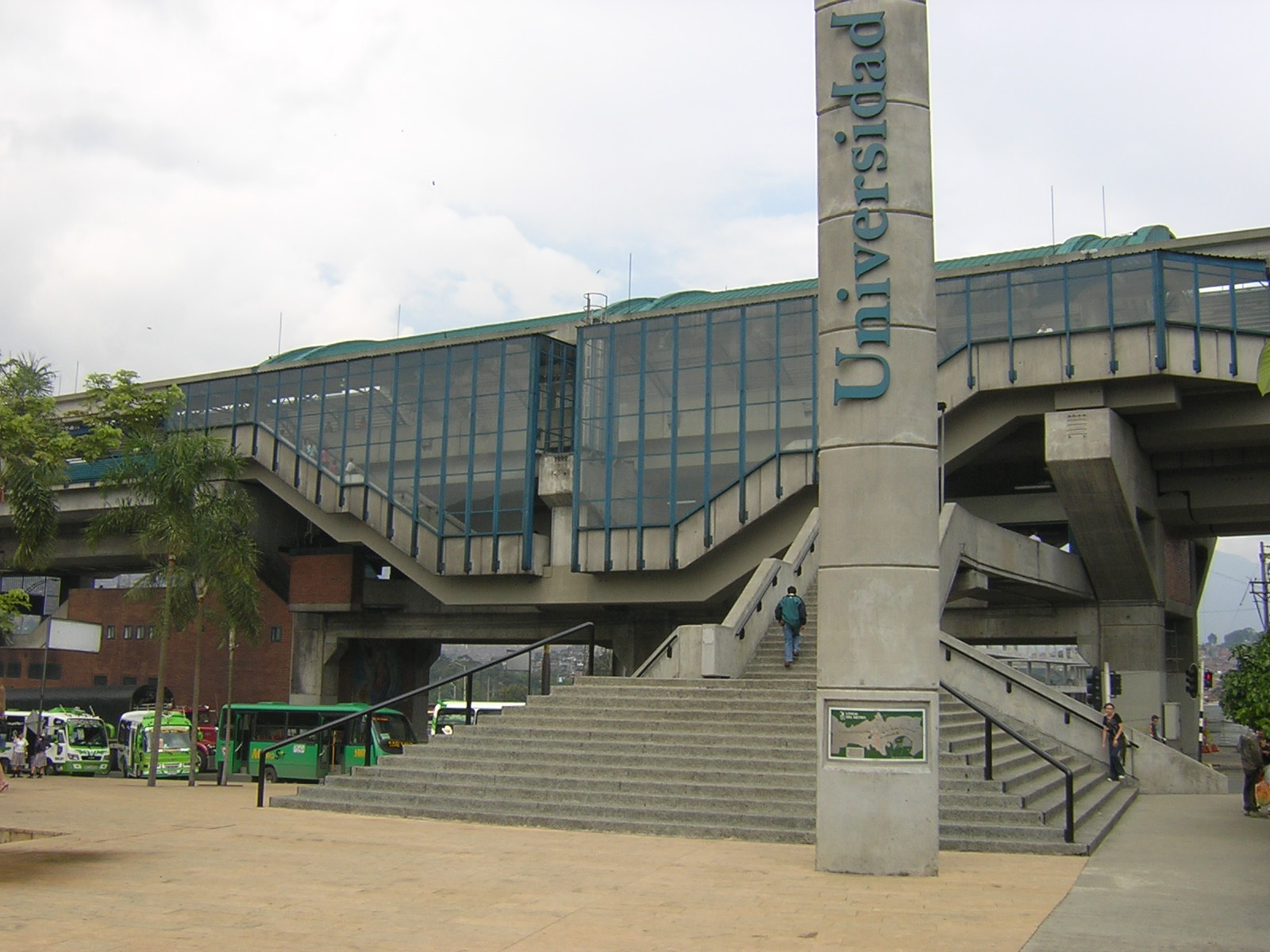
- The station from Wishes Park

General information
- Location: Calle 73 # 52-40, Medellín; Colombia
- Coordinates: 6°16′10″N 75°33′57″W

History
- Opened: 30 November 1995; 30 years ago

Services
Preceding station	Medellín Metro	Following station
Caribe towards Niquía	Line A	Hospital towards La Estrella
Location

Universidad is the seventh station on line A of the Medellín Metro. It is located in the eastern part of Medellín. The station is located in an area of great academic, cultural and scientific importance and a site of great confluence of routes to different parts of the city because its proximity to the University of Antioquia and metropolitan areas such the Botanical Garden of Medellín and Barefoot Park. The station was opened on 30 November 1995 as part of the inaugural section of line A, from Niquía to Poblado.

== Description ==
The station has a pedestrian bridge leading to the eastern entrance of the University City Main Campus of the University of Antioquia, one of the most important centers of higher education in the country, with an influx of more than 45,000 students and teachers. Inside the campus is located among others, the University Museum, the Central Library, and a sports complex. It is for this reason that the station has been called "Universidad".

The station is also located near other important cultural attractions, including the Planetarium of Medellín and its astronomical park, a local attraction park and the Joaquin Antonio Uribe Botanical Garden of Medellin, and Parque Explora. Also it provides easy access to the House Museum Master Pedro Nel Gómez in the Aranjuez neighborhood through routes that lead to that neighborhood. The station communicates with the Carrera Carabobo and Railroad Avenue.
