= Caribe station =

Medellín metro station

Caribbean Station Estación Caribe
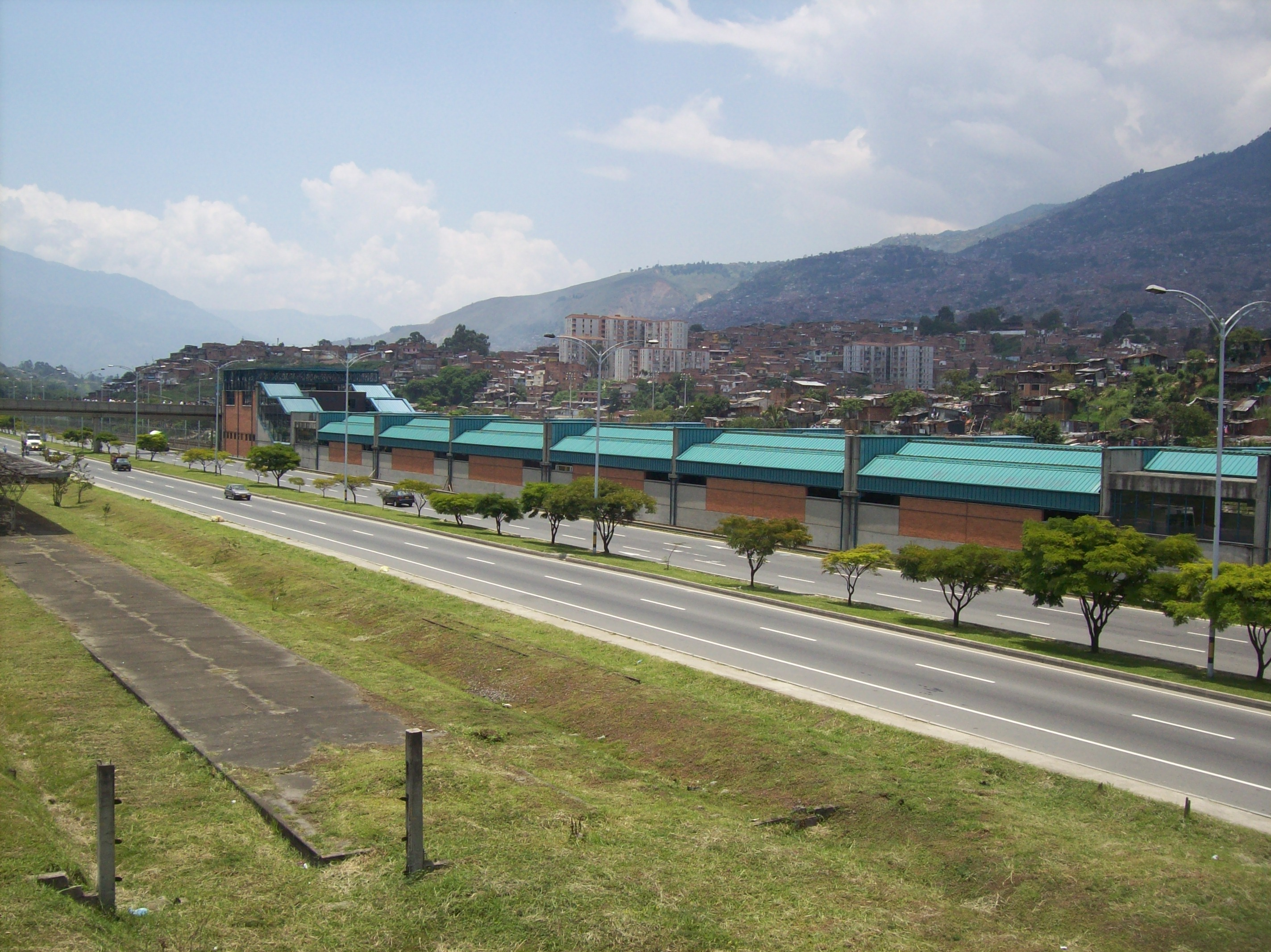

General information
- Location: Carrera 64 # 75B - 600, Medellín; Colombia
- Coordinates: 6°16′42″N 75°34′10″W

History
- Opened: 30 November 1995; 30 years ago

Services
Preceding station	Medellín Metro	Following station
Tricentenario towards Niquía	Line A	Universidad towards La Estrella
Location

Caribe is the sixth station of the Medellín Metro from north to south, serving line A, and is located in the northern part of the municipality of Medellín. The station was opened on 30 November 1995 as part of the inaugural section of line A, from Niquía to Poblado.

It lies between two major traditional working class areas of the city of Medellín: the Castilla and Aranjuez municipalities. With the town of Bello, said municipalities evolved through the history of development of the metropolitan area as the main areas of labor within the process of industrialization. As strategic urban and regional development, and a high number of population areas, the Medellín Metro is an important element of this part of the city.

== Description ==
From the station is a pedestrian bridge that goes to the Northern Bus Terminal, which has buses that go to a collection of urban routes to the Castilla, Robledo and Caribe zones in the northeast of the city. Another pedestrian bridge to the east leads to the Moravia zone.

The station is named after the neighborhood it is found in: Caribe. It was constructed in a zone that was once one of the most deprived areas of the city, known as the "Landfill", with the intention of improving the area.
