= Exposiciones station =

Medellín metro station

Exhibitions Estación Exposiciones
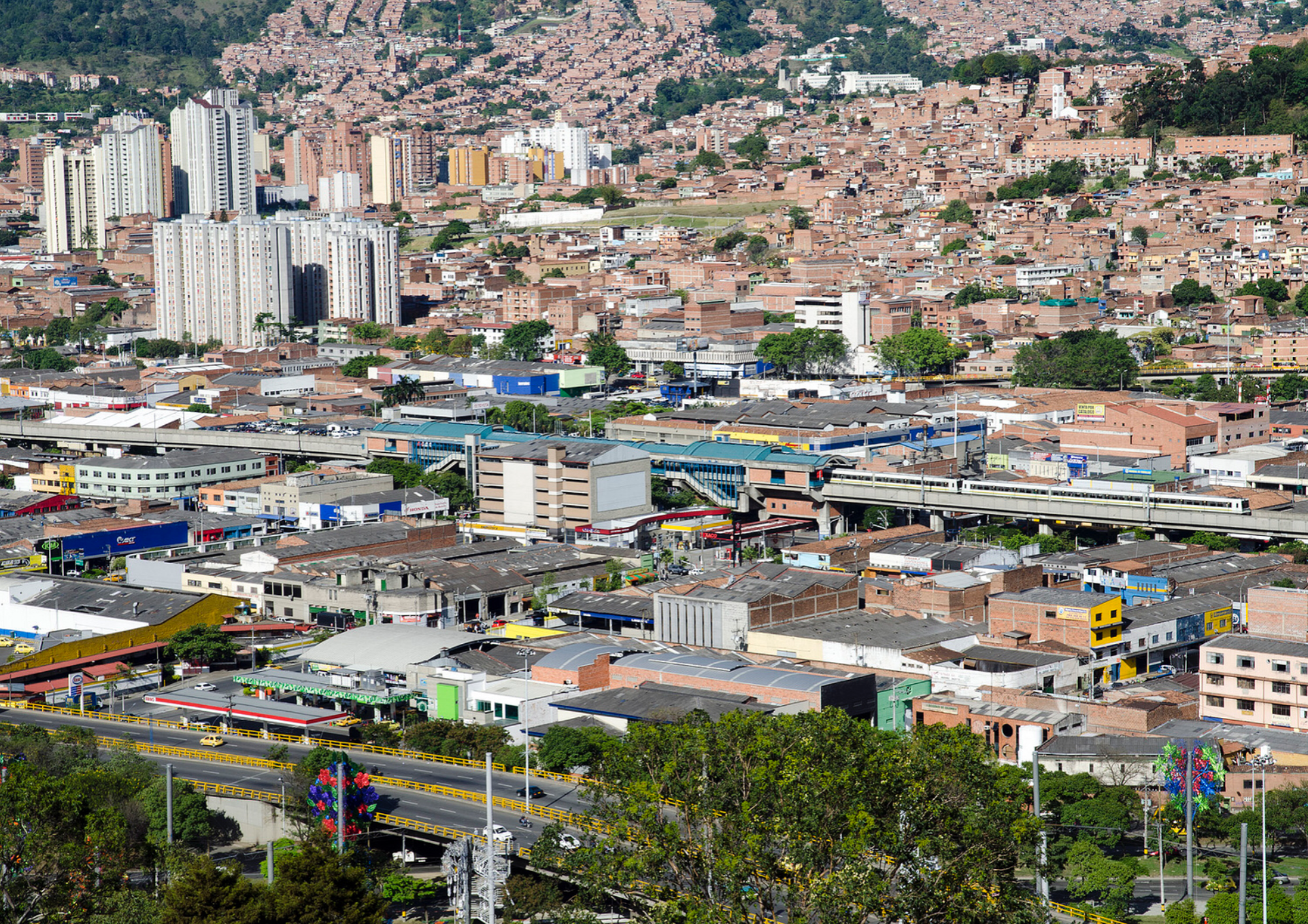

General information
- Location: Carrera 51 # 41-43, Medellín; Colombia
- Coordinates: 6°14′19″N 75°34′23″W

History
- Opened: 30 November 1995; 30 years ago

Services
Preceding station	Medellín Metro	Following station
Alpujarra towards Niquía	Line A	Industriales towards La Estrella
Location

Exposiciones is the thirteenth station on line A of the Medellín Metro from north to south. The station is located in the south-central area of Medellín in Colombia. It is named after the Plaza Mayor Conventions and Exhibitions center, and it is the first station on lina A that is not next to the Medellín River. The station was opened on 30 November 1995 as part of the inaugural section of Line A, from Niquía to Poblado.

From this stop, there are buses that go south toward Eastern Antioquia, including Retiro, La Ceja, and La Union municipalities. There are also buses that go to the South Terminal of Intermunicipal Transport, where lines leave for the south of the department and the country, such as the cities of Armenia, Manizales, Pereira, Cali, Popayán, and Pasto.
