= Via Crucis (Botero) =

Painting and drawing series by Fernando Botero

Via Crucis (Latin: Way of the Cross) is a series of paintings and drawings by Colombian artist Fernando Botero on the theme of the Passion of Christ, created in 2010 and 2011. Botero worked on this project for five months before exhibiting it in 2011 at the Marlborough Gallery, in New York. While he initially planned to sell the Via Crucis works, he ultimately decided to donate the 27 oil paintings and 34 drawings on paper (61 works) to the Museum of Antioquia, in Medellín.

== History ==
The series Via Crucis comprises 27 oil paintings on canvas of various sizes and 34 drawings on paper. It depicts various biblical chapters and figures that played a role in Jesus Christ's journey to his death on the cross, according to the Christian faith. Thus, numerous episodes of the Stations of the Cross are addressed, such as the kiss of Judas, the Crucifixion, the sorrow of the Virgin Mary, the burial of Christ, Pontius Pilate, the Crown of Thorns, and the Ecce Homo.

According to Ana Piedad Jaramillo Restrepo, director of the Museum of Antioquia, this exhibition allows the viewer to "see religion from a contemporary point of view, what is being suffered at this moment, and what the Stations of the Cross are today."

In order to create the Stations of the Cross, Botero drew inspiration from his many years of study and admiration for ancient art and the Italian Renaissance, particularly the paintings of Piero della Francesca. Attempting to approach it "through the eyes of a modern artist, in a spirit of great respect," Botero worked for five to six months." In the end, he created 40 oil paintings and 35 drawings.

== Public exhibitions ==
Via Crucis was first exhibited from October 27 to December 3, 2011, at the Marlborough Gallery, in New York. For Botero: "To suddenly have Christ brought to them is the opposite of everything that New York, a city that today is an apologia for vice, stands for and does". On April 3, 2012, the Via Crucis exhibition opened at the Museum of Antioquia, in Medellín, the Colombian artist's hometown. It was a considerable success, attracting approximately 5,000 visitors during its first three days. Afterward, it toured to the Ajuda National Palace, in Lisbon, Portugal, where it was exhibited from November 15, 2012 to January 27, 2013. From March 21 to September 30, 2015, it was on display at the Palazzo dei Normandi in Palermo, Sicily. It was also exhibited in the Palazzo delle Esposizioni, in Rome, from February 13 to May 1, 2016.

== Donation ==
While the Via Crucis was on display at the Museum of Antioquia, in Medellín, Botero announced on April 3, 2012, Good Friday, that he was donating the 27 oil paintings and 34 drawings that comprised the entire exhibition to the museum. According to a statement from the museum, Botero "wished to express the immense joy he felt at the reception of his latest work in the city, as well as the demonstrations of affection from his fellow citizens on his 80th birthday." With this act of generosity, the Museum of Antioquia now holds the largest collection of Botero's works in the world, with a total of 187 paintings, drawings, and sculptures.
