= Industriales (disambiguation) =

Industriales is a Cuban baseball team.

Industriales may also refer to:

- Industriales de Monterrey, Mexican baseball team
- Industriales de Valencia, Venezuelan baseball team
- Industriales Naucalpan F.C., Mexican football club
- Industriales station, Medellin Metro, Colombia
