= Alpujarra station =

Medellín metro station

Alpujarra Estación Alpujarra
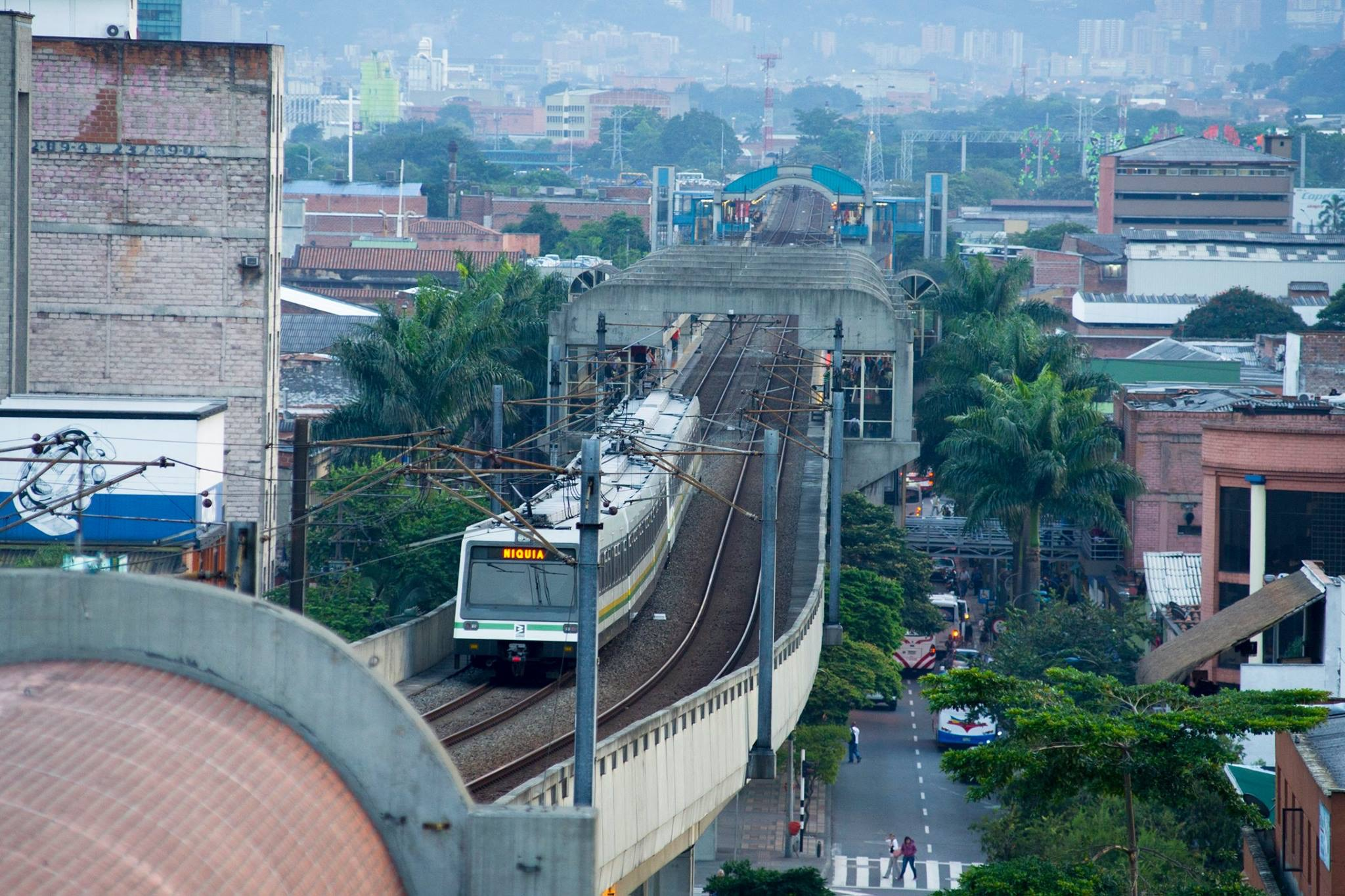

General information
- Location: Carrera 51 # 41-43, Medellín; Colombia
- Coordinates: 6°14′35″N 75°34′17″W

History
- Opened: 30 November 1995; 30 years ago

Services
Preceding station	Medellín Metro	Following station
San Antonio towards Niquía	Line A	Exposiciones towards La Estrella
Location

Alpujarra is the twelfth station on Medellín Metro from north to south. It is located in the center of the municipality of Medellín and is adjacent to La Alpujarra Administrative Center, which it is named after. Alpujarra is also located near the Barefoot Park, the Medellín Metropolitan Theatre, the Interactive Museum EPM, and Plaza Cisneros. The station was opened on 30 November 1995 as part of the inaugural section of Line A, from Niquía to Poblado.

The station is adjacent to the San Juan Avenue, a road that crosses the city from east to west central downtown and that provides easy access from Buenos Aires to the east with La Américan to the west. It is also on Bolívar Avenue, leading from downtown to the South Highway that goes to the southwest of Colombia.
