= Alpujarras (disambiguation) =

Alpujarras or Las Alpujarras may refer to various places in Spain:

- Alpujarra Almeriense, a comarca in Almeria Province
- Alpujarra Granadina, a comarca in Granada Province
- Alpujarra de la Sierra, a municipality in Granada Province
- Alpujarras, La Rioja, a mountain range and natural region in La Rioja, Spain
- Alpujarras, Andalucía, Spain
- La Alpujarra Administrative Center, in Antioquia, Colombia
  - Alpujarra station, a Medellín Metro station servicing the area
