= Estadio station =

Medellín metro station

Stadium Estación Estadio
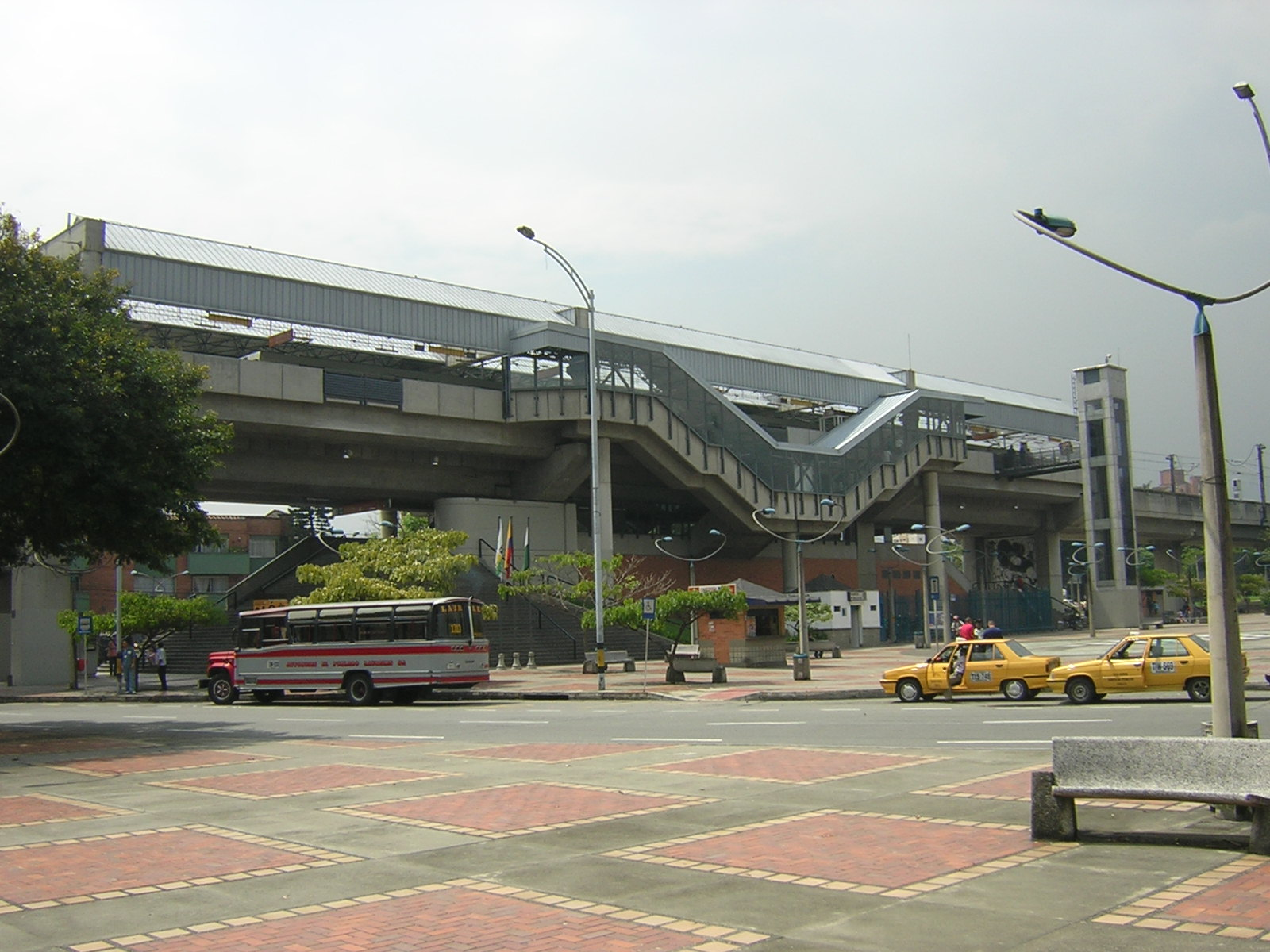

General information
- Location: Carrera 70 # 47 D 15, Medellín; Colombia
- Coordinates: 6°15′12″N 75°35′18″W

History
- Opened: 28 February 1996; 30 years ago

Services
Preceding station	Medellín Metro	Following station
Floresta towards San Javier	Line B	Suramericana towards San Antonio
Location

Estadio is the fourth station on line B of the Medellín Metro from the center going west. It is an elevated station named after the nearby Atanasio Girardot Sports Complex, which is the main area for sports activities in the Medellin Metropolitan Area. The sports complex hosted the 2010 South American Games and is where the two biggest football clubs in Medellín play, Atlético Nacional and Independiente Medellín. Located nearby are the headquarters for the daily newspaper El Mundo, the Pontifical Bolivarian and Luis Amigó Catholic universities, as well as the Unicentro shopping mall. The station was opened on 28 February 1996 as part of the inaugural section of line B, from San Javier to San Antonio.
