= Santa Lucía station (Medellín) =

Medellín metro station

Saint Lucia Estación Santa Lucía
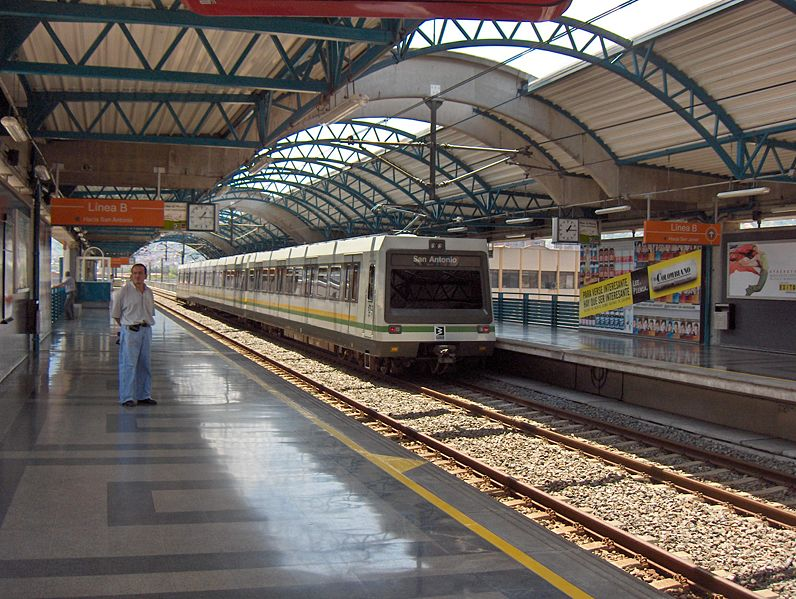

General information
- Location: Medellín; Colombia
- Coordinates: 6°15′29″N 75°36′13.5″W

History
- Opened: 28 February 1996; 30 years ago

Services
Preceding station	Medellín Metro	Following station
San Javier Terminus	Line B	Floresta towards San Antonio
Location

Santa Lucía is the sixth station on line B of the Medellín Metro from the center going west. It is named after the Santa Lucía neighborhood where it is located. The station was opened on 28 February 1996 as part of the inaugural section of line B, from San Javier to San Antonio.
