= Sabaneta station =

Medellín metro station

Coordinates: 6.1578°N 75.6161°W

Sabaneta Estación Sabaneta
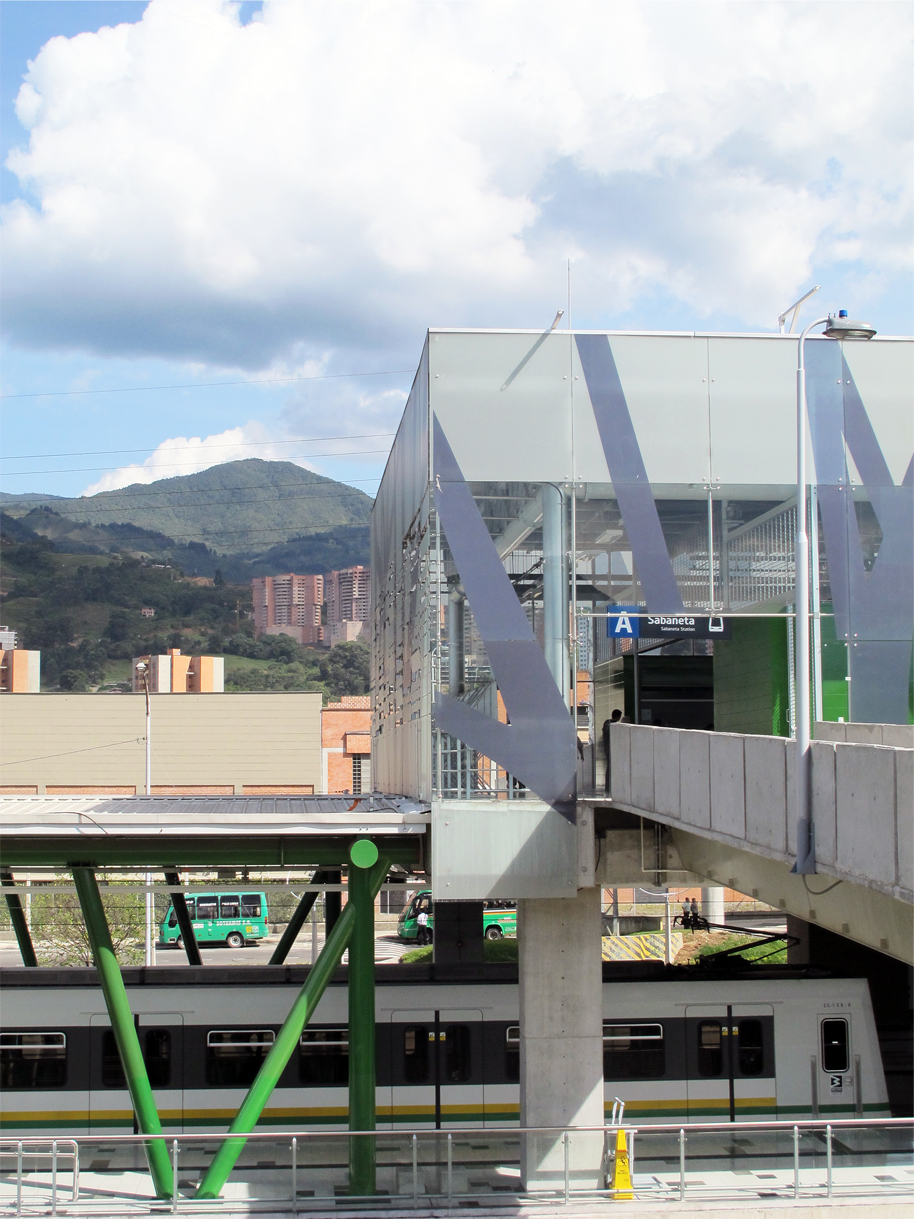
- Estación Sabaneta.

General information
- Location: Sabaneta, Antioquia; Colombia

History
- Opened: 17 September 2012; 13 years ago

Services
Preceding station	Medellín Metro	Following station
Itagüí towards Niquía	Line A	La Estrella Terminus
Location

Sabaneta is a station on line A of the Medellín Metro going south. The station was opened on 17 September 2012 as part of the extension of the line from Itagüí to La Estrella. This station is known for having a more modern appearance than the other stations.
