= Medellín Metro =

Urban train in Medellín, Colombia

- Logo of Medellín Metro

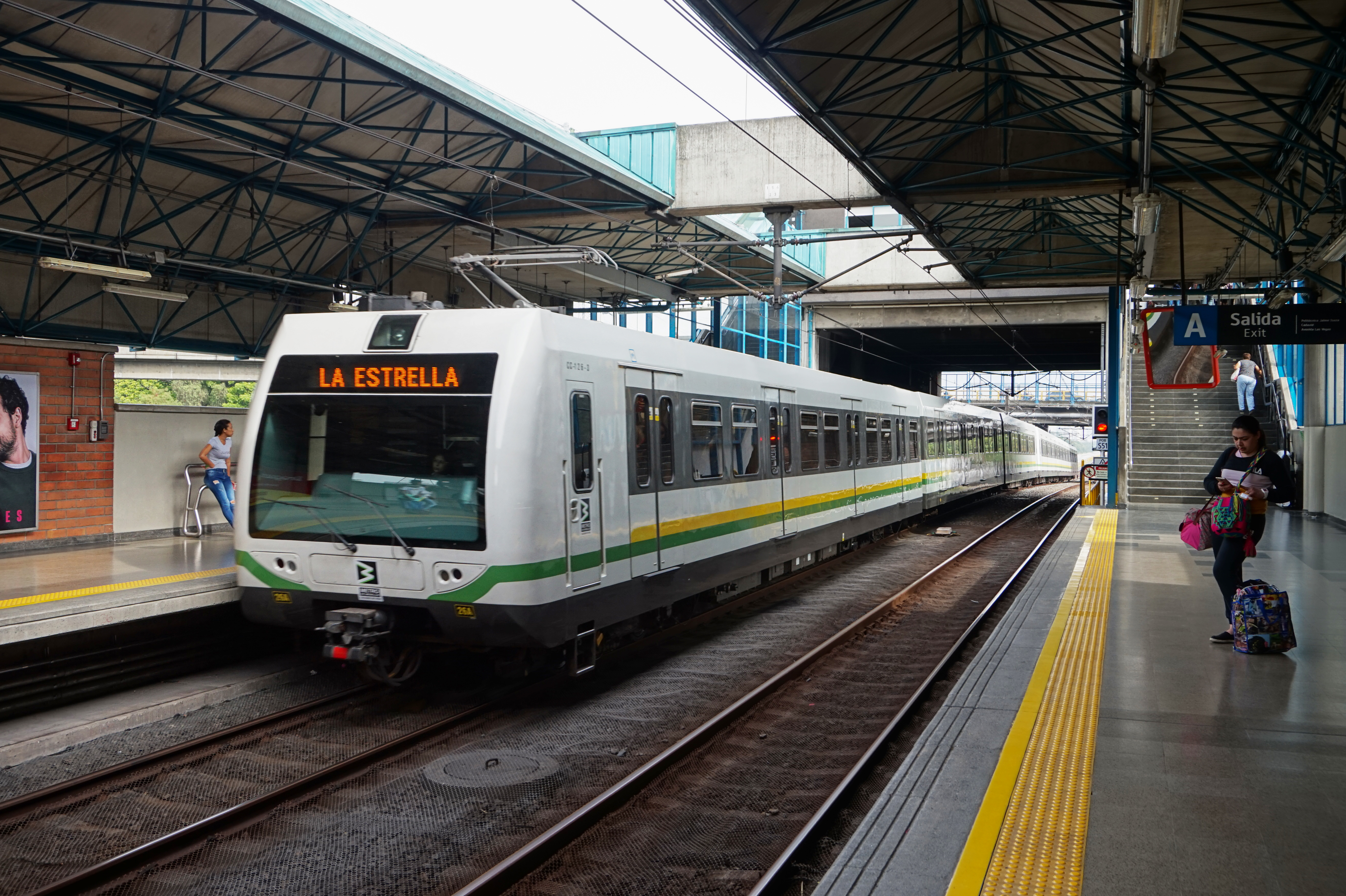
- Train arriving at Poblado station

Overview
- Owner: Department of Antioquia, Medellín City
- Area served: Bello, Antioquia; Medellín; Envigado; Itagüí; Sabaneta, Antioquia; La Estrella, Antioquia
- Locale: Metropolitan Area of the Aburrá Valley, Antioquia, Colombia
- Transit type: Rapid transit
- Number of lines: 2
- Line number: (Metro) (Metrocable) (Tramway) (Metroplús BRT)
- Number of stations: 27
- Annual ridership: 202.45 million (2025)
- Website: Medellín Metro

Operation
- Began operation: 30 November 1995; 30 years ago
- Operator: Metro de Medellín
- Character: At-grade and elevated
- Number of vehicles: 80 trains (3 cars per train)

Technical
- System length: 31.3 km (19.4 mi)
- Track gauge: 1,435 mm (4 ft 8 1/2 in) standard gauge
- Electrification: 1,500 V DC overhead
System map
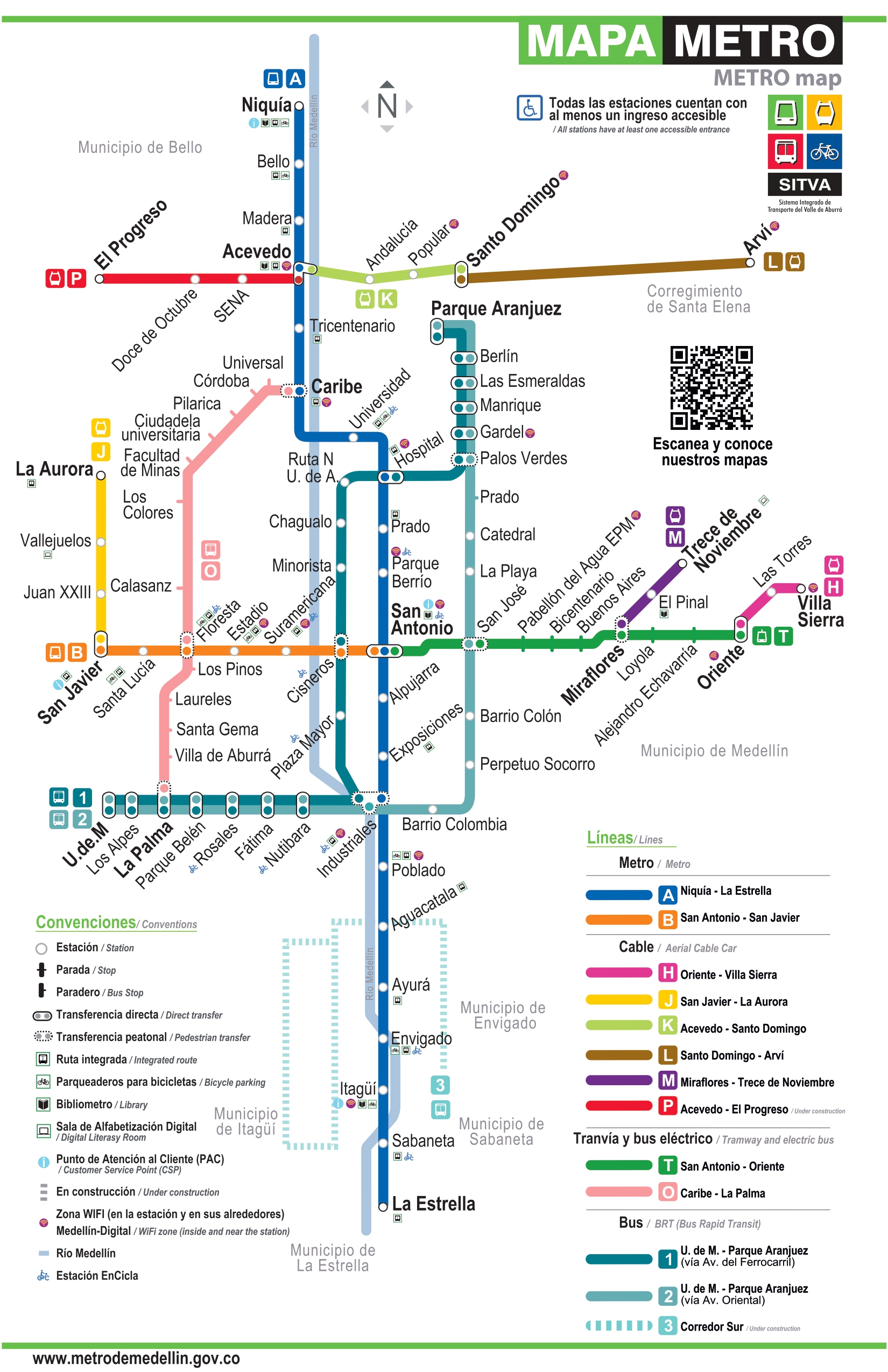
Medellín Metro Map

The Medellín Metro (Spanish: Metro de Medellín) is a rapid transit system that crosses the Metropolitan Area of Medellín from North to South and from Centre to West. It first opened for service on 30 November 1995. As one of the first implementations of modern mass transportation in Colombia and the only metro system in the country, the Medellín Metro is a product of the urban planning of the Antioquia department of Colombia. It is part of the Aburrá Valley Integrated Transport System (Sistema Integrado de Transporte del Valle de Aburrá, SITVA).

The city of Medellín and its urban complex (ten cities in the Aburrá Valley) had a period of relatively recent industrial development that started in the 1930s. The streetcar (tranvía) at the beginning of the 20th century can be considered a predecessor of the current Medellín Metro. The company known in Spanish as Empresa de Transporte Masivo del Valle de Aburrá - Metro de Medellín Ltda was created on 31 May 1979.

== History ==
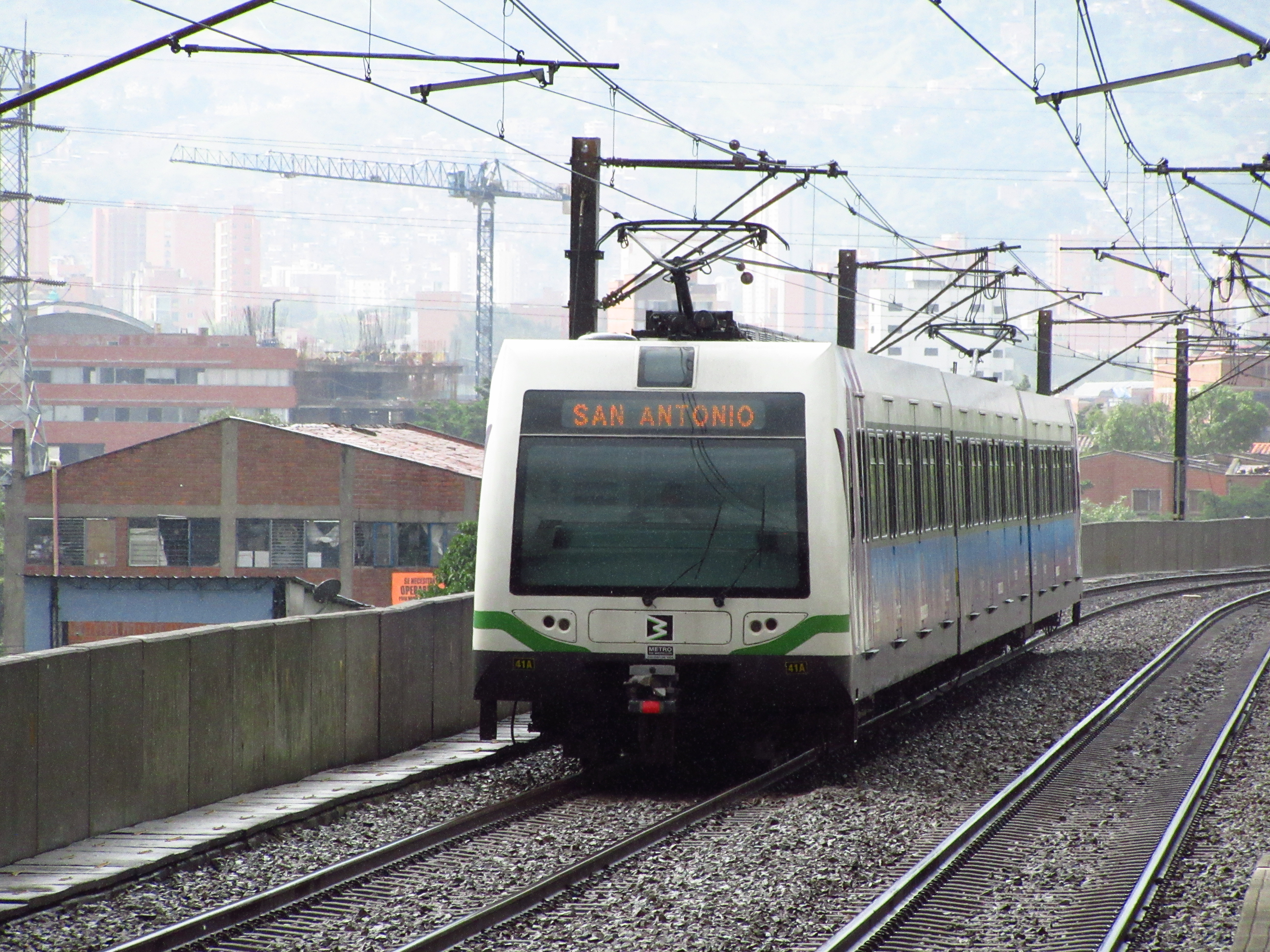
Train of Line B.

The railway history of Colombia and Antioquia has not been indifferent to the industrialization process that started at the end of the 19th century and that only has been restrained by the social and political conflicts of this South American nation.

The Antioquia Department, and the Paisa Region in general, owe their progress to the construction of railways that put them in direct contact with the rest of the country (especially with Bogotá, Cali and the Colombian Caribbean Littoral).

Although the famous Antioquia Railway came to a decline and is now only remembered by the so-called towns of the train, an urban railway system received the attention of the region. In the same way Antioquia's Railways had a century ago, the Medellín Metro became an important social, cultural and development axis in one of the most important cities of Colombia and South America.

The city's speedy urban growth, especially since the 1960s, has filled the entire Aburrá Valley and made towns touch its borders: Bello, Copacabana, Girardota, Barbosa, Envigado, Itagüí, San Antonio de Prado, La Estrella, Sabaneta and Caldas, among others. With the growth of the city placing Medellín among the most economically important cities in the nation, local leaders were compelled to view the city as a complex, urban system comparable to other industrialized cities in the world, rather than as a provincial town.

In the same sense, Medellín and its Metropolitan Area had to face the appearance of cartels during the 1970s, which produced serious problems of urban violence exacerbated by speedy urban growth and slow answers to the needs of the surrounding communities. The city grew due to big waves of migrants coming from the Colombian countryside looking for refuge from internal political conflict. This background explains why the young city would face urban violence with the same intensity as large metropolitan areas such as New York City, Mexico City or Rio de Janeiro and why the city had to create urban projects in answer to its conflicts and growth. The Medellín Metro was created not only as a massive urban transport solution for the working class residents of the city, but also as an important cultural symbol that would help develop marginalized sectors. The Metro would change the concept of public space in a city built for business and factories that had the systematic issue of lacking space for things like tourism.

As a company, the Medellín Metro was created for the administration and operation of the Metro system. It was founded with the association of the Medellín Municipality and the Antioquia Government. In 1979, research on economic and technical possibilities began, performed by the company Mott, Hay and Anderson Ltd.

In 1980 the project was presented to the National Government, and in 1982 it was approved by the National Council of Economic and Social Policies. It also gave the company an external contract of 100% of the required resources for the work. In 1984 the company subcontracted German and Spanish firms.

On 30 November 1995, 11:00 (local time), the first journey between Niquía and Poblado Stations began. The first phase of the metro network was completed in 1996.

The citizens soon welcomed the new service, and the social and cultural impact was significant. The Medellín Metro soon became a symbol of the city (it was the first, and still the only, rail-based Metro system in Colombia) which encouraged tourism and new business growth in areas of the city. There were visitors first from other regions and cities of Colombia and afterwards from abroad. Importantly, the metro bridged previously disparate poor urban and wealthy urban areas. The Metro passes through districts with widely varied socio-economic compositions. For example, it passes through both "Lovaina" and "Poblado".

Commuters also saw a vast improvement in transit times. For example, a two-hour bus trip from Bello to Envigado requires only 30 minutes on the Metro.

== Network ==
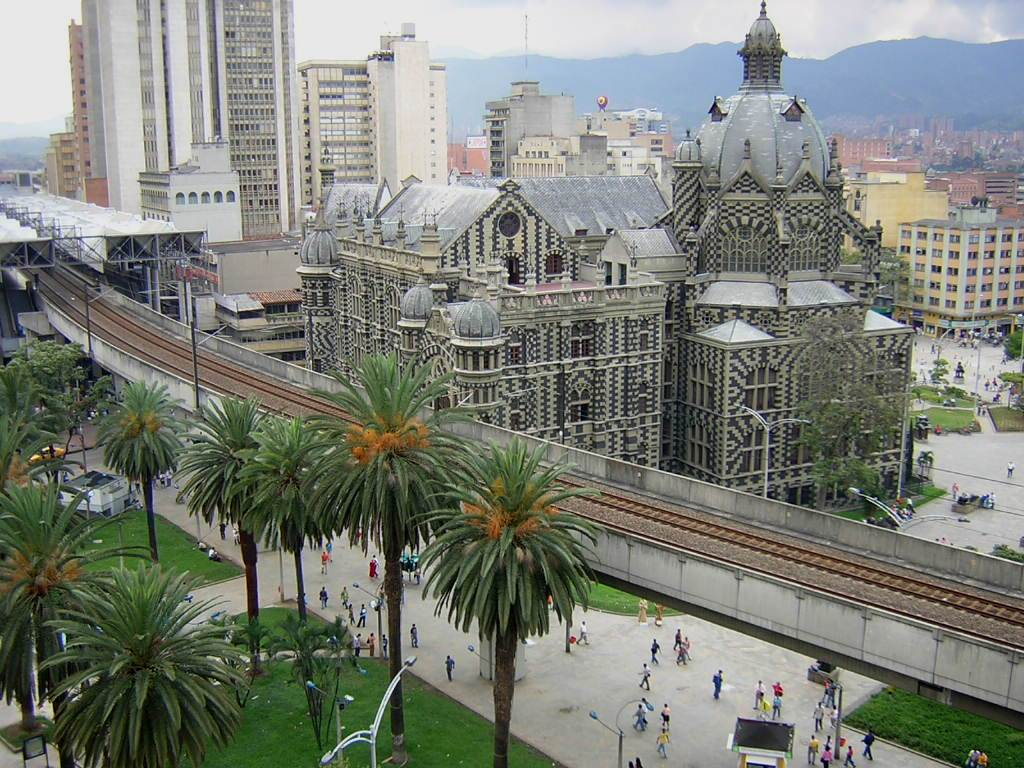
Berrío Park station

The Medellín Metro currently comprises two lines: Line A, which is 25.8 kilometres (16.0 mi) long and serves 21 stations, and Line B, which is 5.5 kilometres (3.4 mi) long and serves 6 stations (plus San Antonio station, the transfer station with Line A). There is also a tram line: Line T-A (Ayacucho Tram).

Additionally, the aerial cable car system, Metrocable, which supplements the Metro system, comprises five lines: Line J with 3 stations (plus one transfer station with Metro Line B), Line K with 3 stations (plus one transfer station with Line L), Line L with one station (plus one transfer station with Line K), Line H with two stations (plus one transfer station with Line T-A), Line M with two stations (plus one transfer station with Line T-A) and Line P with three stations (plus one transfer station with Line A).

As of 2019, there are 27 Metro stations, 18 Metrocable stations, 3 Tramway stations (+ 6 stops), 20 BRT stations (+ 8 feeding buses stops) in the Medellín network, all listed in the following table; for a total of approx. 79 stations (14 stops); transfer stations are in bold, and the transfer station between Metro Lines A and B is shown in bold-italic:

Name	Stations	Date of opening/Start of commercial service	Fleet	Commercial speed	Capacity (per vehicle)	Capacity (passengers/time-direction)	Time of travel for one journey	Top frequency (rush hour)
Metro services
**Line A** North to South; 25.8 km (16.0 mi); 21 stations	Niquía; Bello; Madera; **Acevedo**; Tricentenario; Caribe; University; Hospital; Prado; Berrío Park; **San Antonio**; Alpujarra; Exposiciones; Industriales; Poblado; Aguacatala; Ayurá; Envigado; Itagüí; Sabaneta; La Estrella	November 30, 1995	80 three-car trains; for a total of 240 cars	40 km/h (25 mph); max. speed 80 km/h (50 mph)	300 users per car	41,480	42 minutes	3 minutes
**Line B** Center to West; 5.5 km (3.4 mi); 7 stations	**San Antonio**; Cisneros; Suramericana; Estadio; Floresta; Santa Lucía; **San Javier**	February 29, 1996	80 three-car trains; for a total of 240 cars	40 km/h (25 mph); max. speed 80 km/h (50 mph)	300 users per car	16,231	10.5 minutes	3:50 minutes
Metrocable services
**Line K** North to Northeast; 2.07 km (1.29 mi); 4 stations	**Acevedo**; Andalucía; Popular; **Santo Domingo Savio**	August 7, 2004	93 gondolas	18 km/h (11 mph)	8 users seated, 2 standing; for a total of 10 users per gondola	3,000	9 minutes	0:12 minutes
**Line J** West to North; 2.7 km (1.7 mi); 4 stations	**San Javier**; Juan XXIII; Vallejuelos; La Aurora	March 3, 2008	119 gondolas	18 km/h (11 mph)	8 users seated, 2 standing; for a total of 10 users per gondola	3,000	12 minutes	0:12 minutes
**Line L** Northeast to far Northeast; 4.8 km (3.0 mi); 2 stations	**Santo Domingo Savio**; Arví	February 9, 2010	55 gondolas	18 km/h (11 mph)	8 users seated, 2 standing; for a total of 10 users per gondola	1,200	15 minutes	0:14 minutes
**Line H** East to far Northeast; 1.4 km (0.87 mi); 3 stations	Oriente; Las Torres; Villa Sierra	December 17, 2016	44 gondolas	18 km/h (11 mph)	8 users seated, 2 standing; for a total of 10 users per gondola	1,800	5 minutes	0:13 minutes
**Line M** East to Northeast; 1.05 km (0.65 mi); 3 stations	Miraflores; El Pinal; Trece de Noviembre	February 28, 2019	49 gondolas	18 km/h (11 mph)	8 users seated, 2 standing; for a total of 10 users per gondola	2,500	4 minutes	0:09 minutes
**Line P** West to Northwest 2.7 km (1.7 mi) 4 stations	**Acevedo**; SENA; Doce de Octubre; El Progreso	June 10, 2021	138 gondolas	19 km/h (12 mph)	10 users seated, 2 standing; for a total of 12 users per gondola	4,000	10 minutes	0:11 minutes
BRT services
**Line 1** West to Northeast; 12.5 km (7.8 mi); 20 stations	U. de M.; Los Alpes; La Palma; Parque Belén; Rosales; Fátima; Nutibara; Industriales; Plaza Mayor; Cisneros; Minorista; Chagualo; U. de A.; Hospital; Palos Verdes; Gardel; Manrique; Las Esmeraldas; Berlín; Parque Aranjuez	December 22, 2011	30 buses (fueled by GNV), 1 electric bus; for a total of 31 articulated buses	16 km/h (9.9 mph); max. speed 60 km/h (37 mph)	154 users per bus	3,270	45 minutes	2:45 minutes
**Line 2** West to Northeast; 13.5 km (8.4 mi); 20 stations + 1 stops	U. de M. (station); Los Alpes (station); La Palma (station); Parque Belén (station); Rosales (station); Fátima (station); Nutibara (station); Industriales (station); Barrio Colombia; San Diego; Barrio Colón; San José; La Playa; Catedral Metropolitana; Palos Verdes (station); Gardel (station); Manrique (station); Las Esmeraldas (station); Berlín (station); Parque Aranjuez (station)	April 22, 2013	47 feeder buses (fueled by GNV) 64 feeder buses (electric)	13 km/h (8.1 mph); max. speed 60 km/h (37 mph)	90 users per bus	1,417	52 minutes	4:17 minutes
**Line O** 9 km (5.6 mi) 14 stops	**Caribe**; Universal; Córdoba; Pilarica; Ciudadela Universitaria; Facultad de Minas; Los Colores; Calasanz; Floresta; Los Pinos; Laureles; Santa Gema; Villa de Aburrá; La Palma	November 30, 2019	47 feeder buses (fueled by GNV) 64 feeder buses (electric)	13 km/h (8.1 mph); max. speed 60 km/h (37 mph)	80 users per bus	800	45 minutes	6:00 minutes
Tram services
**Line T** Center to East; 4.2 km (2.6 mi); 3 stations + 6 stops	**San Antonio** (station); San José; Pabellón del Agua; Bicentenario; Buenos Aires; Miraflores (station); Loyola; Alejandro Echavarría; Oriente (station)	March 31, 2016	12 tramway vehicles	19 km/h (12 mph); max. speed 70 km/h (43 mph)	300 users per tram	3,807	19 minutes	4:44 minutes
Total
85.12 km (52.89 mi)	45 stations 26 stops 42 bus stops		240 cars 498 gondolas 31 articulated buses 111 feeding buses 12 trams			82,502		

=== Expansions ===
==== Metrocable ====
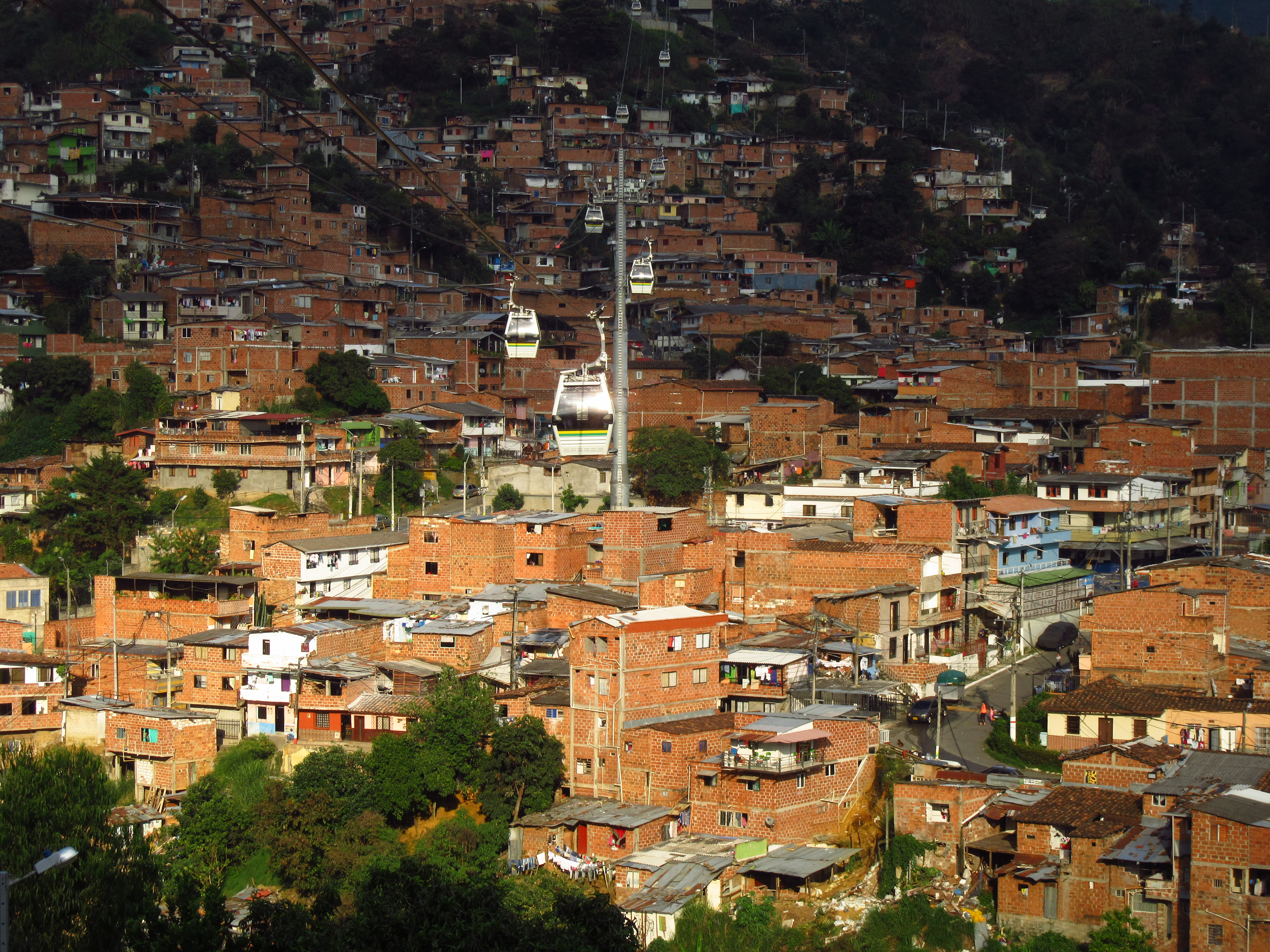
Line H of the Metrocable

On 7 August 2004, the city inaugurated a new line known as "Metro Cable" (Line K). The line starts in the Acevedo Station and goes to the up hill district of Santo Domingo Savio. This important addition integrated new additions to the city that since the 1960s that previously were not considered part of the "real city".

Line K (Metrocable) of the Metro de Medellín.

On 3 March 2008, a second "Metro Cable" line (Line J) was inaugurated. The line starts in the San Javier Station and goes through Juan XXIII and Vallejuelos to the La Aurora district. This new line benefits approximately 150,000 new users.

A new Metrocable line (line L) was inaugurated in 2009 with a transfer station at Santo Domingo Savio Station. This line continues further uphill to El Tambo in Arví park near Guarne. The reason for constructing this line is because the city wants to promote tourism in the rural area near Lake Guarne. It takes 14 minutes to ascend to El Tambo and there are no intermediate stations.

==== Line A extension ====
Line A was expanded from Itagüí to La Estrella, in the south of the metropolitan area. A new intermediate station, Sabaneta, built near 67th South Street, was opened on 5 August 2012 and the final station, La Estrella, was built near 77th South Street and opened on 17 September 2012.

==== Train line ====
In February 2020 it was announced that Medellín will reactivate the train line between Bello and Caldas.

== Rolling stock ==
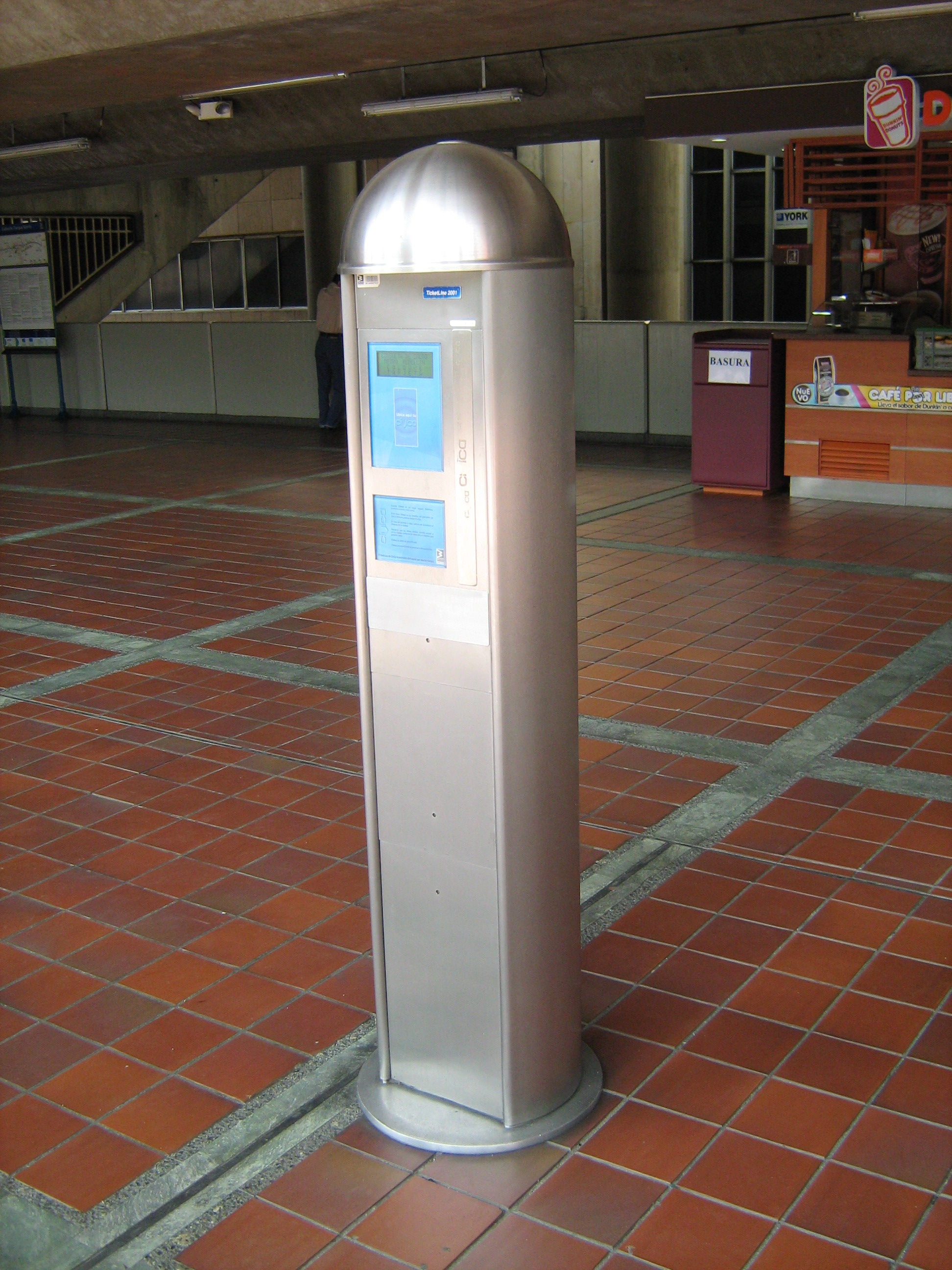
Arturito at Berrío Park station.

Initially, there were 42 three-car train sets built by the manufacturer MAN, however, in 2009, the Medellín Metro signed a contract with Spanish manufacturer CAF for 12 three-car train sets that were delivered between that year and 2011. In 2017, the Medellín Metro purchased another set of 26 CAF trains to complement their fleet, with 38 CAF trains in total, and 80 trains with both the MAN and CAF fleet.

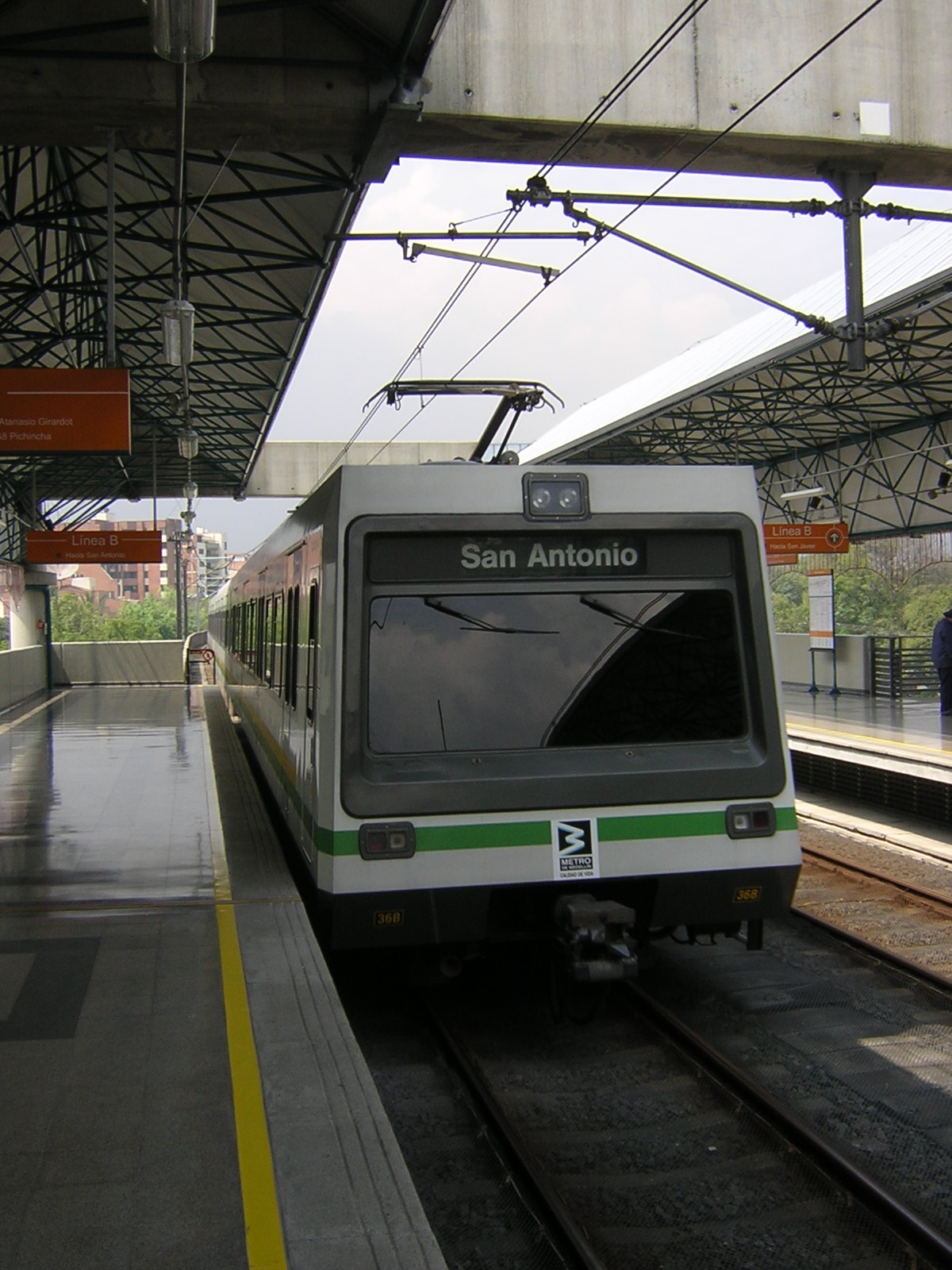
MAN Train

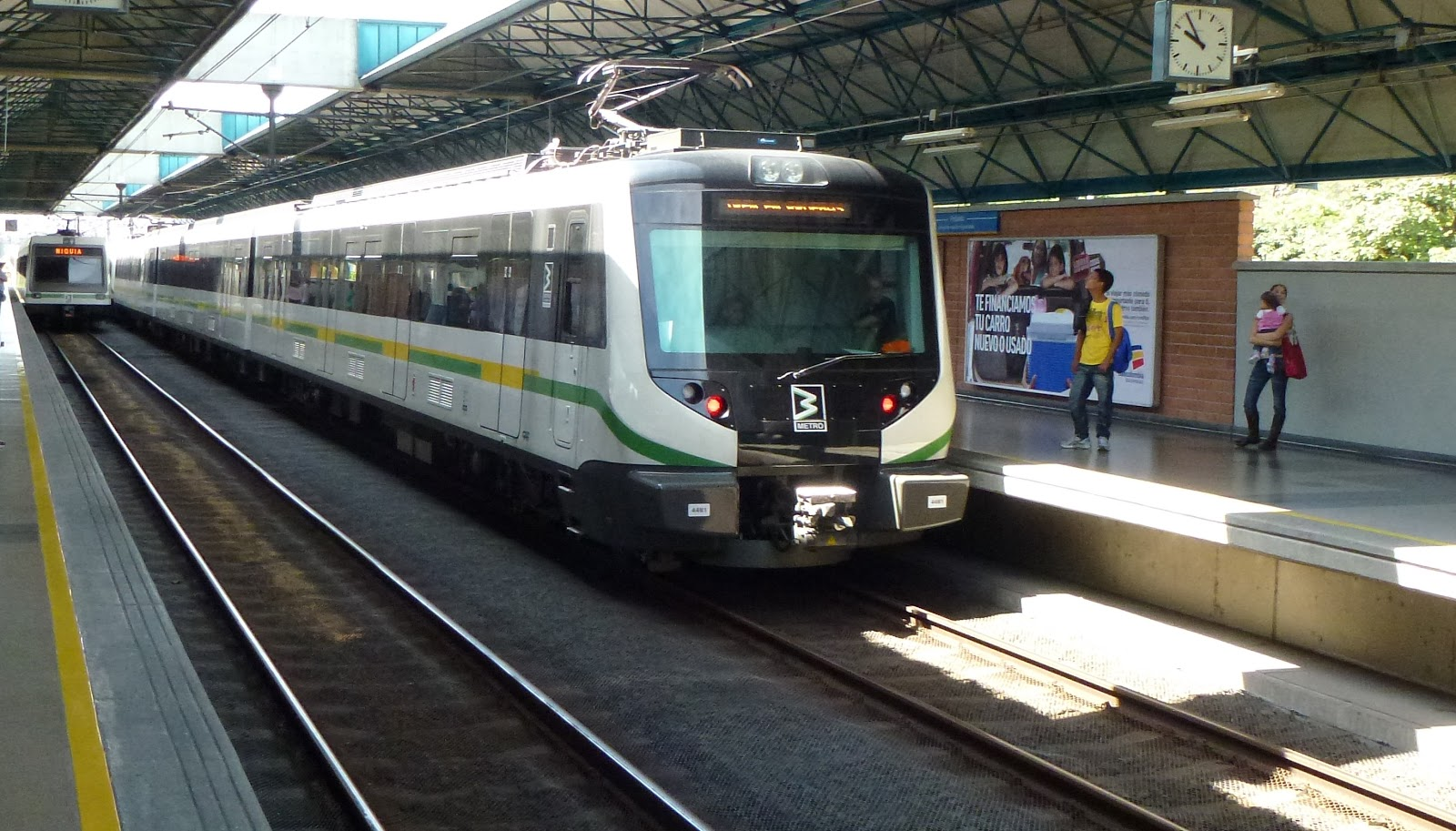
CAF Train

== See also ==
- List of Latin American rail transit systems by ridership
- List of metro systems
