= Floresta station =

Medellín metro station

Floresta Estación Floresta
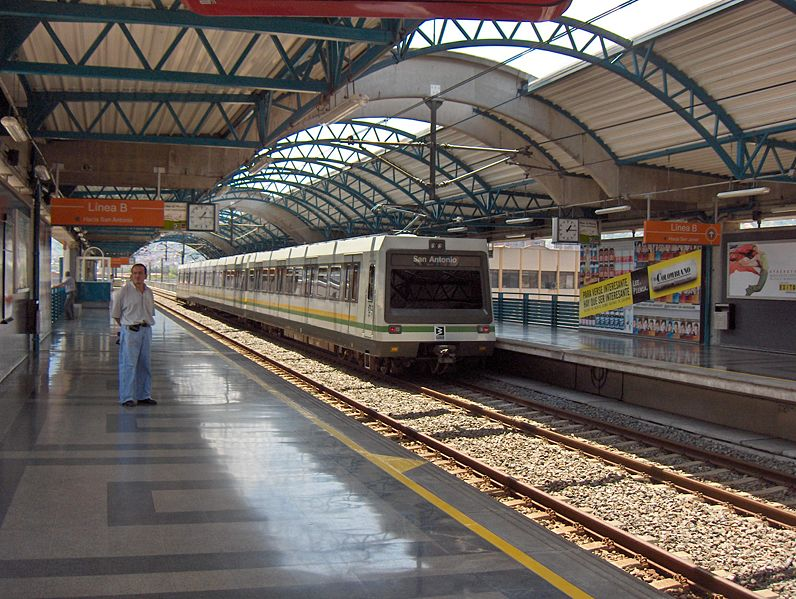

General information
- Location: Carrera 80 # 47 D 30, Medellín; Colombia
- Coordinates: 6°15′31″N 75°35′52″W

History
- Opened: 28 February 1996; 30 years ago

Services
Preceding station	Medellín Metro	Following station
Santa Lucía towards San Javier	Line B	Estadio towards San Antonio
Location

Floresta is the fifth station on line B of the Medellín Metro from the center going west. At its entrance is the mosaic Our Virgin Lady of Sorrows. The station communicates with part of the Atanasio Girardot Sports Complex, the Ethnographic Museum of Miguel Ángel Builes, and the Medellin headquarters of Sukyo Mahikari, among others. The station was opened on 28 February 1996 as part of the inaugural section of line B, from San Javier to San Antonio.
