= Industriales station =

Medellín metro station

Industrial Estación Industriales
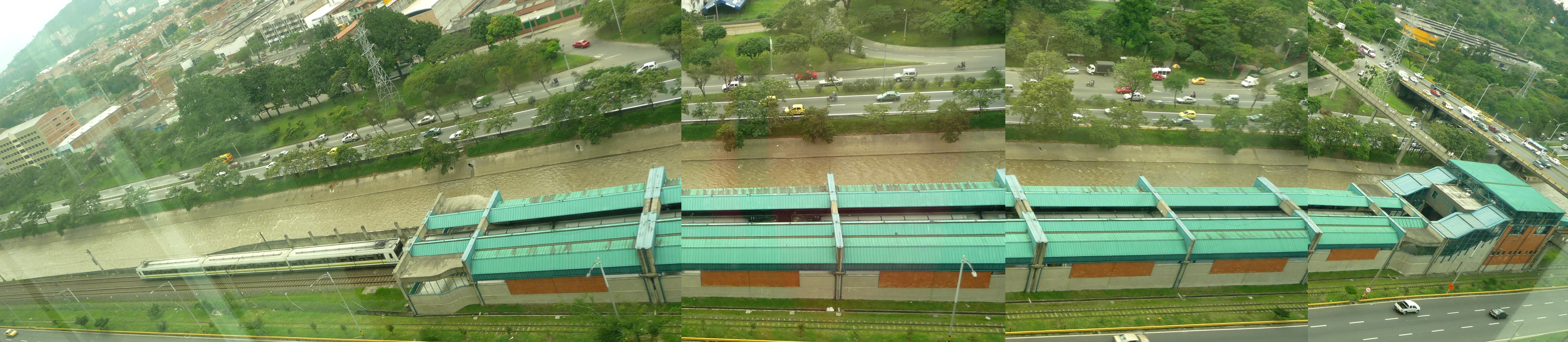
- Estación Industriales (Metro de Medellín)

General information
- Location: Carrera 49 # 24-435, Medellín; Colombia
- Coordinates: 6°13′48″N 75°34′32″W

History
- Opened: 30 November 1995; 30 years ago

Services
Preceding station	Medellín Metro	Following station
Exposiciones towards Niquía	Line A	Poblado towards La Estrella
Location

Industriales is the 14th station on the Medellín Metro from north to south, and the sixth on line A going south. It is one of the three transfer stations to line 1 of the metro bus system known as Metroplus. The station was opened on 30 November 1995 as part of the inaugural section of Line A, from Niquía to Poblado.

The station is located in the south-central part of Medellín, adjacent to the headquarters of Bancolombia, the Bridge of Argos and Nutibara hill. The station is located along the Medellin River and 30th Avenue, a road that crosses the city from east to west and connects the neighborhoods of El Poblado in Belén, being closest to the Sports Unit Belén station (although it is far from this) and adjacent to the South Highway that leads to southwest Colombia.

== Description ==
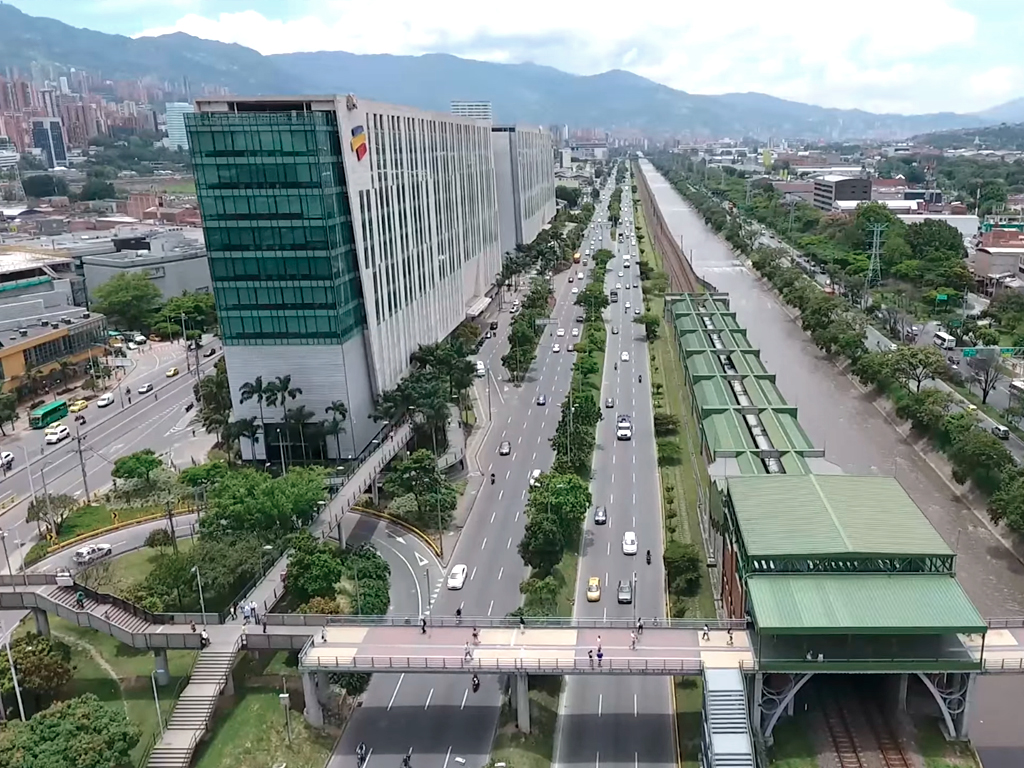
Estación Industriales (Metro de Medellín)

The Industriales station is named after the territory where it is located, which in turn honors those who have shaped the progress of a city with industrial and commercial vocation. From this part of the city to the south and along the river, there have been traditionally located major factories and industries in line with the national headquarters or originating from the department of Antioquia.

== Metroplus ==
This station will be integrated with the Metroplus bus system with the hope of facilitating movement in the city of Medellín.
