= San Antonio station (Medellín) =

Medellín metro station

San Antonio Estación San Antonio
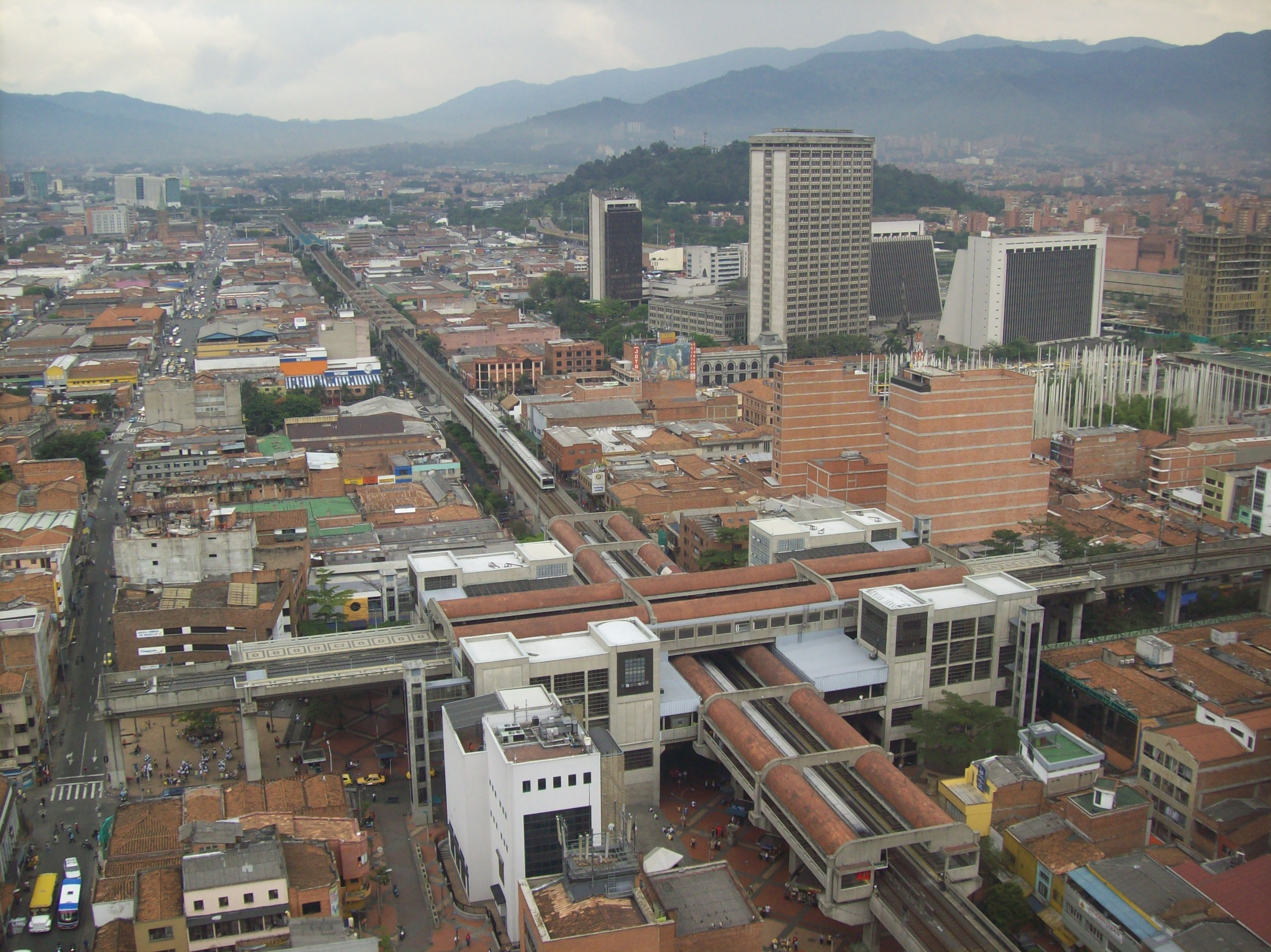
- View of the station from the Coffee Building

General information
- Location: Carrera 51 A # 46-08, Medellín; Colombia
- Coordinates: 6°14′50″N 75°34′11″W

History
- Opened: 30 November 1995; 30 years ago

Services
Preceding station	Medellín Metro	Following station
Berrío Park towards Niquía	Line A	Alpujarra towards La Estrella
Cisneros towards San Javier	Line B	Terminus
Terminus	Line T-A	San José towards Oriente
Location

San Antonio station is a station on the Medellín Metro. It is the terminal station for line B (center to west), and a transfer station to line A (north to south). It is named after the Church of San Antonio, which also gives its name to the nearby San Antonio Plaza. Line A station was opened on 30 November 1995 as part of the inaugural section of line A, from Niquía to Poblado. Line B station was opened on 28 February 1996 as part of the inaugural section of the line, from San Javier to San Antonio.
