= Museum of Antioquia =

Art museum in Medellín, Colombia

Coordinates: 6°15′09″N 75°34′09″W

- Museo de Antioquia
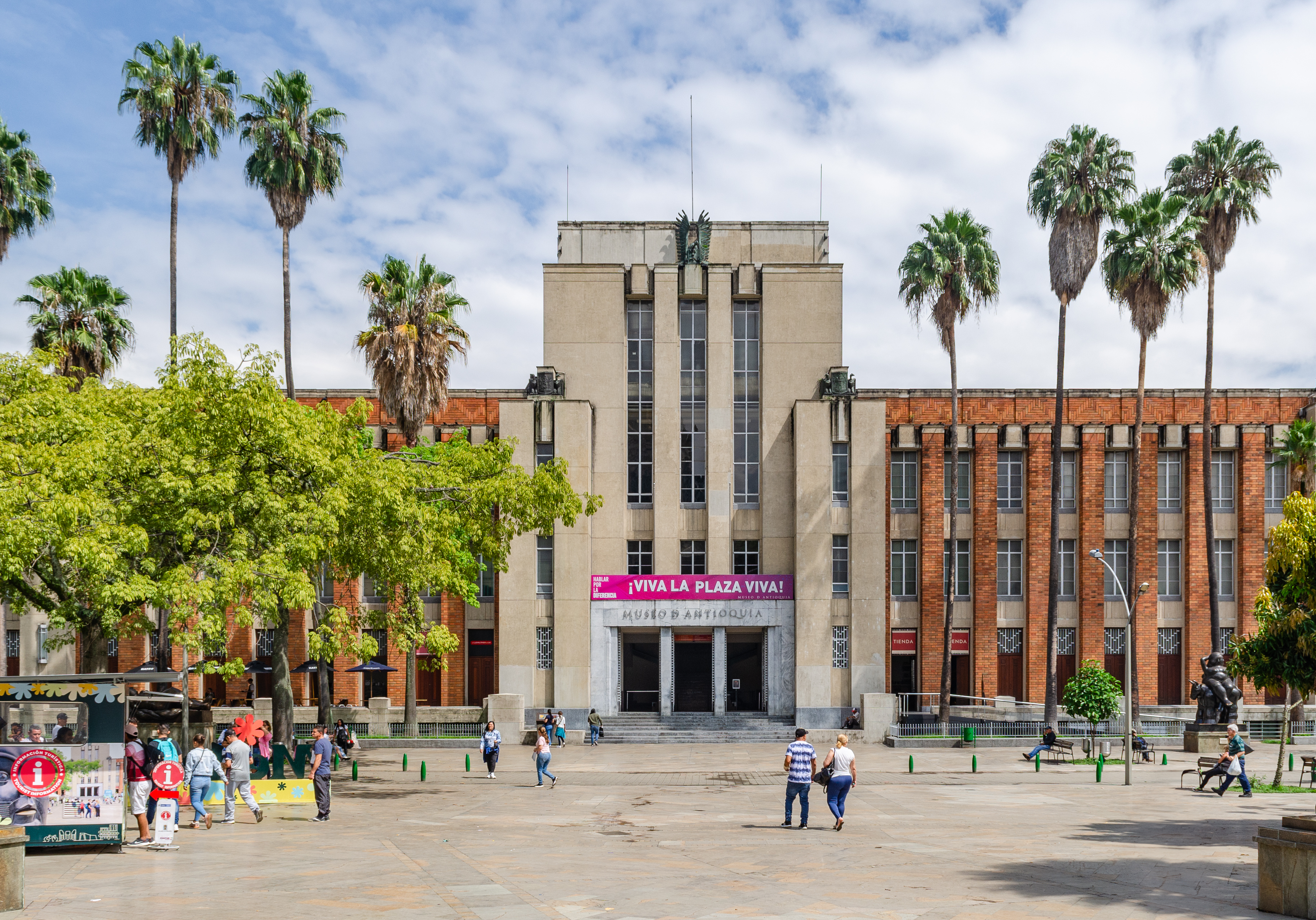
- Established: 1881
- Location: Carrera 52 # 52-43, Medellín, Colombia
- Director: María del Rosario Escobar
- Website: www.museodeantioquia.co

The Museum of Antioquia (Spanish: Museo de Antioquia) is an art museum in Medellín, Colombia. It houses a large collection of works by Medellín native Fernando Botero and Pedro Nel Gómez.

It was the first museum established in Antioquia department and the second in Colombia. The museum is located in the center of Medellín on the Botero Plaza near the Berrío Park metro station.

== History ==
In 1881, a group, including Manuel Uribe Ángel, Antonio José Restrepo and Martin Gómez, established the Zea Museum in honor of Francisco Antonio Zea at the Library of the Sovereign State of Antioquia. The first collection contained books and historical and artistic artifacts of its founders. Uribe Angel donated his collection with the condition that he be the first director of the museum. There was also a library as part of the museum.

The history of the department was represented in documents, weapons, flags and other items from the time of Colombian independence to the Thousand Days' War. The collection also contained pre-Columbian pieces, rocks, minerals, and coins.

The library had thousands of volumes related to history, art and science, and a compilation of the first newspapers in the country. In 1886, the Constitution was reformed and the status of Antioquia as a sovereign state changed to the status it has today as a department. As a result, entities such as the museum had to depend on the central government and with the governors. The museum coninuted depending on the Administration Department.

The museum closed to become the palace of Rafael Uribe Uribe, the governor of Antioquia. Part of the collection was put in storage and the other part was sent to the University of Antioquio and the Historical Academy of Antioquia.

In 1946, Teresa Santamaria de Gonzalez and Joaquin Jaramillo Sierra, of the Honor Society for the Betterment of Medellín were concerned that the city did not have a representative museum. They proposed reopening the museum and looked for someone who could protect the museum from government control or closure. So they established the museum as a private non-profit entity.

In 1953, the museum received legal status, and it finally opened in 1955 in the Casa de la Moneda (Coin House), itself a former aguardiente factory. (The place is now Ala Experimental, next to the Church of the Veracruz.) The location was facilitated by the national bank, and the city of Medellín gave the building for the exclusive use of the museum.

In 1977, the museum changed its name to the Francisco Antonio Zea Museum of Art of Medellín. The name was changed to avoid confusion: tourists did not understand the significance of Zea and the locals confused the museum with the Cera (wax) museum.

In 1978, the artist Fernando Botero made his first donation of his works to the museum. Then it was proposed that the name be changed to the Museum of Antioquia. The change was accepted by the Governor of Antioquia.

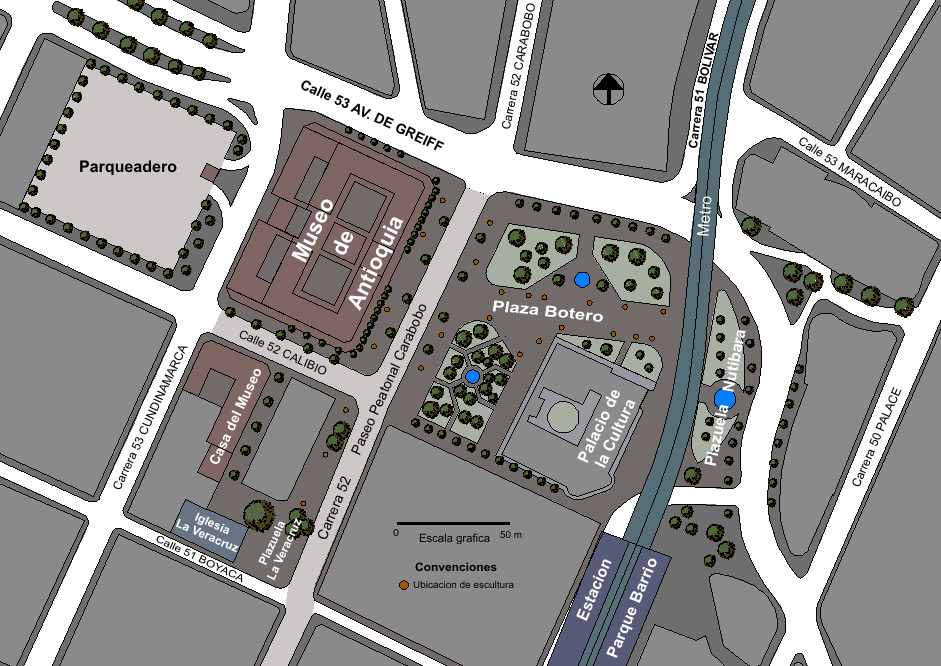
The Museum of Antioquia and Botero Plaza

In 1997, a renovation process started. At this time, the museum was in economic distress and the number of annual visitors was low.

=== Museo 360 ===
Since 2016, with the arrival of María del Rosario Escobar as the director, the Museum of Antioquia has undertaken the project Museo 360 seeking to outline the museum as a space for encounters and reflections that "recognize the reality of the city, instead of hiding it." Museo 360 aims to "settle historical debts of exclusion, discrimination" and to overcome "the inability to understand the other, amid the fear of being different." According to Escobar, the museum's mission is to "review history and its stories, and create new stories that are inclusive and allow us to understand that the problems of the city and its protagonists exist." This institutional approach seeks to provoke reflections on the historical paths that have led to the present of a society, and the role that cultural institutions play in these processes.

Accordingly, the curatorial strategy of the permanent galleries invites visitors to inquire about the role of art history and museums in the reinforcement of exclusionary social constructs. Another example of the museum's new approach is the artistic residency project of artist Nadia Granados who, with curator Carolina Chacón and a group of sex workers based in downtown Medellín, developed the award-winning cabaret/performance Nadie sabe quién soy yo (No one knows who I am) in 2017. From then on, the performers funded the group Las Guerreras del Centro (Downtown Warriors), a collective to highlight the lives and stories of sex workers through artistic performances, knitting circles and other community actions.

Nadie sabe quién soy yo was the beginning of a series of curatorial and educational collaborations between Las Guerreras del Centro and the Museum of Antioquia. Such collaborative projects constitute destigmatizing and empowering critical museology practices that generate new spaces for exchanges and social dialogues within and outside of the museum. These spaces emerge from the museum, forge links beyond museum walls, and drastically transform the museum's relationship with its social environment.

== See also ==
- Pedro Nel Gómez
