= La Estrella, Antioquia =

- Municipality and town
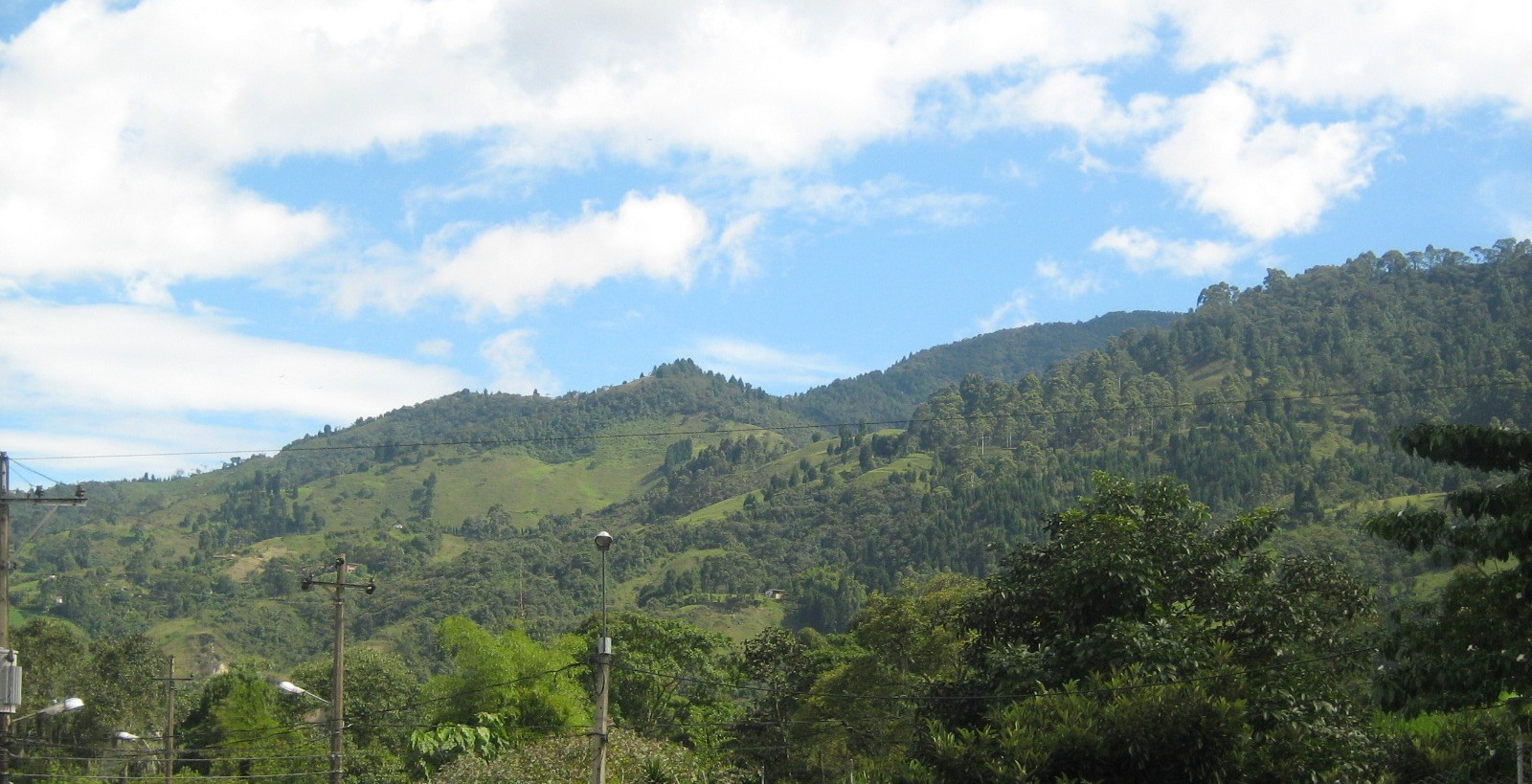

- Flag Coat of arms

- Location of the municipality and town of La Estrella, Antioquia in the Antioquia Department of Colombia

- Location in Colombia
- Coordinates: 6°10′0″N 75°40′0″W
- Country: Colombia
- Department: Antioquia Department

Area
  - Municipality and town: 36.63 km^{2} (14.14 sq mi)
  - Urban: 6.65 km^{2} (2.57 sq mi)

Population (2020 est.)
  - Municipality and town: 75,517
  - Density: 2,062/km^{2} (5,340/sq mi)
  - Urban: 65,582
  - Urban density: 9,860/km^{2} (25,500/sq mi)
- Time zone: UTC-5 (Colombia Standard Time)

La Estrella is a town and municipality in Antioquia Department, Colombia. La Estrella is part of The Metropolitan Area of the Aburrá Valley. The population was estimated to be 75,517 in 2020.
