= Poblado station =

Medellín metro station

Poblado Estación Poblado
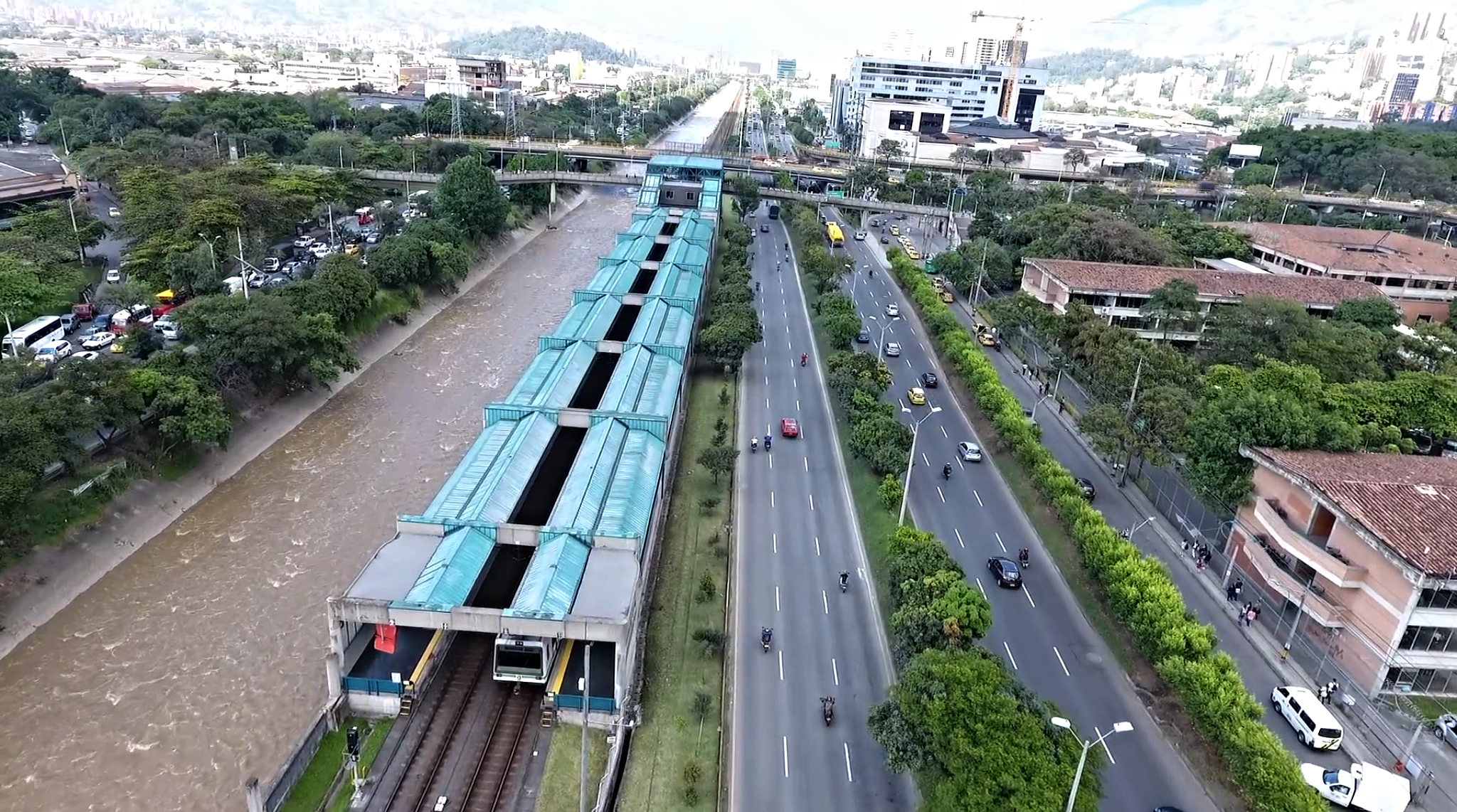

General information
- Location: El Poblado, Medellín; Colombia
- Coordinates: 6°12′44″N 75°34′41″W

History
- Opened: 30 November 1995; 30 years ago

Services
Preceding station	Medellín Metro	Following station
Industriales towards Niquía	Line A	Aguacatala towards La Estrella
Location

Poblado is a station on line A of the Medellín Metro from north to south. It is named after El Poblado, where it is located adjacent to the Monterrey shopping center. The station was opened on 30 November 1995 as the terminus of the inaugural section of Line A, from Niquía to Poblado. On 30 September 1996 the line was extended to Itagüí.
