= La Estrella station =

Medellín metro station

Coordinates: 6.1527°N 75.6266°W

La Estrella Estación La Estrella
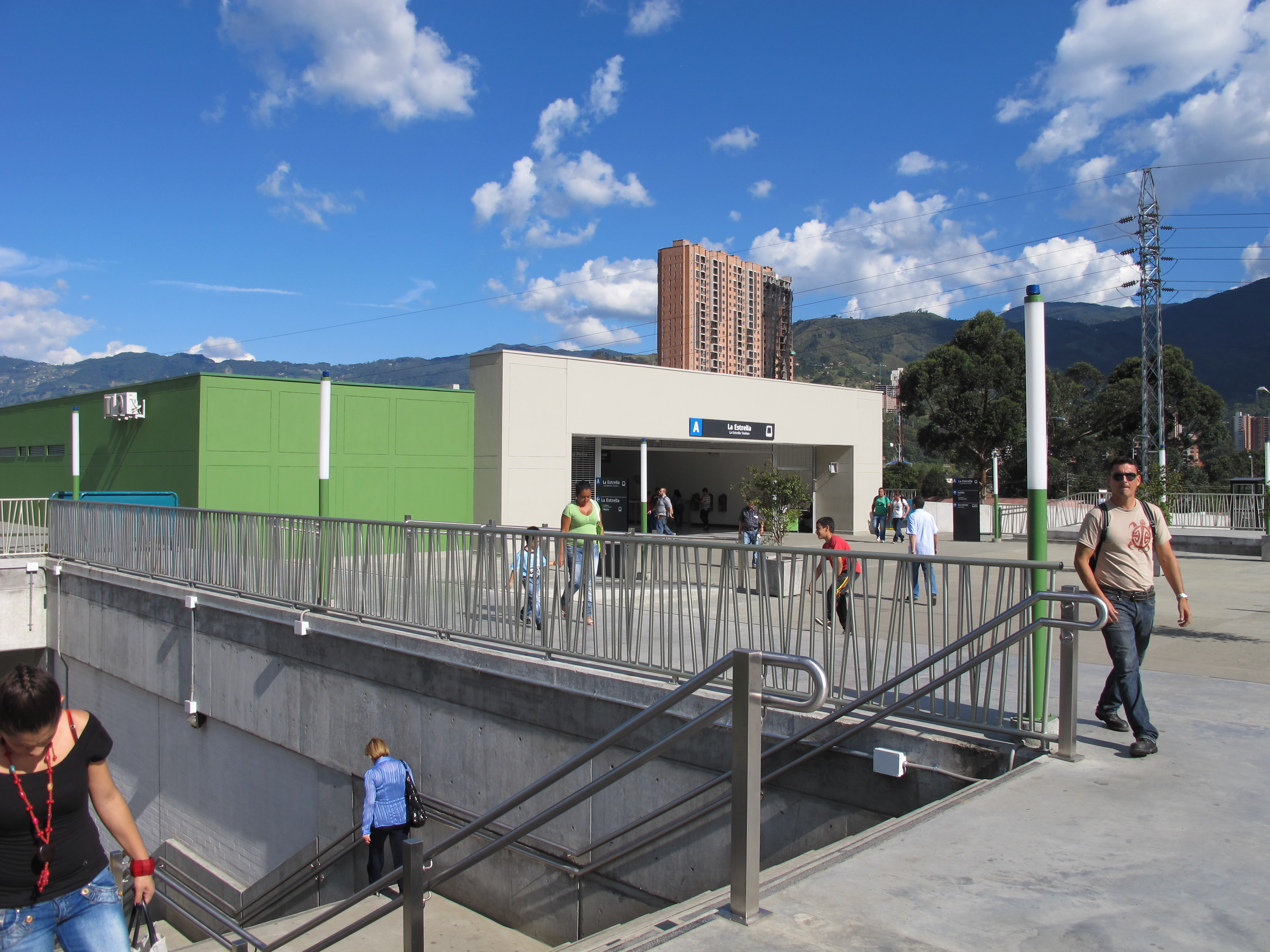
- Estación La Estrella

General information
- Location: La Estrella, Antioquia; Colombia

History
- Opened: 17 September 2012; 13 years ago

Services
Preceding station	Medellín Metro	Following station
Sabaneta towards Niquía	Line A	Terminus
Location

La Estrella (English: "The Star"), also known as Ancón, is a station on line A of the Medellín Metro going south. It is located in the La Estrella municipality of Colombia. It was inaugurated on 17 September 2012 as part of the extension of the line from Itagüí in a ceremony attended by the current president of Colombia, Juan Manuel Santos; Governor of Antioquia, Sergio Fajardo; and Medellin Mayor Aníbal Gaviria.

This station was designed as part of the larger project "Centrality South" for the metropolitan area to meet the needs of the inhabitants of southern Valle de Aburrá. Currently, it is the only semi-underground station.
