= Niquía station =

Medellín metro station

Niquía Station Estación Niquía
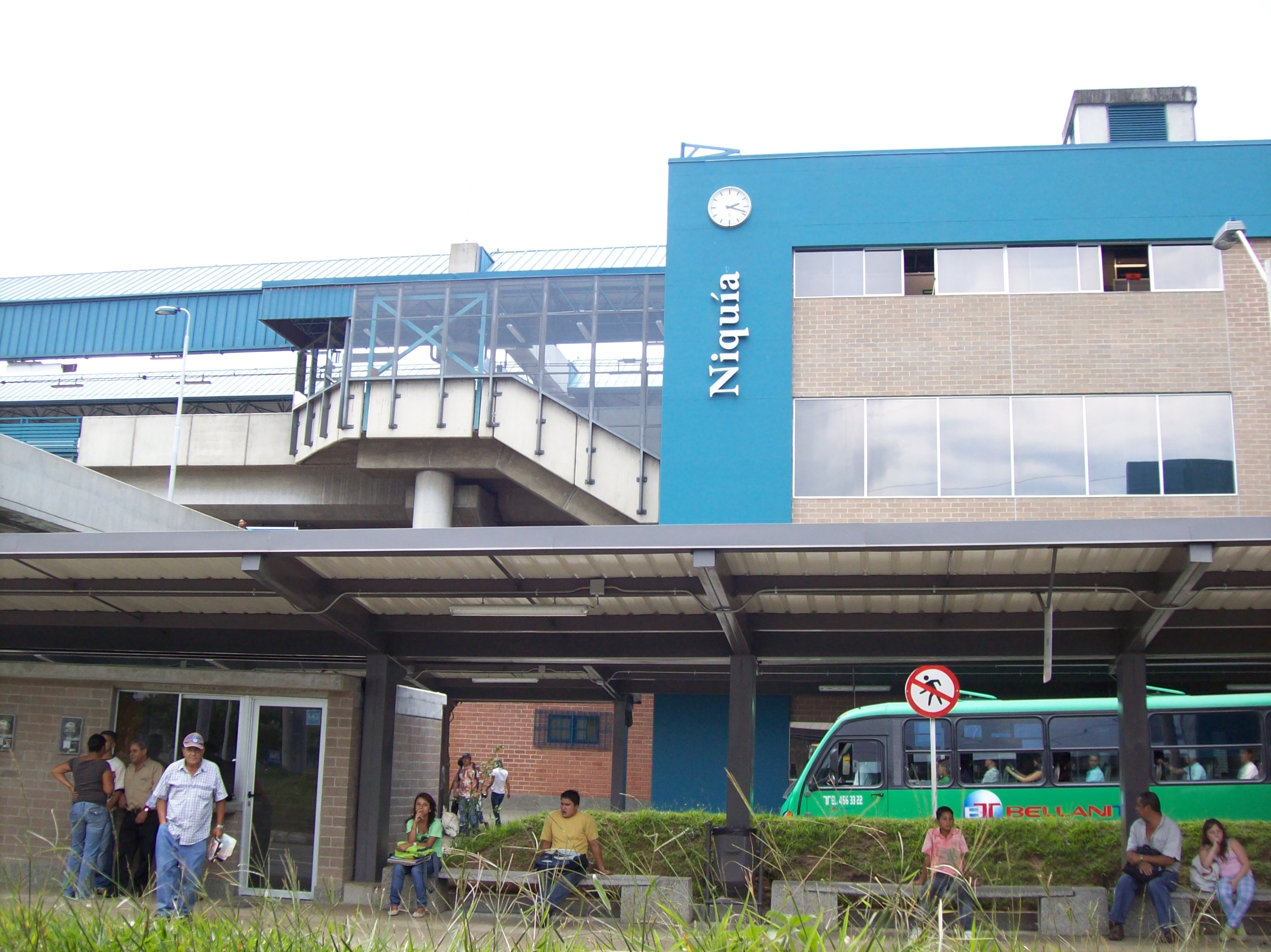

General information
- Location: Diagonal 50 A # 37 – 01, Bello; Colombia
- Coordinates: 6°20′16″N 75°32′40″W
- Platforms: 2 side platforms
- Tracks: 2

Construction
- Structure type: elevated

History
- Opened: 30 November 1995; 30 years ago

Services
Preceding station	Medellín Metro	Following station
Terminus	Line A	Bello towards La Estrella
Location

Niquía is the first station on the Medellín Metro from north to south on line A. It is located in Bello, the second most populous city in the metropolitan area, after Medellín. The station was opened on 30 November 1995 as part of the inaugural section of line A, from Niquía to Poblado.
