= Bicycle-sharing system =

Short-time bicycle rental service

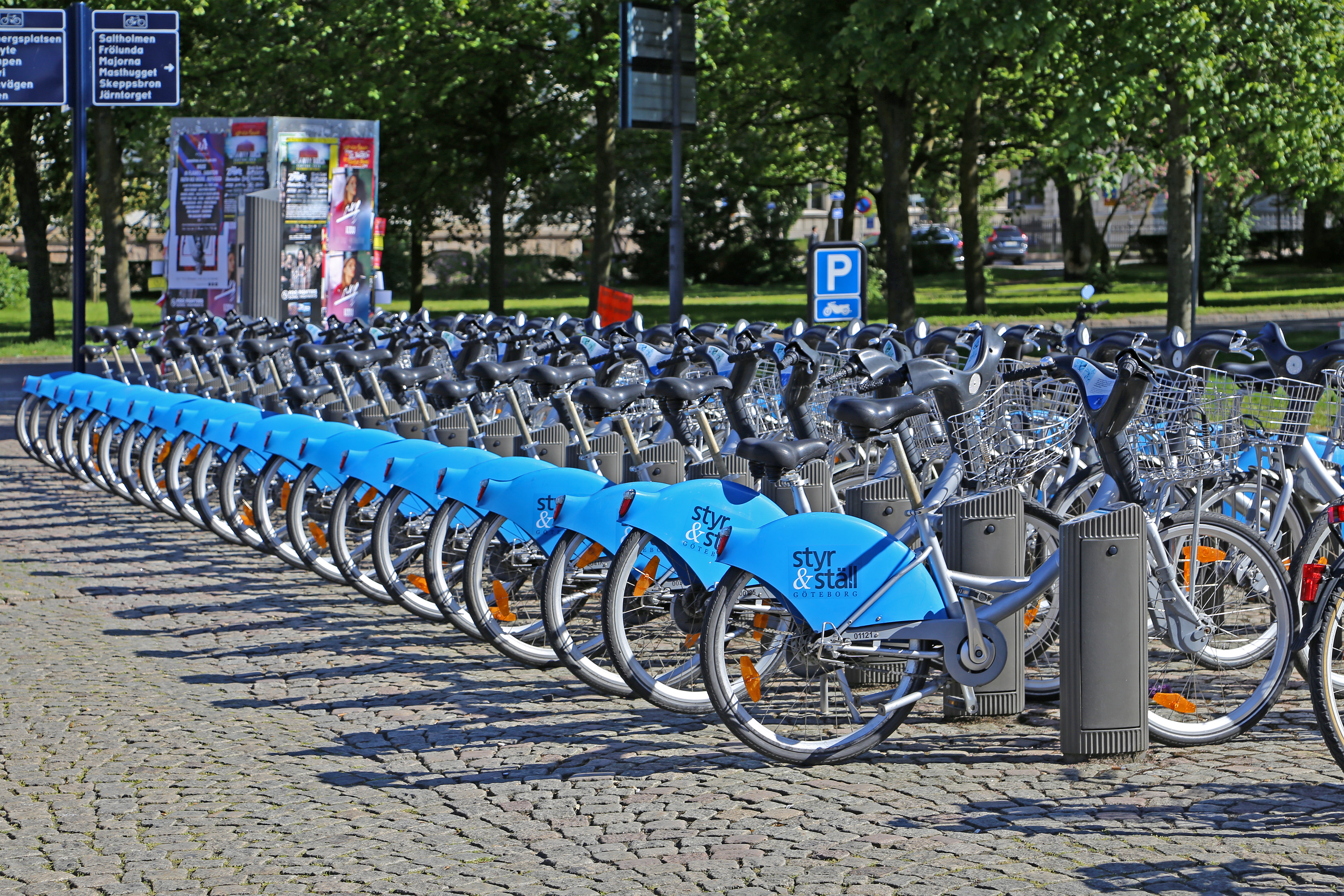
Docked bicycles in Gothenburg, Sweden

A bicycle-sharing system, bike share program, public bicycle scheme, or public bike share (PBS) scheme, is a shared transport service in which bicycles or electric bicycles are available for shared short-term use by individuals at low cost.

These systems are designed to provide an affordable, flexible, and environmentally friendly mode of transport, often serving as a "first- and last-mile" connection to public transport and helping to reduce traffic congestion and emissions.

Modern bicycle-sharing systems typically operate as either docked networks, where bicycles are rented from and returned to fixed stations, or dockless systems, which use mobile technology and GPS to enable more flexible pick-up and drop-off. Advances in technology since the 2000s have enabled rapid global expansion, with thousands of systems now operating in cities worldwide.

Bicycle-sharing systems originated in grassroot efforts in Europe in the mid-1960s. By 2022, bike share schemes were offered in approximately 3,000 cities worldwide, including Dubai, New York, Paris, Mexico City, Montreal and Barcelona. Today bike-share systems have become an integral part of urban mobility strategies in some cities, offering social, environmental, and health benefits while complementing public transportation networks. They can improve accessibility and equity in urban transport, reduce greenhouse gas emissions and air pollution, and promote physical activity, contributing to better public health outcomes.

Bicycle-sharing systems have also faced challenges, including bicycle theft and vandalism, uneven distribution of bikes, high operational and maintenance cost, and regulatory concerns over urban clutter, particularly with dockless schemes.

== History ==
The earliest notable community bicycle program was the White Bicycle Plan (Dutch: Wittefietsenplan) in Amsterdam, initiated in the summer of 1965 by Luud Schimmelpennink in association with the Provo movement. The group painted fifty bicycles white and placed them in various locations around the city, which were intended to be used freely by members of the public for one-time trips. The scheme was one of a number of "White Plans" proposed by the movement, which comprised various strategies for improving livability or transportation in Amsterdam.

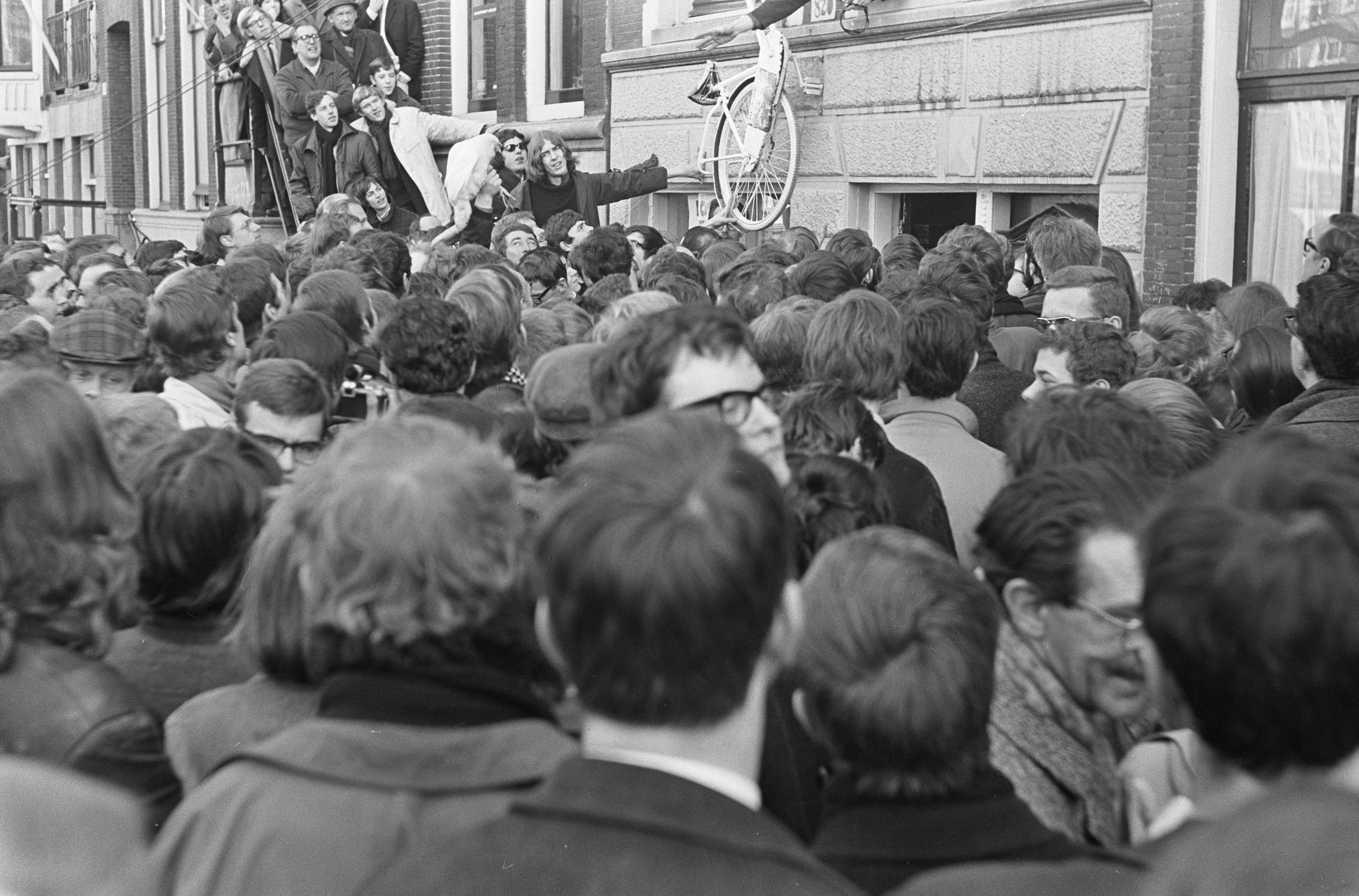
White bicycle as an emblem of the Wittefietsenplan movement

Within a month, most of the bicycles had been stolen and the rest were found in nearby canals. Similar programs still exist elsewhere in the Netherlands, e.g., at Hoge Veluwe National Park, where a set of bicycles may be used freely within the park. Years later, Schimmelpennink admitted that "the Sixties experiment never existed in the way people believe" and that "no more than about ten bikes" had been put out on the street "as a suggestion of the bigger idea." As the police had temporarily confiscated all of the White Bicycles within a day of their release to the public, the White Bicycle experiment had actually lasted less than one month.

Ernest Callenbach's utopian novel Ecotopia (1975) illustrates the idea. In his depiction of a society that does not use fossil fuels, Callenbach described a bicycle sharing system which is available to inhabitants as an integrated part of a wider public transportation system.

One of the first community bicycle projects in the United States was started in Portland, Oregon in 1994 by civic and environmental activists Tom O'Keefe, Joe Keating and Steve Gunther. Similarly to the White Bicycle Plan, Portland's Yellow Bike Project released a number of bicycles to the streets for unrestricted use. While successful in terms of publicity, the programme proved unsustainable due to theft and vandalism of the bicycles. The Yellow Bike Project was eventually terminated, and replaced with the Create A Commuter (CAC) program, which provides free secondhand bicycles to low-income individuals as a means to commute to work or attend job training courses.

In 1995, the ByCylken system was introduced in Copenhagen by Morten Sadolin and Ole Wessung, initially with a fleet of 300 bicycles. Riders paid a refundable deposit at one of 100 special locking bike stands (similar in principle to coin-deposit shopping carts), then had unlimited use of the bike within a specified 'city bike zone'. The idea was developed after both founders were victims of bicycle theft one night in 1989. ByCylken was the first large-scale urban bike share program to feature specially designed bikes with parts that could not be used on other bikes.

Bike sharing programs later gravitated to the use of smart cards to prevent theft. One of the first such 'smart bike' programs was the Grippa bike storage rack system used in Portsmouth (UK)'s Bikeabout system. The Bikeabout scheme was launched in October 1995 by the University of Portsmouth as part of its Green Transport Plan in an effort to cut car travel by staff and students between campus sites. Funded in part by the EU's ENTRANCE (Note: Acronym for the ENergy savings in TRANsport through innovation in the Cities of Europe programme) program, the Bikeabout scheme was a "smart card" fully automated system. For a small fee, users were issued magnetic striped 'smart cards' readable at a covered 'bike store' kiosk, unlocking the bike from its storage rack. Station-located CCTV cameras limited vandalism. On arrival at the destination station, the smart card unlocked cycle rack and recorded the bike's return, registering if the bike was returned with damage or if the rental time exceeded a three-hour maximum. Implemented with an original budget of approximately £200,000, the Portsmouth Bikeabout scheme was never very successful in terms of rider usage, in part due to the limited number of bike kiosks and hours of operation. Seasonal weather restrictions and concerns over unjustified charges for bike damage also imposed barriers to usage. The Bikeabout program was discontinued by the university in 1998 in favor of expanded minibus service; the total costs of the Bikeabout program were never disclosed.

The modern wave of electronically locked bikes took off in France. In 1998 the city of Rennes launched Velo a la cart using a magnetic card to release bicycles, which was operated by Clear Channel. Then the French advertising company, JCDecaux begain launching larger systems in Vienna (2003), Lyon (2005), and Paris (2007), among others. Vélib', the Paris system captured the attention of the world and catalyzed steep growth in bikesharing systems around Europe, Asia, South America, and North America. In North America, the BIXI project (a portmanteau of the French "bicyclette" and "taxi" or "bicyle taxi") launched by the City of Montreal in 2009. It garnered a sizable ridership and the city created the Public Bike System Company to begin selling the underlying infrastructure to several other cities, including Washington D.C.'s Capital Bikeshare (2010), New York City's Citi Bike (2013), and London's "Boris bikes (2010)". The PBSC was privatised in 2014 and was later acquired by Lyft in 2022. Separately in 2018, Lyft had acquired Motivate, an operator of many BIXI-based systems. Meanwhile, the original BIXI system has been operated directly by the City of Montreal since 2014.

Bike share technology has evolved over the course of decades, with programs in Asia in particular having grown exponentially. Of the world's 15 largest public bike share programs, 13 are in China; in 2012, the largest were in Wuhan and Hangzhou, with around 90,000 and 60,000 bikes respectively. By December 2016, roughly 1,000 cities worldwide had a bike-sharing program. Electric bikes have also been incorporated into sharing schemes.

In July 2020, Google Maps began including bike share systems in its route recommendations.

== Categorization ==
Bike-sharing systems have developed and evolved with society changes and technological improvements. The systems can be grouped into five categories or generations.

=== Staffed stations ===
==== Short-term checkout ====
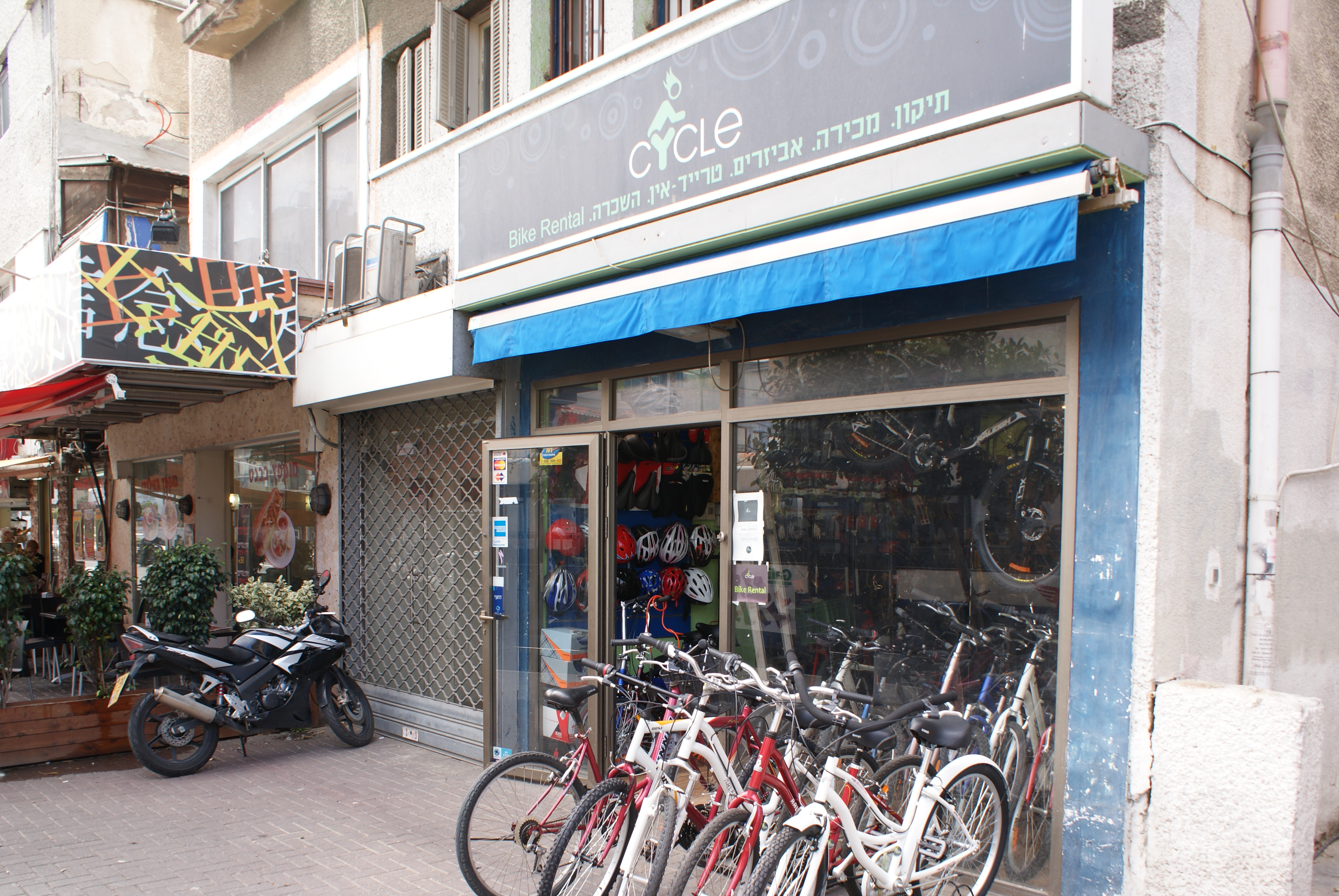
Bike rental store in Tel Aviv

Also known as bicycle rental, bike hire or zero generation. In this system a bicycle can be rented or borrowed from a location and returned to that location. These bicycle renting systems often cater to day-trippers or tourists. This system is also used by cycling schools for potential cyclists who do not have a bicycle. The locations or stations are not automated but are run by employees or volunteers.

Regional programs have been implemented where numerous renting locations are set up at railway stations and at local businesses (usually restaurants, museums and hotels) creating a network of locations where bicycles can be borrowed from and returned (e.g. ZweiRad FreiRad with at times 50 locations). In this kind of network for example a railway station master can allocate a bicycle to a user that then returns it at a different location, for example a hotel. Some such systems require paying a fee, and some do not. Usually the user will be registered or a deposit will be left by the renting facility. The EnCicla Bike Share System in Medellín on its inception in 2011 had 6 staffed locations. It later grew to 32 automatic and 19 staffed stations making it a hybrid between a zero generation and third generation system.

==== Long-term checkout ====
Sometimes known as bike library systems, these bicycles may be lent free of charge, for a refundable deposit, or for a small fee. A bicycle is checked out to one person who will typically keep it for several months, and is encouraged or obliged to lock it between uses. A disadvantage is a lower usage frequency, around three uses per day on average as compared to 2 to 15 uses per day typically experienced with other bike-sharing schemes. Advantages of long-term use include rider familiarity with the bicycle, and constant, instant readiness.

The bicycle can be checked out like a library book, a liability waiver can be collected at check-out, and the bike can be returned any time. For each trip, a Library Bike user can choose the bike instead of a car, thus lowering car usage. The long-term rental system generally results in fewer repair costs to the scheme administrator, as riders are incentivised to obtain minor maintenance in order to keep the bike in running order during the long rental period. Most of the long-term systems implemented to date are funded solely through charitable donations of second-hand bicycles, using unpaid volunteer labour to maintain and administer the bicycle fleet. While reducing or eliminating the need for public funding, such a scheme imposes an outer limit to program expansion. The Arcata Bike Library, in California, has loaned over 4000 bicycles using this system.

=== White bikes ===
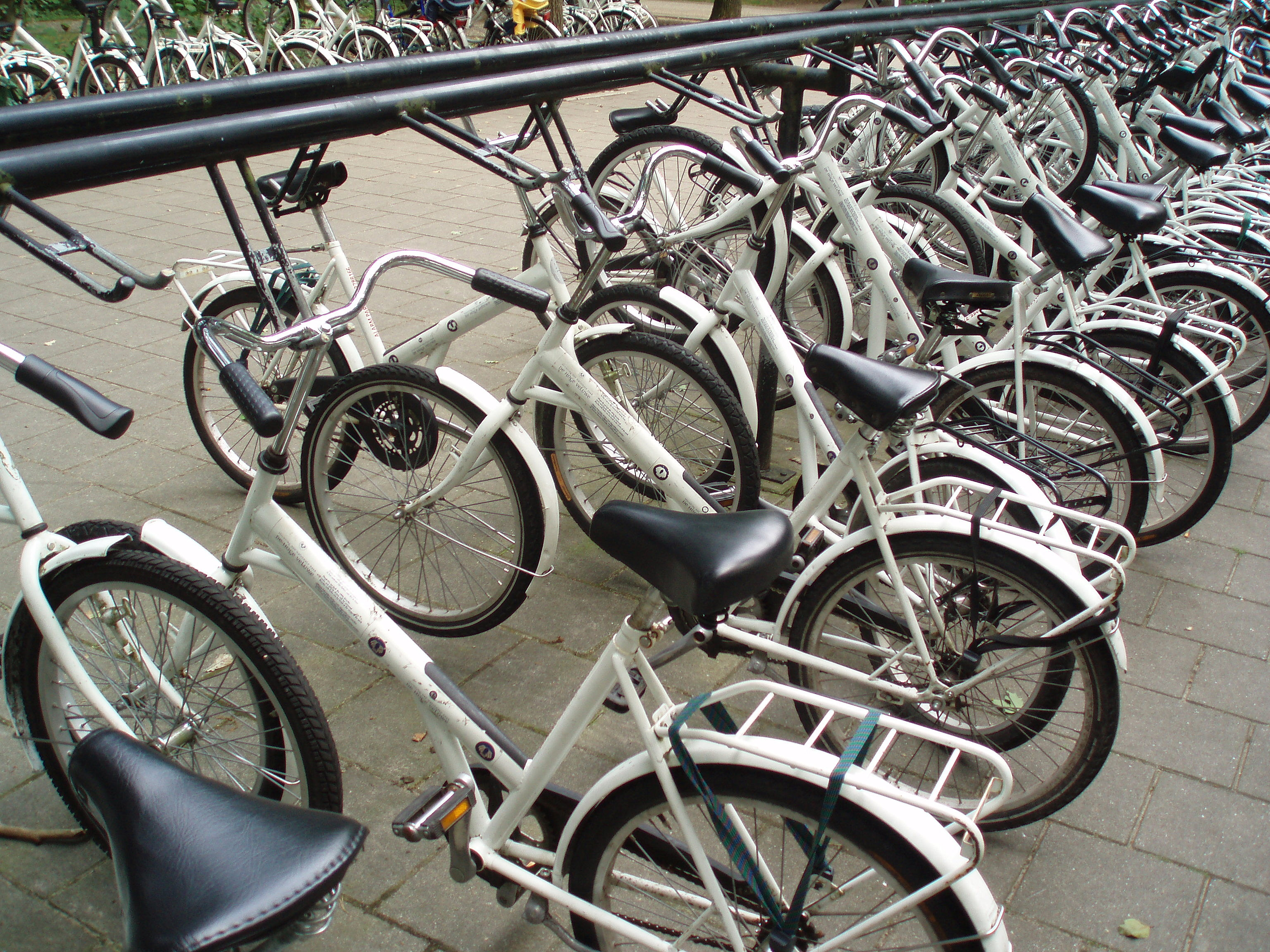
White bicycles for free use, in Hoge Veluwe National Park in Gelderland, the Netherlands

Also known as free bikes, unregulated or first generation. In this type of programme the bicycles are simply released into a city or given area for use by anyone. In some cases, such as a university campus, the bicycles are only designated for use within certain boundaries. Users are expected to leave the bike unlocked in a public area once they reach their destination. Depending on the quantity of bicycles in the system availability of such bicycles can suffer because the bikes are not required to be returned to a centralised station. Such a system can also suffer under distribution problems where many bicycles end up in a valley of a city but few are found on the hills of a city. Since parked and unlocked bikes may be taken by another user at any time, the original rider might have to find an alternative transport for the return trip. This system does away with the cost of having a person allocating a vehicle to a user and it is the system with the lowest hemmschwelle or psychological barrier for a potential user. However, bicycle sharing programs without locks, user identification, and security deposits have also historically suffered loss rates from theft and vandalism.

Many initiatives have been abandoned after a few years (e.g. Portland's Yellow Bike Project was abandoned after 3 years), while others have been successful for decades (e.g. Austin's Yellow Bike Project active since 1997). Most of these systems are based around volunteer work and are supported by municipalities. Bicycle repair and maintenance are done by a volunteer project or from the municipality contracted operator but also can be, and sometimes is, completed by individual users who find a defect on a free bike.

=== Coin deposit stations ===
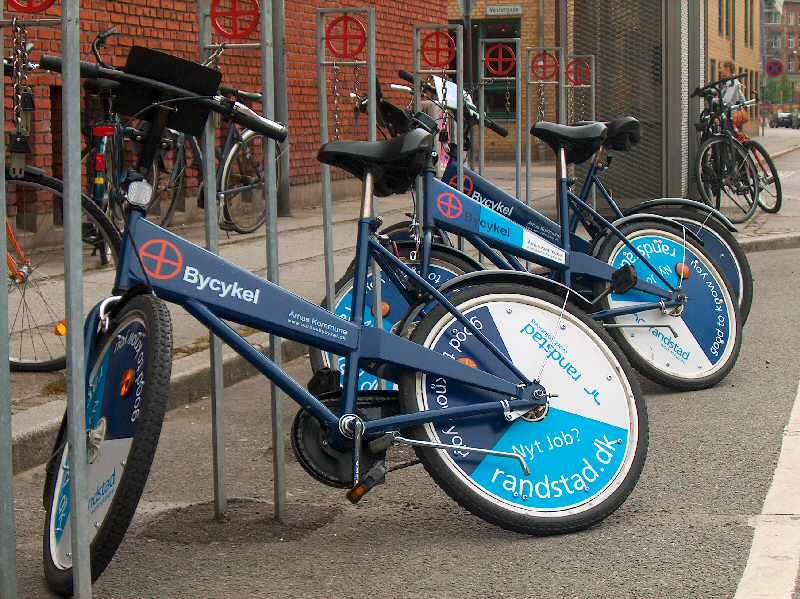
Three Bycykel returned at a coin deposit station Aarhus City Bikes

Also known as Bycykel or as second generation, this system was developed by Morten Sadolin and Ole Wessung of Copenhagen after both were victims of bicycle theft one night in 1989. They envisioned a freely available bicycle sharing system that would encourage spontaneous usage and also reduce bicycle theft. The bicycles, designed for intense utilitarian use with solid rubber tires and wheels with advertising plates, have a slot into which a shopping cart return key can be pushed. A coin (in most versions a 20 DKK or 2 EUR coin) needs to be pushed into the slot to unlock the bike from the station. The bicycle can thus be borrowed free of charge and for an unlimited time and the deposit coin can be retrieved by returning the bicycle to a station again. Since the deposit is a fraction of the bike's cost, and user is not registered this can be vulnerable to theft and vandalism. However, the distinct Bycykel design, well known to the public and to the law authorities does deter misuse to a degree. Implemented systems usually have a zone or area where it is allowed to drive in.

The first coin deposit (small) systems were launched in 1991 in Farsø and Grenå, Denmark, and in 1993 in Nakskov, Denmark with 26 bikes and 4 stations. In 1995 the first large-scale 800 bike strong second generation bike-sharing program was launched in Copenhagen as Bycyklen. The system was further introduced in Helsinki (2000–2010) and Vienna in (2002) and in Aarhus 2003.

=== Automated stations ===
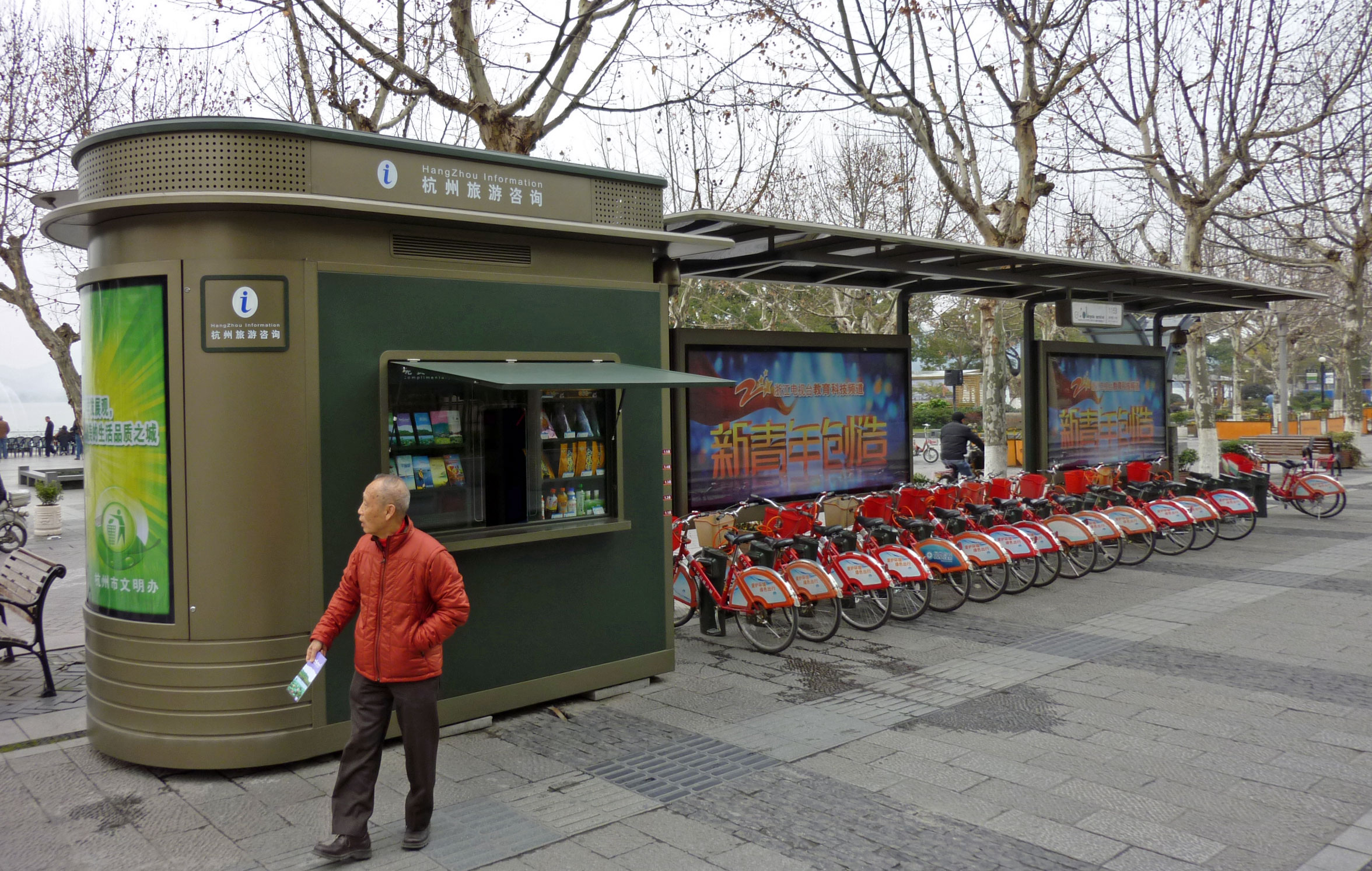
Hangzhou Public Bicycle system in China, formerly the largest bicycle sharing system in the world

Also known as docking stations bicycle-sharing, or membership bicycles or third generation consist of bicycles that can be borrowed or rented from an automated station or "docking stations" or "docks" and can be returned at another station belonging to the same system. The docking stations are special bike racks that lock the bike, and only release it by computer control. Individuals registered with the program identify themselves with their membership card (or by a smart card, via cell phone, or other methods) at any of the hubs to check out a bicycle for a short period of time, usually three hours or less. In many schemes the first half-hour is free. In recent years, in an effort to reduce losses from theft and vandalism, many bike-sharing schemes now require a user to provide a monetary deposit or other security, or to become a paid subscriber. The individual is responsible for any damage or loss until the bike is returned to another hub and checked in. Some cities allow to use the same card as for bus and rail transport to unlock the bicycles.

This system was developed as Public Velo by Hellmut Slachta and Paul Brandstätter from 1990 to 1992, and first implemented in 1996 by the University of Portsmouth and Portsmouth City Council as Bikeabout with a magnetic card used by the students and on 6 June 1998 in Rennes as LE vélo STAR, a public city network with 200 bikes, 25 stations and electronic identification of the bikes or in Oslo in 2001. The smart card contactless technology was experimented in Vienna (Citybike Wien) and implemented at a large scale in 2005 in Lyon (Vélo'v) and in 2007 in Paris (Vélib'). Since then over 1000 bicycle sharing system of this generation have been launched. The countries with the most dock based systems are Spain (132), Italy (104), and China (79). As of June 2014, public bike share systems were available in 50 countries on five continents, including 712 cities, operating approximately 806,200 bicycles at 37,500 stations. As of May 2011, the Wuhan and Hangzhou Public Bicycle bike-share systems in China were the largest in the world, with around 90,000 and 60,000 bicycles respectively. By 2013, China had a combined fleet of 650,000 public bikes.

This bicycle-sharing system saves the labour costs of staffed stations (zero generation), reduces vandalism and theft compared to first and second generation systems by registering users but requires a higher investment for infrastructure compared to fourth generation dockless bikes. Third generation systems also allow adapting docking stations as recharging stations for E-bike sharing.

=== Dockless bikes ===
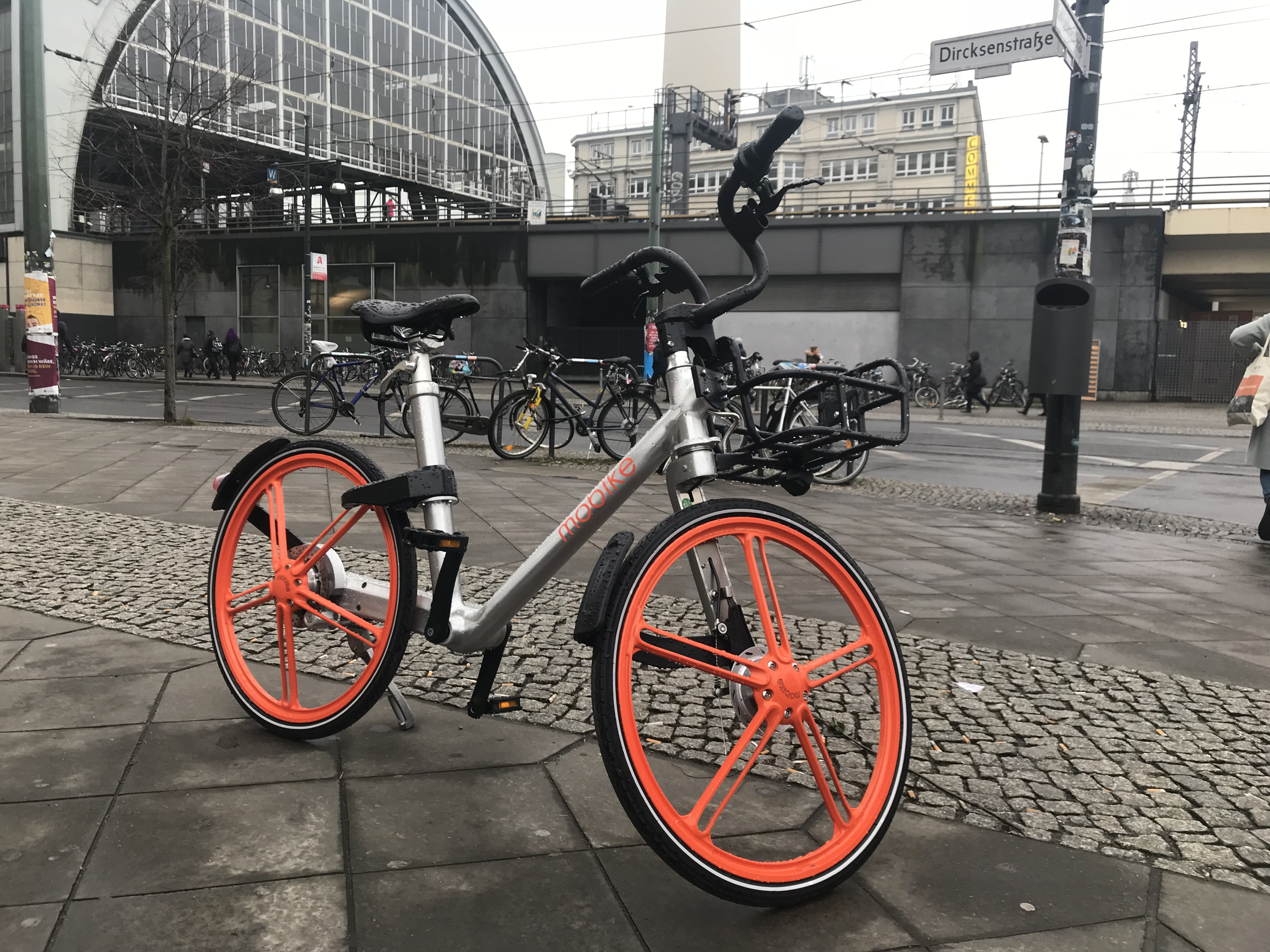
A dockless bike from Mobike, the world's largest operator, with an electronic lock by the rear wheel

Also known as Call a Bike, free floating bike or fourth generation, the dockless bike hire systems consist of a bicycle with a lock that is usually integrated onto the frame and does not require a docking station. The earliest versions of this system consisted of for-rent-bicycles that were locked with combination locks and that could be unlocked by a registered user by calling the vendor to receive the combination to unlock the bicycle. The user would then call the vendor a second time to communicate where the bicycle had been parked and locked. This system was further developed by Deutsche Bahn in 1998 to incorporate a digital authentication codes (that changes) to automatically lock and unlock bikes. Deutsche Bahn launched Call a Bike in 2000, enabling users to unlock via SMS or telephone call, and more recently with an app.

Recent technological improvements have enabled a rapid increase of this type of "dockless" bicycle-sharing system. Modern dockless bikes are equipped with a GPS tracking unit for location tracking and a cellular modem for communication. This onboard telematics device allows the bicycle to be located by users via a smartphone app. When a user rents the bike, the app sends a command through a central server to the device on the bike, which then unlocks its integrated wheel lock. The device also collects telemetry data, such as distance traveled, for automated billing. This entire process is a key part of digitalization for shared mobility operators.

However, the rapid growth vastly outpaced immediate demand and overwhelmed Chinese cities, where infrastructure and regulations were not prepared to handle a sudden flood of millions of shared bicycles.

Not needing docking stations that may require city planning and building permissions, the system spread rapidly on a global scale. At times dockless bike-sharing systems have been criticized as rogue systems instituted without respect for local authorities. In many cities entrepreneurial companies have independently introduced this system, despite a lack of adequate parking facilities. City officials lack regulation experience for this mode of transportation and social habits have not developed either. In some jurisdictions, authorities have confiscated "rogue" dockless bicycles that are improperly parked for potentially blocking pedestrian traffic on sidewalks and in other cases new laws have been introduced to regulate the shared bikes.

In some cities Deutsche Bahn's Call a Bike has Call a Bike fix system, which has fixed docking stations versus the flex dockless version, some systems are combined into a hybrid of third and fourth generation systems. Some Nextbike systems are also a 3rd and 4th generation hybrid. With the arrival of dockless bike shares, there were in 2017 over 70 private dockless bikeshares operating a combined fleet of 16 million share bikes according to estimates of Ministry of Transport of China. Beijing alone has 2.35 million share bikes from 15 companies.

In the United States, many major metropolitan areas are experimenting with dockless bikeshare systems, which have been popular with commuters but subject to complaints about illegal parking.

== Integration with other transport systems ==
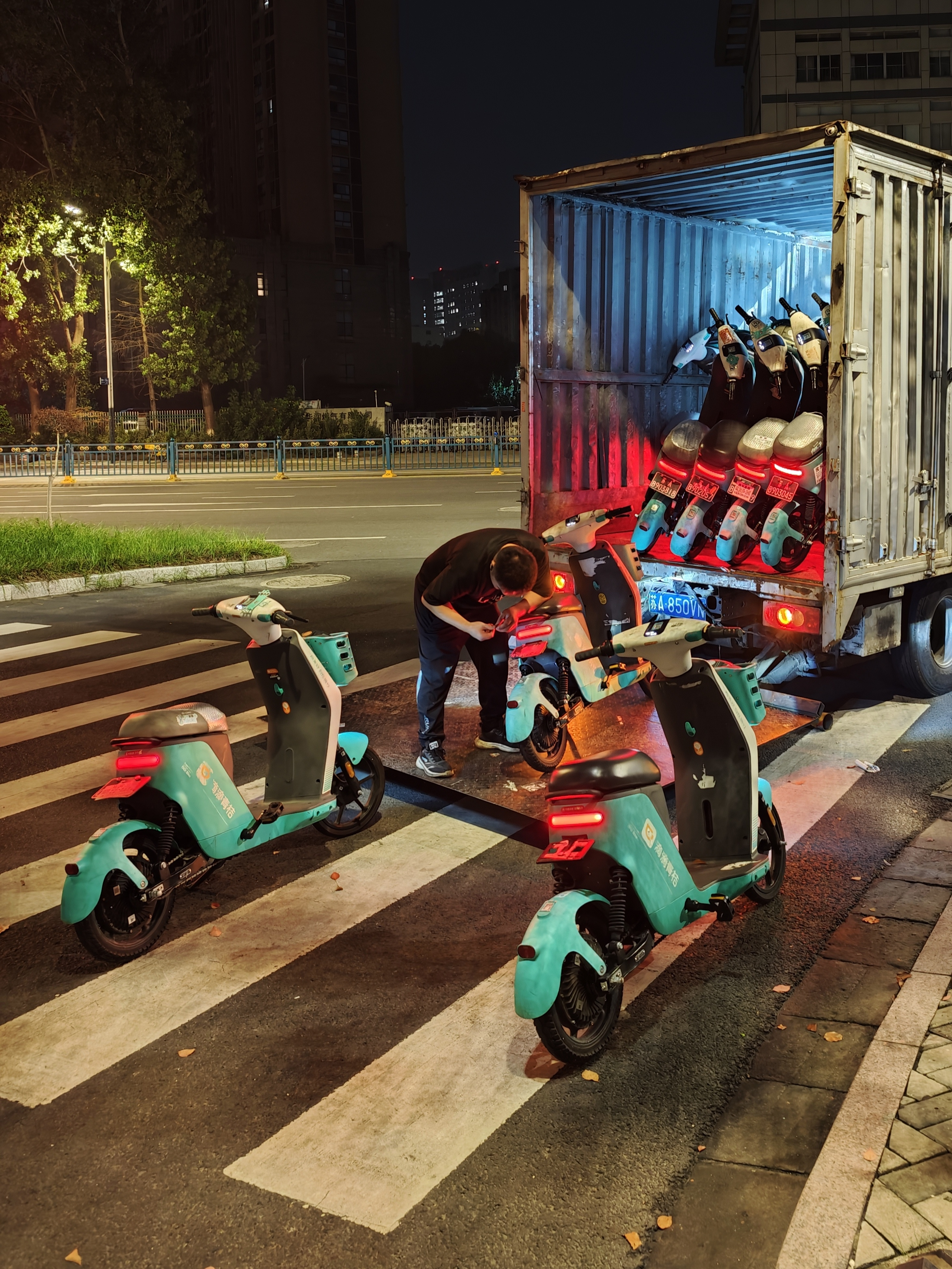
Shared-use electric bicycles being maintained by company staff at late night

=== Integration with public transport ===
In many cities over the world, bike sharing system is connected to other public transportation. It is usually hoped to complement the shortcomings in the greater public transport system. Sometimes, in order to encourage residents to use public transport system, local government will give discount on transferring between bike sharing system and other public transports.

In some national-level programme that combines a typical rental system with several of the above system types, a passenger railway operator or infrastructure manager partners with a national cycling organisation and others to create a system closely connected with public transport. These programmes usually allow for a longer rental time of up to 24 or 48 hours, as well as tourists and round trips. In some German cities the national rail company offers a bike rental service called Call a Bike.

In Guangzhou, China, the privately operated Guangzhou Bus Rapid Transit system includes cycle lanes, and a public bicycle system. In some cases, like Santander Cycles in London, the bicycle sharing system is owned by the public transport authority itself. In other cases, like YouBike in Taipei, Taiwan, the bicycle sharing system is built by a private company partner with the public transport sector through BOT mode. To be more specific in this case, it is offered by the Taipei City Department of Transportation in a BOT collaboration with local manufacturer Giant Bicycles.

==== Medellín, Colombia ====
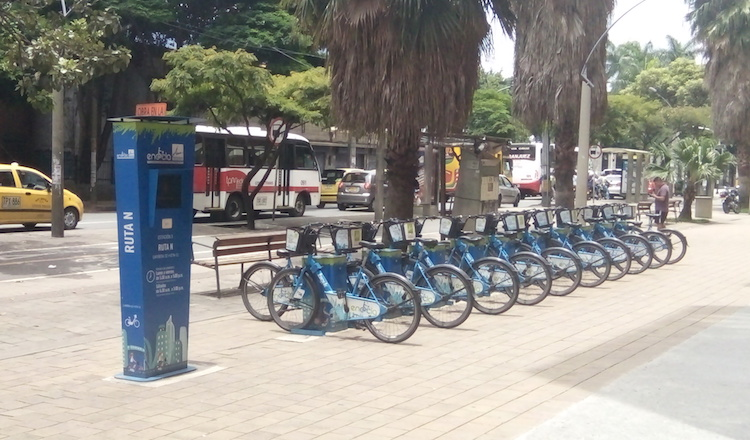
A station of EnCicla in Medellín

The city of Medellín in Colombia is home to 3.4 million inhabitants in 173 km^{2} and has long faced infrastructural mobility challenges. EnCicla is a bike sharing system in the city of Medellín (Colombia, South America). The bike sharing system is connected to other modes of transportation, such as the Metro.

In 2010, three EAFIT students (Lina Marcela López, José Agusto Ocampo, and Felipe Gutiérrez) developed the idea of the EnCicla bike sharing system as part of their final project. The implementation of the system was decided in operation in August 2012, with the subsequent pilot program confirming its prospects for success. EAFIT advocated for the city to lead the system. This was implemented accordingly, resulting in the inclusion of EnCicla in the agenda of the city of Medellín and its incorporation into the transportation network. In this regard, EnCicla consists of a mixture of shared, as well as separated, bike lanes on the roadway. In the first 3 months after the official launch, 15,700 bicycle rentals took place, with usage picking up sharply in subsequent months and years. In Medellín, an attempt was made to solve the demand problem with statistical analysis using historical data. The result of this analysis was the establishment of a heterogeneous bicycle fleet, with a minimum and maximum number for each station.

In total, in Medellín there exist more than 90 stations in 7 zones, with 13 connected to other transport systems. Since inception, more than 13 million bicycles have been rented by the approximately 9,100 active members. In this context, the most frequently used stations are located in the western zone, near universities and colleges. These stations are located near train stations, which means that there is a high volume of people. To use EnCicla, citizens must register on the official website. In general, the system can be used free of charge by anyone 16 years of age or older and is available from 5:30-22:00 during the week and from 6:30-21:00 on Saturdays. Local residents must register through EnCicla's website prior to use, and tourists have the option of renting a bicycle using their passport.

The establishment of EnCicla in recent years has helped relieve the complex transportation system in Medelin. However, the repositioning of bicycles at stations results in increased CO_{2} emissions, which run counter to the environmental importance of the project. In parallel, various activities have been carried out to promote the establishment of the system. These include a program that gives people over 8 years of age the opportunity to improve their knowledge and skills in cycling.

==== Taipei Metropolitan Area, Taiwan ====
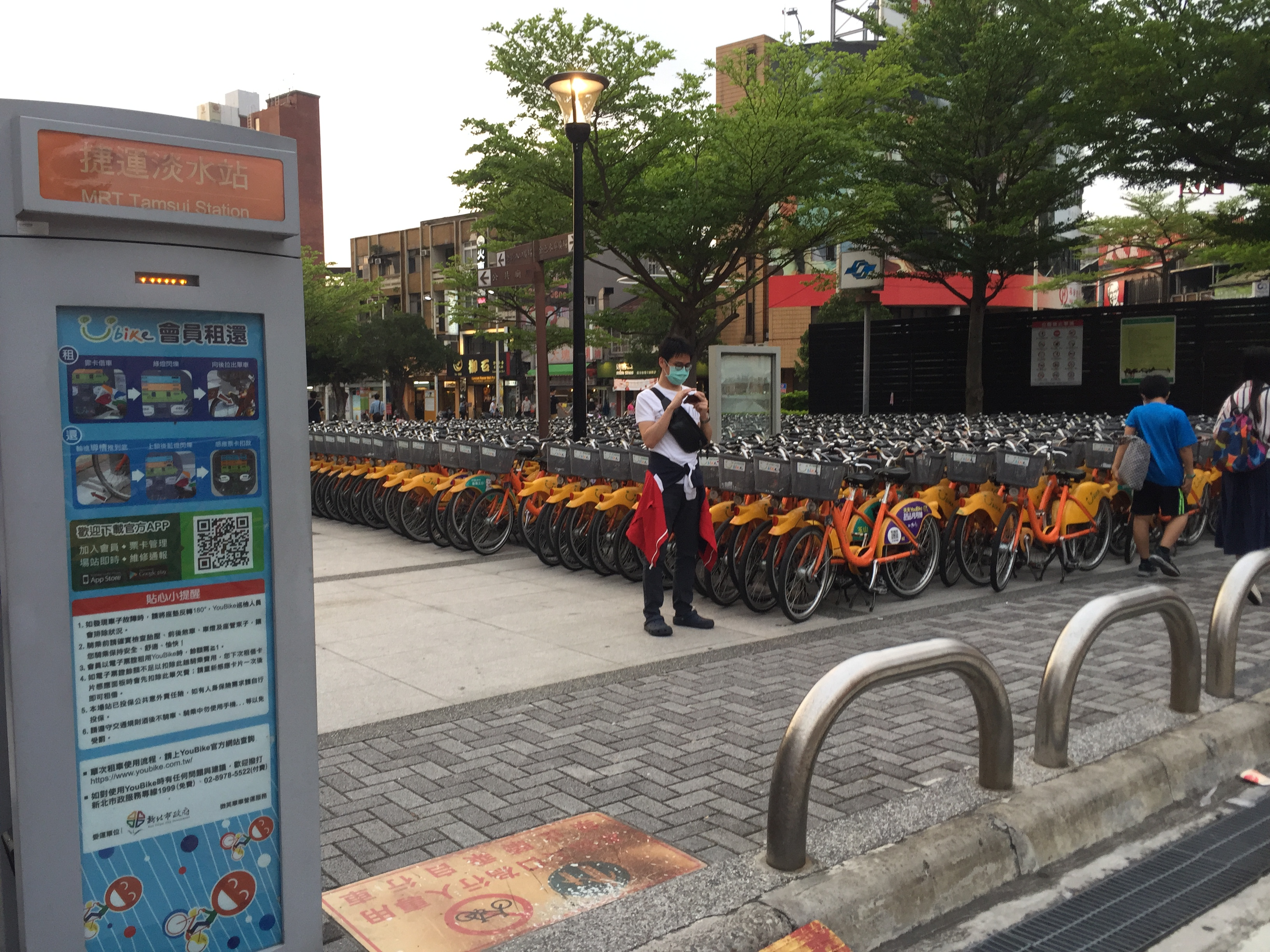
The Youbike station near Tamsui Station of Taipei Metro Tamsui–Xinyi Line

YouBike, a bike sharing system in Taipei–Keelung metropolitan area, Taiwan, has automated stations near all Taipei Metro stations. The integration of YouBike stations and Taipei Metro aims at solving the "last mile" problem, thus improving transit accessibility and usability. It is hoped that YouBike could complement the shortcomings in the greater public transport. Commuters can check in or check out YouBikes near the metro stations to catch connections from the station to the destination.

Transfer Discount Offered for Commuters

Starting 30 March 2021, passengers renting a YouBike from any YouBike station in the Taipei–Keelung metropolitan area receive a discount of NT$5 when using their EasyCard to transfer between YouBike and Taipei Metro, local buses (except buses that charge by distance) or Danhai LRT within one hour. Plus, the trip is only eligible for a discount when the transfer is direct. Commuters shall not utilise other means of transportation, such as Taiwan Railways, Maokong Gondola, long-distance buses, Taiwan High Speed Rail, Taoyuan Metro, or taxis.

Transfer Behavior

According to the analysis of YouBike rental and its Taipei MRT (Taipei Rapid Transit System) transfer behavior from the Department of Transportation, New Taipei City Government, YouBike has already become an important feeder mode for metro commuters: up to 55% of the subjects (the commuters who ever utilise YouBike during September, 2015) transfer by YouBike before or after taking the Metro. Adopting the YouBike and MRT transaction data of EasyCard in New Taipei City in November, 2016, almost all popular YouBike stations can be found next to the Taipei metro stations. Furthermore, transfer analysis depending on the YouBike and MRT data indicates that, the transfer ratio of loyal users (who utilise YouBike more than five times per week) is up to 60%.

==== Seoul Metropolitan Area, South Korea ====
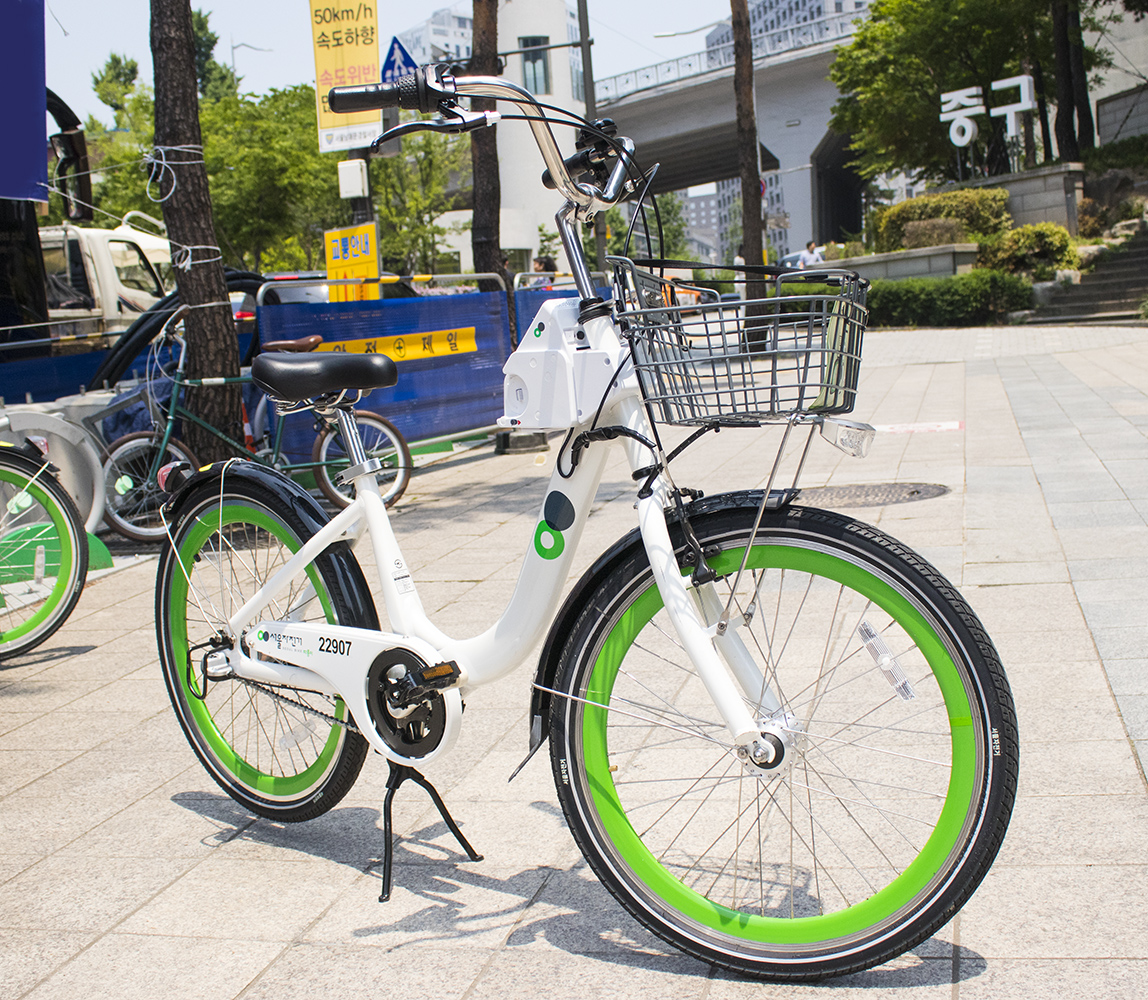
Ddareungi (Korean: 따릉이) is Seoul's bike sharing system, which was set up in 2015.

Sharing bicycles in South Korea are called 'Ddareungi' in Seoul capital area. Ddareungi is a sharing bicycle operated throughout Seoul. It is an unmanned sharing bicycle rental service that started pilot operation in 2014 and officially operated in October 2015.

The 1-hour pass for Ddareungi is KRW 1000(Approximate 1 USD), and to prevent theft, an additional charge of KRW 1000 per 30 minutes is charged for exceeding the usage time.

Transit Mileage

Transit Mileage is a benefit that can only be received by 365-day commuter pass users. If someone uses public transportation within 30 minutes of returning the bicycle, the mileage is accumulated. If it is difficult to travel by bus or subway, the section can be replaced with Ddareungi.

Bicycle Driving Ability Certification System Fee Benefits

Bicycle driving ability certification system requires completion of bicycle safety education, if a person passes both the written and practical exams, that person will receive certification and part of the Ddareungi usage fee can be reduced for two years.

QR Code Lock

From 1 March 2020, QR Code Lock was introduced as a method of renting and returning by recognizing QR codes. It is convenient because it can be rented or returned with a single scan by using a QR code-type locking device. When renting a bicycle, purchase a voucher from the bicycle app and scan the QR code on the bicycle to rent, and the lock is automatically unlocked and can be used immediately. It can return and rent a bicycle anywhere without going to a bicycle rental booth.

Sprout Ddareungyi

Existing sharing bicycles can only be used by those over the age of 15, so Sprout Ddareungyi, which can be rented from the age of 13 and older, has been launched in Seoul. The government released a policy for public bicycles with reduced size and weight compared to the existing Ddareungi bicycles so that even small-sized people, such as teenagers and the elderly, could use them conveniently.

The number of users of Seoul's public bicycle 'Ddareungi' has exceeded 3 million. It is used by about one in three Seoul citizens. General citizens have a high rate of use during commuting hours on weekdays, except on weekends, so after using public transportation such as Seoul Metropolitan Subway as well as Seoul Buses, when it is an ambiguous distance to use public transportation anymore, citizens use public bicycles near subway stations to move the most. In particular, considering that rentals and returns are made at rental stations near subway stations, citizens frequently use Ddareungi that are deployed in subway stations. To analyse, if the number of cases is classified based on the number of Ddareungi rental stations near subway stations in 2021, exit 1 of the Ttukseom Park area of Hangang Park, which is the most used in Seoul, is the first with 602 rentals, After that, Express Bus Terminal Station and Lotte World Tower's Jamsil Station Exit 2 followed. It is analysed that the most frequently used Ttukseom area, exit 1, is usually used by citizens who enjoy leisure at Hangang Park except during rush hour.

==== Hamburg, Germany ====
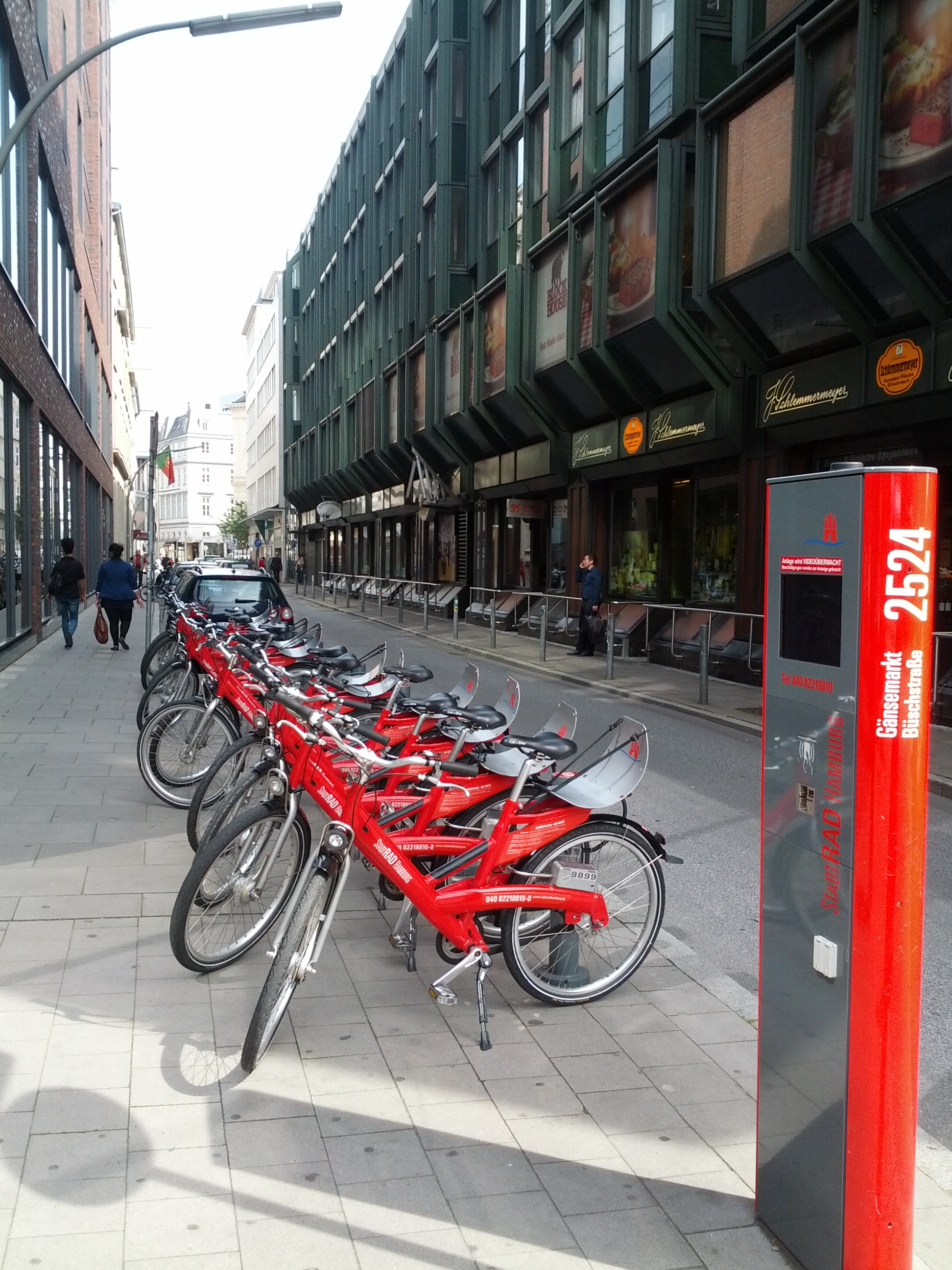
Stadtrad Hamburg.

The bicycle sharing system "StadtRAD" of Hamburg (Germany) was launched in 2009 and now includes 3,100 bicycles and 20 cargo bikes. The infrastructure includes 250 fixed stations distributed throughout the city. With the help of the app, it is possible to rent up to two bikes. For an annual fee of €5, the first 30 minutes of each rental are free. A total of 500,000 people are registered with the app.

"StadtRAD" is an integral part of the city's mobility transition. The aim here is to reduce motorized private transport by strengthening public transport, making it easier to switch between different modes of transport and developing the city into a bicycle city. To achieve this, the share of cyclists in total traffic should increase to 25%.

The administrative responsibility for implementing the mobility strategy is assumed by the Alliance for Cycling, which is assigned to the Authority for Transport and Mobility Change. Its task is to make the transport infrastructure bicycle-friendly by promoting the construction of bike and ride facilities, making subway stops barrier-friendly and expanding bicycle routes. In addition, it should be made easier to take bicycles on buses and trains, and traffic safety should be strengthened through traffic education in schools. Another focus is on the interconnection of the different mobility offers through the Switchh app. Citizens can switch between carsharing, e-scooter or offers from the HVV by making reservations or bookings. The integration of "StadtRAD" is planned to take place in 2022.

For the practical implementation of the bicycle sharing system Stadtrad, the city has contracted "Deutsche Bahn Connect". Deutsche Bahn Connect is committed to setting up and operating a public bike sharing system with fixed rental stations within the city boundaries.

In a study conducted by the University of Hamburg, users state that they use the Stadtrad mainly for leisure (55.9%) and regularly spend time in the city center (89.9%). The frequency of use is several times a month (24.9%) and several times a half year (24.9%). In addition, the study shows that the city bike has a positive image among users, they are largely satisfied with the service and recognize environmental and health benefits. Another study by the authors shows that implementing a green public service increases both perceived social and environmental value. Perceived social and environmental values have a positive influence on the user's green attitude and intentions.

At the same time, however, the need for a reporting system for sharing systems is emphasized, which ideally should be standardized and comparable with other regions. Especially for outsourced projects, monitoring and control processes must be implemented to ensure consistent quality. This includes the use of advanced prediction models to balance the load effectively by forecasting bike-sharing activity and addressing underflow and overflow issues dynamically. In addition to the environmental benefits, financial and time constraints must also be considered in large urban planning projects. Hamburg has increased spending on bicycle infrastructure since 2011, spending 15 million euros on it in 2017.

=== Integration with motor vehicles ===
Some car park operators such as Vinci Park in France lend bikes to their customers who park a car.

City CarShare, a San Francisco-based non-profit, received a federal grant in 2012 to integrate electric bicycles within its existing car-sharing fleet. The program is set to launch before the end of 2012 with 45 bikes.

== Financing ==
The financing of bicycle-sharing system have been maintained by a combination of fees, volunteer, charity, advertisements, business interest groups and government subsidies. The international expansion dockless bicycles in the mid 2010s has been financed by investment capital.

=== User fees ===
User rent fees may range from the equivalent of US$0.50 to 30.00 per day, rent fees for 15- or 20-minute intervals can range from a few cents to 1.00. Many bike-share systems offer subscriptions that make the first 30–45 minutes of use either free or very inexpensive, encouraging use as transportation. This allows each bike to serve several users per day but reduces revenue. Monthly or yearly membership subscriptions and initial registration fees may apply. To reduce losses from theft often users are required to commit to temporary deposit via a credit card or debit card. If the bike is not returned within the subscription period, or returned with significant damage, the bike sharing operator keeps the deposit or withdraws money from the user's credit card account. operated by private companies as is the case in most cities in China.

=== Advertisement revenue ===
Second and third generation schemes in the 90s already prominently included advertising opportunities on the individual bikes in form of advertisement areas on the wheels or frame. Other schemes are completely branded according to a sponsor, notable example London's bike share which was originally branded and sponsored by Barclays Bank and subsequently by Santander UK.

Several European cities, including the French cities of Lyon and Paris as well as London, Barcelona, Stockholm and Oslo, have signed contracts with private advertising agencies (JCDecaux in Brussels, Lyon, Paris, Seville, Dublin and Oslo; Clear Channel in Stockholm, Barcelona, Antwerp, Perpignan and Zaragoza) which supply the city with thousands of bicycles free of charge (or for a minor fee). In return, the agencies are allowed to advertise both on the bikes themselves and in other select locations in the city, typically in the form of advertising on stations or the bicycles themselves.

=== Government subsidies ===
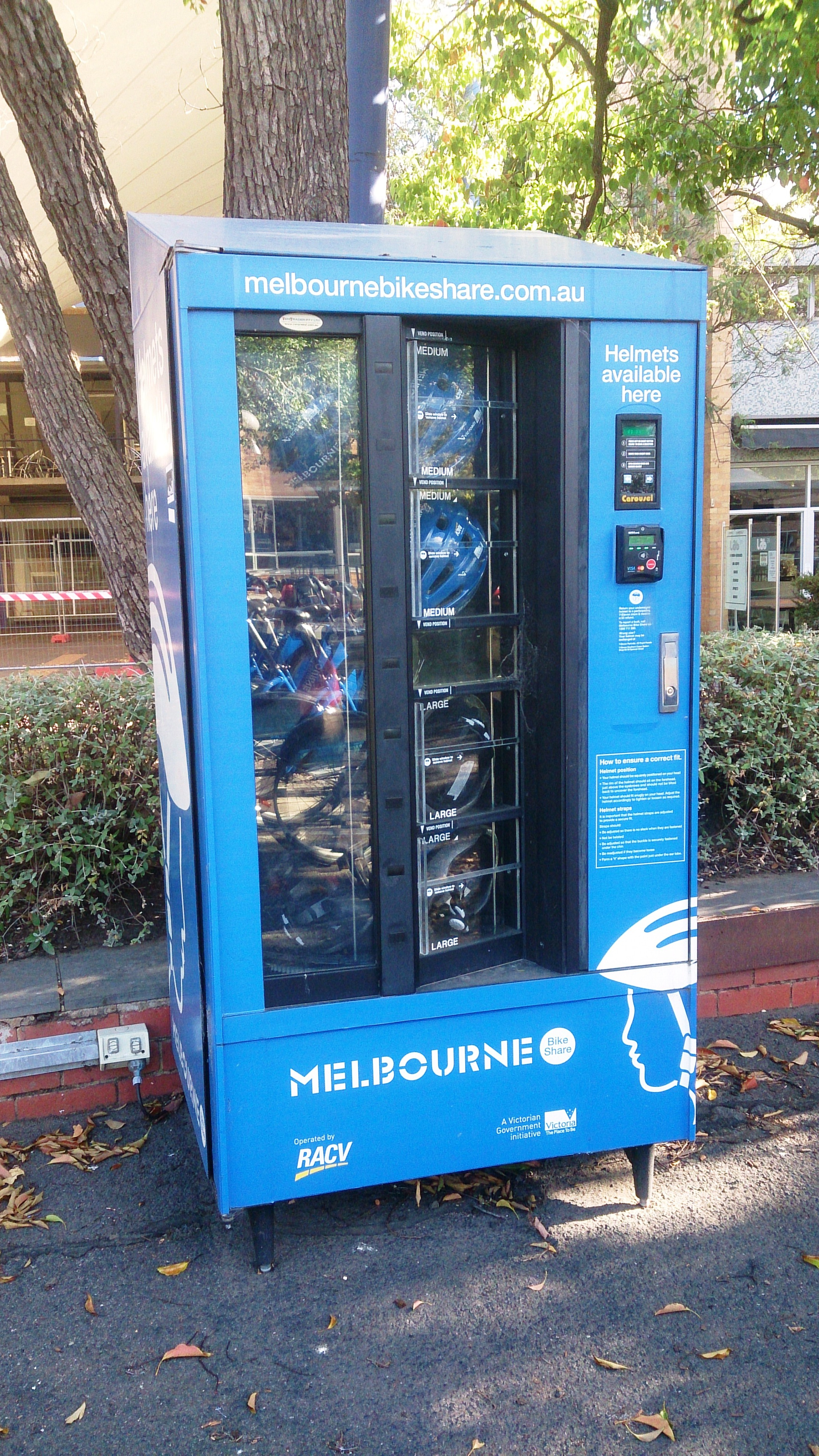
A bicycle helmets vending machine in the University of Melbourne Parkville campus, Australia

Municipalities have operated and do operate bicycle share systems as a public service, paying for the initial investment, maintenance and operations if it is not covered by other revenue sources. Governments can also support bicycle share programs in forms of one time grants (often to buy a set of bicycles), yearly of monthly subsidies, or by paying part of the employee wages (example in repair workshops that employee long-term unemployed persons). Many of the membership-based systems are operated through public-private partnerships. Some schemes may be financed as a part of the public transportation system (for example Smoove). In Melbourne the government subsidises the sale of bicycle helmets to enable spontaneous cyclists comply with the mandatory helmet laws.

== Usage patterns ==
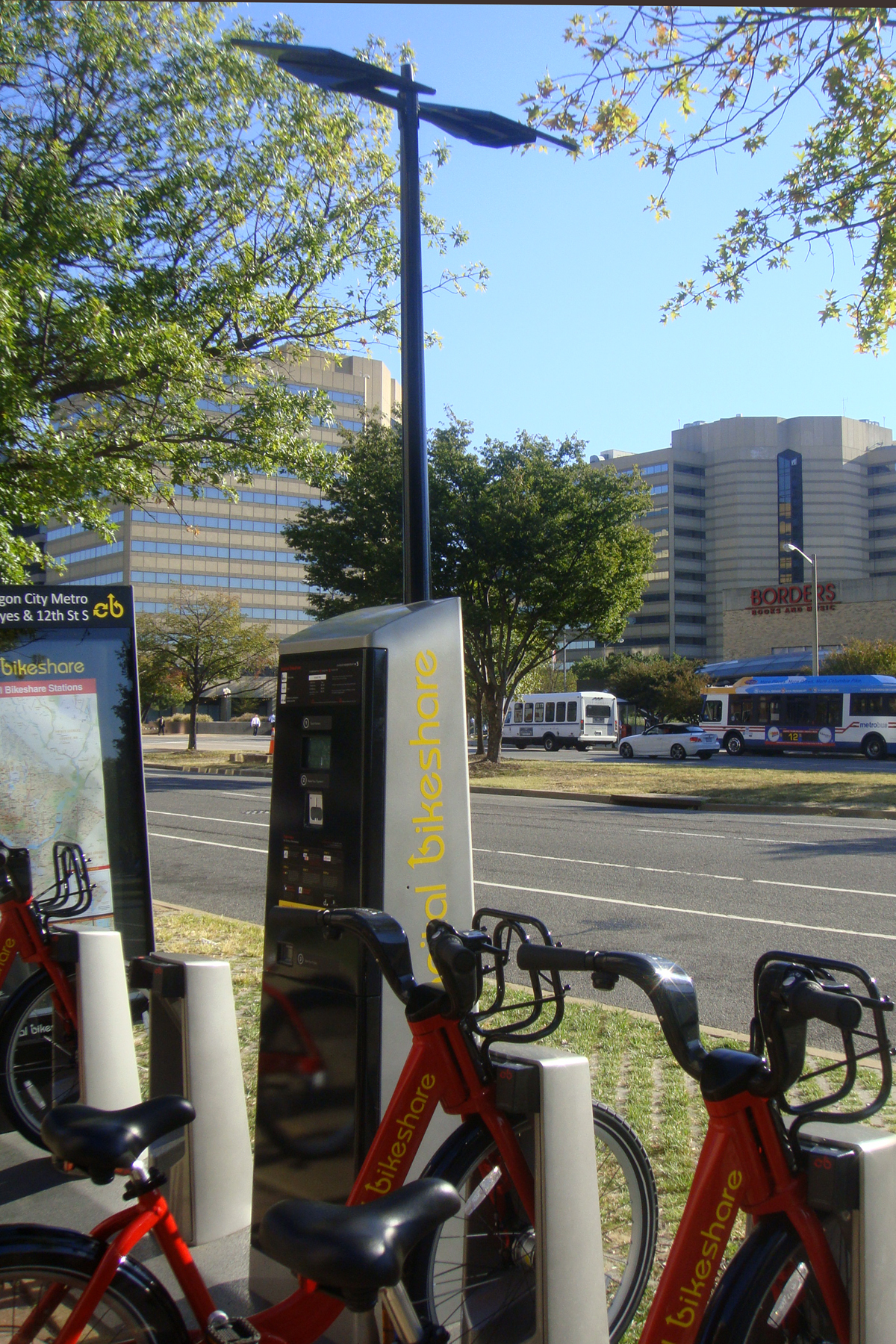
Bicycle station in the Washington, D.C., suburbs powered by solar panels

Most bike-sharing systems allow the bicycles to be returned to any station in the system, which facilitates one-way trips because the users do not need to return the bicycles to the origin. Thus, one bike may take 10–15 rides a day with different users and can be ridden up to 10,000 km (6,200 mi) a year (as in Vélo'v in Lyon, France). Each bike has at least one rides with one unique user per day which indicates that in 2014 there were a minimum of at least 294 million unique bike share cyclists worldwide (806,200 bicycles × 365) although some estimates are much.

It was found—in cities like Paris and Copenhagen—that to have a major impact there had to be a high density of available bikes. Copenhagen has 2500 bikes which cannot be used outside the 9 km^{2} (3.5 sq mi) zone of the city centre (a fine of DKK 1000 applies to any user taking bikes across the canal bridges around the periphery). Since Paris's Vélib' programme operates with an increasing fee past the free first half-hour, users have a strong disincentive to take the bicycles out of the city centre. The distance between stations is only 300–400 metres (1,000–1,300 ft) in inner city areas.

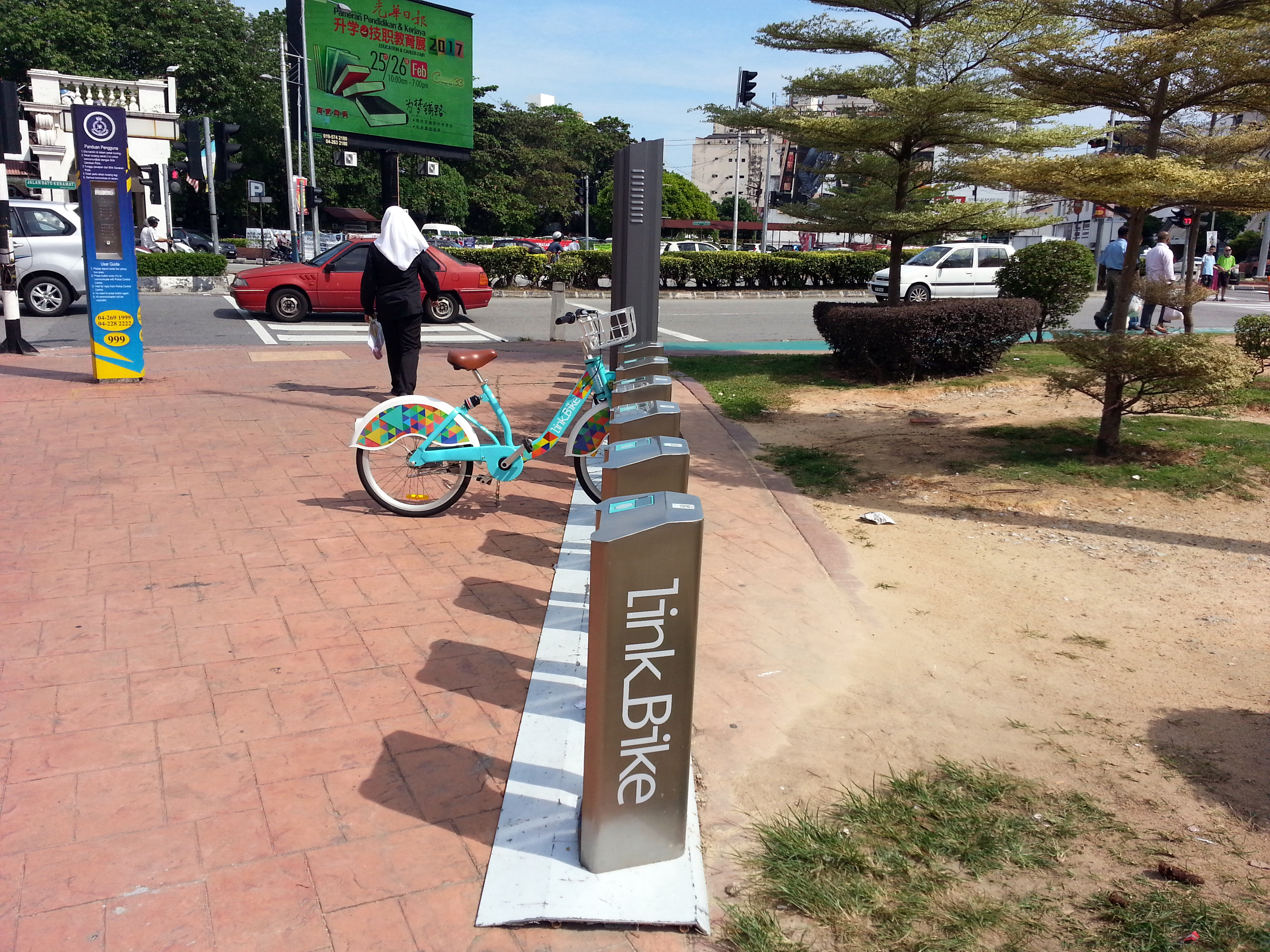
A LinkBike station in George Town, Penang. The public bicycle sharing service was launched in 2016.

In the US, male users of bike sharing made up for more than 80% of total trips made in 2017.

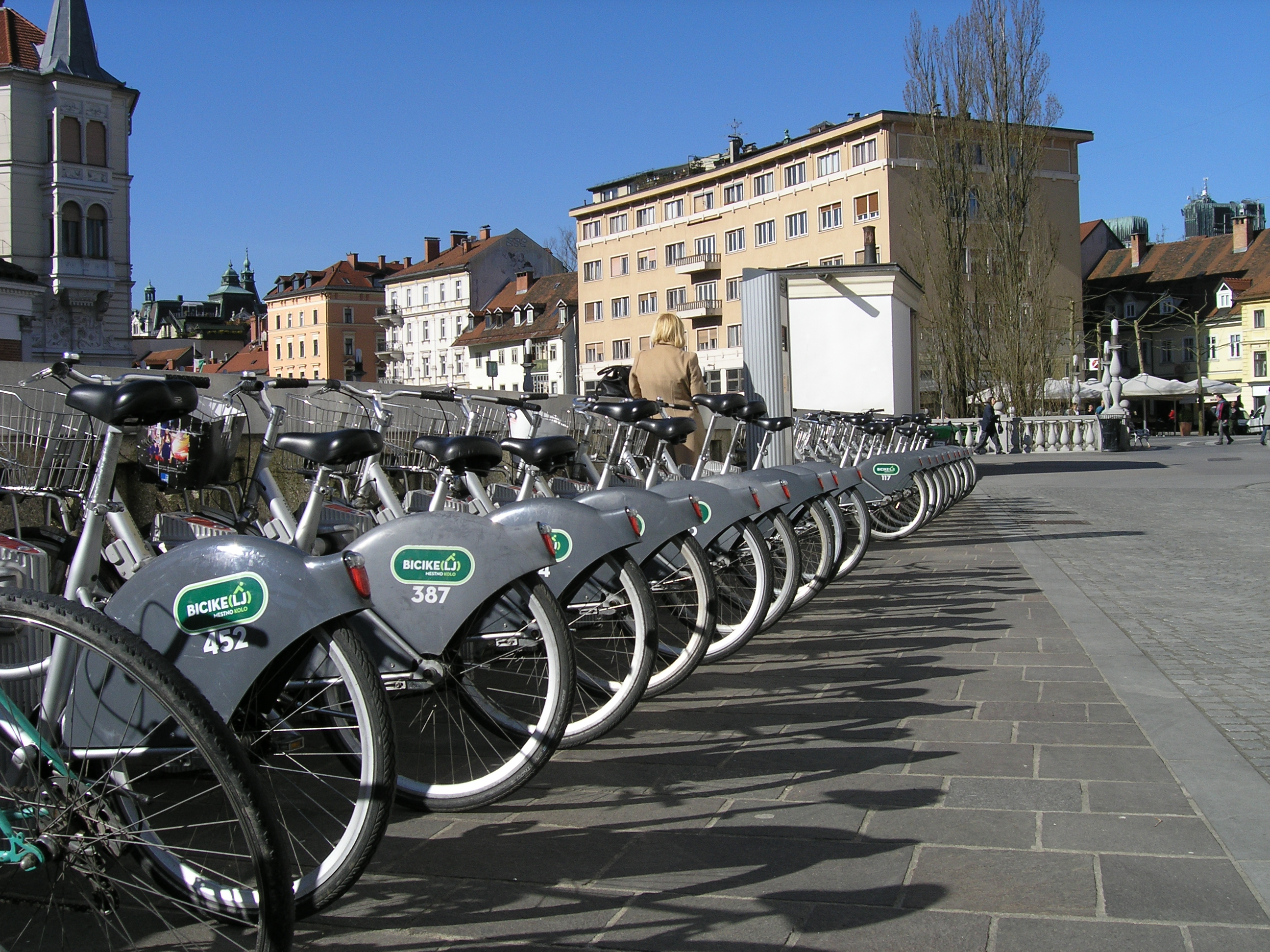
BicikeLJ in Ljubljana, Slovenia

A study published in 2015 in the journal Transportation concludes that bike sharing systems can be grouped into behaviourally similar categories based upon their size. Cluster analysis shows that larger systems have different usage patterns in different stations, whilst in smaller systems the different stations have similar daily utilization patterns.

=== Databases ===
The Meddin Bike-Sharing World Map contains details of the world's bikeshare services. It contains details of the schemes, providers, type of bikes (manual or electric) the number of bikes and stations and availability in a user-friendly map format.

The General Bikeshare Feed Specification is a standardised data format shared mobility information and providesproviding the current status of a mobility service at a point in time.

== Economic impact ==
Bike-share programs generate a number of economic externalities, both positive and negative. The positive externalities include reduction of excess downtown parking spaces, traffic congestion and pollution, while the negative externalities can include the degradation of urban aesthetic environment. Furthermore, bike-share programs have pecuniary effects. Some of these economic externalities (e.g. reduced congestion) can be systematically evaluated using empirical data, and therefore may be internalized through government subsidy. On the other hand, "nuisance" externalities (e.g. street and sidewalk clutter) are more subjective and harder to quantify, and may not be able to be internalized.

=== Internalization of externalities ===
==== Public-private partnerships ====
In public economics, there is a role for government intervention in a market if market failures exist, or in the case of redistribution. As several studies have found, bike-share programs appear to produce net positive externalities in reduced traffic congestion and pollution, for example. The bike-sharing market does not produce at the social optimum, justifying the need for government intervention in the form of a subsidy for the provision of this good in order to internalize the positive externality. Many cities have adopted public-private partnerships to provide bike-shares, such as in Washington, D.C., with Capital Bikeshares.

=== Dangers of over-supply ===
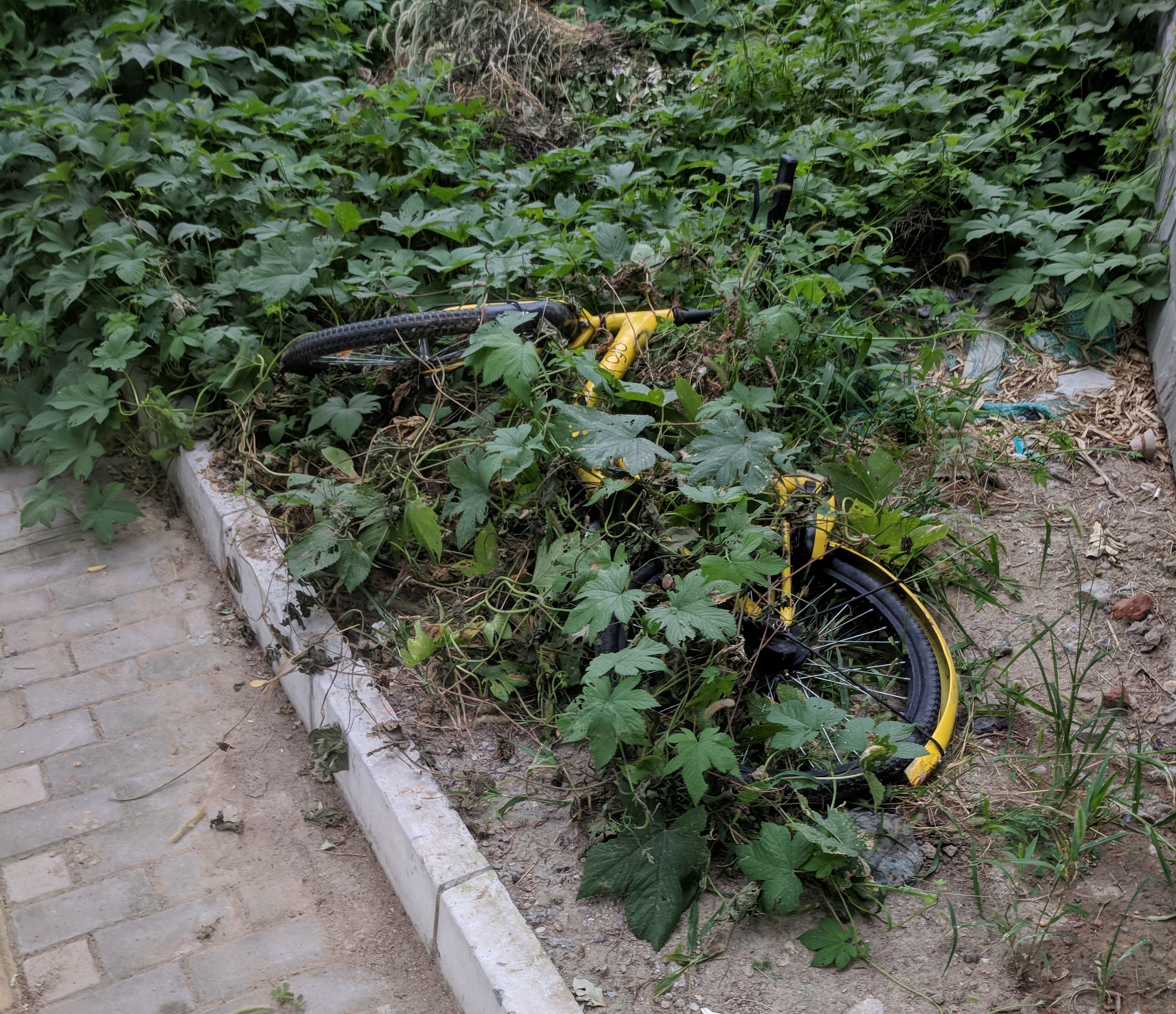
A shared bicycle was discarded in the grass

Many bike-share companies and public-private partnerships aim to supply shared bicycles as a public good. In order for bike-shares to be a public good, they must be both non-excludable and non-rival. Numerous bike-share programs already offer their services partly for free or at least at very low prices, therefore nearing the non-excludable requirement. However, in order to achieve the non-rival requirement, shared bicycles must be supplied at a certain density within an urban area. There are numerous challenges with attaining non-rivalry, for instance, redistribution of bicycles from low-demand regions to regions with high-demand. Mobike, a China-based company, has addressed this problem by paying their users to ride their bikes from low-demand areas to high-demand areas. Citi Bike in New York City has a similar "Bike Angel" program to give discounts and prizes to balancers.

Other companies such as oBike have introduced a points system to penalize negative behavior, namely, illegal parking of shared bicycles. Economists speculate that a combination of efficient pricing with well-designed regulatory policies could significantly mitigate problems of over-supply and clutter.

The Chinese bicycle-sharing market demonstrated the danger of oversupply in 2018. Companies took advantage of unclear regulations in the preceding years to introduce millions of shared bikes to the country's cities. Users were not educated in how to use the systems properly and in many cases treated them as disposable, parking them anywhere. City governments were forced to impound the abandoned bikes when they blocked public thoroughfares, and millions of bikes went directly to junkyards after the companies that owned them went bankrupt.

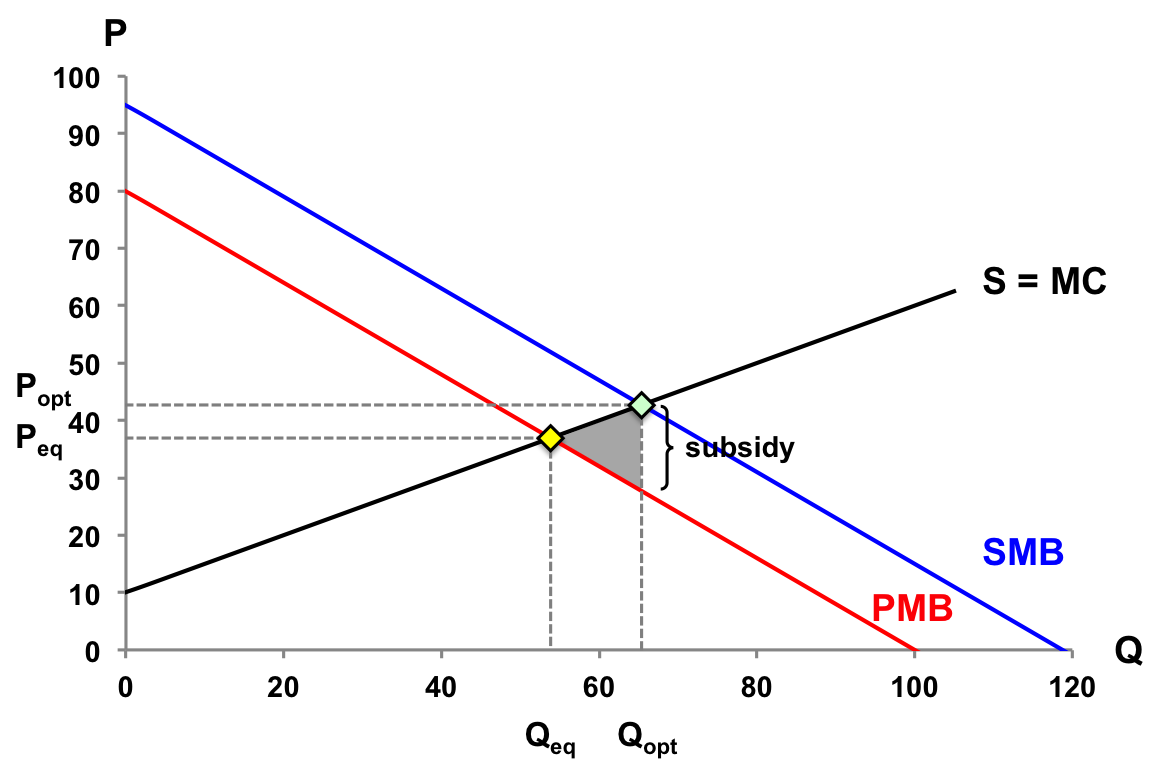
Graph depicting market with positive consumption externality. Curves representing supply, private marginal benefit (demand) and social marginal benefit are shown. Equilibrium and optimal prices and quantities are marked. Deadweight loss is shown as the gray triangle, and the size of the subsidy required to internalize the externality is marked.

== Environmental, health and social impacts ==
=== Less traffic congestion ===
A primary goal of bicycle-sharing systems has been to reduce traffic congestion, particularly in large urban areas. Some empirical evidence indicates that this goal has been achieved to varying degrees in different cities. A 2015 article in Transport Reviews examined bike-share systems in five cities, including Washington, D.C., and Minneapolis. The article found that in D.C., individuals substituted bike-share rides for automobile trips 8 percent of the time, and almost 20 percent of the time in Minneapolis. A separate study on Washington, D.C.'s Capital Bikeshare found that the bike-share program contributed a 2 to 3 percent reduction in traffic congestion within the evaluated neighborhood. 2017 studies in Beijing and Shanghai have linked the massive increase of dockless bike shares to the decrease in the number of private automobile trips that are less than five kilometres. In Guangzhou, the arrival of dockless bike shares had a positive impact in the growth of cycling mode share.

=== Less pollution ===
Not only do bike-share systems intend to reduce traffic congestion, they also aim to reduce air pollution through decreased automobile usage, and indirectly through the reduction of congestion. The study on D.C.'s Capital Bikeshare estimated that the reduction in traffic congestion would be equivalent to roughly $1.28 million in annual benefits, accrued through the reduction in congestion-induced CO_{2} emissions. A separate study of transportation in Australia estimated that 1.5 kilograms of CO_{2} equivalent emissions are avoided by an urban resident who travels 5 kilometers by cycling rather than by car during rush hour periods.

=== Sustainable alternative for short trips ===
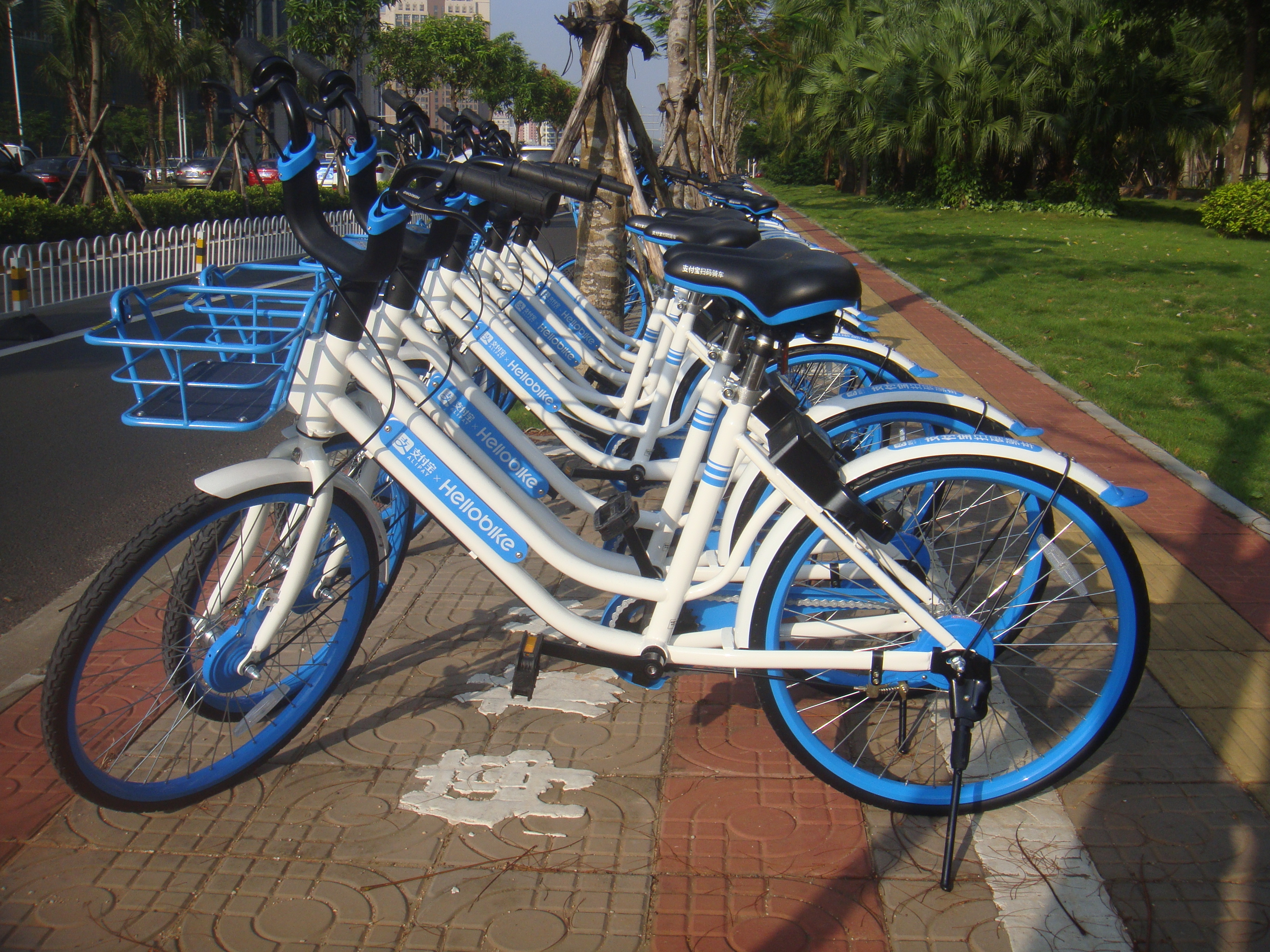
A Hellobike, one of the biggest bike sharing companies in Shanghai

Most large-scale urban bike sharing programmes have numerous bike check-out stations, and operate much like public transit systems, catering to tourists and visitors as well as local residents. Their central concept is to provide free or affordable access to bicycles for short-distance trips in an urban area as an alternative to private vehicles, thereby reducing congestion, noise, and air pollution. According to research in 2016, the bike sharing system in Shanghai saved 8,358 tonnes of petrol and decreased carbon dioxide and NOx emissions by 25,240 and 64 tonnes, respectively. The research also stated that bike sharing system has great potential to reduce energy consumption and emissions based on its rapid development.

=== Last mile solution ===
Bicycle-sharing systems have also been cited as a way to solve the "last mile" problem of public transit networks. According to a research conducted on YouBike system in Taipei, in 2014, the bike sharing system in residential area are more popular, and as a first/last mile of transport mode to and from the station to their desired locations. However, dock systems, serving only stations, resemble public transit and have therefore been criticized as less convenient than a privately owned bicycle used door-to-door.

=== Health ===
Bicycle-sharing systems have been shown to have a strong net positive effect on health. Cycling provides a variety of health benefits and reduces the risk of cancers, heart disease, diabetes and obesity that are prevalent in sedentary lifestyles. Bike sharing schemes can improve health outcomes by encouraging more people to cycle. Cycling is also much less likely to cause harm to other road users, when compared with driving a car.

In the US it is estimated that bike-sharing trips result in an annual reduction of 4.7 premature deaths and US$36 million in health economic impacts mostly due to increased physical activity. Another study in Europe found that the bike sharing schemes in 12 major cities were also making a significant impact on health and saving millions in health costs. Bike sharing schemes also provided an important alternative to public transport for essential workers world-wide during the Covid-19 pandemic leading to recommendations that bike sharing can increase the sustainability and resilience of transport systems during disruptive public health events.

=== Reduced car parking ===
Bike-share programs, especially the earlier services that required docking areas along urban streets, may encroach upon the space available for on-street car parking and other auto-centric uses. While some argue that this is a negative, it is generally considered a positive side effect, since it helps further the transition away from car-dependency.

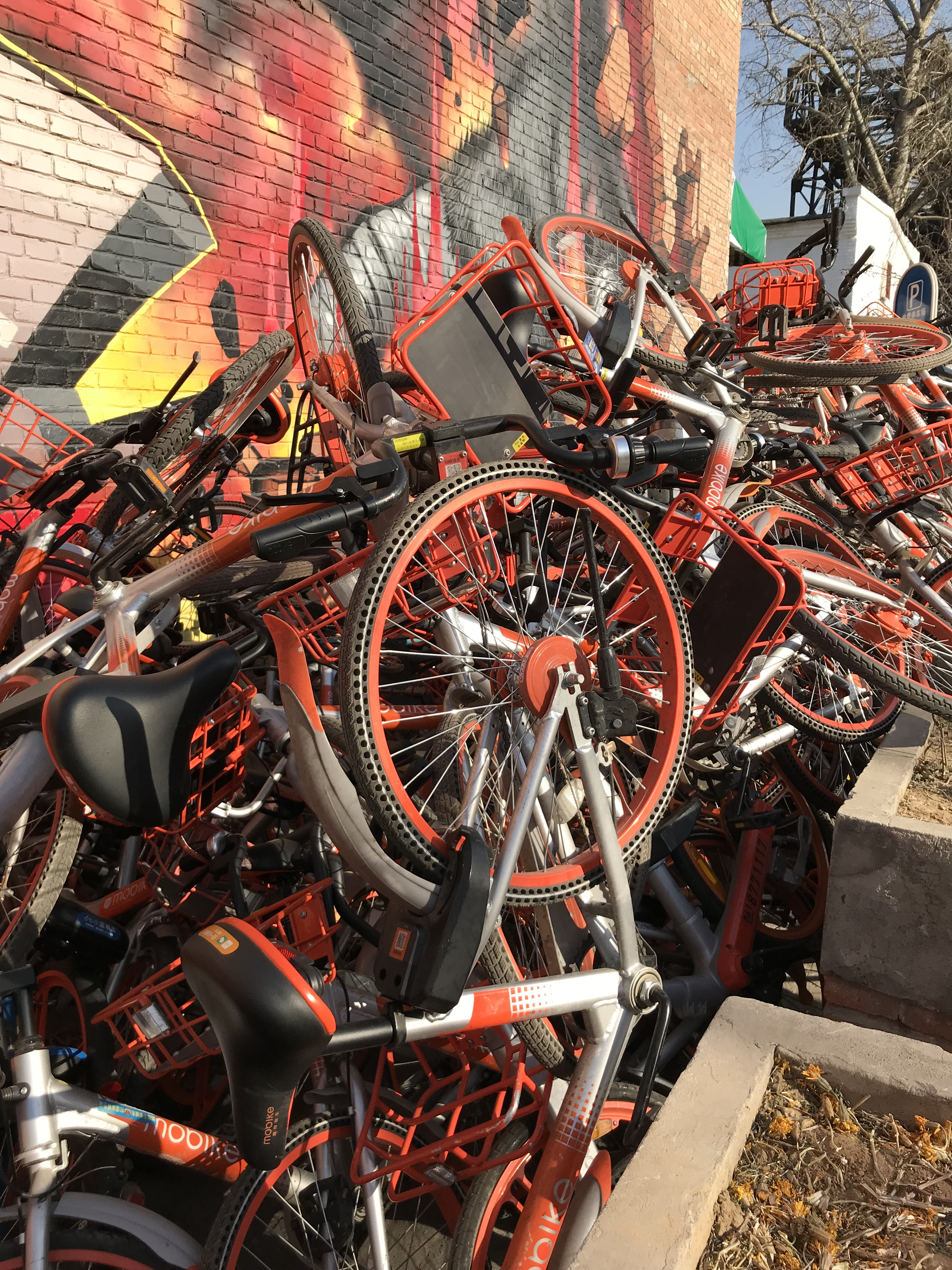
Bike-share company Mobike's bicycles clutter a sidewalk in 798 Arts District in Beijing, China.

=== Urban clutter ===
In some cities, the many dockless bike-share bicycles have cluttered streets and sidewalks, degrading the urban aesthetic environment and blocking pedestrian traffic. In particular, cycles on Chinese city streets have created sections of clogged sidewalks no longer walkable, and piles of illegally parked bicycles. Dockless cycles left randomly on public footpaths may impede access for wheelchair users and others who use mobility aids, and may be dangerous to people with visual impairments. Due to the vehicles being left in the public right of way, or abandoned obstructing pedestrians, the dockless vehicles have been called "litter bikes".

=== Transport poverty and inequality ===
Public Health Scotland has defined transport poverty as 'the lack of transport options that are available, reliable, affordable, accessible or safe that allow people to meet their daily needs and achieve a reasonable quality of life'. Transport is linked to inequalities in three main ways. Firstly, where people live determines what transport and travel options they have. Proximity to good transport affects land value and housing costs, therefore, people with more money have more options for where to live and how to travel. Secondly, opportunities and access to education, employment, amenities and healthcare is often determined by transport. Thirdly, the transport systems themselves determine accessibility including cost, geographical distribution and scheduling.

Bicycle sharing schemes have the potential to reduce transport poverty and inequalities by providing a new transport mode that may be more available, reliable, affordable, accessible and safe than other options, as well as being available in poorly served locations and facilitating access to opportunities and amenities. For example, evidence from the London bicycle sharing scheme shows that registered users from the most deprived areas had doubled over time.

Some critics claim that bike-share programs fail to reach more low-income communities. Some efforts have attempted to address this issue, such as New York City's Citi Bike's discounted membership program, which is aimed at increasing ridership among low-income residents. However, around 80% of study respondents reported that they had no knowledge of the program's discount.

A further criticism describes increasing discriminatory technical and organizational hurdles. In addition to registration—providing addresses, or security deposits, of money or bank card data—many systems require smartphones with certain operating systems and user accounts, usually by Apple or Google, or even a permanent or temporary mobile data connection for unlocking and returning the bicycles. Others offer the same functions via SMS, telephone, or a previously purchased chip card.

== See also ==
- Alternatives to the automobile
- Automobile dependency
- Autonomous bicycle
- Bicycle cooperative
- Bike rental
- Bicycle-sharing systems in Kraków
- Carsharing and peer-to-peer carsharing
- Collaborative consumption
- Electric two-wheeler sharing
- List of bicycle-sharing systems
- Outline of cycling
- Scooter-sharing system
- Sustainable transport
- Public–private partnership
- Tandem bicycle
- Orphan bicycle, an abandoned bicycle in the public
