= Bicycle-sharing systems in Kraków =

Polish shared transport services

Park-e-Bike and LajkBike
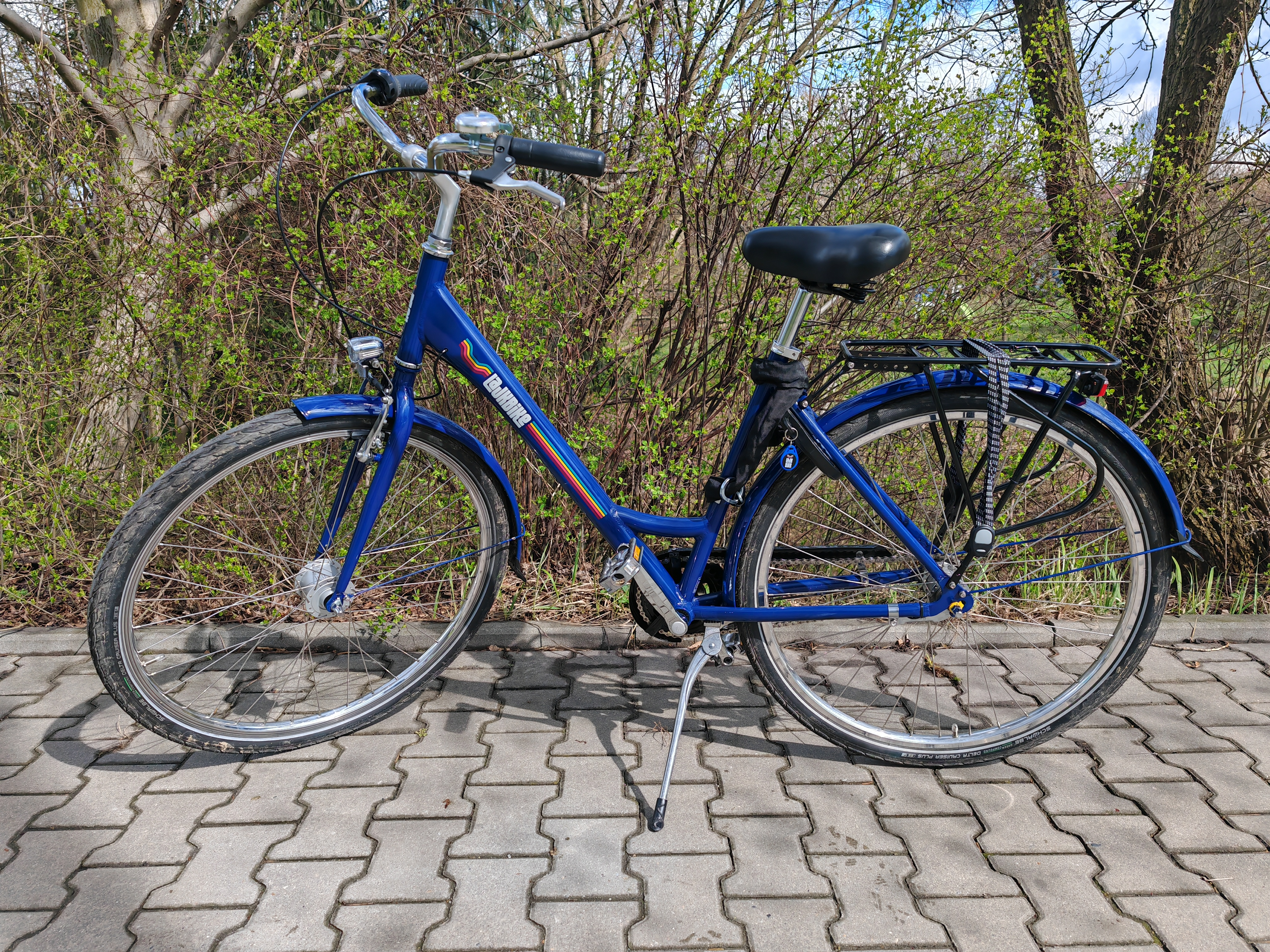
- Bicycle from the LajkBike system

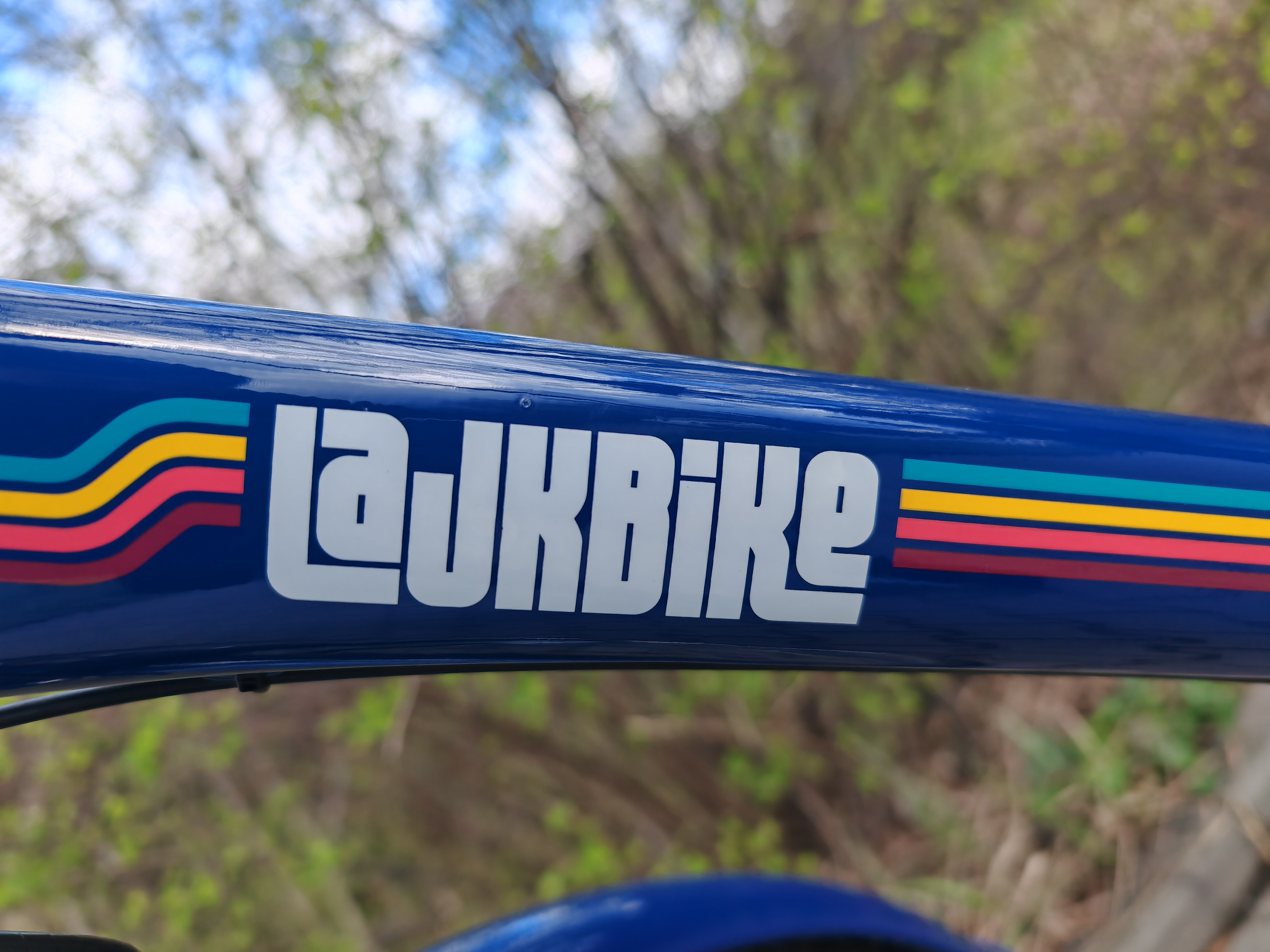
- LajkBike logo on a bicycle

Overview
- Locale: Kraków
- Transit type: Bicycle-sharing system
- Website: lajkbike.ztp.krakow.pl

Operation
- Began operation: 2008
- Operator(s): Kraków Public Transport Authority
- Number of vehicles: Park-e-Bike: 80; LajkBike: 750

Bicycle-sharing systems in Kraków have operated since 2008 under various brands and operational models. As of 2023, two systems are active: Park-e-Bike, offering free short-term rentals of electric bicycles at park-and-ride facilities, and LajkBike, providing long-term rentals of both electric and traditional bicycles.

== BikeOne ==
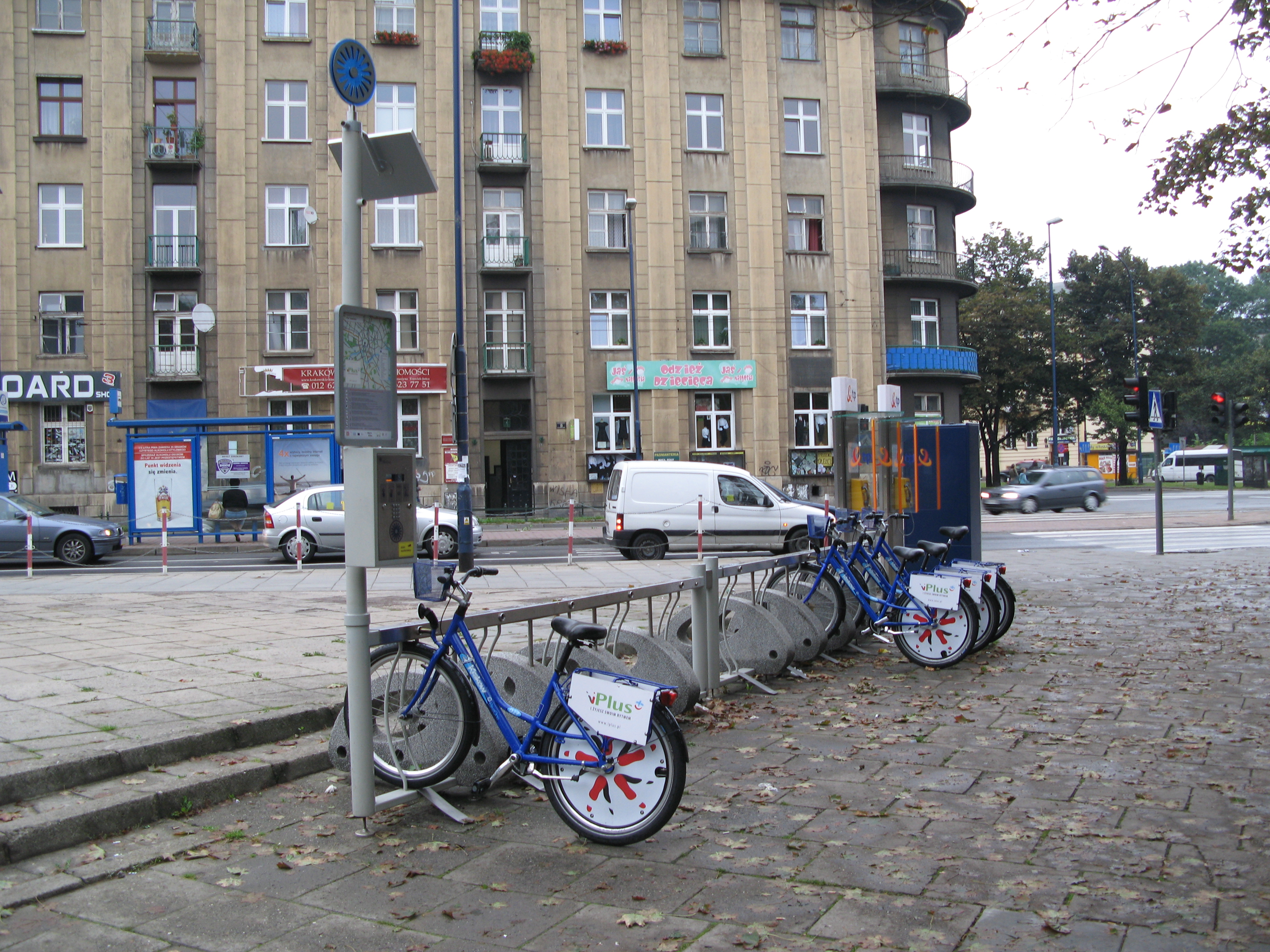
BikeOne station at Inwalidów Square in 2009

In July 2008, the city of Kraków signed a three-year contract with Warsaw-based Sanmargar Team to establish and operate a self-service bicycle-sharing system with 100 bicycles and 12 stations. Named BikeOne, the system launched on a trial basis from 17 November to 19 December 2008, becoming Poland's first such system.

In 2009, BikeOne began operations on 1 April and expanded with one additional station. In June 2010, the Allegro (company) foundation became the system's sponsor. On 14 November 2011, following the expiration of the contract with Sanmargar, all BikeOne bicycles and stations were transferred to the city.

On 8 May 2012, the Kraków Municipal Infrastructure and Transport Authority signed a 10-year contract with RoweRes, to manage the system. The agreement aimed to expand the network to 150 stations and 1,500 bicycles within three years. However, for most of the year, bicycles could not be detached from the stations.

== KMK Bike ==
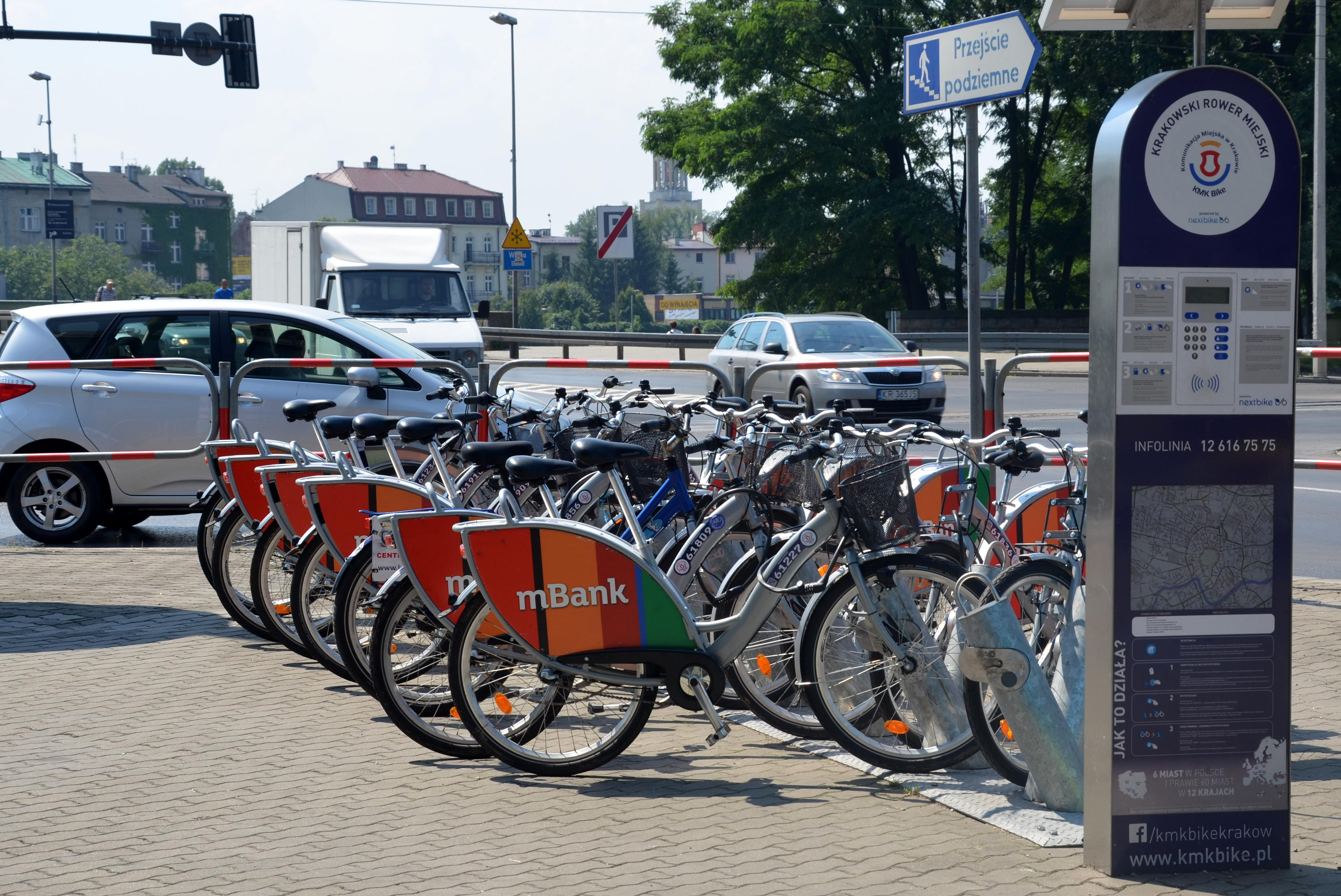
KMK Bike station in 2015

In early 2013, the contract with RoweRes was terminated, and the city decided to operate the system independently under the name KMK Bike. In mid-June, a tender was announced to equip 10 additional stations, and integration with the Kraków City Card began. These additional stations were launched in late August.

In 2014, the system started in late April with 29 stations and 230 bicycles, supplied by Nextbike, and operated by BikeU.

Assigning the operator role to a different company than the bicycle supplier caused delays in the system's launch. For the first time, bicycles could be rented using the Kraków City Card. In October, the system expanded with four stations in Nowa Huta and 35 additional bicycles. In 2015, a new operator, SmartBikes, was selected through a tender. The system launched on 27 March with 34 stations and 300 bicycles.

== Wavelo ==
=== History ===
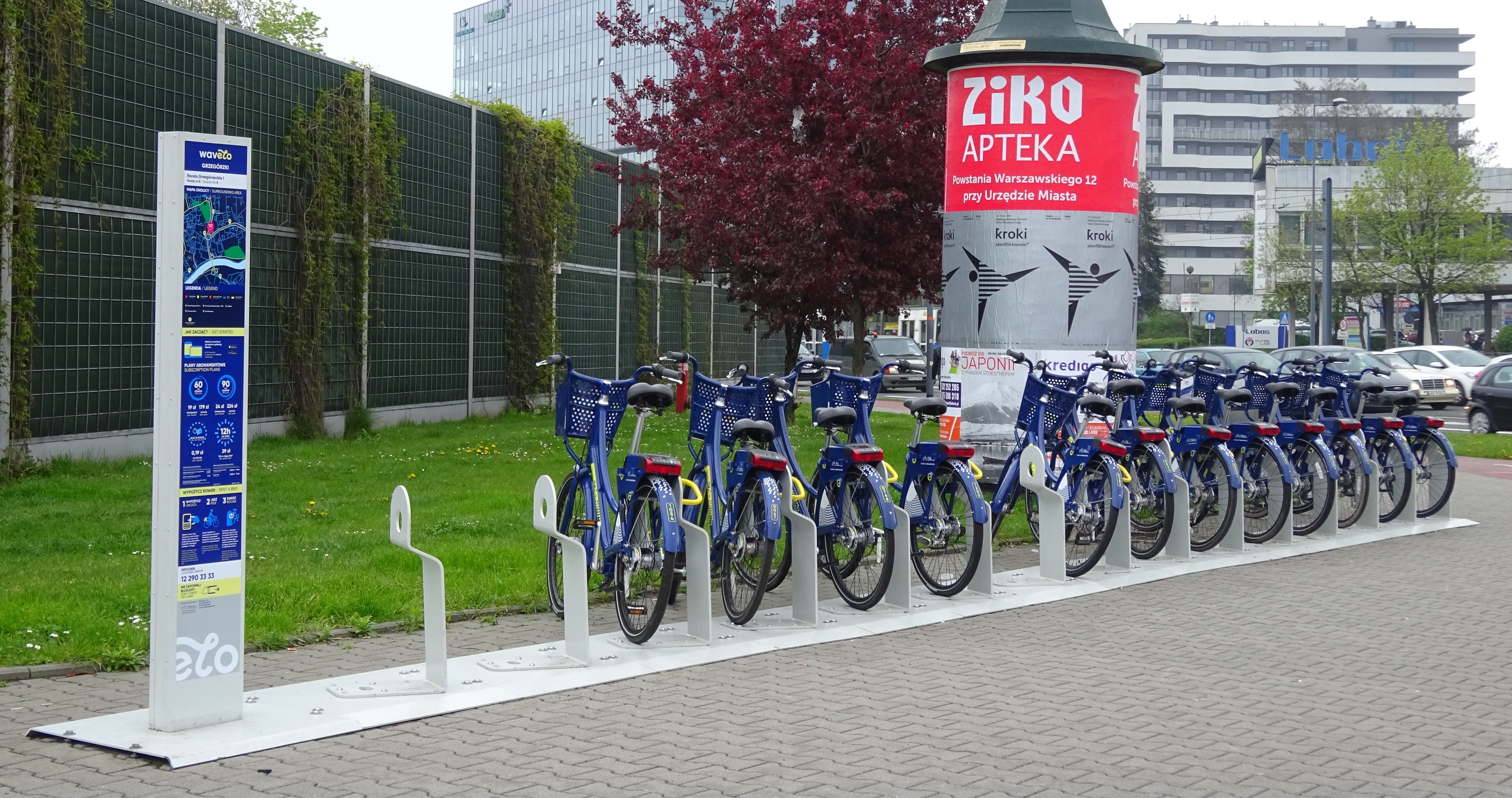
Wavelo station in 2017

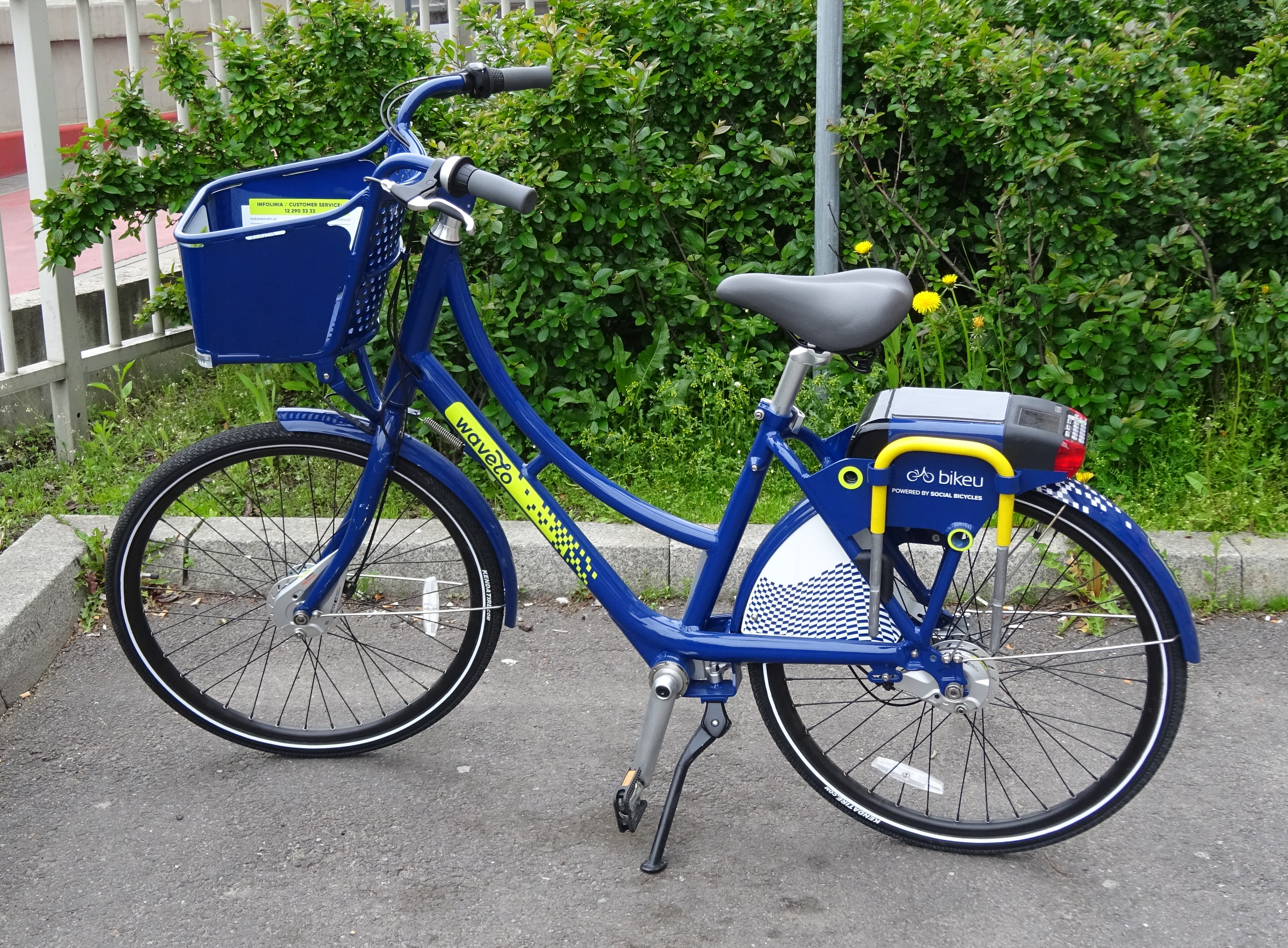
Wavelo bicycle

In December 2015, a tender was announced for the system's operation from 2016 to 2019 or 2023, aiming for 150 stations and 1,500 bicycles (500 during winter). Five companies expressed interest, with four submitting bids. The consortium of BikeU and Social Bicycles won, and an eight-year contract was signed on 14 July 2016. The city agreed to pay the operator 1 PLN per bicycle monthly, with the operator contributing 1% of revenue to the city. On 15 July 2016, a temporary system with 27 stations and 200 bicycles was launched using existing infrastructure, as seven central stations were closed due to World Youth Day 2016.

The new system, named Wavelo after a public vote, officially launched on 13 October 2016 with 15 stations and 100 bicycles. Old bicycles were donated to Kraków schools.

By March 2017, Wavelo expanded to 30 stations and 300 bicycles, introducing rentals without subscriptions. On 8 April, it reached 142 stations and 840 bicycles, close to the target of 150 stations and 1,500 bicycles. In July, a sponsored station opened at IKEA, the first of its kind, followed by four stations in Czyżyny and a second sponsored station at Bronowice Shopping Center. By December, the bicycle count was reduced to 550, and the system had 157 stations by year-end.

Between February and March 2018, a third sponsored station opened at Quattro Business Park. In May, two more sponsored stations were added at Bonarka City Center and Bonarka for Business, followed by one at Jasnogórska 1 Business Center in June. In 2019, three new sponsored stations were opened: Kapelanka 42 in January, Dot Office in March, and O3 Business Campus in July. In November 2019, BikeU terminated its contract, and Wavelo ceased operations on 31 December. Negotiations to sell Wavelo bicycles to other companies failed.

=== System operation ===
To use Wavelo, users registered via the operator's website or mobile app, choosing between two subscription plans with varying daily free minutes and billing options. A discounted winter pricing plan was offered. In 2018, discounts were introduced for Kraków Family Card holders, selected hotel guests, and students from specific universities. Bicycles were rented using a keypad on the bike, requiring a customer number and PIN for authentication. Leaving a bike outside a station incurred a 3 PLN fee within the system's zone or 100 PLN outside it, while returning a bike to a station earned a 1 PLN bonus.

=== Bicycles ===
Wavelo operated 1,500 bicycles, with at least 500 available in winter. Bicycles featured a driveshaft instead of a chain, a steel basket, an onboard computer, GPS, LED lighting, and a U-lock. Power was supplied by a dynamo and solar panel, and GPS allowed bikes to be left anywhere and aided theft prevention. Each bicycle was serviced every 500 km.

== Park-e-Bike ==
=== History ===
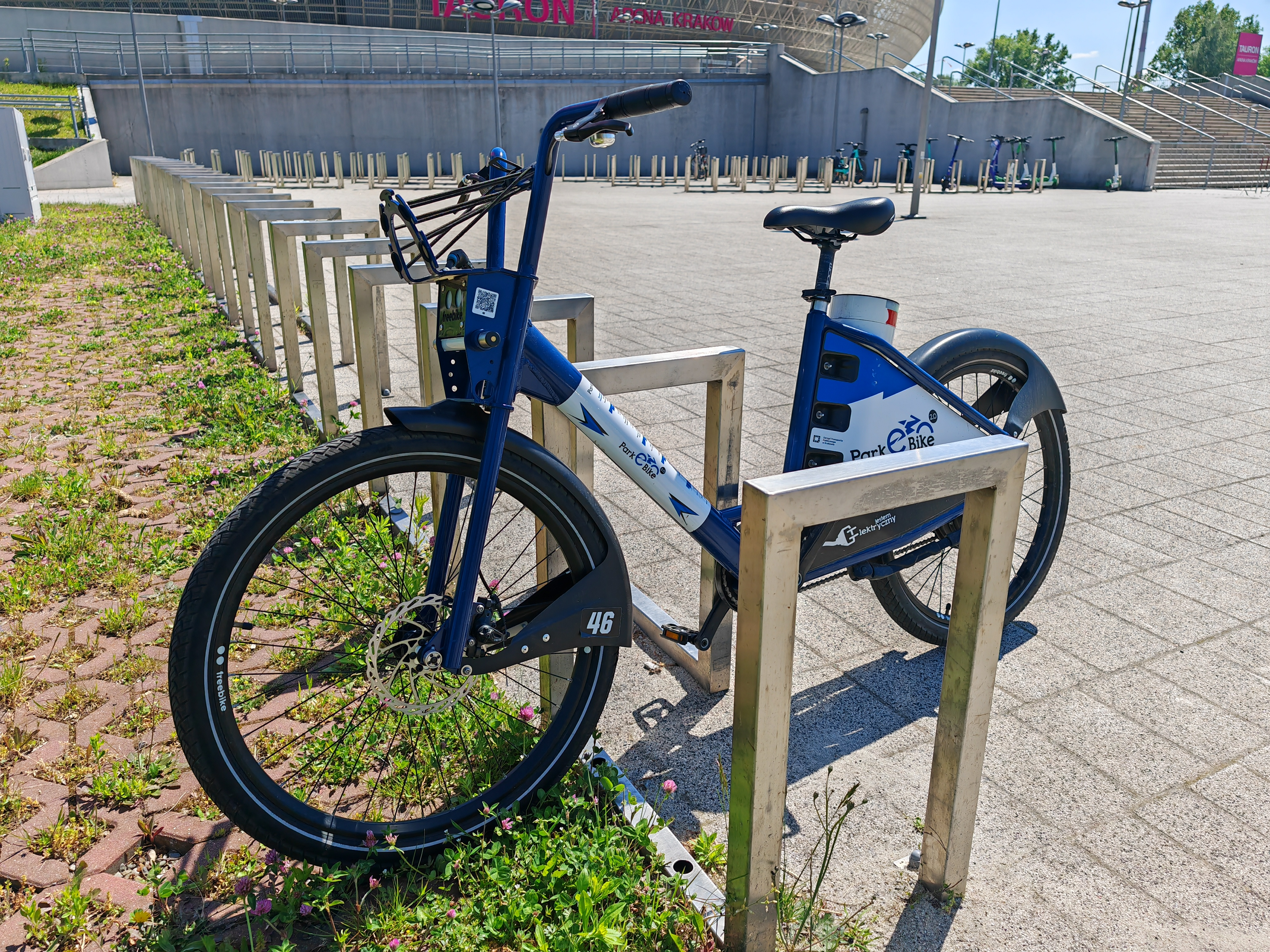
Park-e-Bike bicycle

In late 2020, the Kraków Public Transport Authority launched Park-e-Bike, a free electric bicycle rental system at the Czerwone Maki park and ride facility, with 43 bicycles. Initially, rentals required an on-site employee, but in 2021, a mobile app was introduced for rentals. In July 2022, Freebike won a tender to supply 100 additional electric bicycles. In September, the system expanded with three new stations at P+R Nowy Bieżanów, P+R Kurdwanów, and P+R Mały Płaszów. By the 2023 season, about 80 bicycles were available. Bicycles were unavailable during winter 2023/2024 for maintenance. In 2024/2025, the number of stations increased from four to seven.

=== System operation ===
Users register and verify their identity via a mobile app. Rentals are free, available only on weekdays during specific hours, and bikes can be parked at any public location in Kraków or Skawina.

== LajkBike ==
Following Wavelo's closure, a short-term rental system, the city introduced LajkBike, a long-term rental system (up to three months) for electric and traditional bicycles. On 2 December 2022, 250 traditional bicycles were delivered, with a total order of 500. In January 2023, Art & Bikes Maria Przedpełska-Najder from Toruń won a tender to supply 250 electric bicycles, with an option for 100–250 more.

Registration began on 17 August 2023, receiving 849 applications for electric bikes and 759 for traditional ones, necessitating a lottery. Bike pickups started on 6 September, with applications paused in September to clear the queue. Applications resumed on 2 January 2024.

== Statistics ==
During BikeOne's 35-day pilot in 2008, 600 users registered, making about 1,000 rentals. In 2009 (1 April to 11 December), there were 39,658 rentals; in 2010 (1 April to 12 December), 47,590; and in 2011 (1 April to 13 October), 60,376. Over three years, about 6,000 users registered.In September 2013, KMK Bike had 9,000 users. In 2014, it had 34,000 active accounts and 300,000 rentals, with similar figures in 2015.

From 23 October 2016 to 22 October 2017, Wavelo recorded 762,000 rentals and 2.5 million km ridden. In winter 2017–2018 (1 December to 28 February), there were over 40,000 rentals. In 2018, there were 987,000 rentals and 3.6 million km ridden, with 41,500 rentals in winter 2018–2019. By mid-June 2019, Wavelo reached two million rentals since its launch. In its first full season (6 May to 30 November 2020), Park-e-Bike recorded 3,000 rentals.In its first year, LajkBike had 3,500 registered users.
