= EnCicla =

Bicycle renting service in Medellín, Colombia

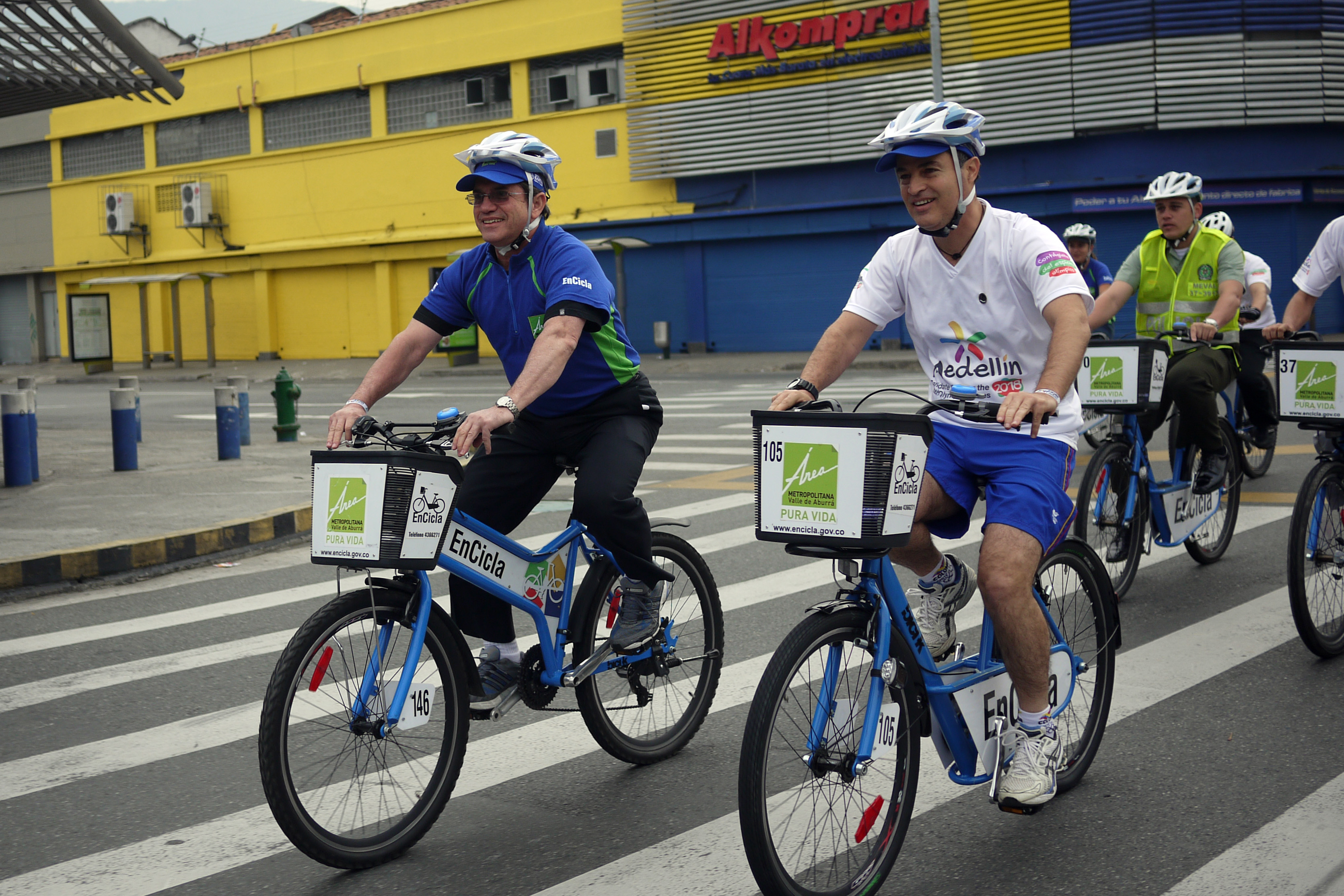
- Ricardo Patiño (left) with Anibal Gaviria Correa (right) touring the metropolitan area on EnCicla bicycles.

Overview
- Area served: Medellín, Colombia
- Transit type: Bicycle-sharing system
- Website: encicla.gov.co

Operation
- Began operation: 2011; 15 years ago

EnCicla is a public bicycle renting service in Medellín, Colombia, which began in 2011. It is one of two the public bike sharing programs in Colombia and was the first such program created in Latin America. It is part of the Aburrá Valley Integrated Transport System (Sistema Integrado de Transporte del Valle de Aburrá, SITVA).

== Description ==
The system consists of over 1,600 bicycles distributed over 90 stations that are strategically located near points of attraction in the city. The system has approximately 9,100 active users and bicycles have been rented over 13 million times since September 2014.

The bicycles are free to use for anyone aged 16 years old or older. Its hours of operation are from 5:30 am to 9:00 pm Monday through Friday. To rent a bicycle, one must first register online on EnCicla's official website. Tourists can present their passports as identification to rent a bike.

Several bike stations are near major universities, including National University of Colombia at Medellín, Pontifical Bolivarian University, and the University of Antioquia. Arví Park has six bicycles stations collectively known as the "Bicycle in the Park" stations.

Due to the complexity of the transport systems in Medellin and the challenges for integrating EnCicla with other modes of transport, such as the Metro, a study by Universidad EAFIT assessed EnCicla as a new bicycle sharing system (BSS) in Medellin, Colombia.

== History ==
The first stage of the bicycle sharing system consisted of 400 bicycles.

== Stations ==
- Moravia
- Universidad
- Route N
- Point Zero
- National University
- Robledo
- SIU-UDEA
- Museum of Antioquia

And more.
