= Aarhus City Bikes =

Public bicycle-sharing system in Aarhus, Denmark

Aarhus Bycykler
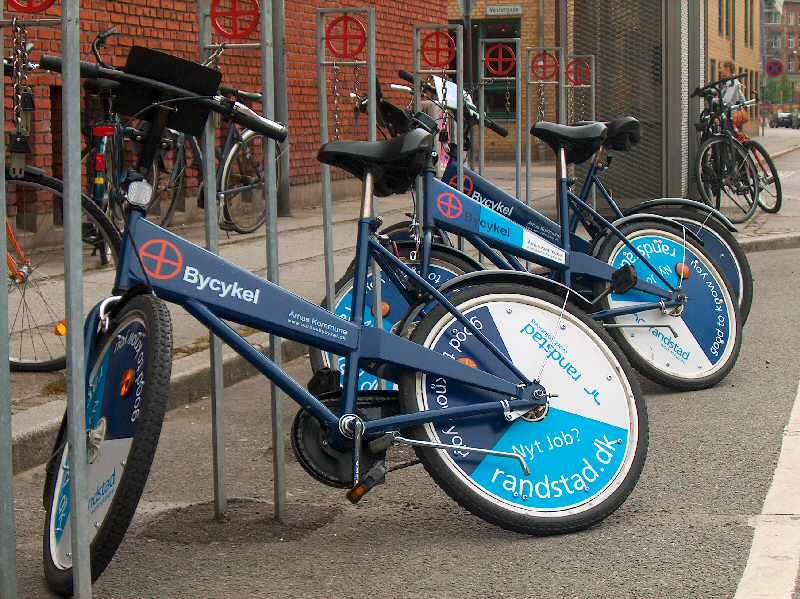

Overview
- Locale: Aarhus, Denmark
- Transit type: Bicycle sharing system
- Number of stations: 52
- Website: Municipal Bycykel Website

Operation
- Began operation: March 2004
- Operator: Aarhus Municipality
- Number of vehicles: 450

Aarhus Bycykler (colloq Bycyklen) is a municipal bicycle sharing system located in Aarhus, Central Region, Denmark. It consists of 450 bicycles at 52 hubs located in the Midtbyen, the University Campus and Trøjborg areas of the city.

The system is operated by Aarhus Municipality using equipment developed by CIOS ApS. The system is free to use requiring a DKK 20 kr. deposit, is maintained by unemployed citizens through municipal work programs and is partially funded through advertising. Due to the hilly terrain of the city all bikes have gears and in 2014 it will gradually transition to lighter aluminum models.

The blue city bikes were removed in 2022 and replaced by orange shared bikes, which are provided by company Donkey Republic.

== History ==
In 2004 Aarhus Municipality put a bicycle sharing program for the city of Aarhus up for a public bid but it was eventually decided to instead run it as public municipal program. The system officially launched in 2004 with 160 bicycles and has since been expanded in stages over the following years. In 2013 a delegation from St. Petersburg visited Aarhus to review the system.
