= EPM Intelligent Building =

Building in Medellín, Colombia

Intelligent Building EPM
- Edificio Intelligente EPM

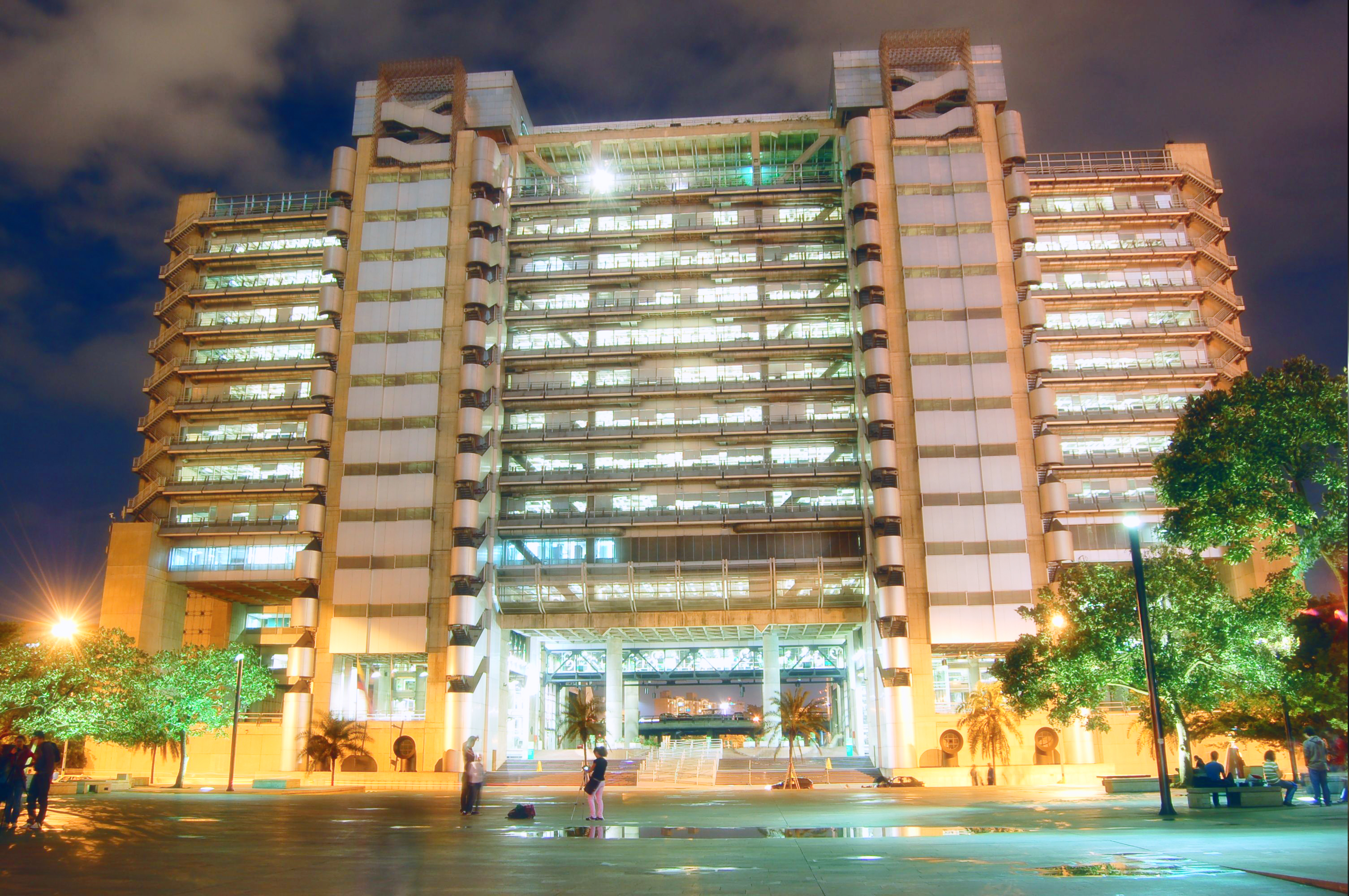
- Interactive map of the Intelligent Building EPM area

General information
- Location: No. 42 - 125, Carrera 58, Medellín, Colombia
- Completed: 1993
- Owner: Empresas Públicas de Medellín

Technical details
- Floor area: 124,289 m^{2} (1,337,840 sq ft)

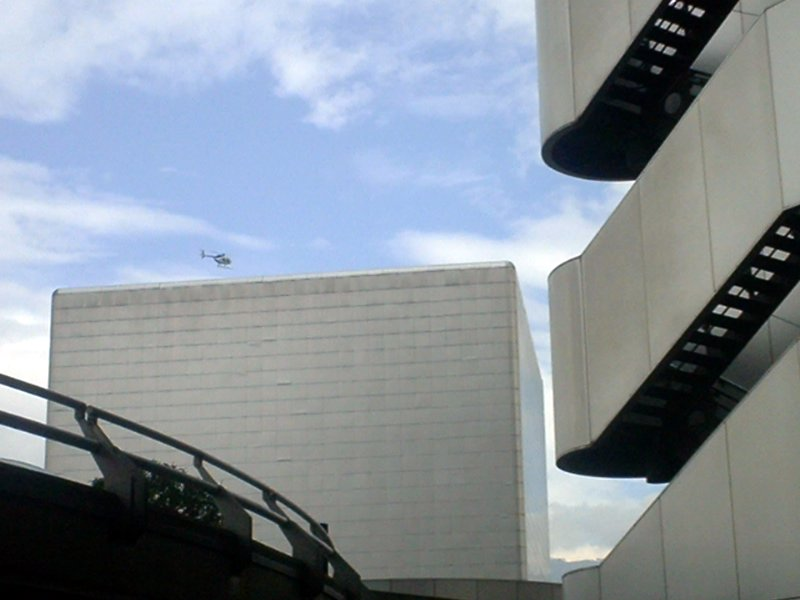
EPM Building's auditorium.

EPM Intelligent Building (Spanish: Edificio Intelligente EPM), also known simply as the EPM Building, is the headquarters for the public utilities company Empresas Públicas de Medellín (EPM) in Medellín, Colombia. The building is located at the intersection of the Avenida del Rio and Carrera 58, in a neighborhood known as La Alpujarra II. The building is surrounding by greenspace, a series of outdoor fountains, and a stand-alone cube near the building that houses an auditorium. Its modern architecture and construction has made it a symbol of contemporary Medellín. Plaza Mayor, Barefoot Park, and the Medellín Metropolitan Theatre are also nearby.

The building is modeled after the Lloyd's building, which houses the Lloyd's of London insurance market in the United Kingdom.

The EPM Building is one of the locations decorated with lights each year for the Christmas season in Medellín.

== History ==
Empresas Públicas de Medellín was founded in 1955. Since 1957, the main headquarters was located in the Miguel de Aguinaga Building. The construction of a new smart building was completed in 1993. Since the soil survey showed the existence of a barrage of unconsolidated sandy gravel brought by the Medellín River, a plate was covered over the entire area of the building to prevent settlement problems of structural elements and at the same time to respond to the most stringent seismic standards. Between 1996 and 1997, the headquarters was transferred to the new Intelligent Building.

== Design ==
The building is made from concrete, steel, glass and aluminum and it incorporates water as a symbol of life and its mission as a public utilities company. Its design and construction were all the work of Colombian people. EPM employed 6,000 workers for the building's construction. There are six towers attached to the main building.

The building also has 16 transparent elevators, operating simultaneously, which can mobilize 320 people on each trip at a speed of 150 meters per minute. The top floor can therefore be reached in 60 seconds. The 11th floor has a rooftop garden with vertical garden walls. These gardens were composed with at least 60% plant species native to Colombia.

Separated from the main building on its northwest side is a 27-meter high cube that houses the auditorium. The auditorium can seat 400 people and has an aluminum finish on the outside.

== See also ==
- Interactive Museum EPM
