= Barefoot Park =

Park in Medellín, Colombia

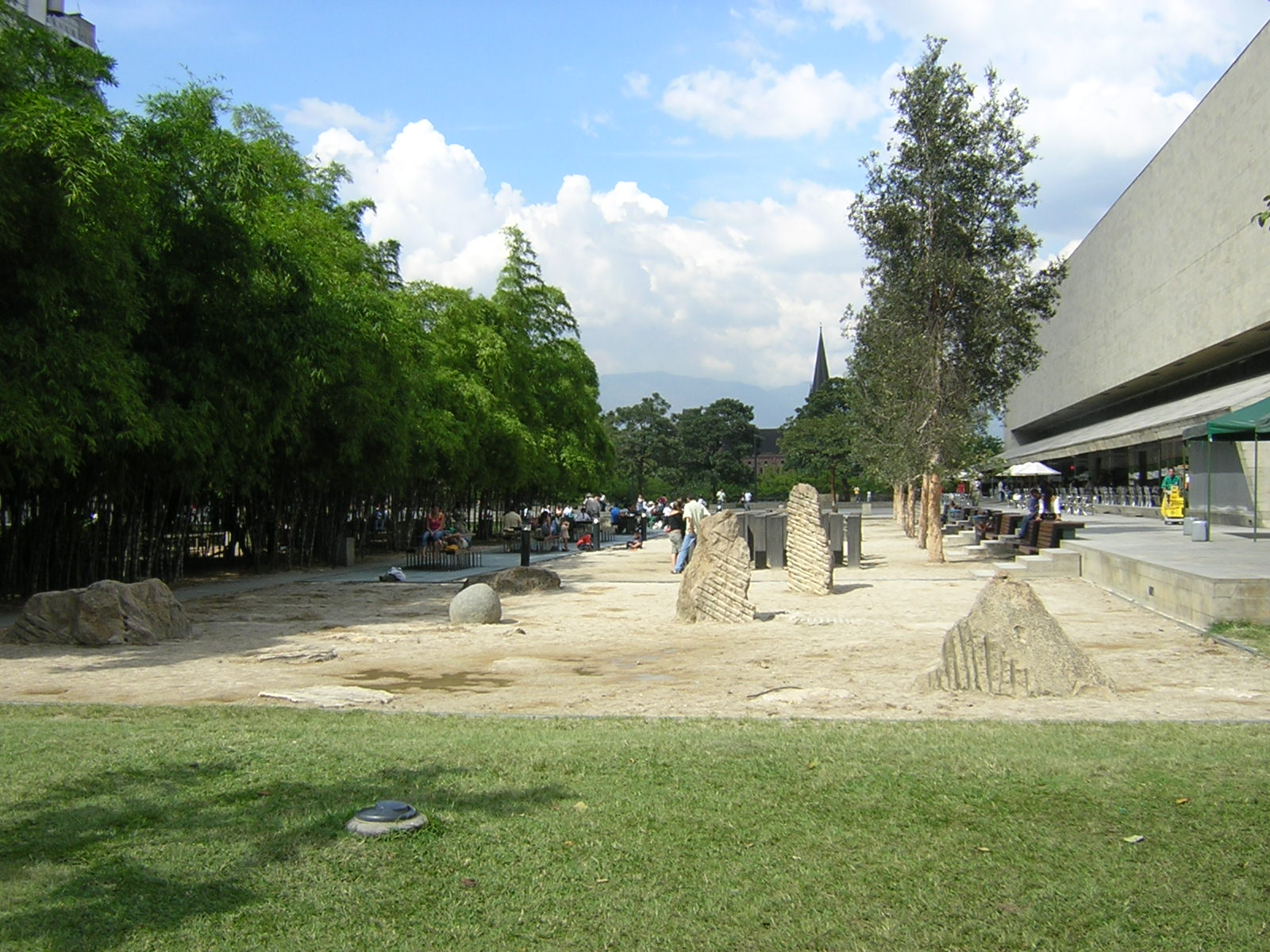
- Interactive map of Barefoot Park
- Location: Medellín, Colombia
- Coordinates: 6°14′41″N 75°34′38″W
- Created: 2000

Barefoot Park (Spanish: Parque de los Pies Descalzos) is a zen-inspired public park in Medellín, Colombia. The park was funded by EPM and designed by architect Felipe Uribe de Bedout. The park includes a green area with gardens and bamboo, a sand area, and an area with water fountains. As suggested by its name, the park is playful in nature. Children and adults are encouraged to play in the park barefoot.

The Barefoot Park was created between 1998 and 2000. It is located in the administrative area of the city, adjacent to the Medellín Metropolitan Theatre, and the Medellín River. The Interactive Museum EPM, an interactive science museum, is part of the park.
