= Christmas lights in Medellín =

Christmas event in Medellín, Colombia

The Lighting of Medellín El Alumbrado Navideño de Medellín
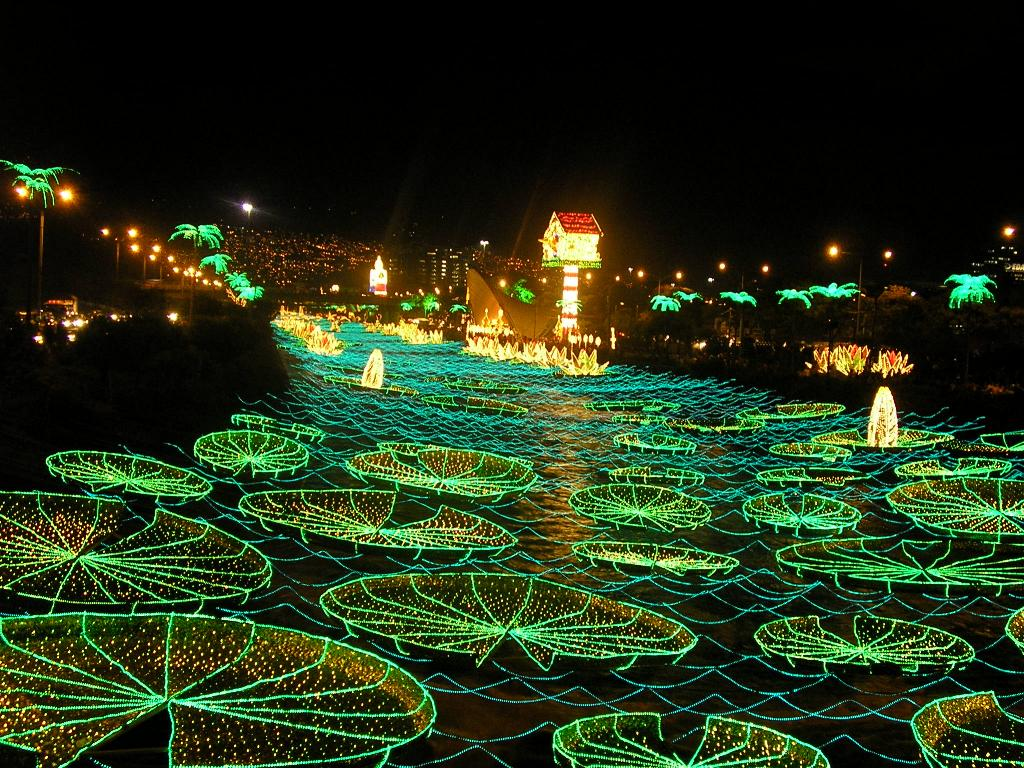
- Festival lights on the Medellín River in 2004
- Also called: EPM Lights (Alumbrados EPM)
- Type: Christian, cultural
- Frequency: Annual

Christmas lights in Medellín, known in Spanish simply as the "Lighting" (El Alumbrado) or more officially the EPM Lights (Alumbrados EPM), is a traditional seasonal event in Medellín, Colombia, where the city hangs millions of Christmas lights and holds light shows and other cultural events. Since the 1990s, the main locations of the lights have been on and around the Medellín River and La Playa Avenue, although the event has expanded to include over one hundred other locations around the city. The event usually lasts from the beginning of December until the beginning of January, and the lights are designed and sponsored by Empresas Públicas de Medellín (EPM), the city's public utilities company.

Because of its attraction to tourists, the event has gotten bigger each year, with a widening availability of energy resources and budgets, and increasing participation by local citizens. The ceremony traditionally began on 7 December, the Day of the Little Candles and the unofficial start to the Christmas season in Colombia. However, in recent years the lighting has begun sooner to accommodate the increase in tourism. All recreational parks and all the museums have free entry for children under 12 years old, and the Museum of Antioquia admission is free for everyone during this season.

In the month of December 2012, the Lighting of Medellin was selected among the top ten cities to view holiday lights by the National Geographic website.

== Route ==
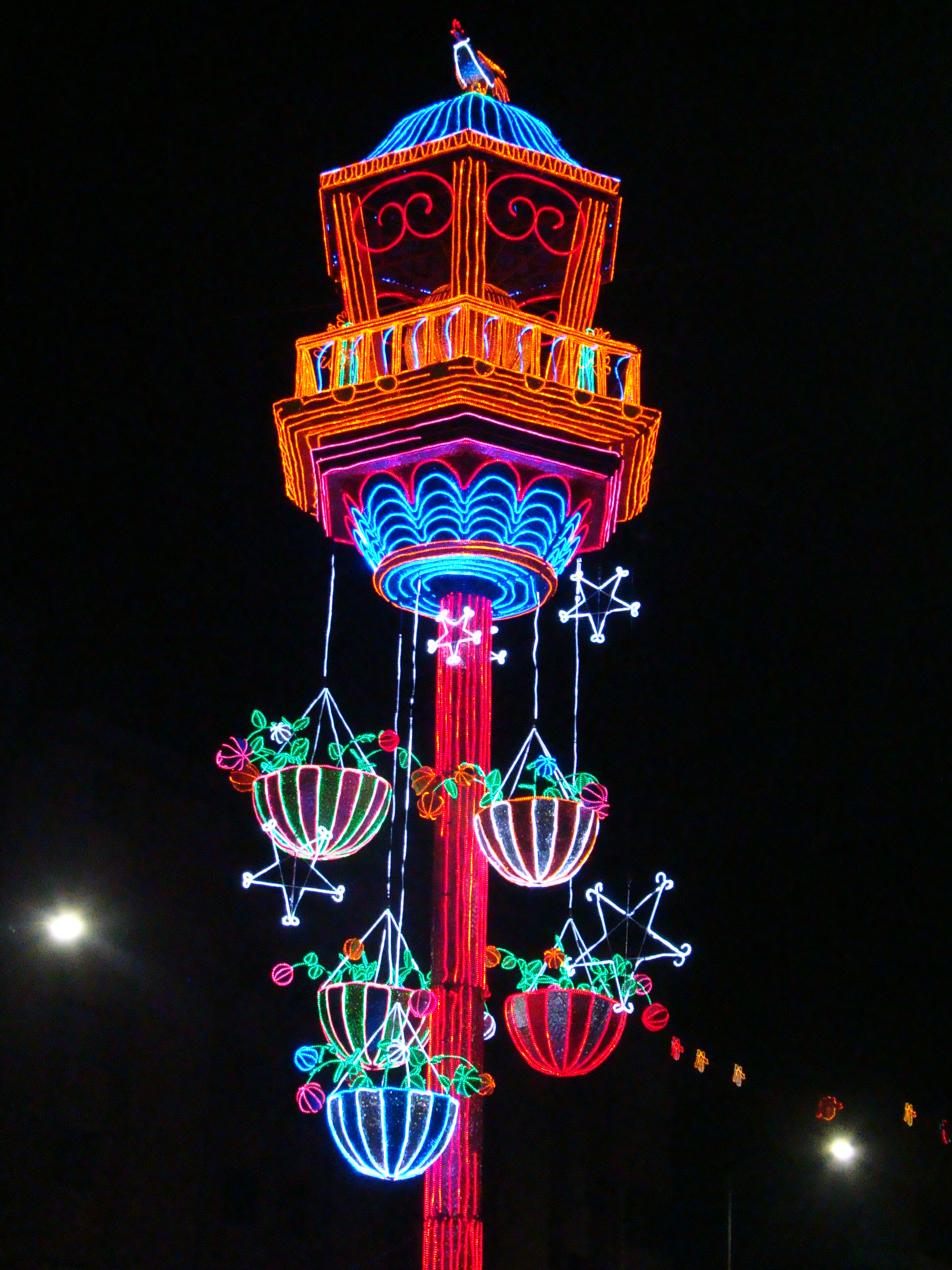
Christmas lights on La Playa Avenue in 2011.

The starting point of the Lighting is on La Playa Avenue, and its main attraction is on the Medellín River. The main route of lighting starts at the Pablo Tobon Uribe Theater, down La Playa to Bolívar Park. Since 2013, a projector there plays videos on the façade of the Metropolitan Cathedral of Medellín. The route then takes Carabobo Street to San Juan Street, then by that road to the Medellin River, and parallel the river, from the San Juan Bridge to the Guayaquil Bridge.

Overall, the Lighting can be viewed from over 100 parks, as well as several other avenues and streets in Medellín. Other notable areas with lights include Botero Park, Nutibara Hill, 70th Street, 80th Street, 33rd Avenue and Las Palmas Road.

== History ==
The first public lighting for Christmas in Medellín took place in 1851 at Plaza Mayor, which today is the location of a large convention center.

The tradition of Christmas lighting in Medellín began again in 1955, when Empresas Públicas de Medellín consolidated as a public utilities company. For the holiday season, part of the city was modestly adorned with special lights jointly contributed by EPM, the government, and the press. Local citizens would go out at 6 p.m. to walk along La Playa Avenue and look at the lights.

By 1967, EPM assumed the role as the creative team for the city's lights each year, and therefore decided their design, installation, and costs. Over time, these lighting systems were broadening in scope and becoming one of the biggest tourist attractions in Medellin in the year-end season. EPM has offered its flagship lights every year since then, only modified in 1992, when the Colombian energy crisis forced EPM to suspend the lighting for that year.

=== Mi Rio Project ===
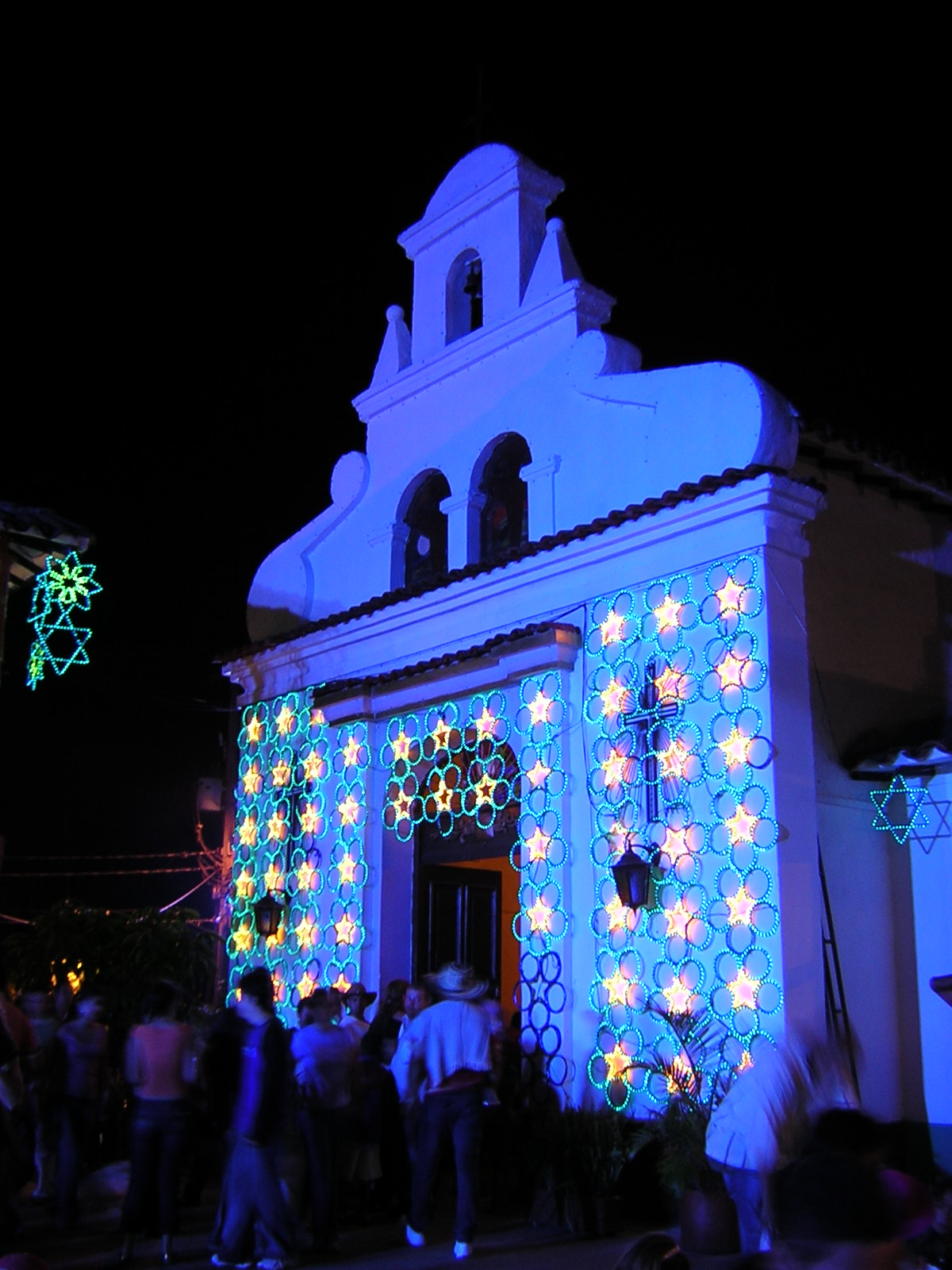
Pueblito Paisa Church on Nutibara Hill in 2006.

In the 1990s, the Medellín government endorsed a strategy of sustainable development for the city, which included a project called Mi Río (My River) that sought to clean up the Medellín River. As part of this plan, citizens living near the river were encouraged to pick the themes for the seasonal Christmas lights that would adorn the city and the river itself. Over time, the avenues along the Medellín River became one of the main points to view the lighting as a result of these plans.

=== 2006-11 Seasons ===
The official slogan for the lights in 2006 was "Colombia is light". EPM invested in 12.5 million lights that year.

In December 2008, EPM used 14.5 million multicolored lights, in addition to rope lights, light projectors, and screens for the holiday design throughout the city, which was estimated to have cost 6,200 million pesos (approx $2.6 million). That year's lighting employed approximately 1,000 people for the season, which lasted from 1 December to 15 January.

For the 2009 season, the Christmas festival began on 5 December. That year, the EPM Intelligent Building debuted a new outdoor fountain. For the Christmas season, the fountain was adorned with sophisticated multimedia effects for color, water movement, and sound.

In 2011, the lighting began on 3 December, four days earlier than usual, to accommodate tourism.

=== 2013 season ===
For the 2013 Christmas season, the city planned to hang over 27 million lights and 472 miles of rope lights in 90 points. The slogan for this year was "Our Christmas" and its theme was the history and traditions of Antioquia. The manager of EPM, Federico Restrepo said that the lights would "highlight Christmas customs and traditions" of the communes and districts. The lighting began on 1 December at 6 p.m. and ended on 6 January.

A 10-minute video was played on the façade of the Metropolitan Cathedral of Medellín in Bolívar Park. In five segments, the video played the history of the construction of the cathedral, the evolution of transportation in Medellin, as well as its art, culture, architecture, wealth of natural resources, and major Christmas attractions. Another show was presented on the western side of the EPM Intelligent Building, called "The Wonders of Colombia". This 12-minute show was narrated by three characters known as Gotica, Copetón and Linda Calle.

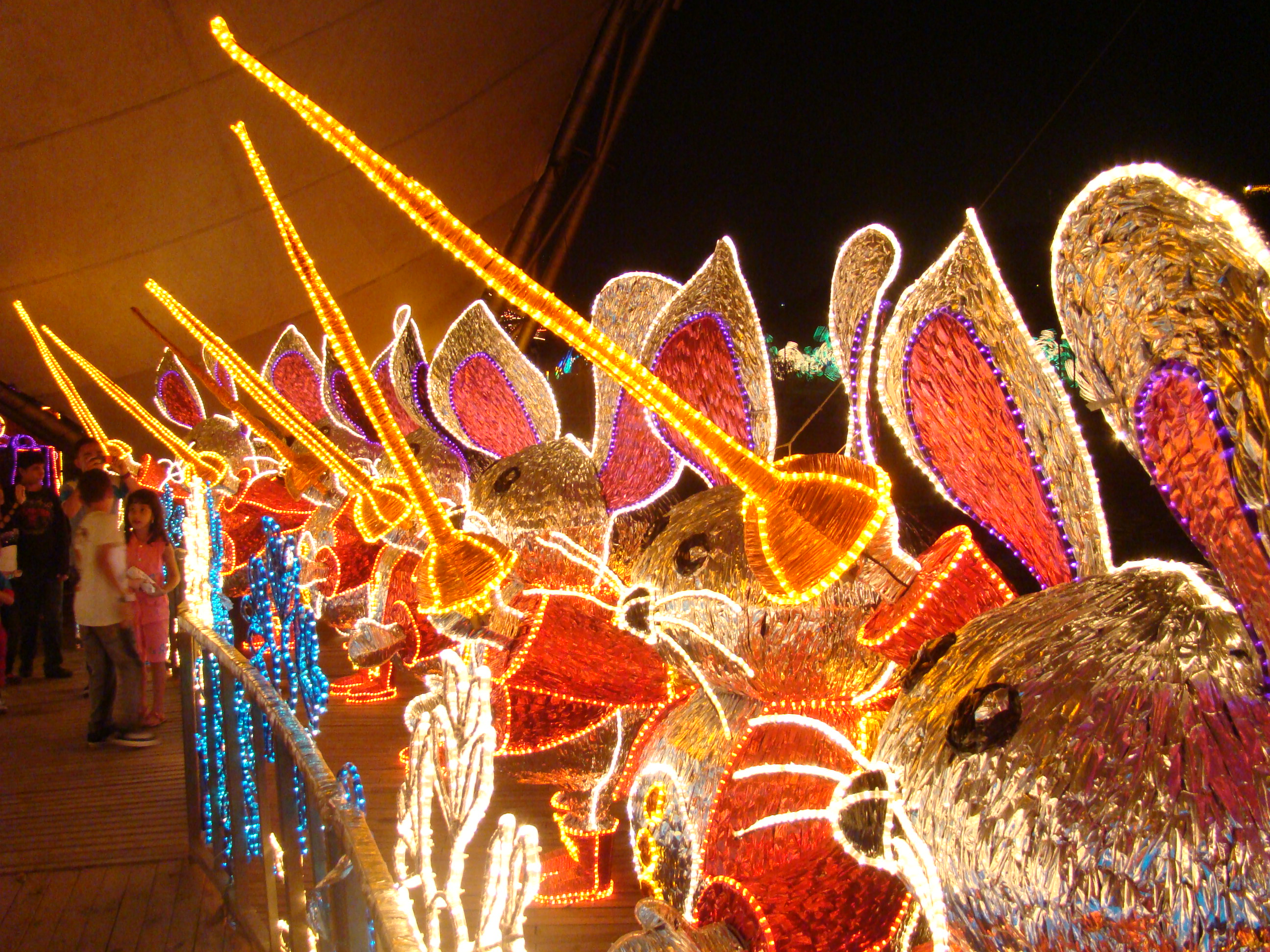
The Lighting along the river in 2010.

On the corner of Oriental Avenue and La Playa, a "House on the Corner" was created out of a metal frame, mesh, paper and LED rope lights. The construction represents the typical architectural style of Antioquian houses. The eastern side of the Guayaquil Bridge featured an interactive water screen that used properties of water conductivity for people to make drawings and figures using sprays, sponges, brushes, pencils or their own hands with the water.

The Alumbrado was visited by approximately 4 million people that year, with approximately 60,000 visitors daily.

=== 2014 season ===
This was the first year that EPM wanted to create a story, and not just a theme, for the Lighting. They asked citizens to submit their ideas for the story's central theme. EPM received 1,555 responses, which predominately featured three concepts: fairy tales, magic worlds, and personal values that can create an equal and peaceful society. EPM chose "values" as the theme and the slogan for this year's Alumbrado is "Values illuminate Christmas". The story they created centers on a girl named Paloma who travels on a boat on the river of peace (the Medellín River) and makes stops along the way on various ports to learn about different human values.

The 2014 celebration began on 29 November at the fountain near EPM's Smart Building. Juan Fernando Sierra was this year's design coordinator. The lighting will have over 30 million LED lights, 800 kilometers of rope lights, 11 tons of metallic decorative paper, and 170 tons of ironwork, among other things. The total cost was about $9 million (21 billion pesos). The festival ran until 12 January 2015.

Again this year, a 10-minute video will be projected onto the façade of the Metropolitan Cathedral of Medellín in Bolívar Park that will play every hour from 6:30 p.m. to 9:30 p.m. This year the video will feature Paloma and her journey on the river.

Interactive, remote views of the river will be available for tablets, desktops, smart phones, and public kiosks located in malls in Oviedo, Puerta del Norte, Unicentro, Explora Park, Viva Laureles, Florida and Premium Plaza. Also for the first time this year, a sector of lighting in the area of Las Palmas, will be powered by solar energy through 100 panels independent of the traditional power grid.

== Gallery ==
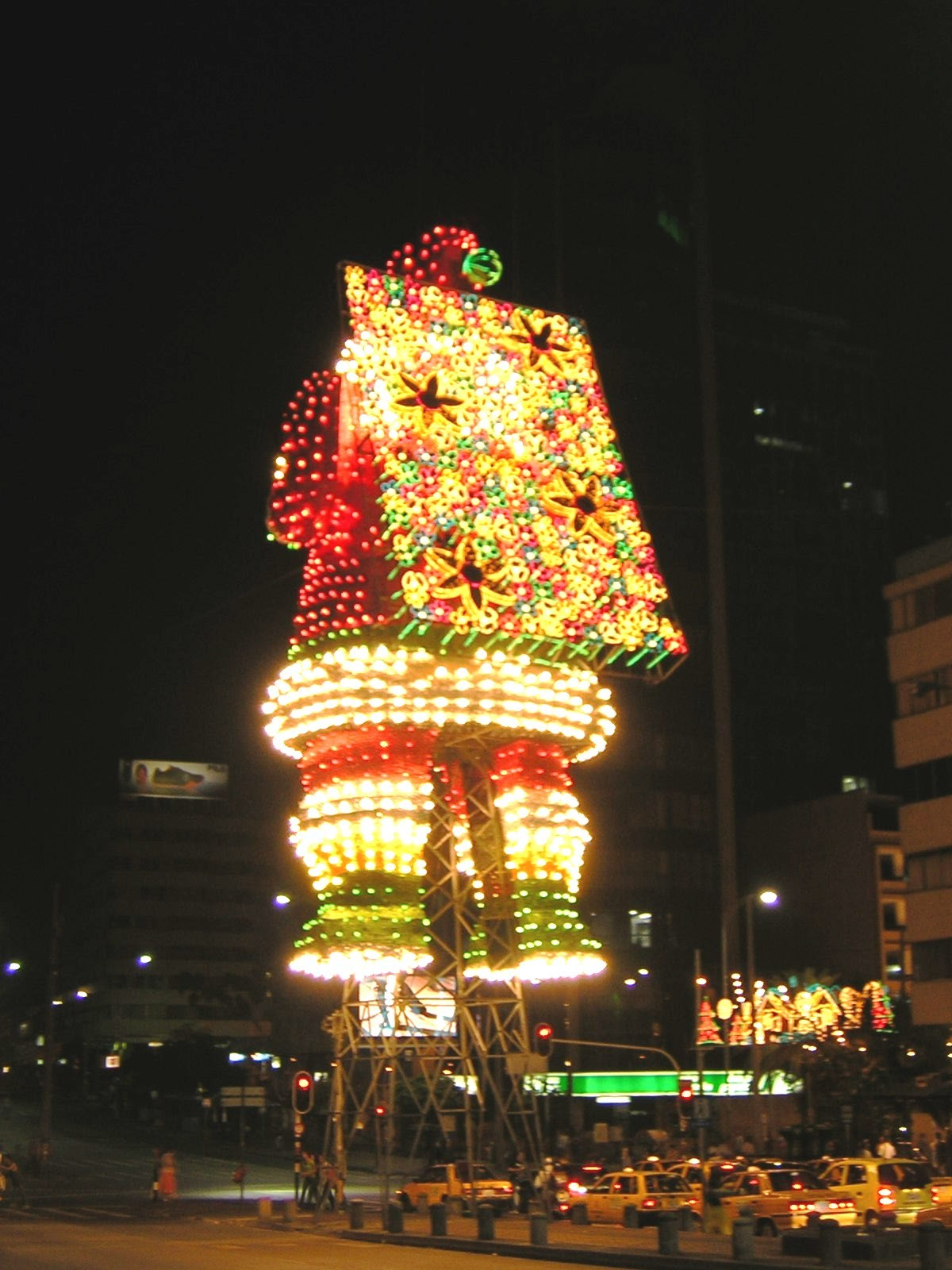
Santa Claus flower carrier

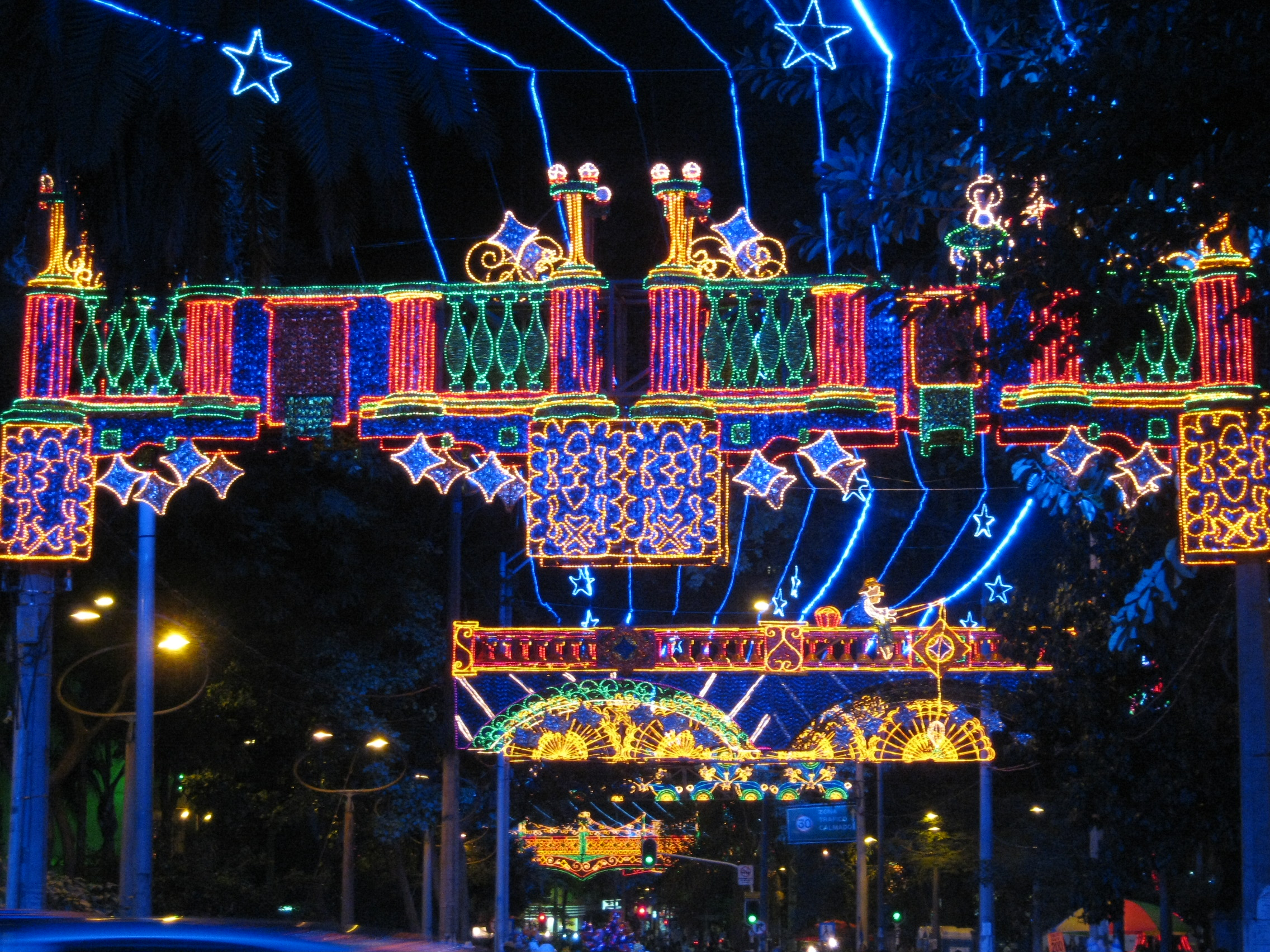
Lights on La Playa Avenue

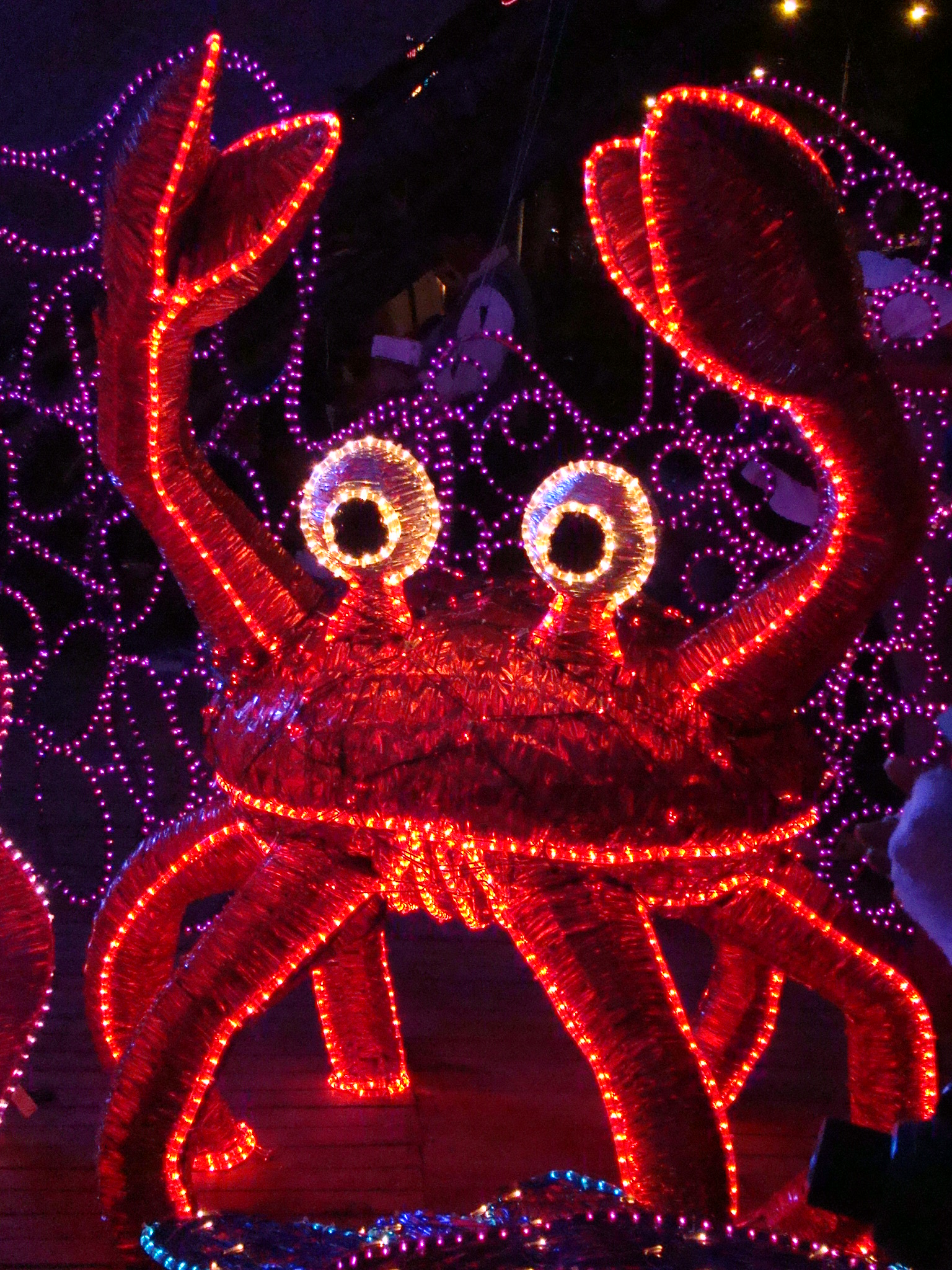
Near the Medellín River

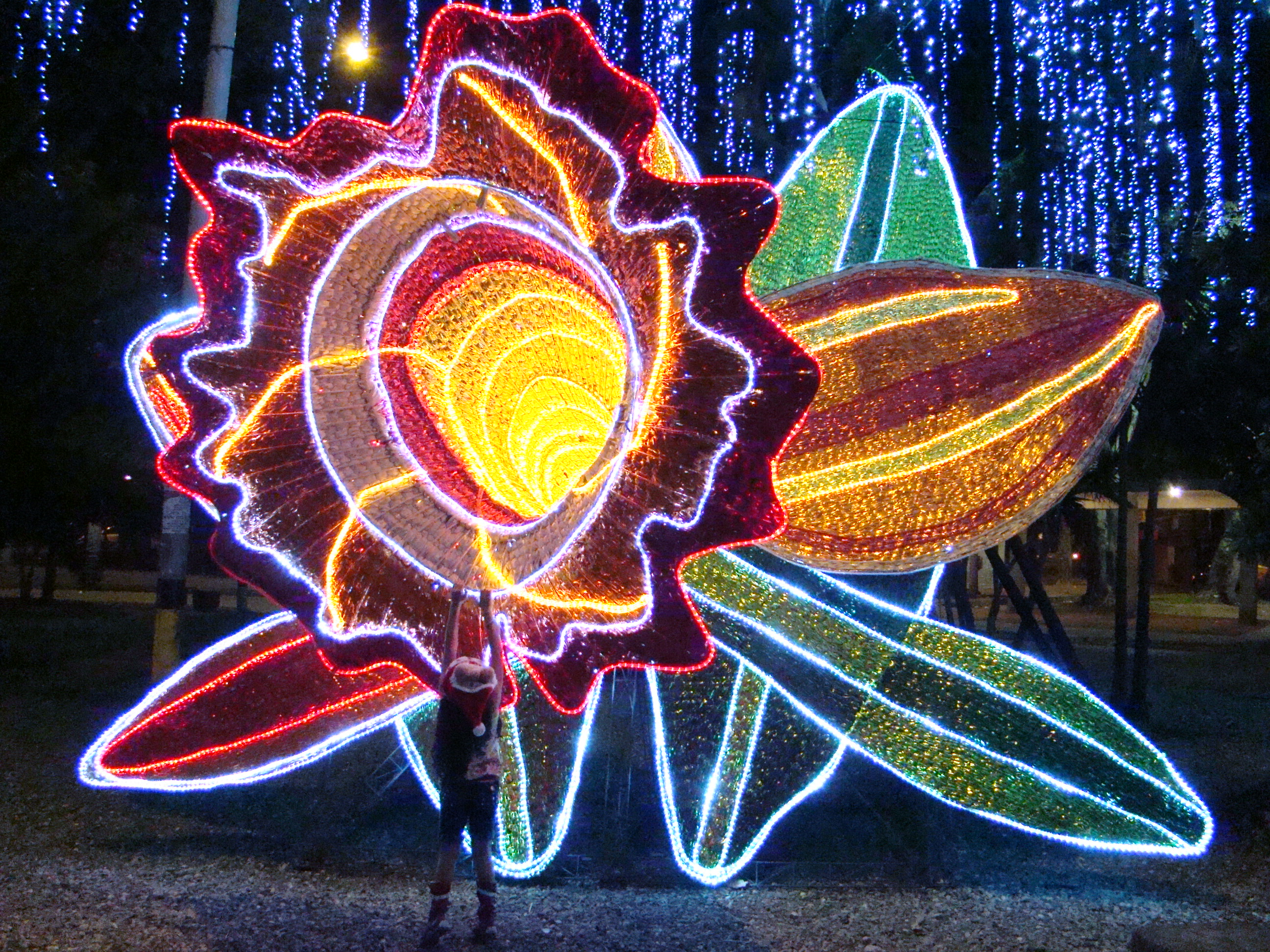
Lights in 2012

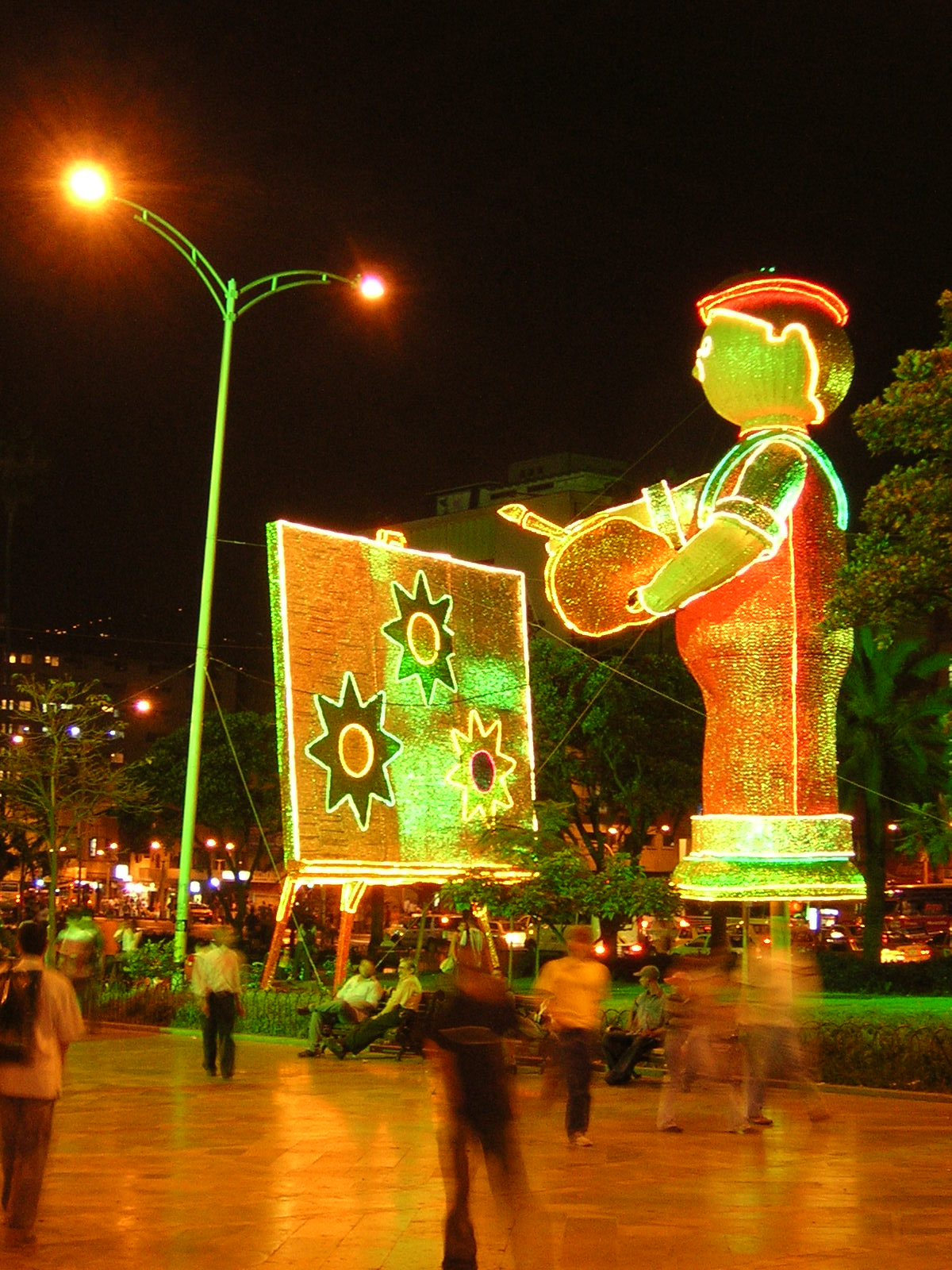
Botero Plaza

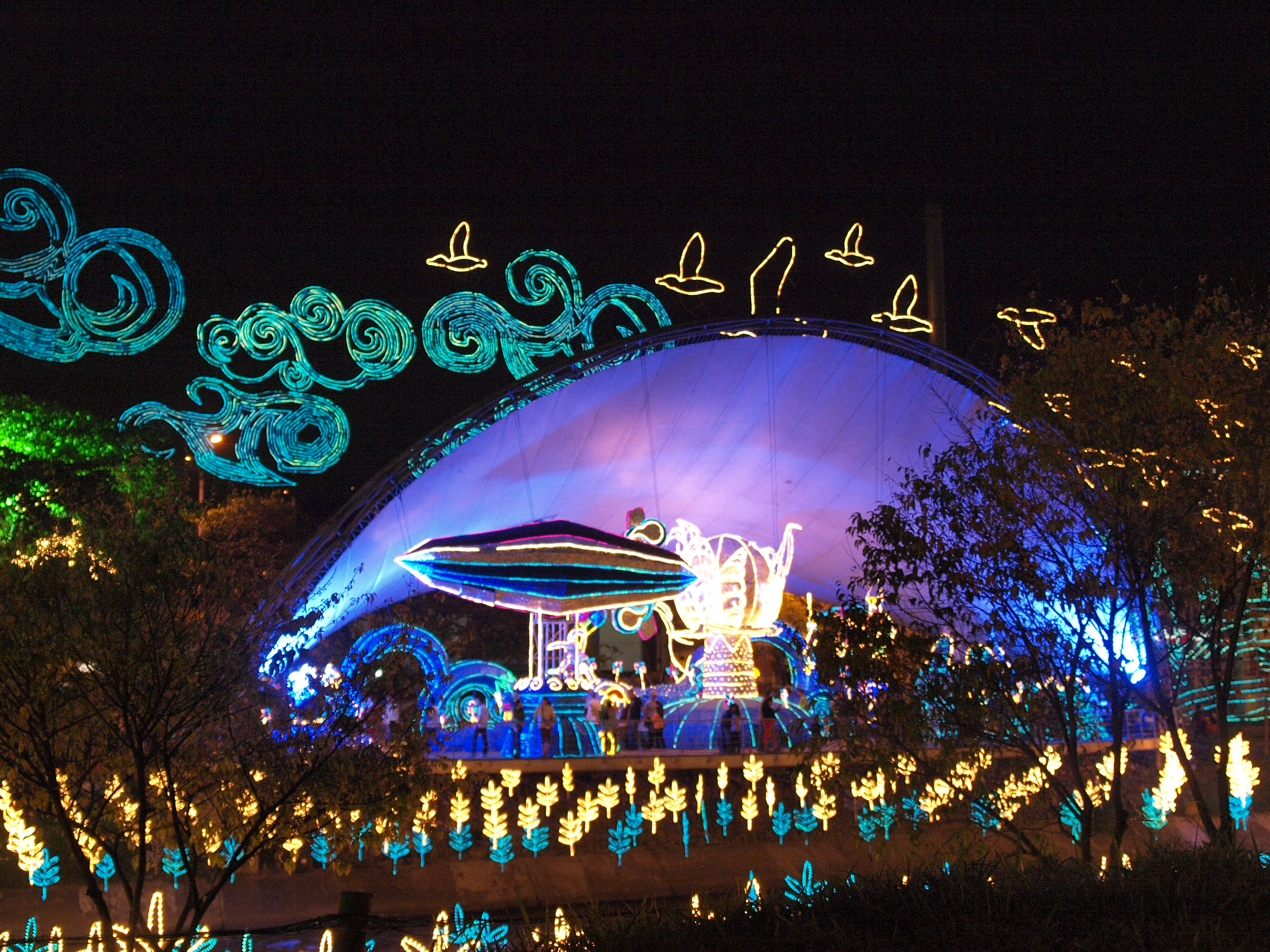
Pavilions along the river

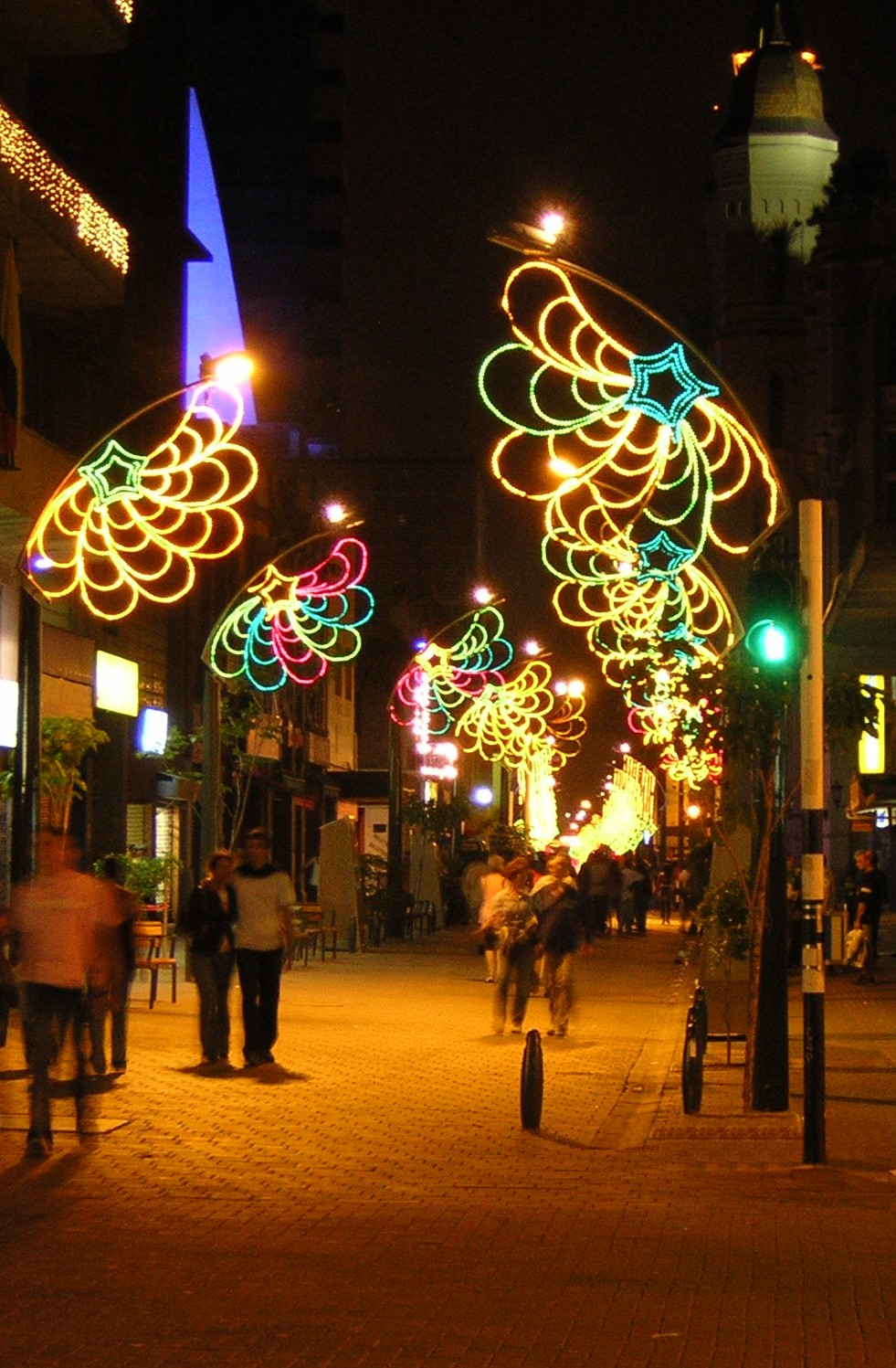
Lights on Carabobo

== See also ==
- Natal Luz
- Festival of Northern Lights
