= Water Museum EPM =

Museum in Medellín, Colombia

Coordinates: 6.2453°N 75.5779°W

- Museo del Agua EPM
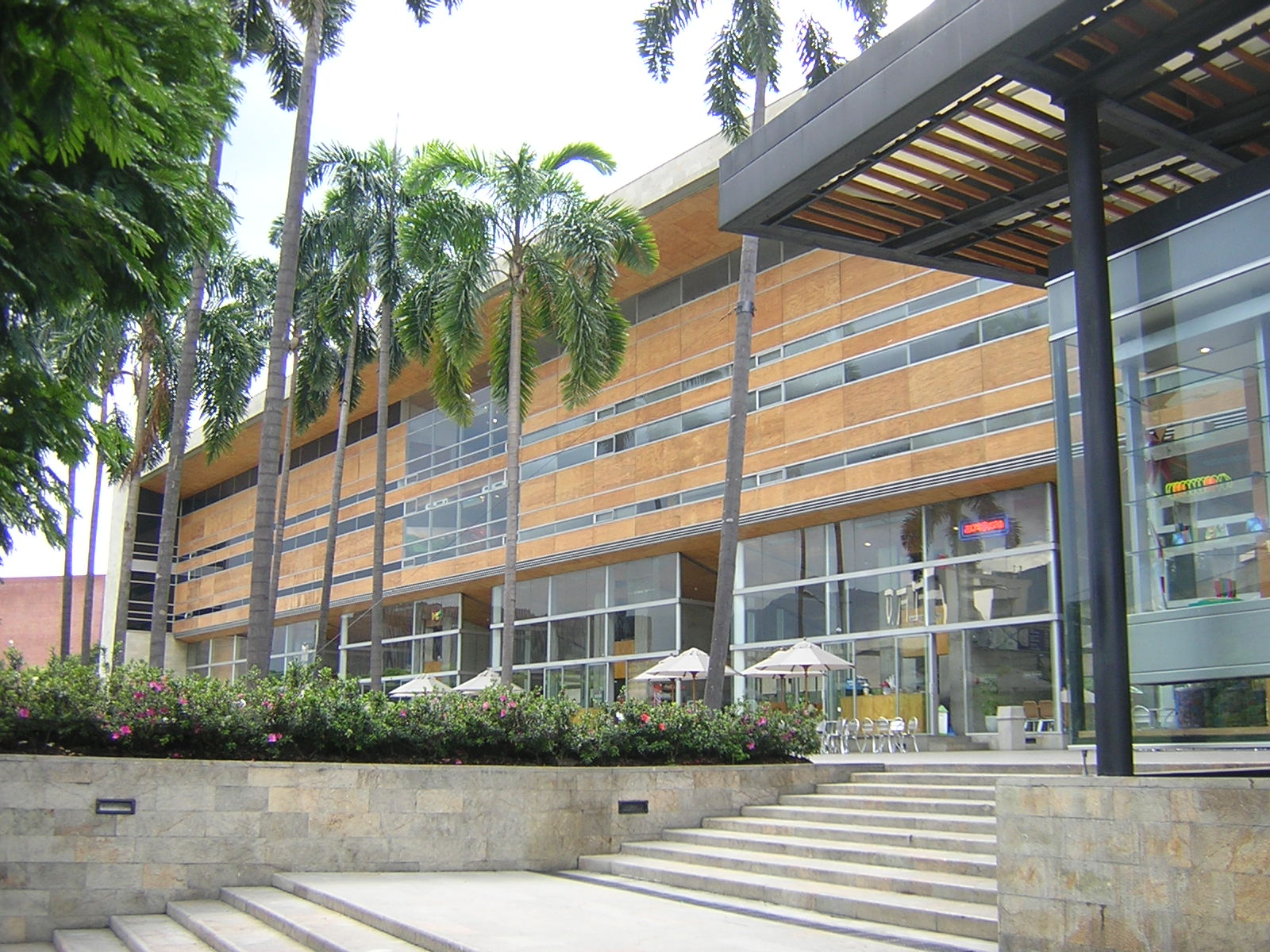
- East facade of the Water Museum EPM
- Location: Medellín, Colombia
- Visitors: 154,000 (2007)
- Director: Clara Patricia Restrepo de Toro
- Website: www.grupo-epm.com/site/museodelagua/

The Water Museum EPM is in Medellín, Colombia. It is part of the Barefoot Park and receives about a 1,000 visitors a day, mostly students. The museum provides an educational tour of 22 rooms spread over four buildings with technology explained in an entertaining way and guests interacting with the physical principles of water, energy, gas and telecommunications. It is funded and managed by Empresas Públicas de Medellín.

== See also ==
- Intelligent Building EPM
