= Empresas Públicas de Medellín =

Public utility company in Colombia

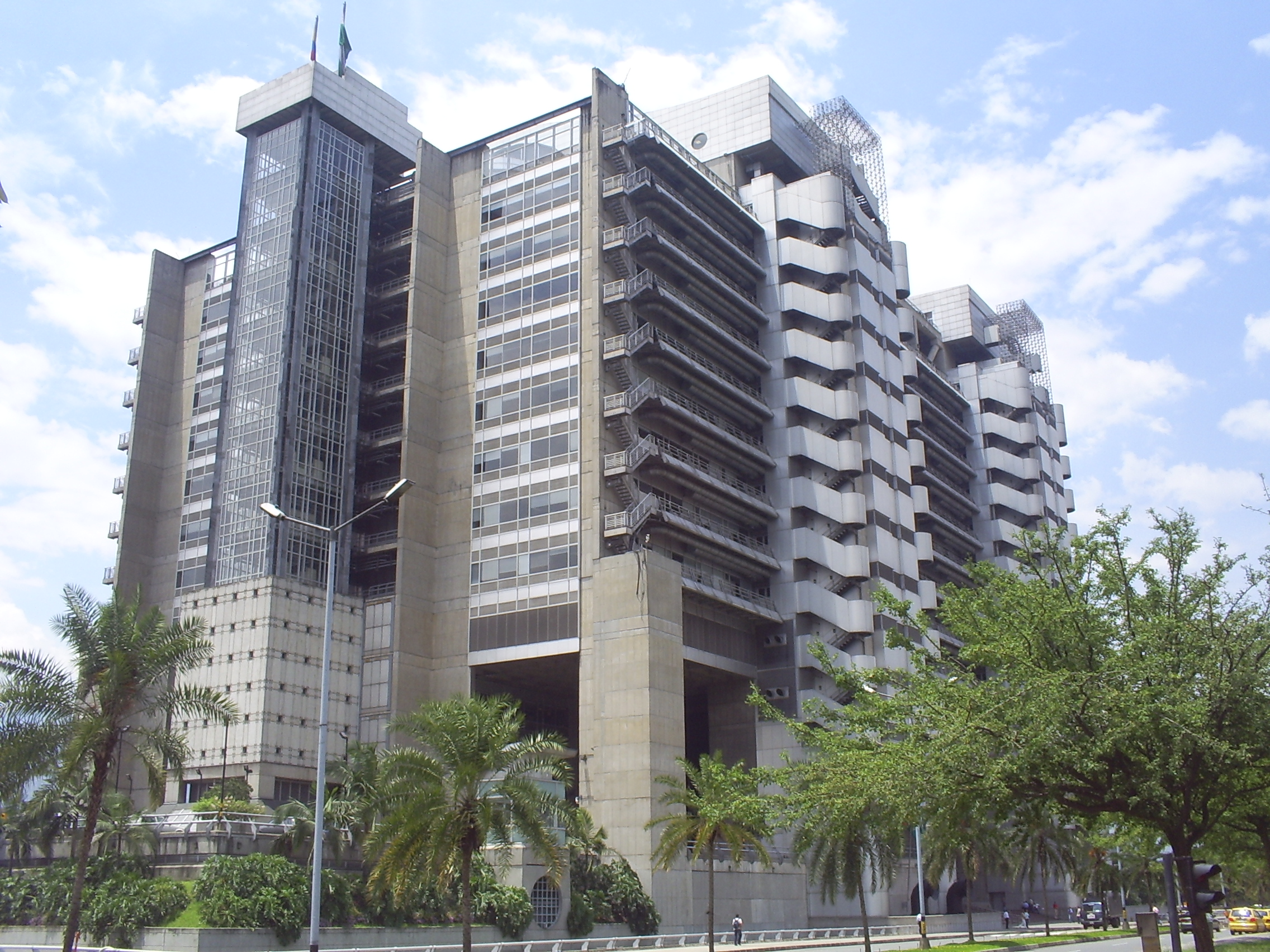
- Company type: Public
- Industry: Public utility service company.
- Founded: November 18, 1955
- Headquarters: Medellín, Colombia
- Key people: John Maya Salazar Chairman
- Products: Water, Energy, Gas & Telecommunications
- Parent: Medellín
- Subsidiaries: -UNE -Regional de Occidente S.A. E.S.P -EPM Bogotá aguas S.A. E.S.P. -EPM Inversiones -Hidroecológica del Teribe S.A. -Aguas Nacionales EPM S.A E.S.P -Aguas de Urabá S.A. E.S.P -Aguas Oriente S.A. E.S.P -Aguas Atrato S.A. E S.P -Aguas Occidente S.A E.S.P -Empresas Públicas de Oriente -Empresa Eléctrica de Guatemala -Empresa de Energía del Quindío S.A. E.S.P (EDEQ) -Centrales Eléctricas del Norte de Santander (CENS) -Central Hidroelétrica de Caldas (CHEC) -Eléctrificadora de Santander (ESSA) -Fundación EPM
- Website: www.epm.com.co

Empresas Públicas de Medellín (EPM) was established on 18 November 1955 as a public utilities company that initially served only the inhabitants of Medellín, Colombia, its hometown.

EPM is the head of a group that consists of twelve companies and has equity participation in eight others in the electricity and water sectors. Its affiliate EPM Telecomunicaciones, which operates under the name UNE, controls seven other companies in various cities across the country.

Organized as a state-owned industrial and commercial enterprise owned by the municipality of Medellín, EPM provides electricity, gas, water, sanitation and telecommunications services.

EPM is present in the following areas of Colombia: Antioquia, Bogotá, Manizales, Armenia, Pereira, Bucaramanga, Cúcuta, Barranquilla, Cartagena, Cali and Quibdó.

Internationally, EPM operates in Panama, where the company is implementing the Bonyic hydroelectric project through its affiliate Hidroecológica del Teribe. In Guadalajara, Mexico, it provides advice and technical assistance for the implementation of potable water, sanitary sewer and wastewater treatment projects. It also provides telecommunications services in the United States and Spain under the UNE brand.

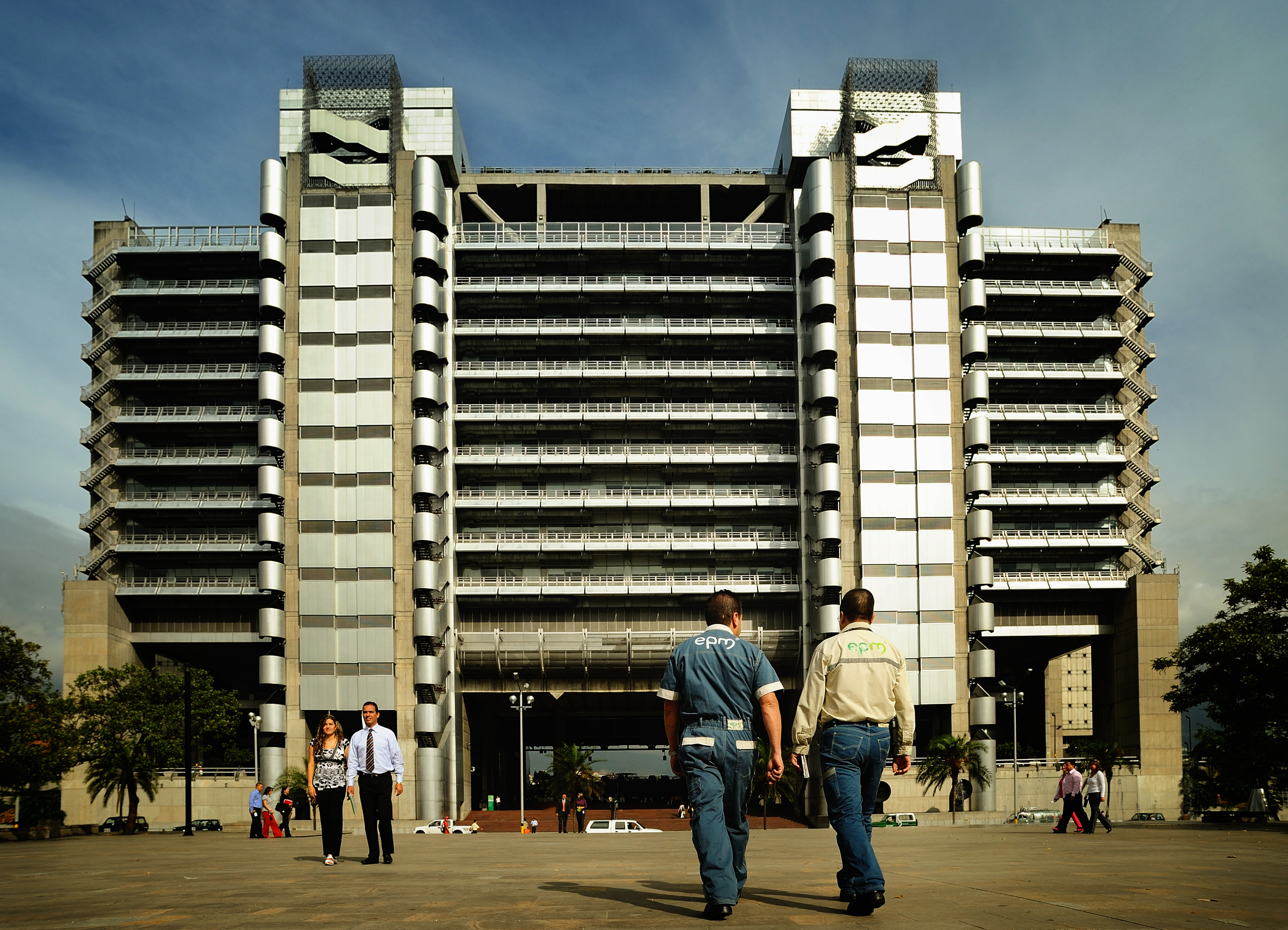
EPM Intelligent Building, the headquarters of EPM.

== Strategic business units ==
Electricity, gas distribution through pipelines, water and telecommunications: EPM operates in these four public utility sectors and is currently implementing a number of projects to consolidate its position in these areas.

=== Energy ===
Research and use of different energy sources, the development of a complete distribution system that reaches every municipality of Antioquia, and the provision of gas over a network are aspects of a company that holds an outstanding place in the Colombian electrical sector, supplying 23.9% share of the demand in the country.

EPM has built the backbone of the hydroelectric system in Colombia. After many years of experience developing hydroelectric projects, EPM has been advancing for more than a decade with research on the use of other energy sources as a way to contribute to the planet's environmental sustainability and to open new areas for its national and international growth.

- Net effective capacity of EPM's generation system: 2597.6 MW, equivalent to 19.34% of the nation's installed generation capacity.
- Distribution system: 22% of the national total.
- Gas over a pipeline: 9% share in the Colombian market.

==== Energy generation ====
- Hydroelectric power stations: 24
- Thermoelectric power stations: 1 (La Sierra thermoelectric power station, municipality of Puerto Nare, Antioquia)
- Wind Farms: 1 (Jepirachi, in the upper Colombian region Guajira)

Porce III and Porce IV, with a capacity of 660 MW and 400 MW respectively, are two of the hydroelectric generation projects currently under construction.

The first generation unit in Porce III will start producing electrical energy at the end of 2010, and around the same time construction of the first civil works for Porce IV will begin. Operations will start in 2015.

In Panama, through its affiliate Hidrológica del Teribe (HET), the Bonyic hydroelectric power station is being built. This power station will be able to generate up to 31.3 MW and will contribute to decrease that country's dependence on imported oil and other fossil fuels that are highly contaminating of the environment.

In Colombia, EPM is also part of the corporation that is working to develop the Hidroituango project, which will have the largest capacity in the country with a total of 2400 MW.

All these projects that consolidate EPM's important role in the Colombian electrical landscape also indicate the path taken in their research on alternative energy sources. For example, the pioneering experience of Jepirachi which uses wind energy, and La Vuelta and La Herradura micro power stations which meet the conditions established by the Kyoto Protocol as a mechanism for clean development.

==== Energy transmission and distribution ====
- Networks: 60,255 km
- Transformers: 90,000
- Substations: 133

EPM brings the magic of light to thousands of people in Antioquia. Its energy transmission and distribution strategic business unit (SBU) transports and sells energy, reaching 1,720,000 homes in 123 municipalities around Antioquia, and in one municipality of Chocó, covering an area of approximately 64,000 km^{2}.

In the rest of Colombia, it provides this utility to 340 municipalities through its affiliates CHEC and EDEQ in the Colombian coffee growing axis, and in the east of the country through two other companies in its portfolio: ESSA and CENS in the Santander Department and Norte de Santander Department, respectively. The company is currently serving 12,000,000 Colombians.

=== Natural Gas ===
- Steel pipelines: 82.9 km
- Polyethylene pipelines: 3811 km
- Regulation stations: 16
- Ringed customers: 798,891
- Connected customers: 474,516

Since 1996, when the pilot stage was implemented, EPM has been providing natural gas service over a pipeline, a safe, economical and environmentally friendly energy alternative which is currently being expanded to the ten municipalities that make up the Aburrá Valley, including Medellín, and other locations around Antioquia.

The service has been diversified to meet the needs of industries, SME's, retailers and transportation providers, in addition to household subscribers. For large industrial companies, EPM expanded its natural gas coverage to the municipalities of Guarne and Rionegro, in the East of Antioquia.

==== Residential natural gas ====
- Households served: 448,286
- SME's and retailers: 6,572

The expansion into other municipalities in Antioquia started in 2009 using the Compressed Natural Gas system: La Ceja, La Unión, and El Retiro.

==== Natural gas for vehicles (VNG) ====
A service that is reflected in an improved quality of air for the metropolitan area of Medellín.

- Vehicles converted to use natural gas in the Aburrá Valley: 30,865
- Service stations: 51

=== Water ===
- Potabilization plants: 10
- Waterworks: 3,580 km
- Waste water collection and transportation networks: 4,315 km
- Coverage: 100% in the urban areas of the Aburrá Valley

Potable water, and waste water collection, transportation, and treatment are the services provided by EPM, throughout the ten municipalities of the Aburrá Valley: Medellín, Bello, Envigado, Itagüí, La Estrella, Sabaneta, Copacabana, Girardota, Caldas and Barbosa, with a total of 919,691 subscribers.

==== Regional companies ====
In addition, in various parts of Antioquia and the country EPM continues to implement the model of regional water systems, with the regional companies for Urabá, the West, Quibdó, and the East of Antioquia.

In an alliance with several institutions in Antioquia, Empresas Públicas de Oriente was recently created to provide waterworks, sewer and sanitation services in several rural and suburban areas in the municipalities of Envigado, Rionegro, and El Retiro.

==== Cleanup of the Medellín River ====
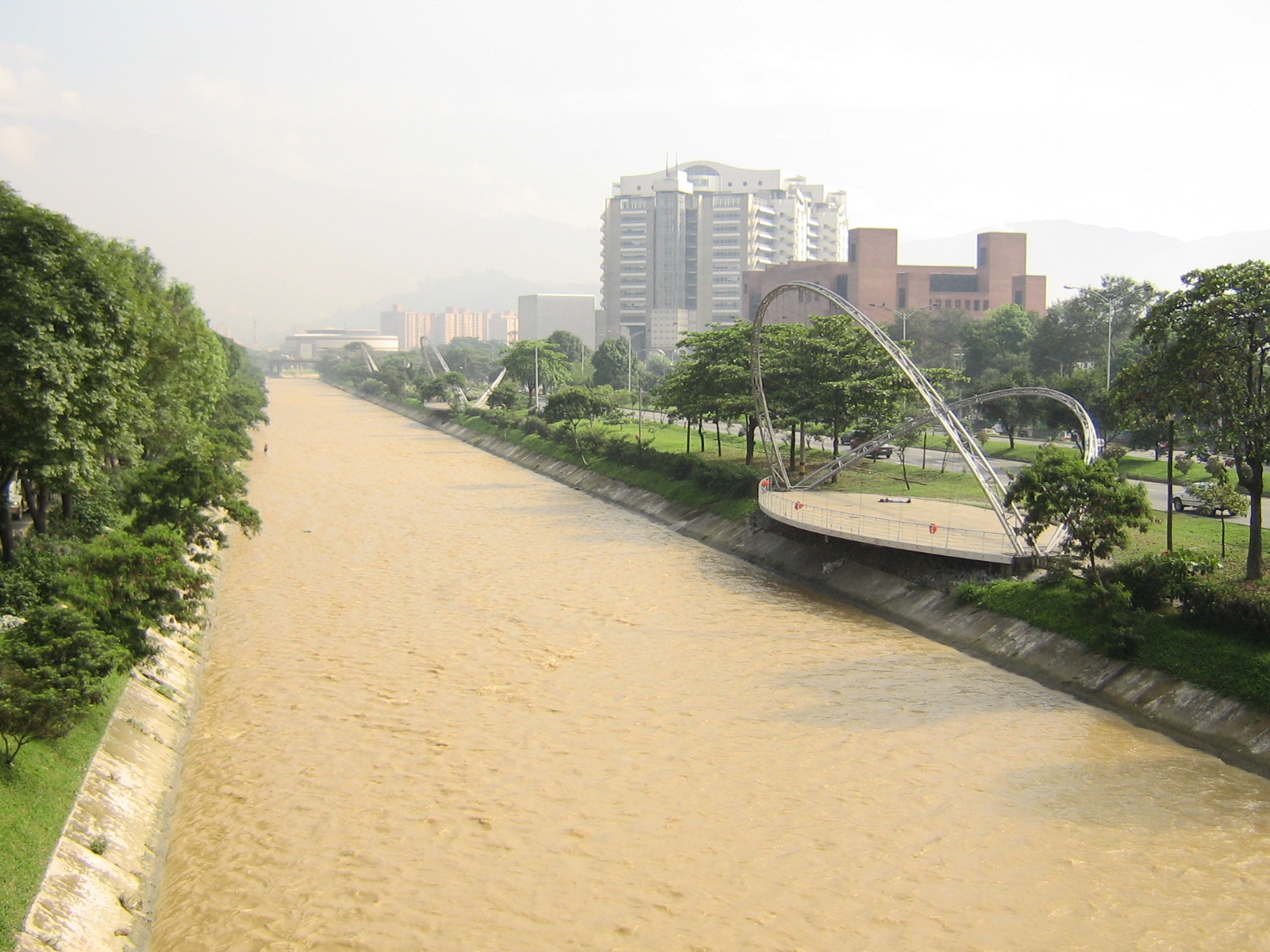
Medellín River. Right and at the bottom: EPM Intelligent Building (gray) and Medellín Metropolitan Theatre (brown)

In order to continue cleaning up the Medellín River, which is the city's most important water body, EPM will start construction of the second waste water treatment plant in the Aburrá Valley.

After ten years of operation, the San Fernando treatment plant, with the capacity to treat 1.8 m/s, the Bello plant will be built in the North, with the capacity to treat 5.0 m/s beginning in 2012.

Also, to transport the waste waters to the new plant, the 8 km long 'North Interceptor' will be built, conceived as an unprecedented engineering work in Antioquia.

=== Telecommunications ===
This is UNE, an EPM Group company.

Including all its affiliates, the company serves close to 70% of the urban population in Colombia.

- Fixed telephony: 2.096,000 lines
- Internet: 563,846 users
- Television: 755,000 users

== EPM Group ==
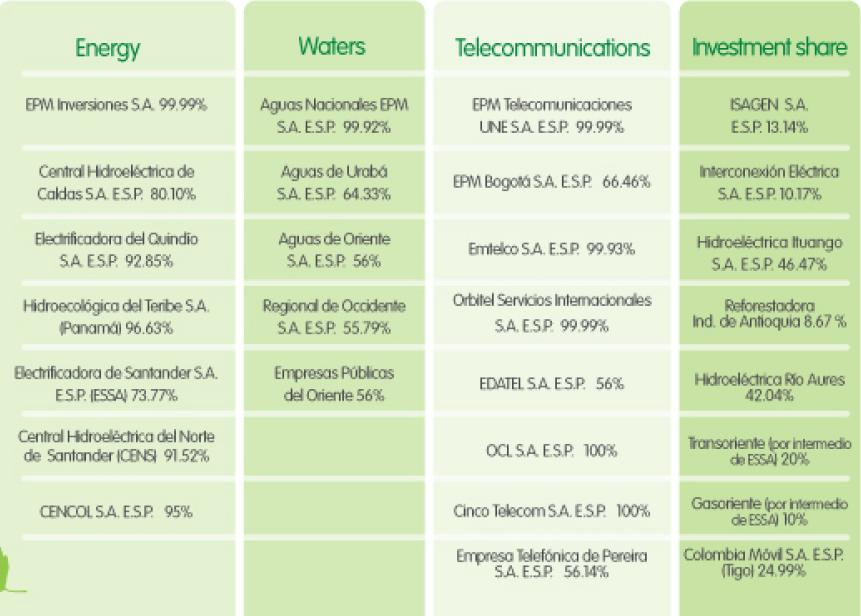
EPM investment briefcase

EPM's investment portfolio consists of seven energy companies, one of them headquartered in Panama, and the promotion of regional waterworks and basic sanitation entities. Its affiliate EPM Telecomunicaciones, heads seven companies in this sector, with operations in Colombia, the United States and Spain.

== Social and education investments ==
Empresas Publicas de Medellín leads the Fondo EPM para la Educacion Superior (EPM's University Education Fund) which benefits more than 3000 students from Medellín and Antioquia. EPM also holds a public library containing a variate collection of engineering books.
