= Botero Plaza =

Park in Medellín, Colombia

- Plaza Botero, Plaza de las Esculturas
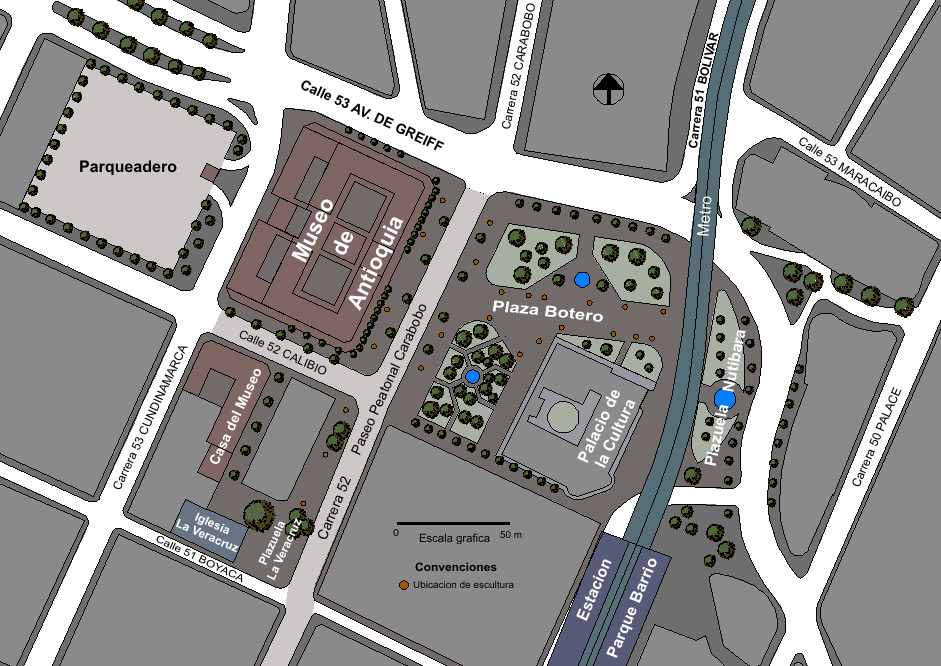
- Interactive map of Botero Plaza
- Type: Sculpture park
- Location: Medellín, Colombia
- Coordinates: 6°15′07″N 75°34′06″W
- Open: 2004

Botero Plaza, surrounded by the Museum of Antioquia and the Rafael Uribe Uribe Palace of Culture, is a 7,000 m^{2} outside park that displays 23 sculptures by Colombian artist Fernando Botero, who donated these and several other artworks for the museum's renovation in 2004. The plaza is located in an area of Medellín, Colombia, known as the "Old Quarter".

== History ==
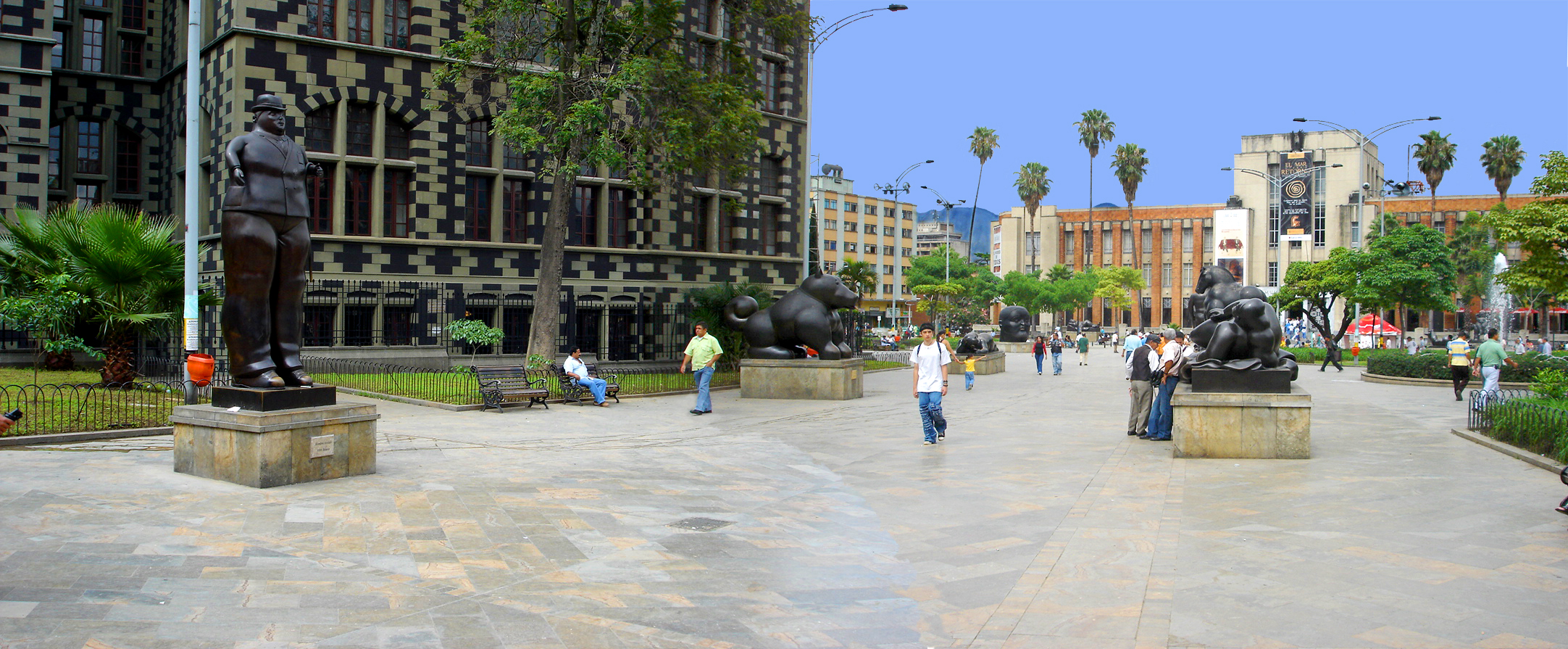
Plaza Botero is a popular tourist site for taking pictures.

Throughout his career, Fernando Botero has donated several artworks to museums in Bogotá and his hometown of Medellín. In 2000, Botero donated 123 pieces of his work and 85 pieces from his personal collection to a museum in Bogotá. This included works from other artists, including works by Chagall, Picasso, Robert Rauschenberg, and the French impressionists. He also donated 119 pieces to the Museum of Antioquia.

Four more of his sculptures can be found in Medellín's Berrío Park and San Antonio Plaza.

== Sculptures ==
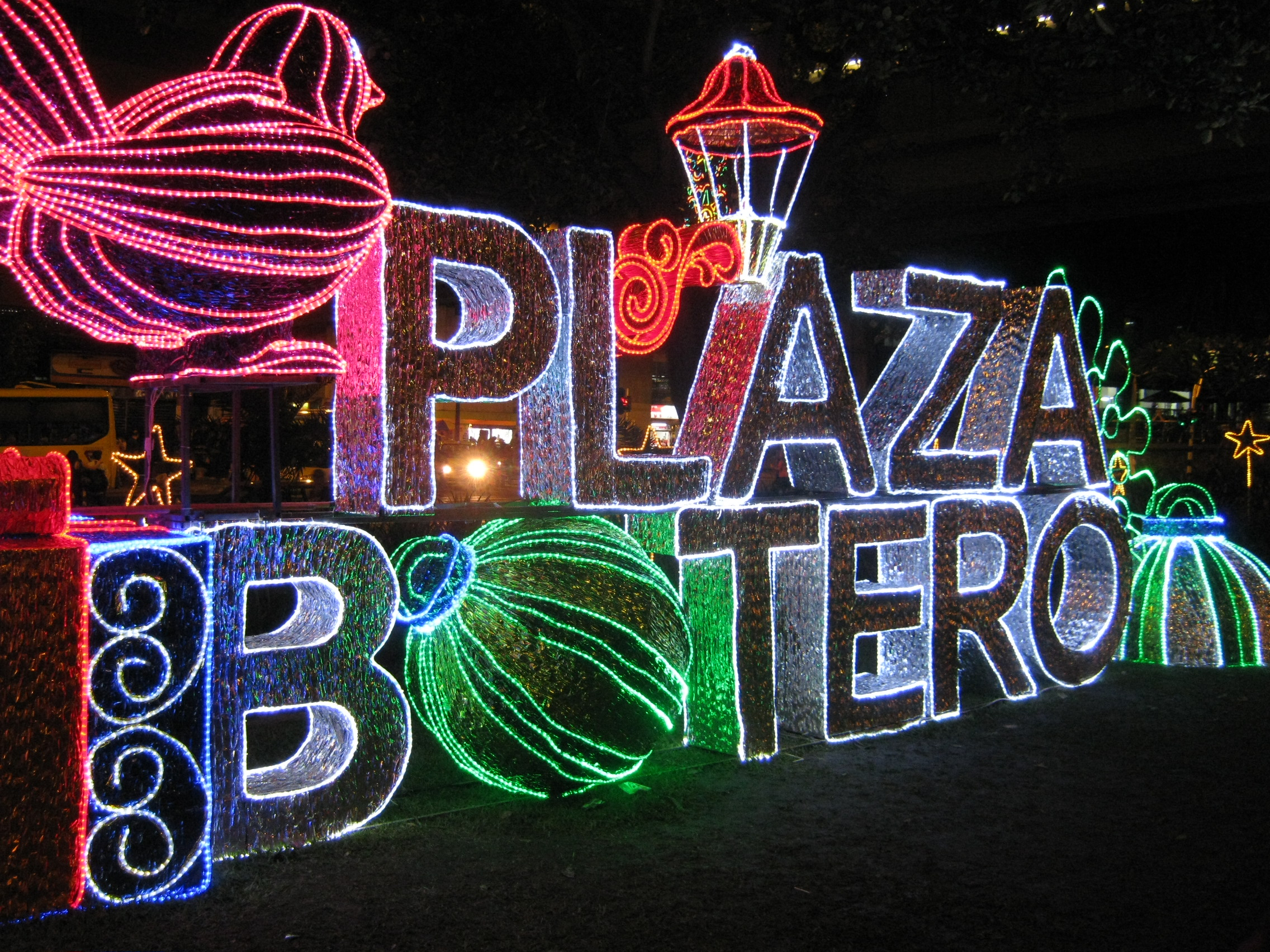
The plaza illuminated during the Christmas season (2011)

The sculptures are all made out of bronze. Many of them were previously housed in museums of Paris, New York, and Madrid. The sculptures tend to have simple names, such as "The Hand", "Eve", "Maternity", "Man on horseback", and "Roman Soldier" to name a few. The "Botero legend" suggests that rubbing the statues brings love and good fortune.

List of statues in the plaza:

- Mano
- Mujer
- Mujer con fruta
- Gato
- Adán
- Eva
- Caballo
- Mujer con espejo
- Mujer sentada
- Perro
- Hombre vestido
- Mujer vestida
- Maternidad
- Esfinge
- Rapto de Europa
- Hombre a caballo
- Mujer reclinada
- Hombre caminante
- Caballo con bridas
- Soldado romano
- Mujer Dormida
- Cabeza
- Pensamiento

== Gallery ==
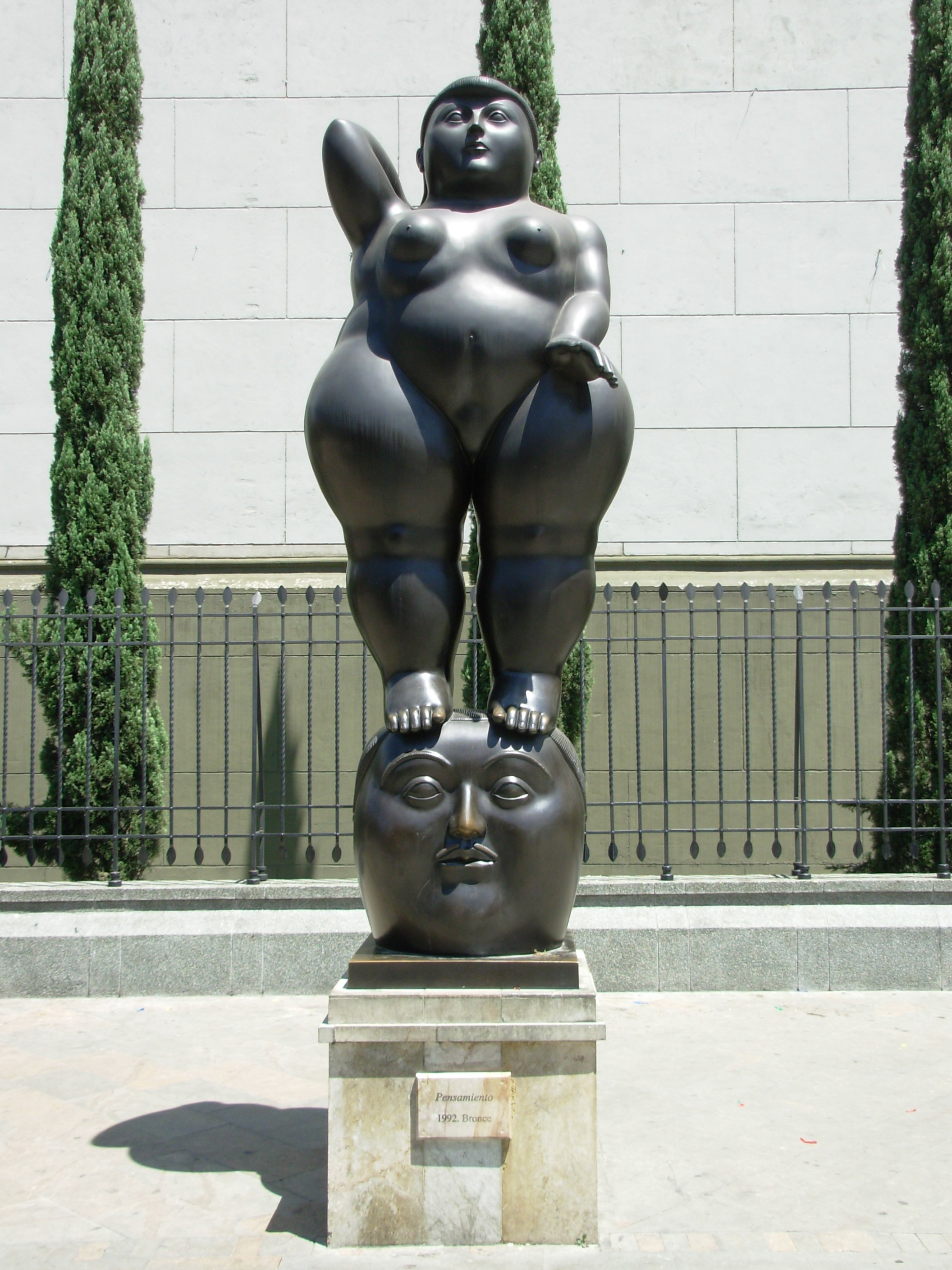
"Thought"

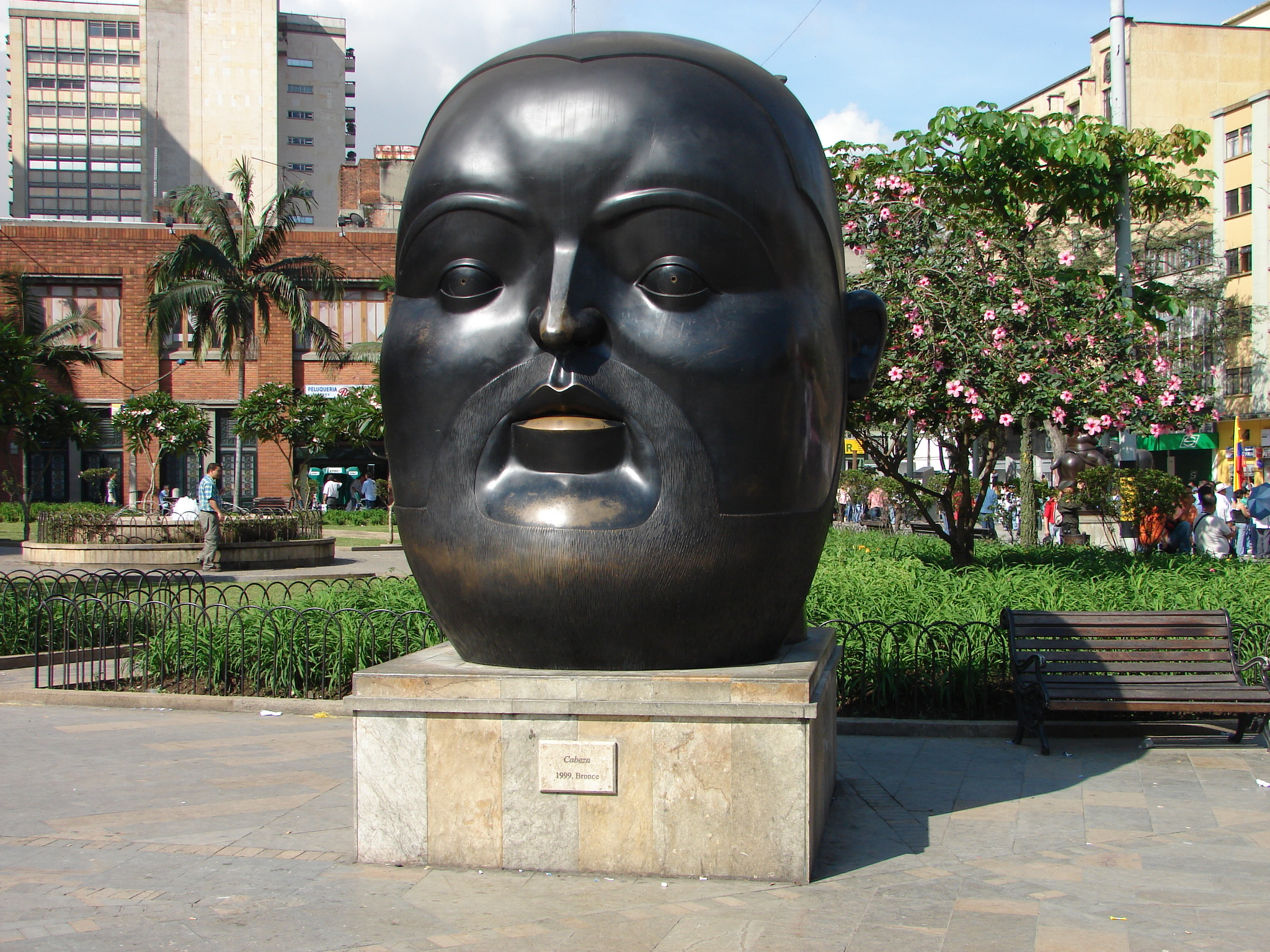
"Head"

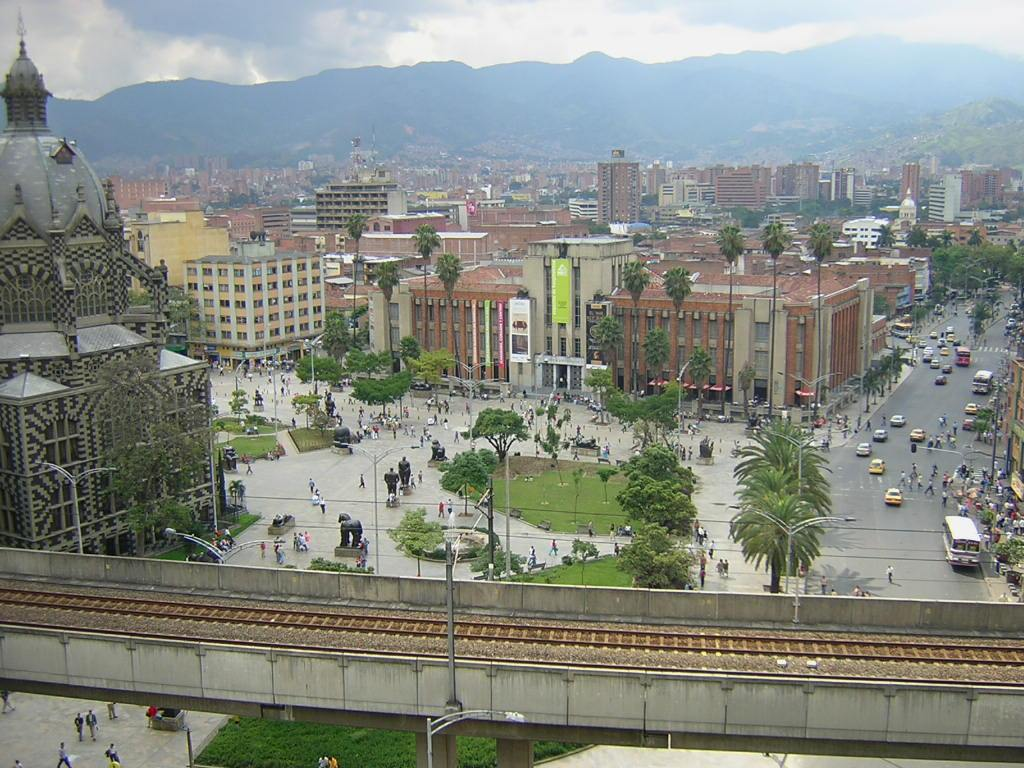
View of museum and plaza

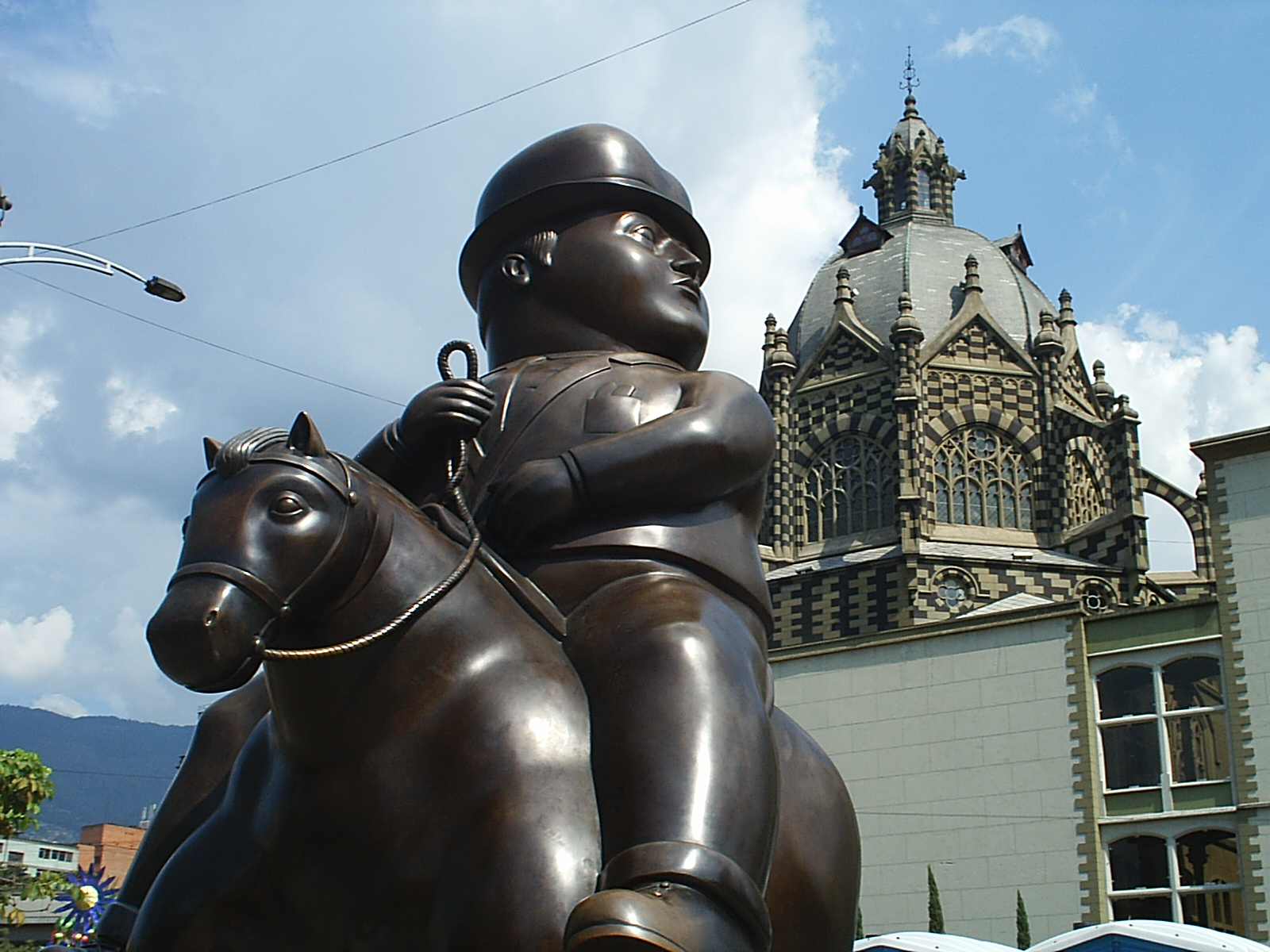
"Man on Horseback"

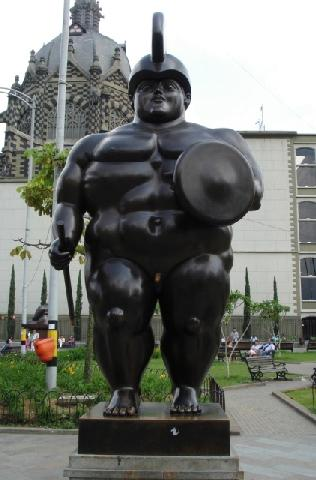
"Roman Soldier"

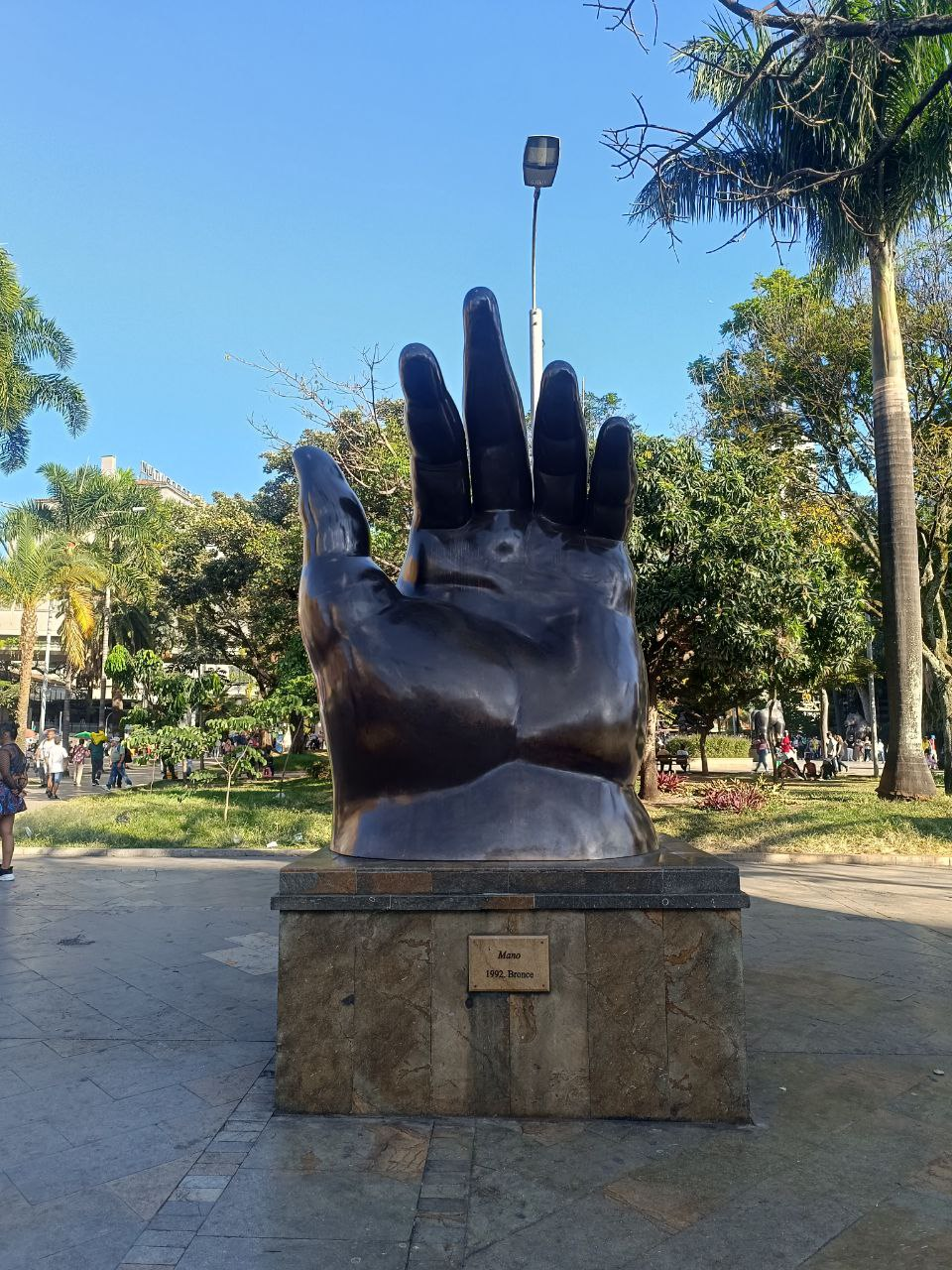
"Hand"

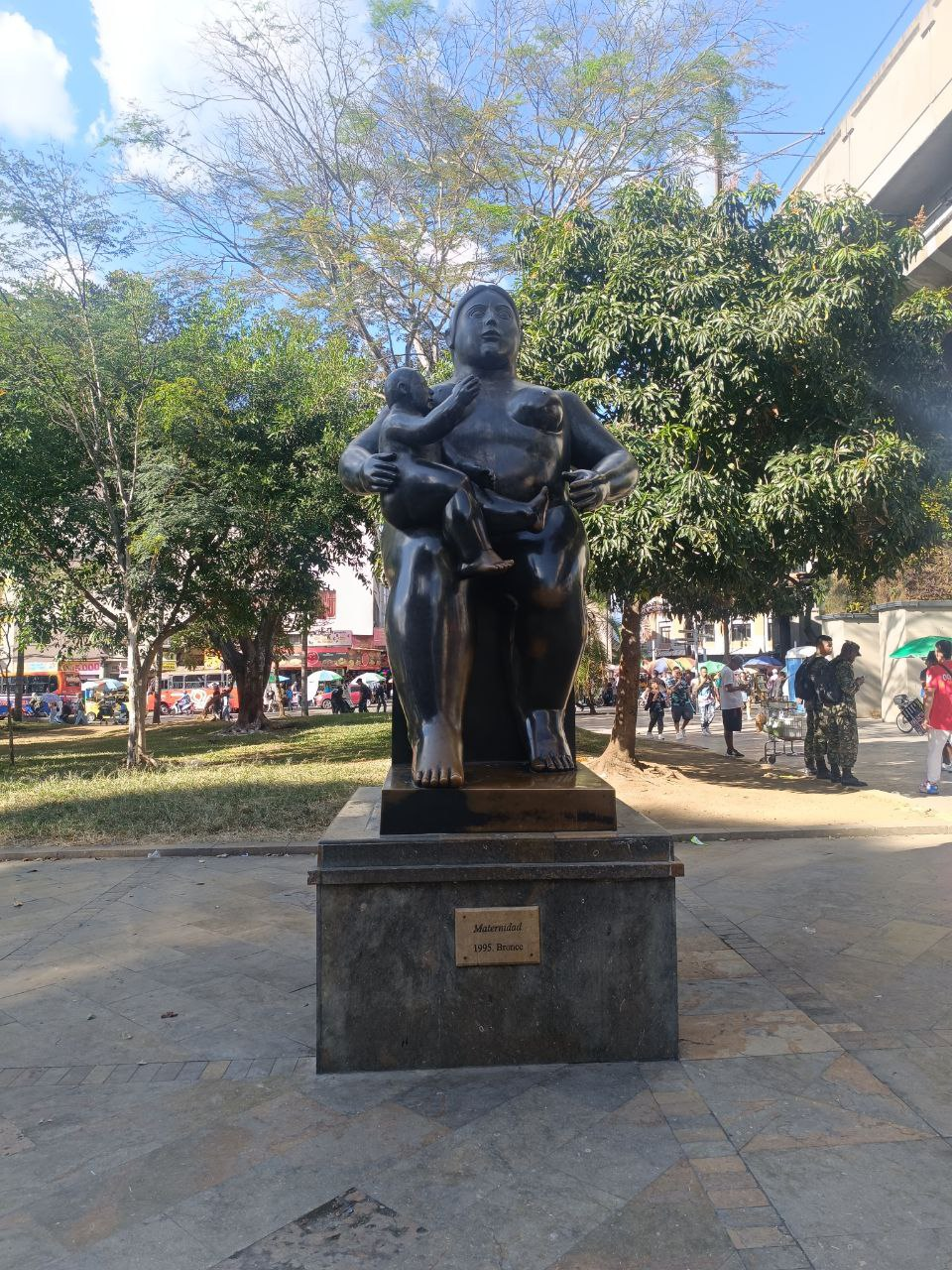
"Maternity"

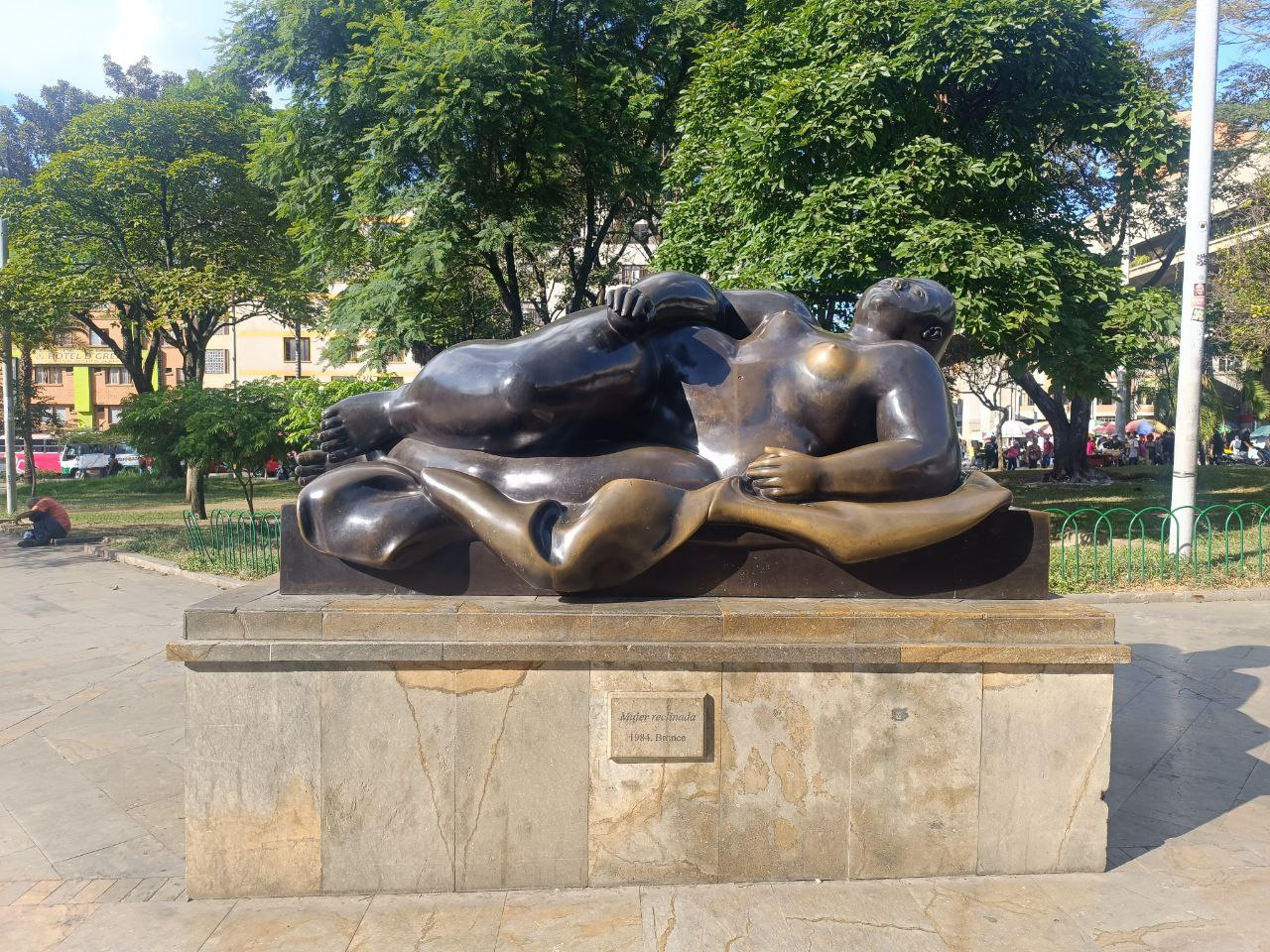
"Mujer reclinada"
