= Porce III Dam =

- Location within Colombia
- Official name: Presa Porce III
- Country: Colombia
- Coordinates: 6°56′19″N 75°8′19″W
- Status: Operational
- Construction began: 2004
- Opening date: 2011
- Owner: Empresas Publicas de Medellin (EPM)

Dam and spillways
- Type of dam: Embankment, concrete-face rock-fill
- Impounds: Porce River
- Height: 151 m (495 ft)
- Length: 426 m (1,398 ft)
- Width (crest): 8 m (26 ft)
- Width (base): 400 m (1,300 ft)
- Dam volume: 4,155,000 m^{3} (146,700,000 cu ft)
- Spillway capacity: 10,850 m^{3}/s (383,000 cu ft/s)

Reservoir
- Total capacity: 170×10^{6} m^{3} (140,000 acre⋅ft)
- Active capacity: 127×10^{6} m^{3} (103,000 acre⋅ft)
- Catchment area: 3,756 km^{2} (1,450 sq mi)
- Surface area: 4.6 km^{2} (1.8 sq mi)

Power Station
- Operator: EPM
- Commission date: 2010-2011
- Turbines: 4 x 172 MW (231,000 hp) Francis-type
- Installed capacity: 660 MW (890,000 hp)
- Annual generation: 3,106 GWh (11,180 TJ)

The Porce III Dam is an embankment dam on the Porce River 90 kilometres (56 mi) northeast of Medellín in Antioquia Department, Colombia. The dam was constructed between 2004 and 2011 for the primary purpose of hydroelectric power generation.

== Background ==
Between 1974 and 1976, hydrological studies were carried out on the Porce River and between 1982 and 1983, studies regarding the river's hydroelectric development were completed. The study recommended the five projects, Porce I, Porce II, Porce III, Porce IV and Ermitaño. In December 1984, the feasibility report for Porce III was submitted and complementary studies were carried out between 1986 and 1996. In 2002, the design and consultancy contracts were awarded along with the environmental license issued. In 2004, construction on the dam began and the river was diverted by 2007. By 2010, the dam began to impound the reservoir and was complete by 2010. Between 2011, all four generators were commissioned.

== Design and operation ==
The Porce III Dam is a 151 metres (495 ft) tall and 426 metres (1,398 ft) long concrete-face rock-fill type embankment dam. Its base width is about 400 metres (1,300 ft) and it has a fill volume of 4,155,000 cubic metres (146,700,000 cu ft). The dam's spillway is a chute-type and is located on its left side. It is controlled by four radial gates and has a maximum discharge of 10,850 cubic metres per second (383,000 cu ft/s). The reservoir created by the dam has a 170,000,000 cubic metres (140,000 acre⋅ft) capacity of which 127,000,000 cubic metres (103,000 acre⋅ft) is active capacity. The reservoir has a surface area of 4.6 square kilometres (1.8 sq mi). The catchment area for the dam and reservoir is 3,756 square kilometres (1,450 sq mi). A submerged intake on the reservoir's left bank conducts water to the power station initially via a 12-metre (39 ft) long and 10.2-metre (33 ft) diameter upper headrace tunnel. At the terminus of this short tunnel, the water drops 149 metres (489 ft) vertical shaft to the lower headrace tunnel which has the same diameter of the upper but is 304 metres (997 ft) long. At the end of the lower headrace, it converts into four penstocks to supply each of the underground power house's 211 megawatts (283,000 hp) Francis turbines with water. Once ejected from the power plant, it enters over 1,000 metres (3,300 ft) of tailrace tunneling and is returned to the Porce River.

== See also ==
- List of power stations in Colombia
