= Parque Explora =

Coordinates: 6.2706°N 75.5656°W

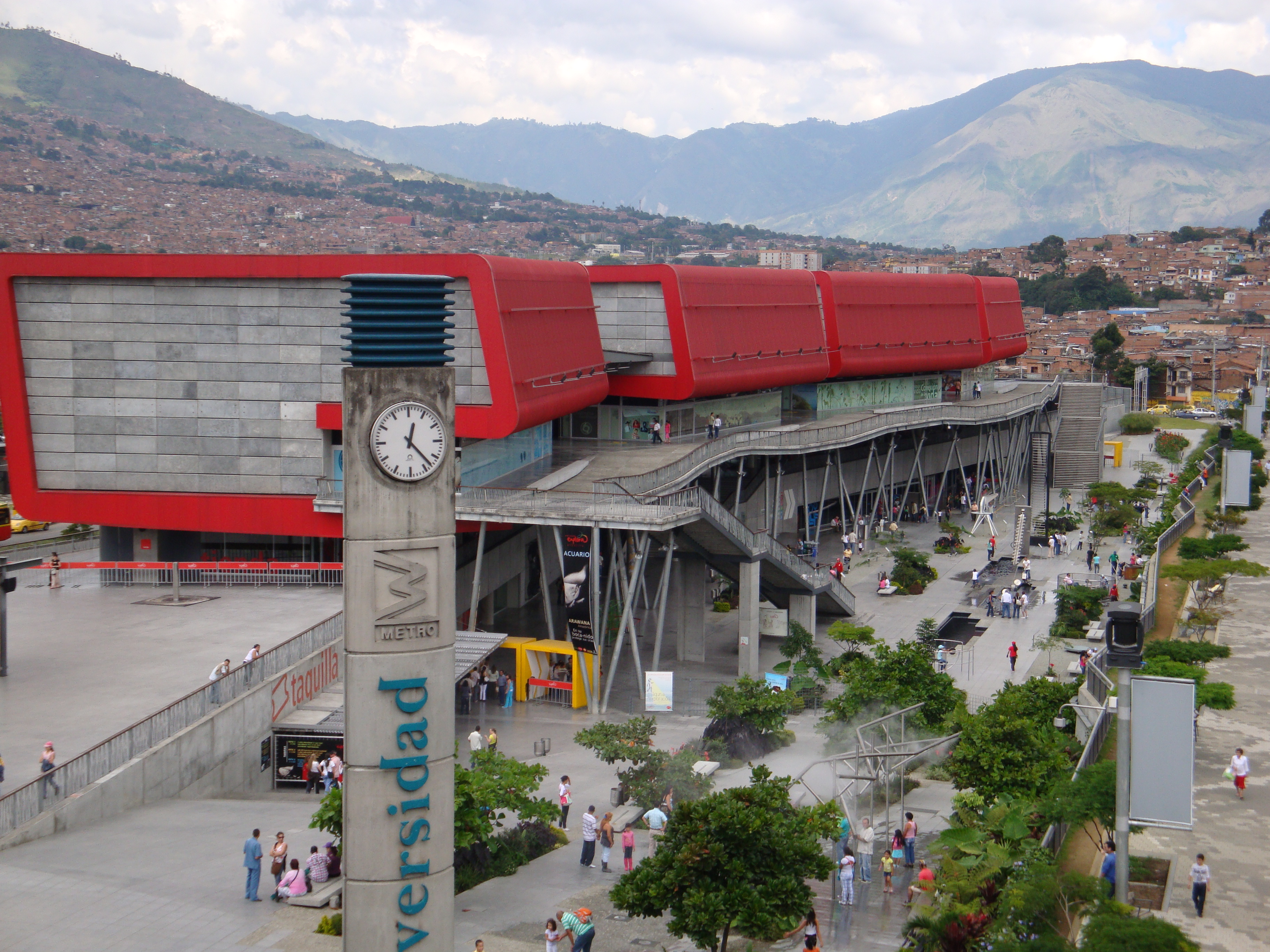
- Aerial shot of Parque Explora
- Established: 2008
- Location: Carrera 52 No 73-75; Medellín, Colombia
- Type: Science museum
- Website: www.parqueexplora.org

Parque Explora is an interactive science museum in Medellín, Colombia, loosely modeled after San Francisco's Exploratorium. It houses South America's largest freshwater aquarium, Explora Aquarium. The museum contains over 300 interactive attractions, as well as a 3D auditorium, planetarium, television studio, and vivarium. The museum opened in 2008.

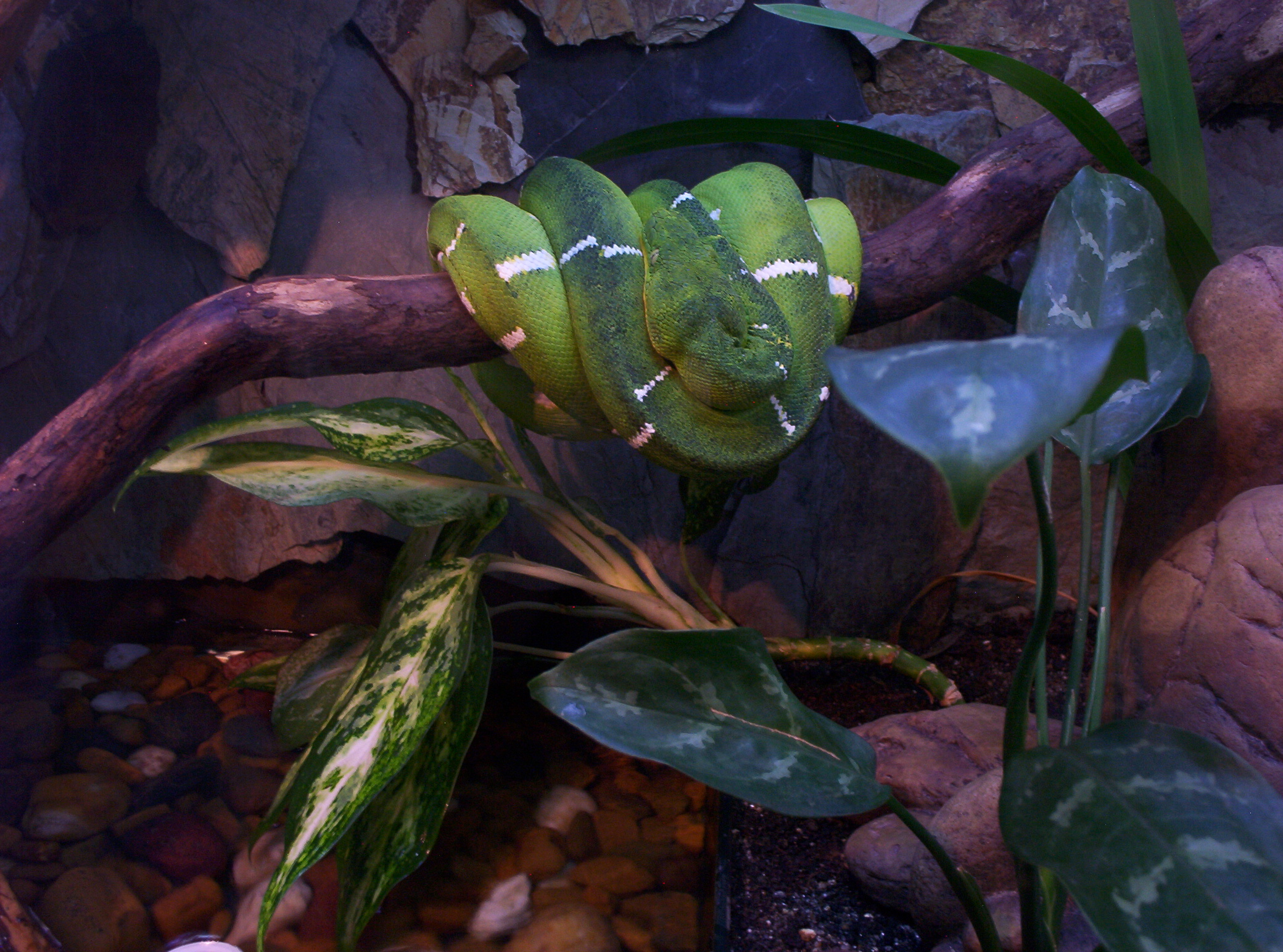
Snake from the vivarium

== Architecture ==
Architect Alejandro Echeverri designed the museum. It has a combination of indoor and outdoor space. Its four red "cubes" house the museum's science and technology rooms.

== Explora Aquarium ==
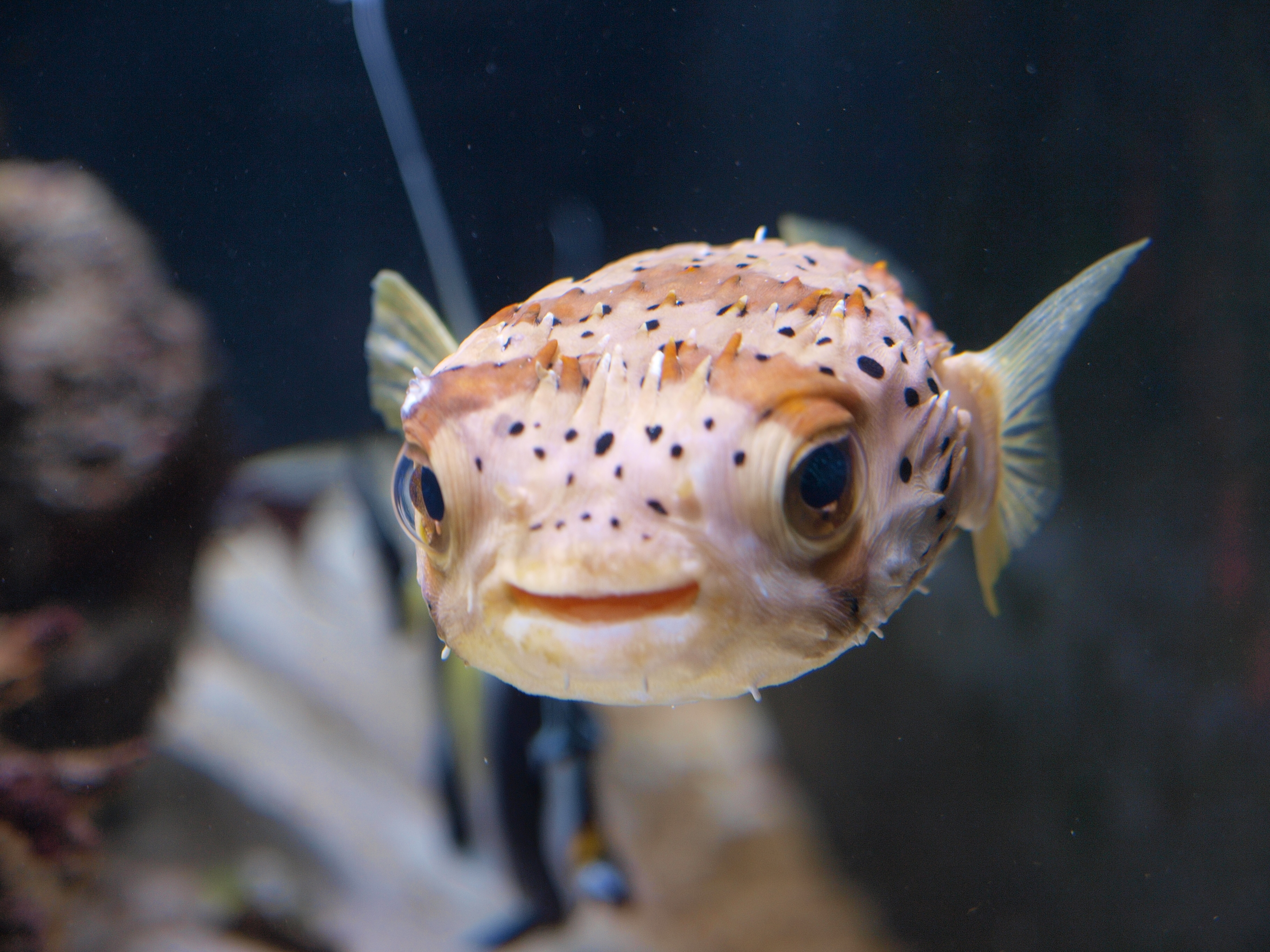
Pufferfish from the aquarium

Explora aquarium houses more than 2,000 organisms and about 250 of Colombia's most common species. Its 25 tanks exhibit many of the most representative species that inhabit Colombia's rivers and oceans, including piranhas, electric eels, and a panchromatic kaleidoscope of fish.

== Location ==
Parque Explora is located in the northern area of Medellín, known as the North Zone (Zona Norte), between Parque Norte and the Botanical Garden of Medellín. The museum can be reached by the Medellín Metro on line A, at the University Station stop, which is named for the nearby University of Antioquia.
