= Medellín Metropolitan Theatre =

Theater in Colombia

Coordinates: 6.2430°N 75.5774°W

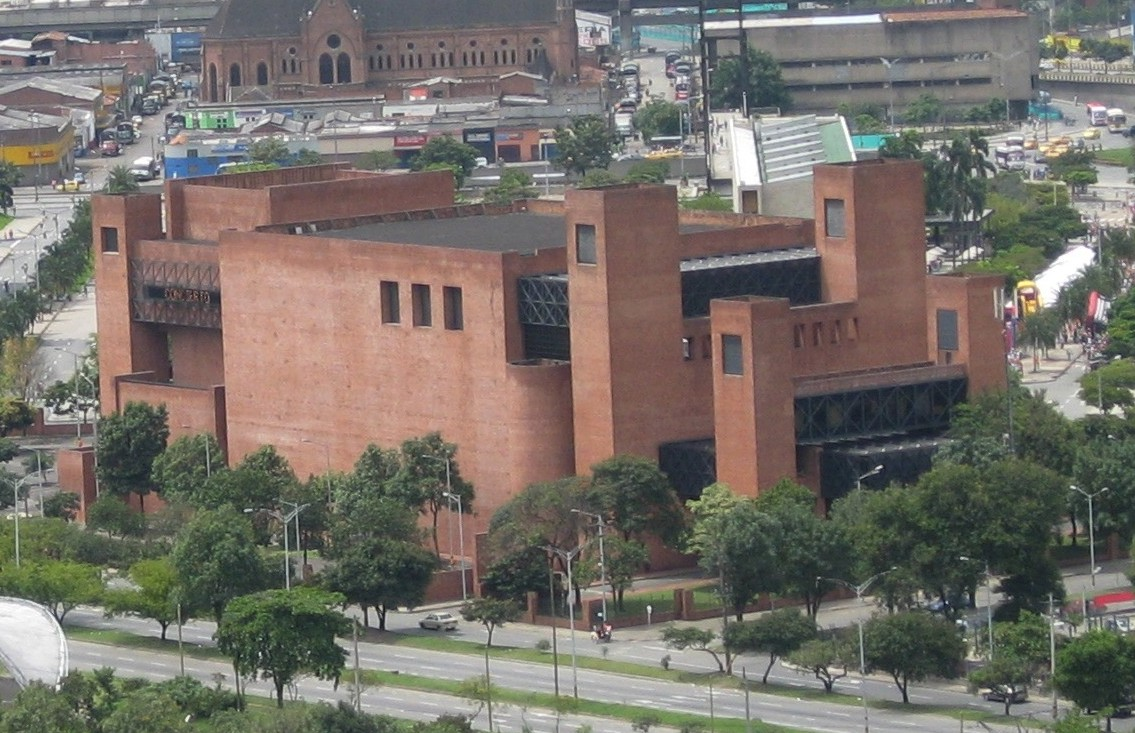
Medellín Metropolitan Theatre

The José Gutiérrez Gómez Medellín Metropolitan Theatre is the most important and biggest theater in the city of Medellín, Colombia.

== History ==
Several years after the Junín and Bolívar Theatres became unsuitable, the need for a location that offered better acoustics than the Pablo Tobón Uribe Theatre was clear. The Medellín Metropolitan Theatre, located in downtown Medellin, was opened in 1987. It is one of the main stages of the city, offering a varied programme throughout the year. It has a capacity of 1,634 and has space for schools and rehearsals. The theatre is the headquarters of the Medellín Polyphonic Research Institute and the Medellín Philharmonic Orchestra.
