= Medellín River =

River in Colombia

Coordinates: 6°05′24″N 75°38′17″W

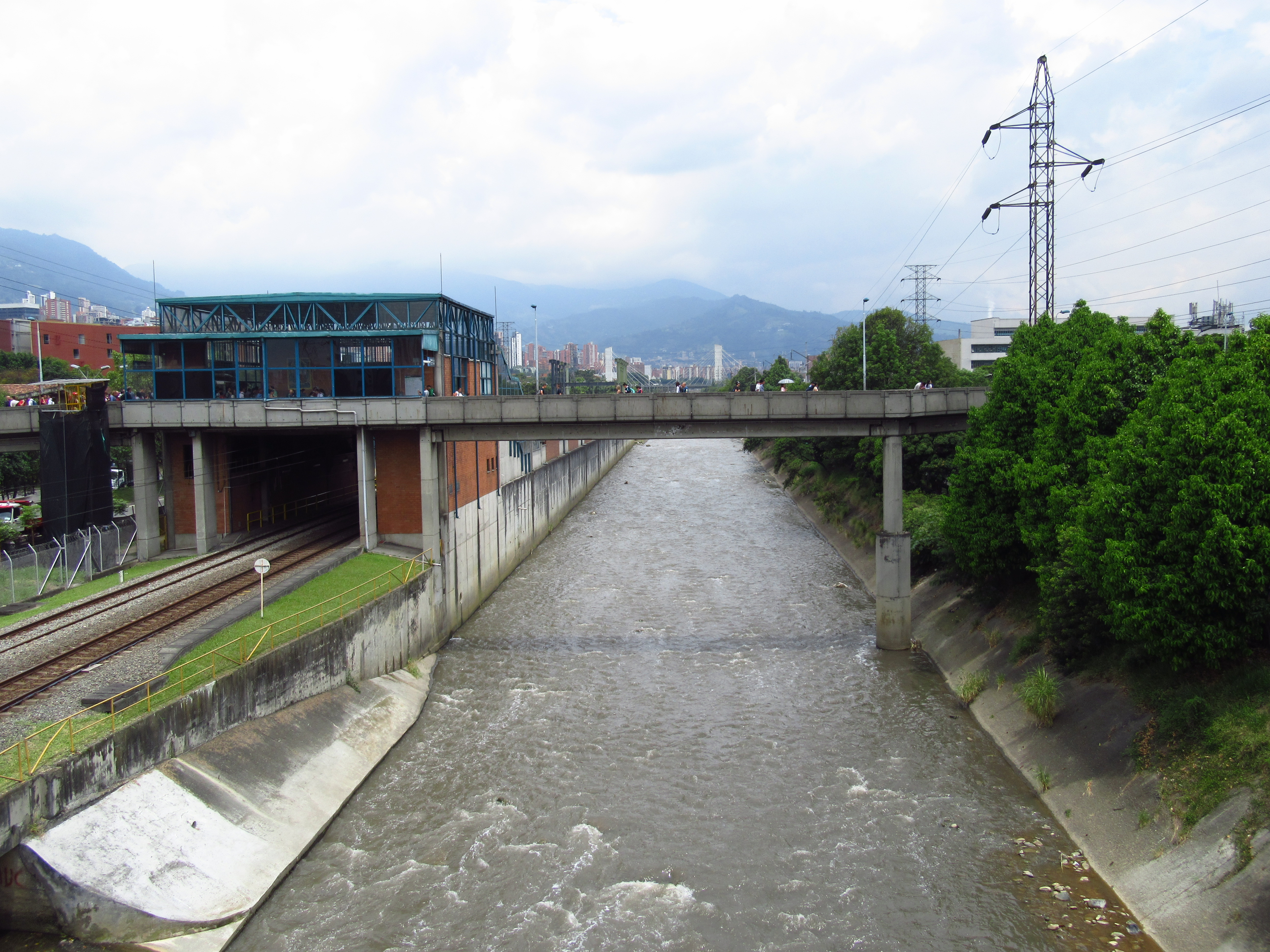
Medellín River

The Medellín River (Spanish: Río Medellín), called Porce River (Spanish: Río Porce) during most of its course, is a river that flows through the Colombian city of Medellín and its metropolitan area. For many years an organization called Mi Río (My River) was involved in river cleanup projects.

For the river's first 60 kilometres (37 mi), it is referred to as the Medellín, and after that it is known as the Porce. It is a tributary of the Nechi River, which flows in turn into the Cauca River.

Every year, the Christmas lighting of Medellín takes place on the Medellín River.

== Porce III Dam ==
The river is the site of the Porce III Dam, which was completed in 2011.

== History ==
From 1883 to 1916, the canalization of the river aroused the interest of the upper class, who saw in this work the possibility of improving the hygienic and sanitary conditions of the city, but also concentrated the desire to drain the territory, improve its conditions and incorporate them into the city to expand the urban area between the old village and the banks of the river.
