= Suramericana station =

Medellín metro station

South American Estación Suramericana
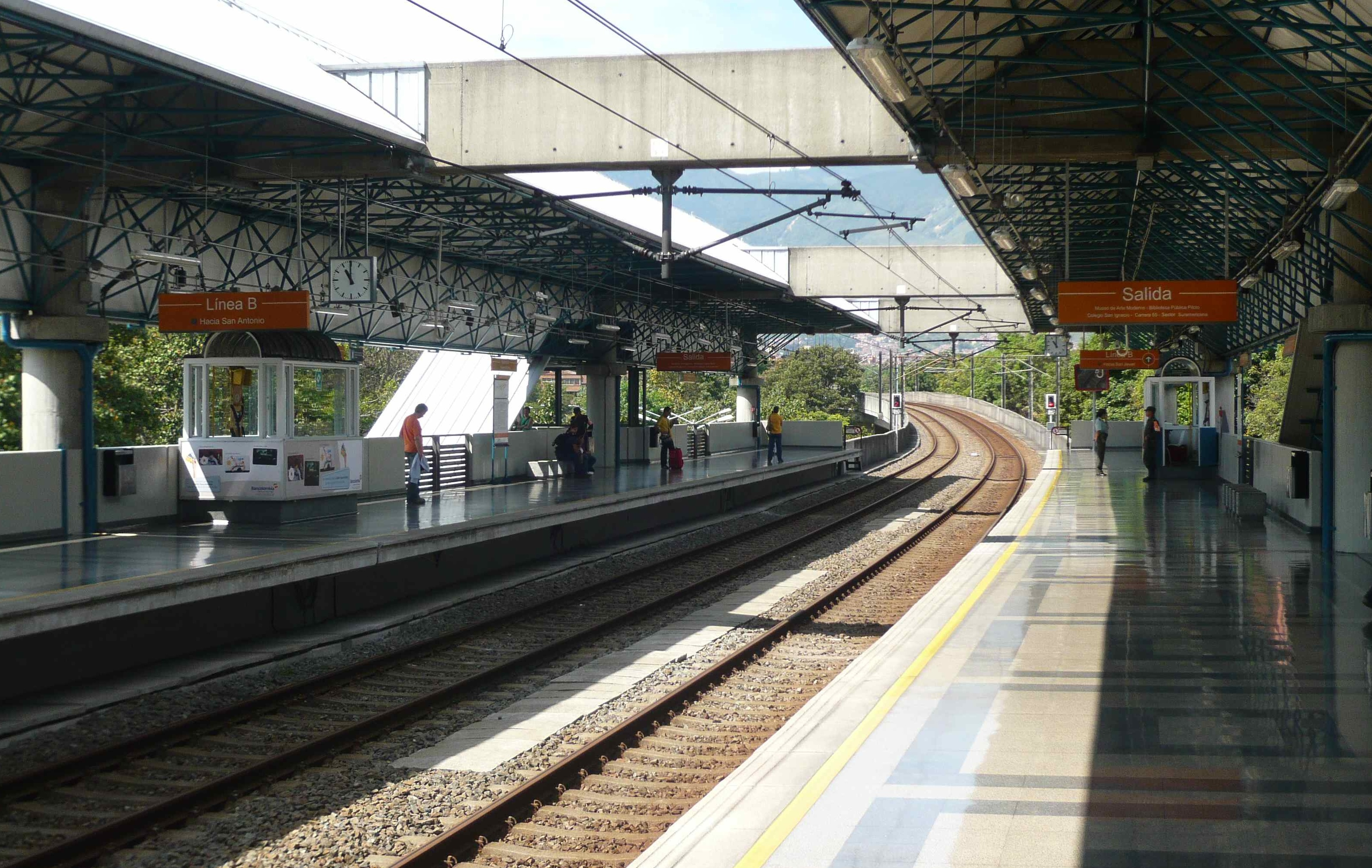

General information
- Location: Carrera 65 # 47D - 15, Medellín; Colombia
- Coordinates: 6°15′11″N 75°34′59″W

History
- Opened: 28 February 1996; 30 years ago

Services
| Preceding station | Medellín Metro | Following station |
|---|---|---|
| Estadio towards San Javier | Line B | Cisneros towards San Antonio |
Location

Suramericana is the third stop on line B of the Medellín Metro going from the center of the city to the west. It is one of five stations located by the La Hueso ravine. The station is elevated and is also located near the Medellín Museum of Modern Art, the National University of Colombia, and El Volador hill. Outside the station there is the statue Monument to Life by Rodrigo Arenas Betancourt and the tiled mural Our Lady of the Macarena by Gabriel Ripol. The station was opened on 28 February 1996 as part of the inaugural section of line B, from San Javier to San Antonio.

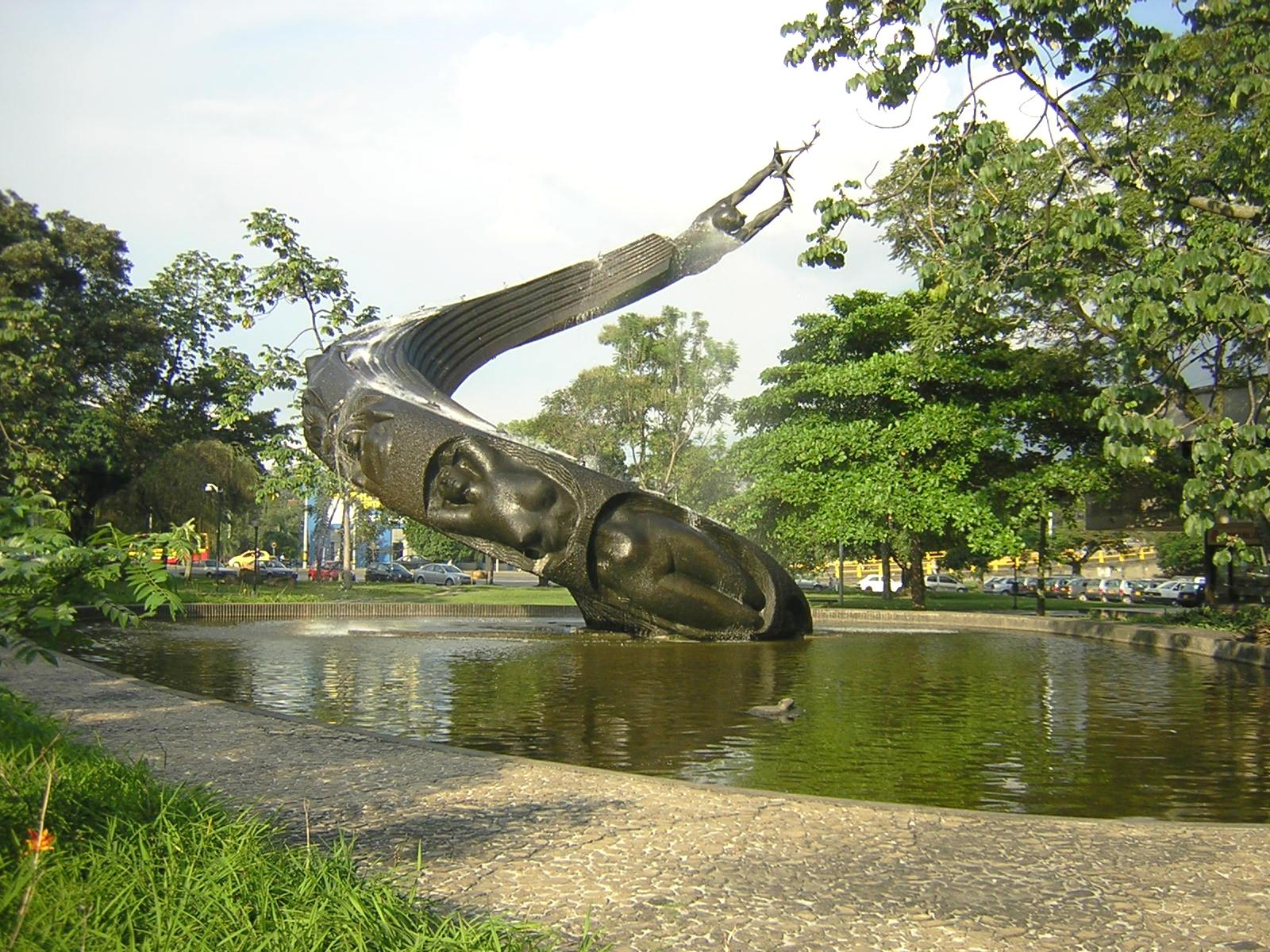
Monument to Life sculpture
