= Cisneros station =

Medellín metro station

Cisneros Estación Cisneros
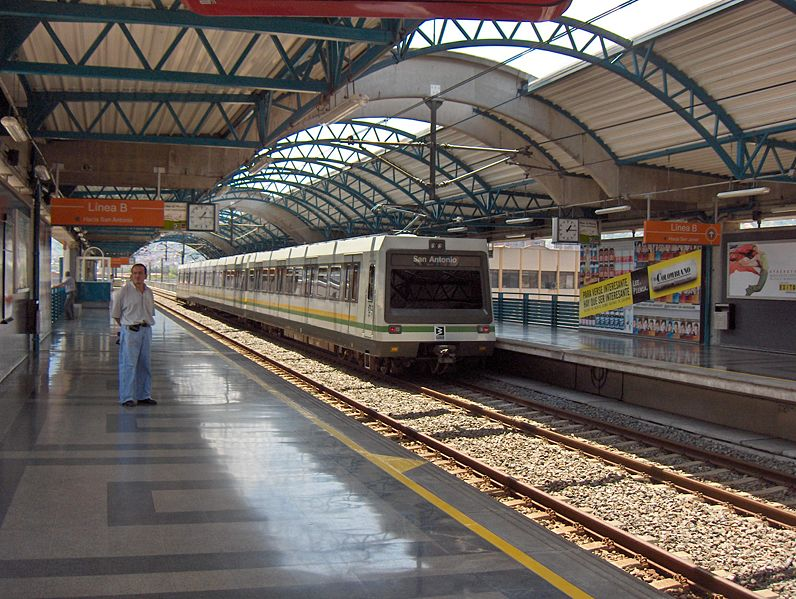

General information
- Location: La Candelaria, Medellín; Colombia
- Coordinates: 6°14′57″N 75°34′31″W

History
- Opened: 28 February 1996; 30 years ago

Services
Preceding station	Medellín Metro	Following station
Suramericana towards San Javier	Line B	San Antonio Terminus
Location

Cisneros is the second station on line B of the Medellín Metro, going from the central city to the west. It is named after the nearby Plaza Cisneros and its Cuban engineer, Francisco Javier Cisneros. It is an elevated station in the district La Candelaria, in the city center just before the Medellín river and close to La Alpujarra Administrative Center (next to the Alpujarra station), the headquarters of Teleantioquia, the Geographic Institute Agustín Codazzi, and Autonomous University, and El Volador hill. The station was opened on 28 February 1996 as part of the inaugural section of line B, from San Javier to San Antonio.

This line will be integrated with the metro bus system known as Metroplus to facilitate movement in the city of Medellín.
