= Juan XXIII station =

Medellín metrocable station

Juan XXIII Estación Juan XXIII
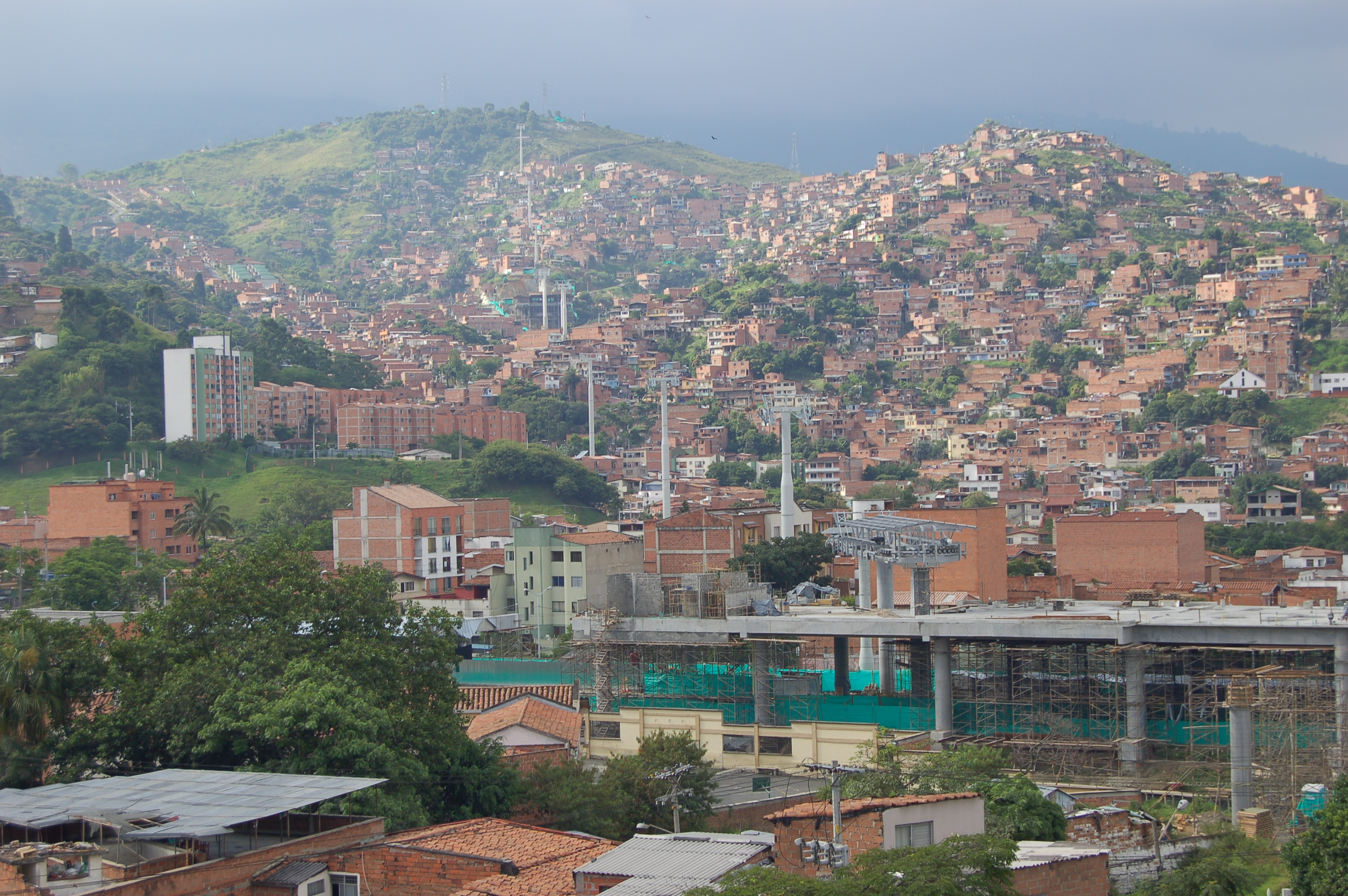
- View of Juan XXIII station

General information
- Location: Medellín; Colombia
- Coordinates: 6°15′56.5″N 75°36′49.3″W

Services
Preceding station	Medellín Metro	Following station
Vallejuelos towards La Aurora	Line J	San Javier Terminus
Location

Juan XXIII is a metrocable station on line J of the Medellín Metro. The station is located in the Juan XXIII neighborhood of the San Javier commune. This station covers communes 13 (San Javier) and 7 (Robledo).
