= Vallejuelos station =

Medellín metrocable station

Vallejuelos Estación Vallejuelos
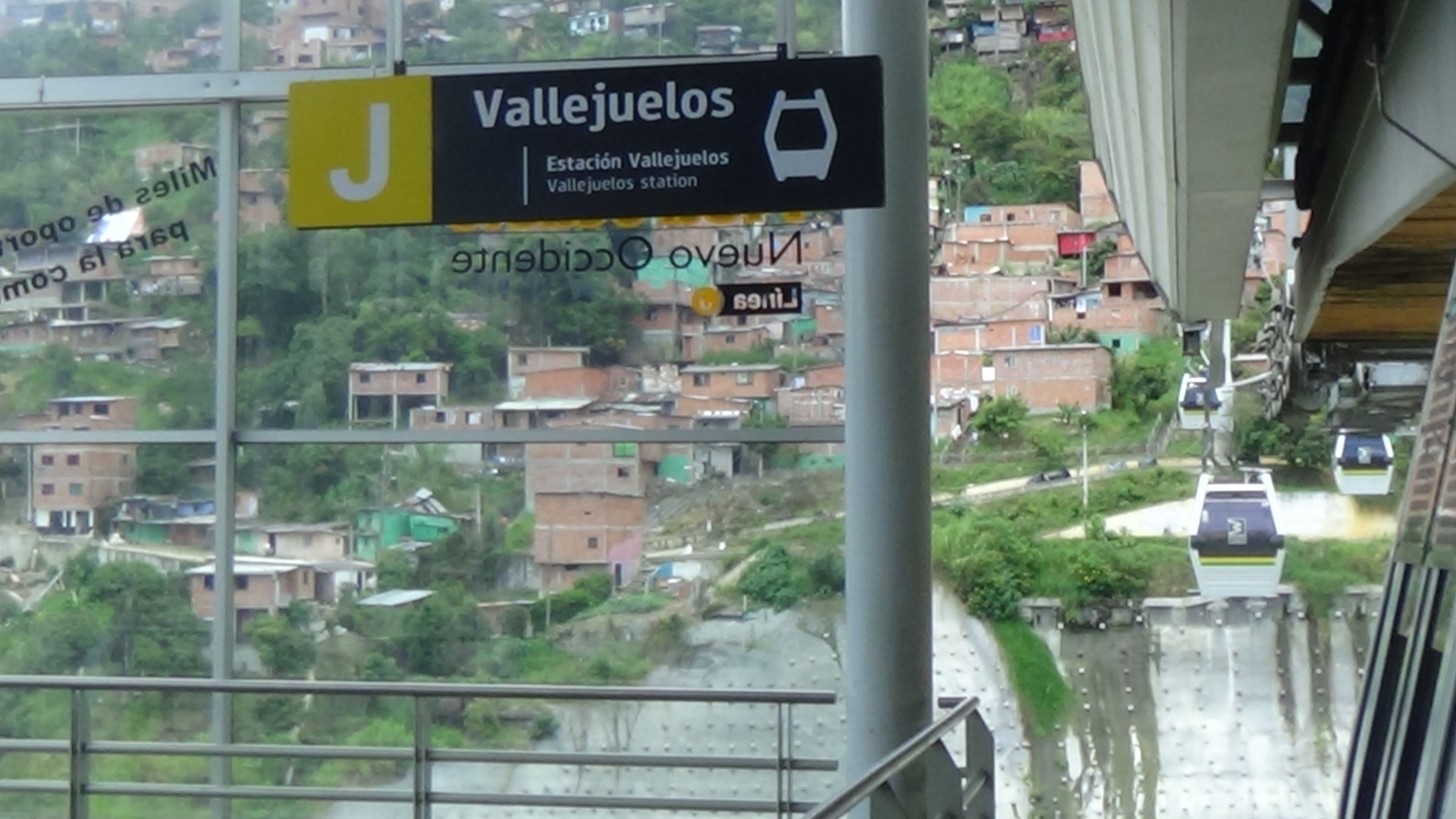
- View from the station.

General information
- Location: Medellín; Colombia
- Coordinates: 6°16′31.3″N 75°36′50.5″W

Services
Preceding station	Medellín Metro	Following station
La Aurora Terminus	Line J	Juan XXIII towards San Javier
Location

Vallejuelos is a metrocable station on line J of the Medellín Metro. This station covers communes 13 (San Javier) and 7 (Robledo).
