= Nutibara sculpture park =

Sculpture garden in Medellín, Colombia

Coordinates: 6.2365°N 75.5808°W

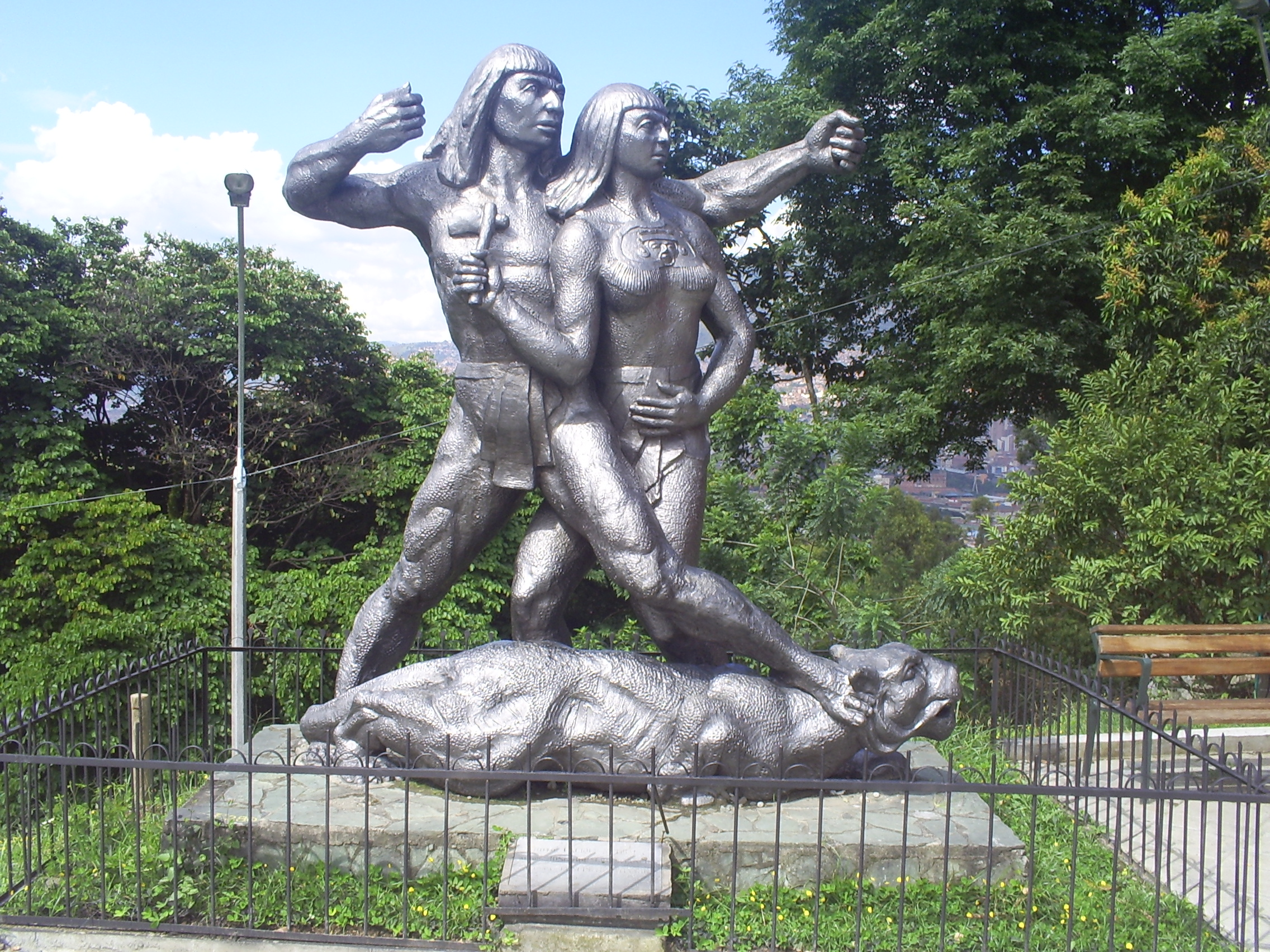
Cacique Nutibara, by José Horacio Betancur

Sculpture Park (Spanish: Parque de las Esculturas) is a sculpture garden at the foot of Nutibara Hill in Medellín, Colombia and the first of its kind in the country. The park contains 10 modern and abstract sculptures by famous Colombian and international artists such as Edgar Negret (Colombia), Otto Herbert Hajek (Germany), and Sergio de Camargo (Brazil).

Its closest metro station is Industriales. The park is free to the public and is open from 6 am to midnight.

== History ==
Sculpture Park was created in 1983 on the initiative of former Colombian President Belisario Betancur Cuartas, who wanted to turn the area into an important cultural center. In a record time of 15 days in December 1983, invited artists gave life to one of the most ambitious cultural projects in the city. The Museum of Modern Art of Medellin coordinated the installation of a permanent display of sculptures made by 10 national and international artists to be installed in the natural environment of the hill.

The park includes works by Sergio Camargo (Brasil), Carlos Cruz Díez (Venezuela), Manuel Falguerez (Mexico), Otto Herbert Hajek (Germany), Julio Le Parc (Argentina), Édgar Negret (Colombia), John Castles (Colombia), Ronny Vayda (Colombia) and Alberto Uribe (Colombia).

=== Cacique Nutibara Sculpture ===
The first monumental sculpture that was made especially to decorate Nutibara was the Madremonte, by José Horacio Betancur in 1953. Since its delivery, Madremonte was exposed early in the House of Culture, and then the Nutibara hill, until March 27, 1986, when it was moved to the Botanical Garden of Medellín in exchange for sculpture Cacique Nutibara, also by Betancur.

This sculpture, made in the year 1955, is patinated concrete, weighs four tons and is 3 m high by 2.9 m wide.

Before being located on the western side of the top of the hill, the Cacique Nutibara was exhibited at the Plaza that bears his name, then in the garden art of Laureles. In 1963 it was transferred first to Cerro Nutibara, where it remained until 1970, when it was taken to the Botanical Garden, where he remained until March 27, 1986, and then returned definitively to Nutibara hill.

== Gallery ==
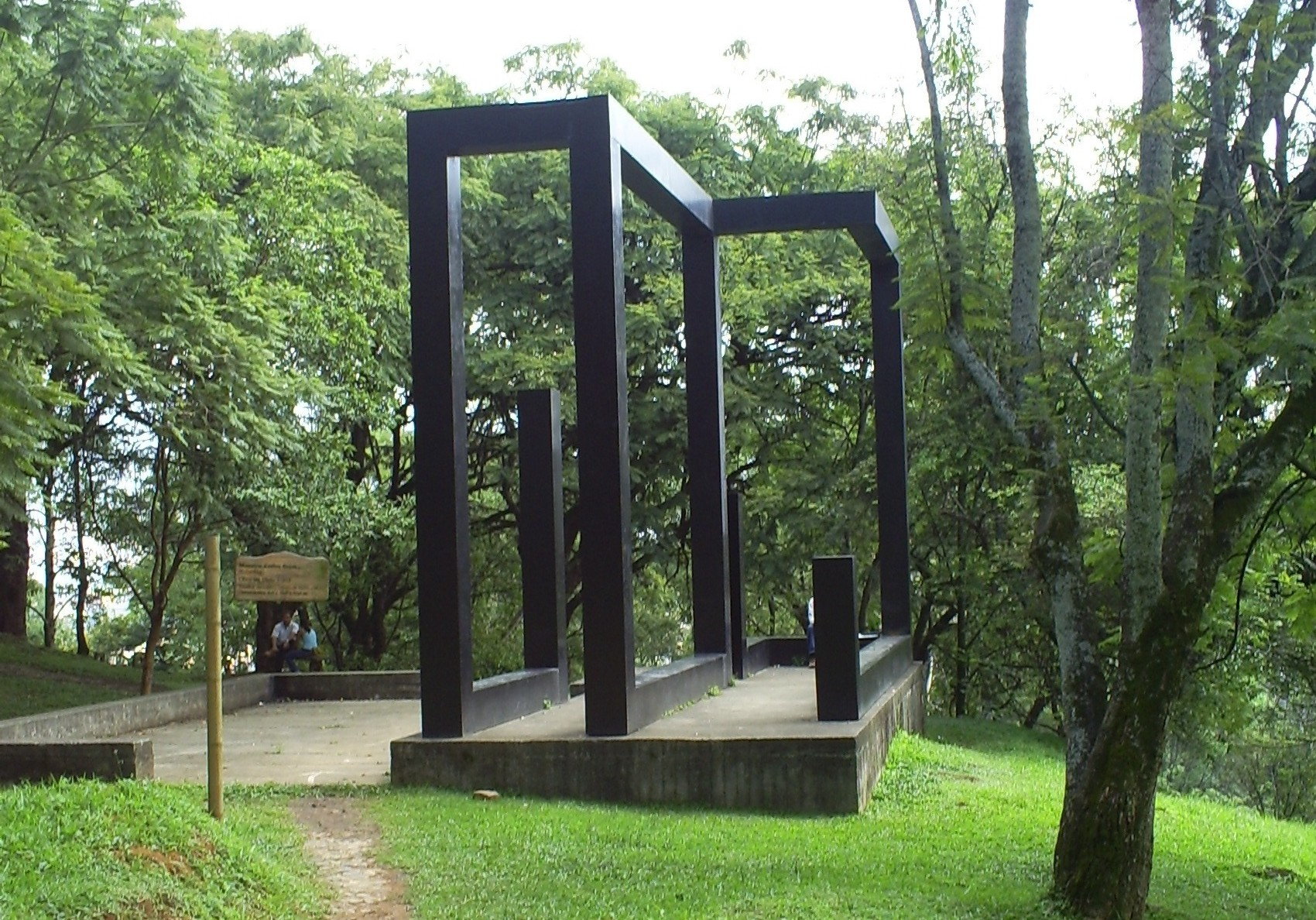
Untitled, Carlos Rojas

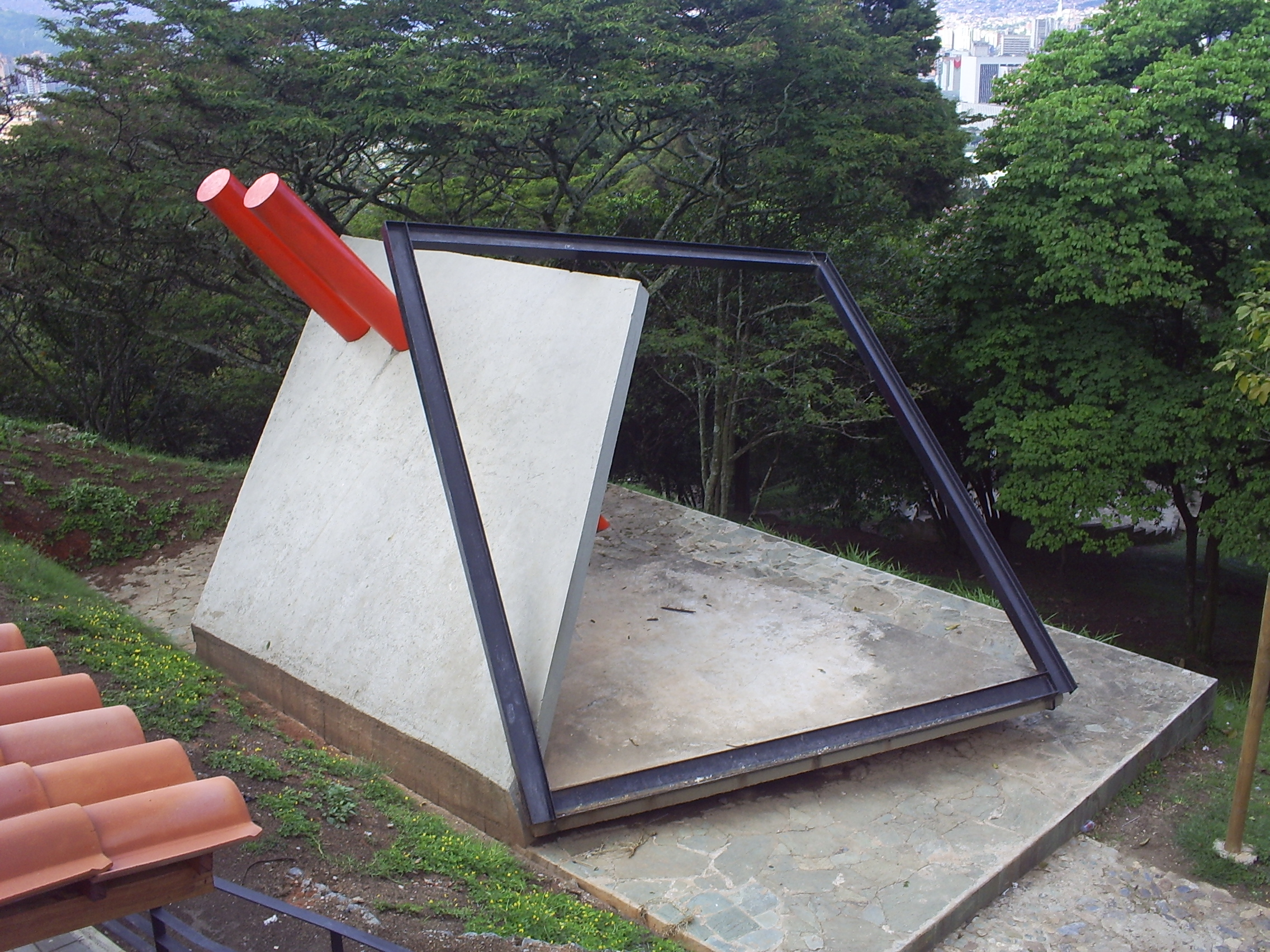
Construction, Manuel Felguérez

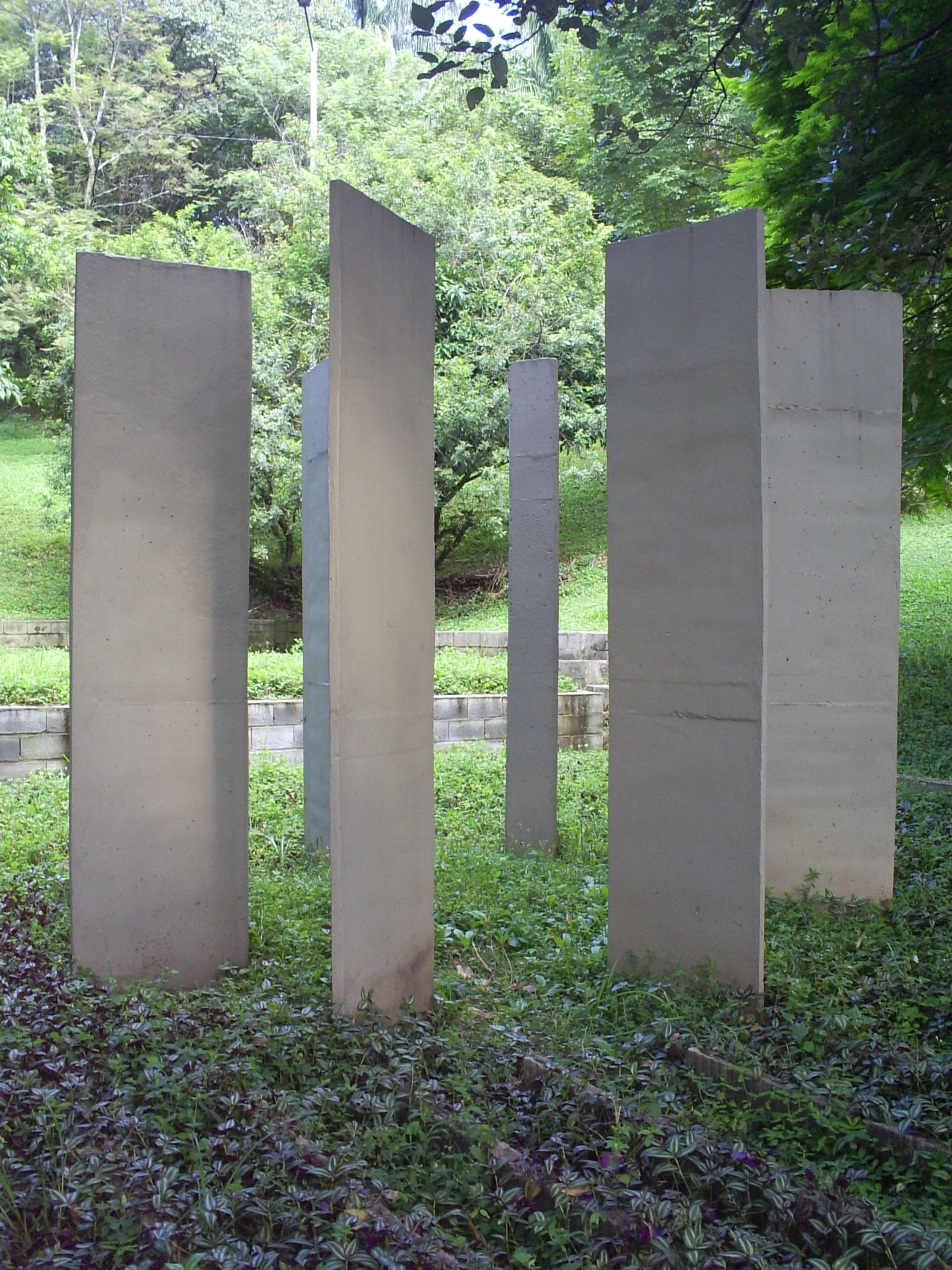
Sculpture as Vegetable, Carlos Cruz-Diez

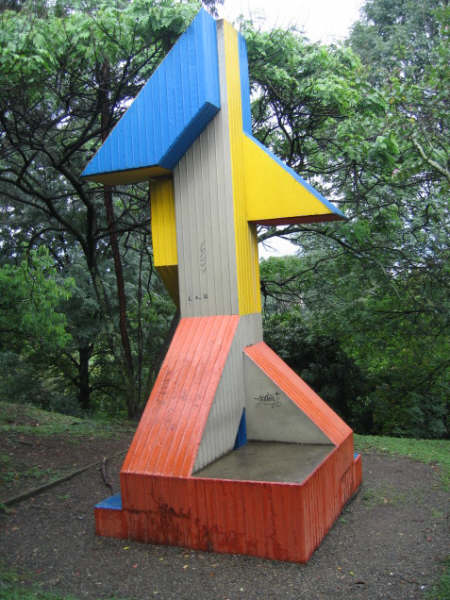
Signs fluttering into space, Otto Hayek

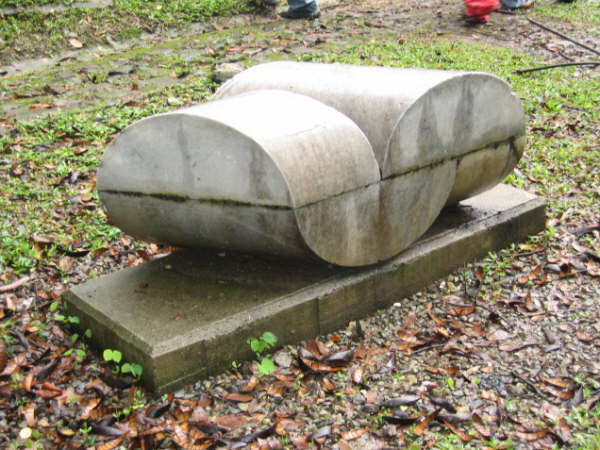
Untitled, Sergio de Camargo

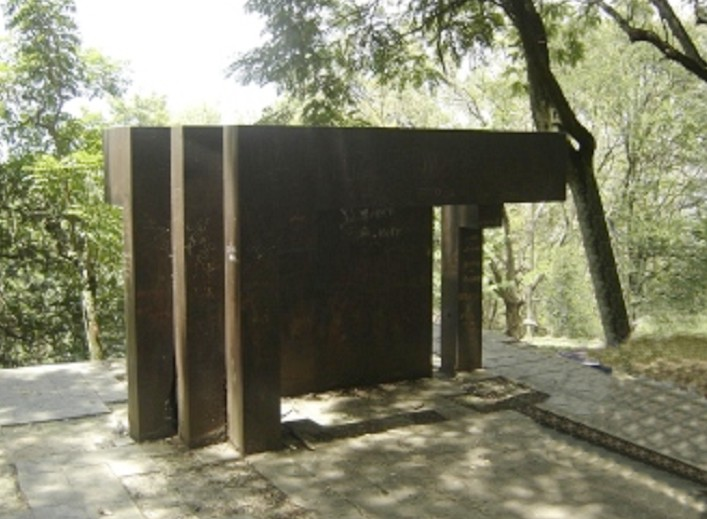
Untitled, Ronny Vayda
