= Plaza Cisneros =

Park in Medellín, Colombia

Coordinates: 6.2458°N 75.5722°W

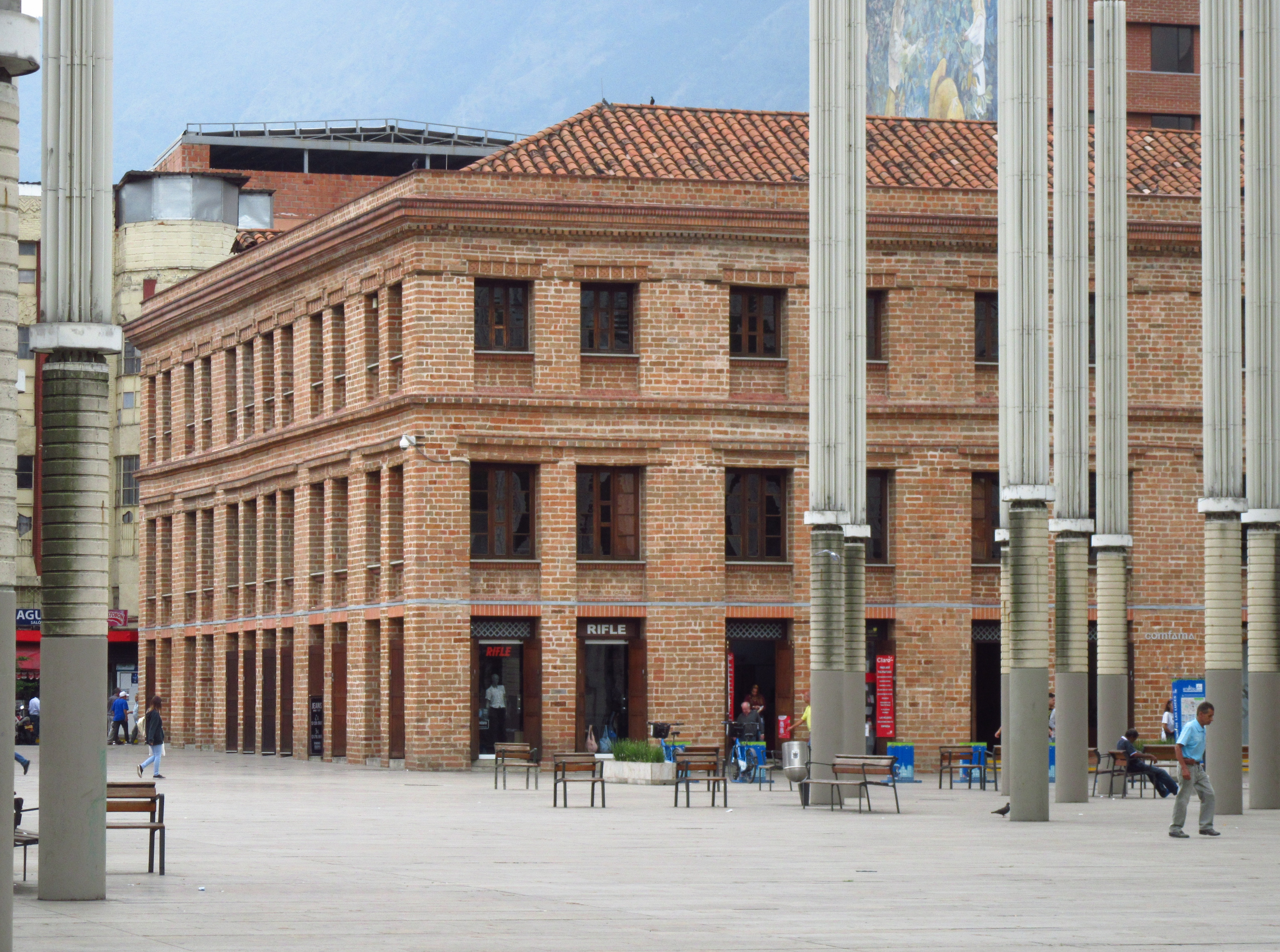
- Plaza Cisneros with Edificio Vásquez in the background.
- Interactive map of Plaza Cisneros
- Location: La Candelaria, Medellín, Colombia
- Created: 1924
- Status: Open year-round

Plaza Cisneros (Spanish: Plaza de Cisneros), also known as Luces Park or Lights Park (Spanish: Parque de las Luces), is a plaza in Medellín, Colombia. It is named after the Cuban engineer Francisco Javier Cisneros, who led the construction of the Antioquia Railway. It has an artificial forest of 300 light poles, which are up to 24 meters high. The plaza used to be the main marketplace of the city.

The plaza was renovated with its current light fixtures as part of a renewal effort to rejuvenate the area. This project was called "Medellí is light".

The plaza is located among the EPM Library and the Carre and Vásquez Buildings, and the Antioquia Railway Station.

== Gallery ==
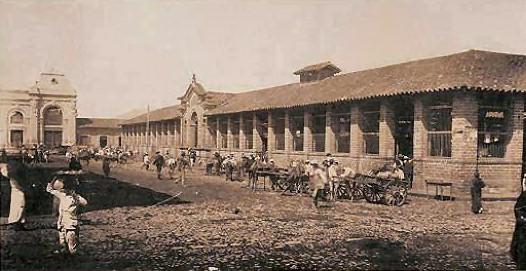
Old marketplace at Plaza Cisneros

== See also ==
- Cisneros station
