= Carlos Vieco Ortiz =

Colombian musician

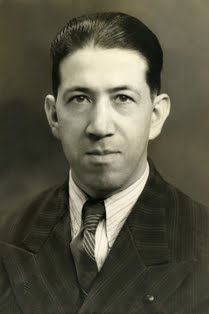
Carlos Vieco Ortiz

Carlos Vieco Ortiz (March 4, 1904 - September 13, 1979) was a musician and composer from Medellín, Colombia. The open air theater on Nutibara Hill in Medellín is named after him.

== Life and career ==
From a young age grew up in a very directed towards art. A time where music Antioquia was a way to tell what is living in the villages, which were noted for being workers and thriving.

His compositions are close to three thousand, among them the most recognized are: arable land, to Calvary, bye little white house slave romance then sad and distant water night God, prayer to the sun, the last letter, cultuvando roses, soul idígena, offering, winter and spring.
