= Nutibara Hill =

Hill in Colombia

Coordinates: 6.2367°N 75.5803°W

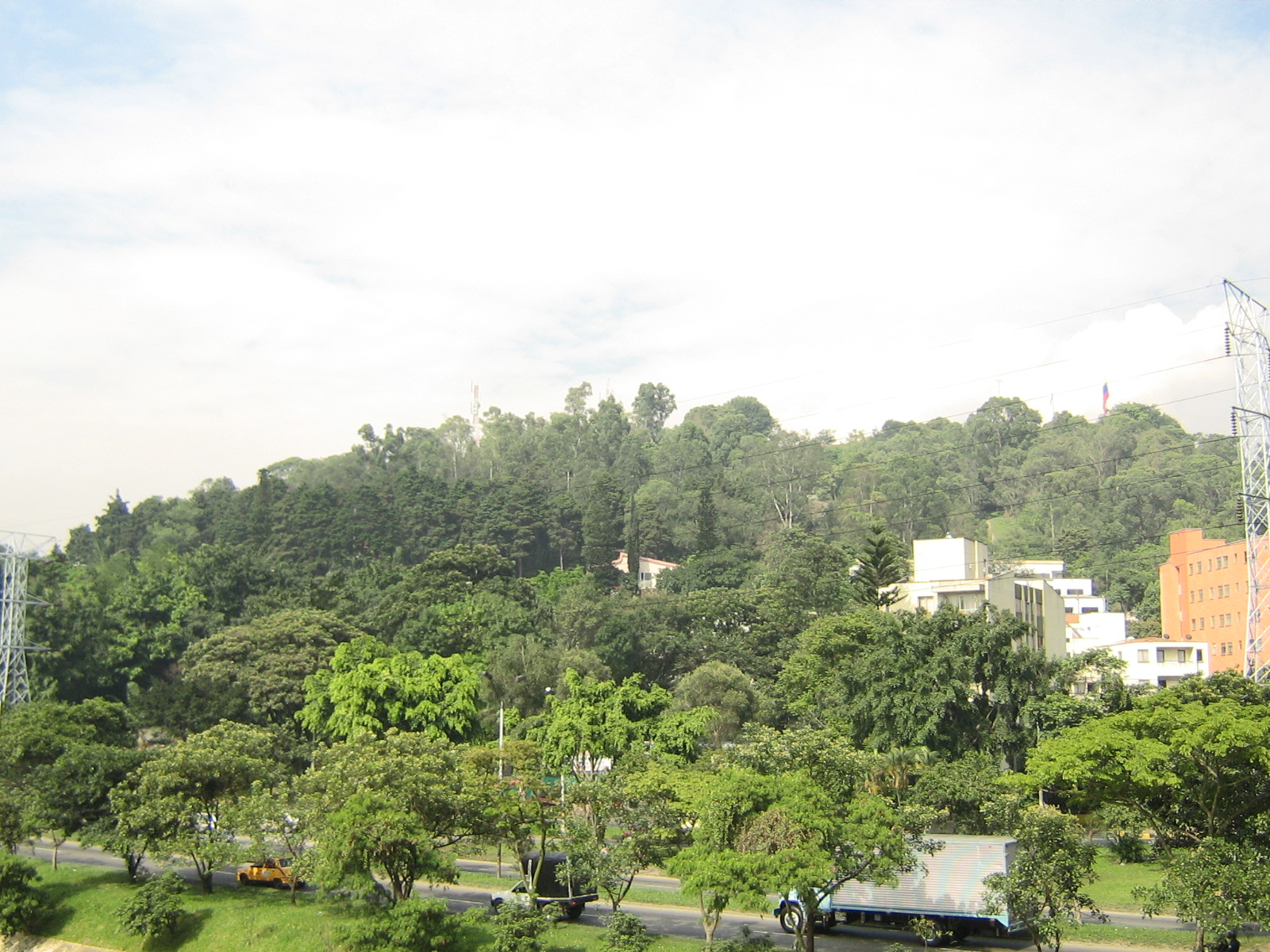
- Interactive map of Nutibara Hill
- Type: Public
- Location: 30A Street Nº 55-64; Medellín, Colombia
- Created: 1930

Nutibara Hill (Spanish: Cerro Nutibara) is a rocky hill formation located in the Colombian city of Medellín, in the geographic center of the Aburrá Valley and on the west bank of the Medellín River. It is one of the few ecosystems that is conserved in Medellín and is considered one of the city's seven "guardian" hills. The hill has a sculpture park, the open-air Carlos Vieco Auditorium, and the Pueblito Paisa a reproduction of the traditional Colombian township, amongst other sights. The hill is 80 meters tall and has an area of 333,300 m^{2}. It is named after the indigenous Chief Nutibara.

Initially with the arrival of the Spanish conquistadors, the hill was called "Marcela of the Parra Hill", and then "Cadavides Hill". Finally, it was renamed Nutibara, which remains its name today.

== History ==
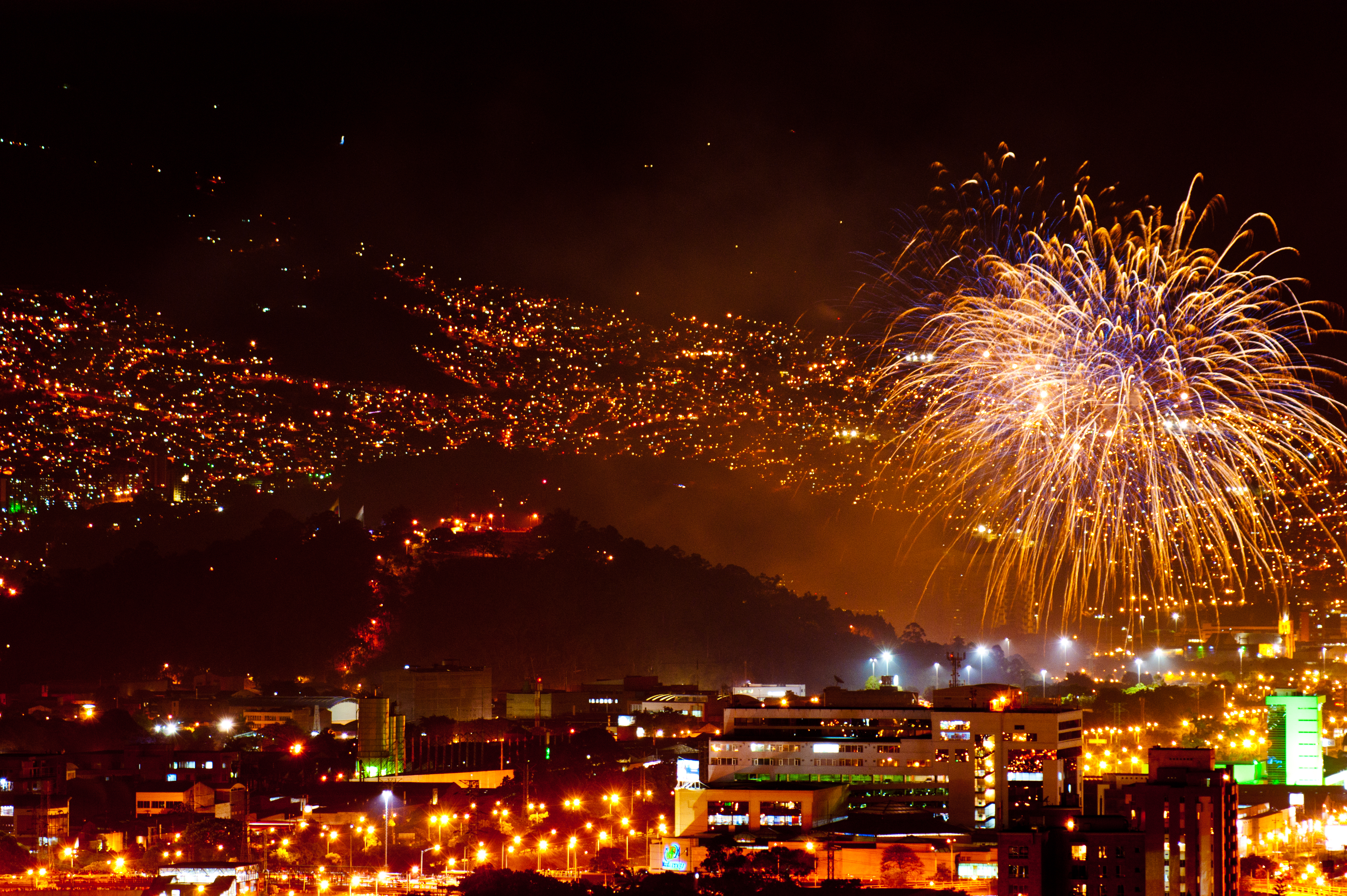
Fireworks in Medellín, as part of Colombian Bicentennial. Nutibara Hill can be seen on the left.

During the eighteenth and nineteenth centuries, when Medellín was known as the Villa de Nuestra Señora de la Candelaria on the banks of the Santa Elena, Nutibara hill was not a part of the landscape of this small town. At that time it was identified as the "Marcela Hill of the Vine", the name of the owner of these once-remote lands on the other side of the Medellín River. With this name it was identified until a family named Cadavid, became its new owner, acquiring the name "Hills of the Cadavides". It was known as such for two years after the Municipality of Medellín bought it in 1927 for the cost of $50,000 pesos. It was bought in order to create a recreational park, preserving its ecological characteristics, for a city that continued to grow.

In 1929 the Society of Public Improvements (Spanish: Sociedad de Mejoras Públicas, SMP), proposed to the City Council to rename the hill, making it less private and more public but at the time identified with the region. While the first initiative to find the new name was to open a contest, finally the members of the Board of the SMP chose the new name. With the choice of the name "Nutibara", SMP wanted to pay homage to one of the richest and most powerful of the caciques of the department of Antioquia, whose dominions extended over most of the West.

After the name change in 1930, the Municipality authorized the Society of Public Improvements to work on the preparation of drawings and plans for the construction of a recreational park on the hill. A plan was approved in 1939, which included the design and construction of internal and external roads for easy access, gazebos, kiosks, planting trees, parking, lakes, waterfalls, rustic bridges, footpaths, approved viewpoints and a restaurant at the top.

== Attractions ==
=== Pueblito Paisa ===
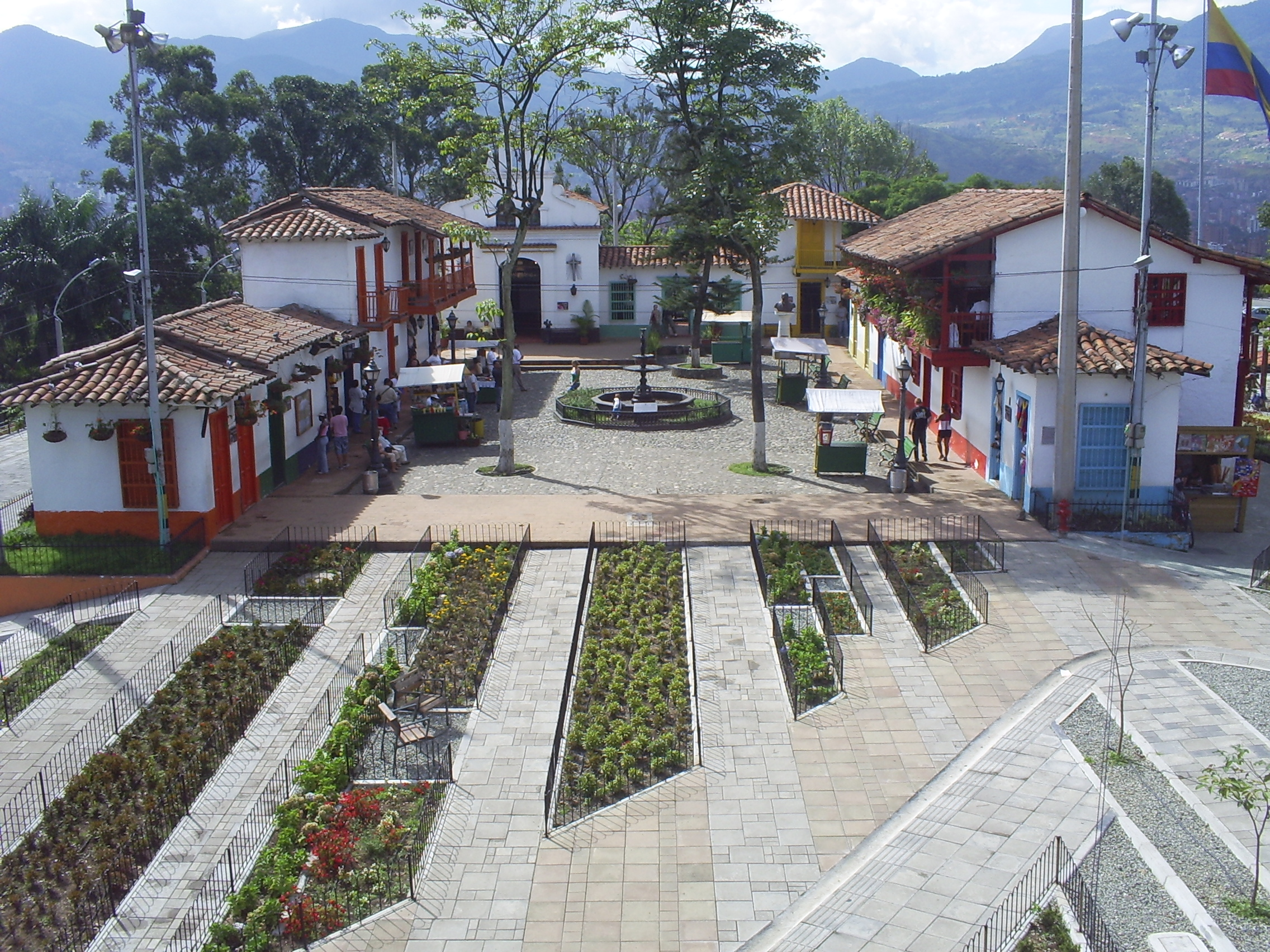
Pueblito Paisa

At its summit is the Pueblito Paisa, a reproduction of the municipalities of the Paisa region built in 1977.

=== Sculpture Park ===
The sculpture park created in 1983 at the initiative of former Colombian President Belisario Betancur Cuartas. The Medellín Museum of Modern Art coordinated the installation of a permanent exhibition of sculptures made by 10 national and international artists installed in the natural environment of the hill.

The first monumental sculpture that was made especially to decorate Nutibara was the Madremonte, by José Horacio Betancur in 1953. Since its delivery, Madremonte was exposed early in the House of Culture, and then the Nutibara hill, until March 27, 1986, when it was moved to the Botanical Garden of Medellín in exchange for sculpture Cacique Nutibara, also by Betancur.

=== Carlos Vieco Theater ===
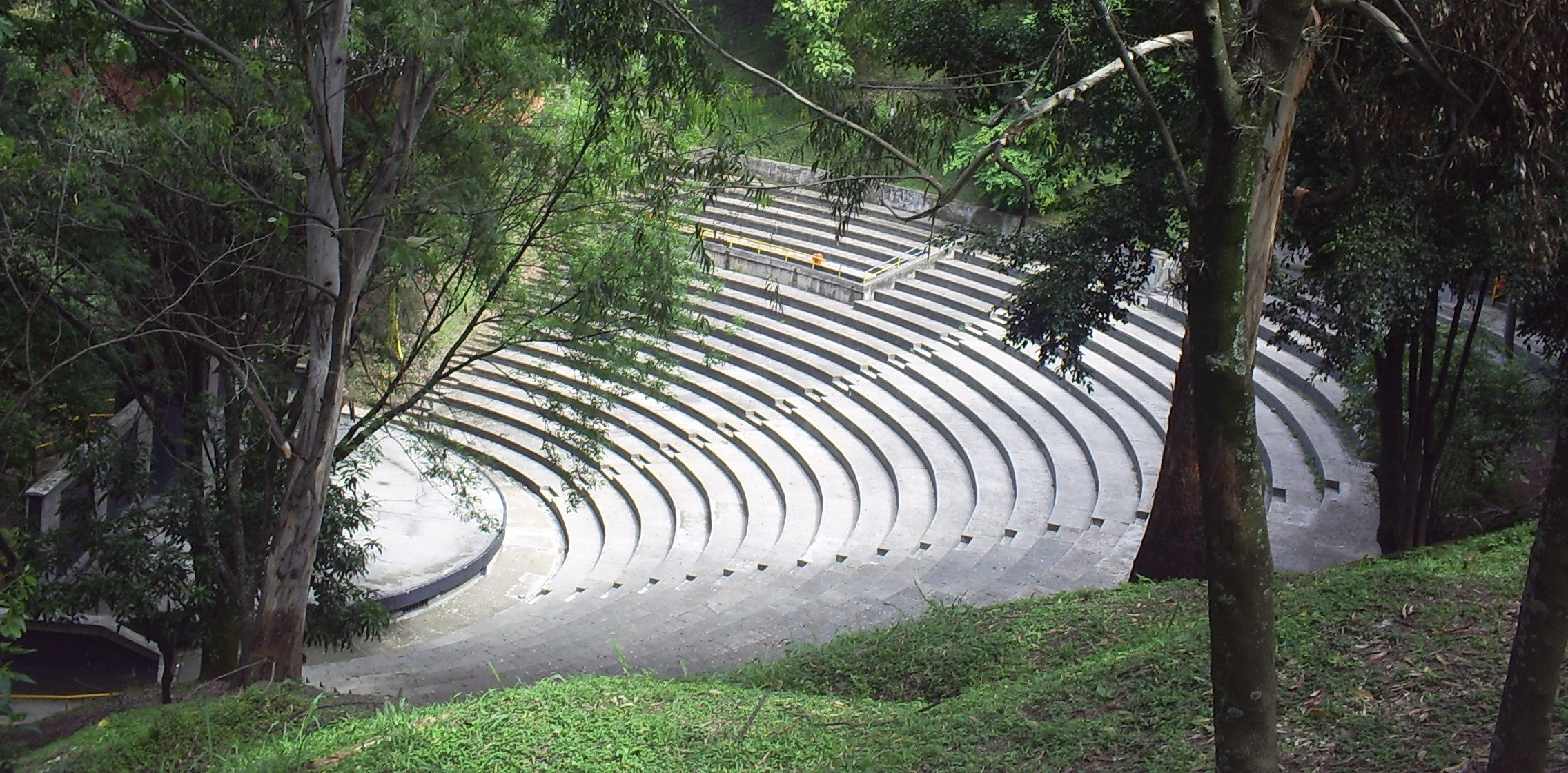
Carlos Vieco Theater

The open-air Carlos Vieco Theater is located on the northern slope of Nutibara Hill. It opened in 1984 and was designed by architect Oscar Mesa. The theater has a capacity of 3,800 spectators. It is named in honor of the Colombian composer Carlos Vieco Ortiz, who was born in Medellín.

It offers all kinds of popular shows. Every year in June, the theater becomes the epicenter of the concerts of the International Poetry Festival. There are also frequent rock concerts, like the Altavoz Festival.

== Gallery ==
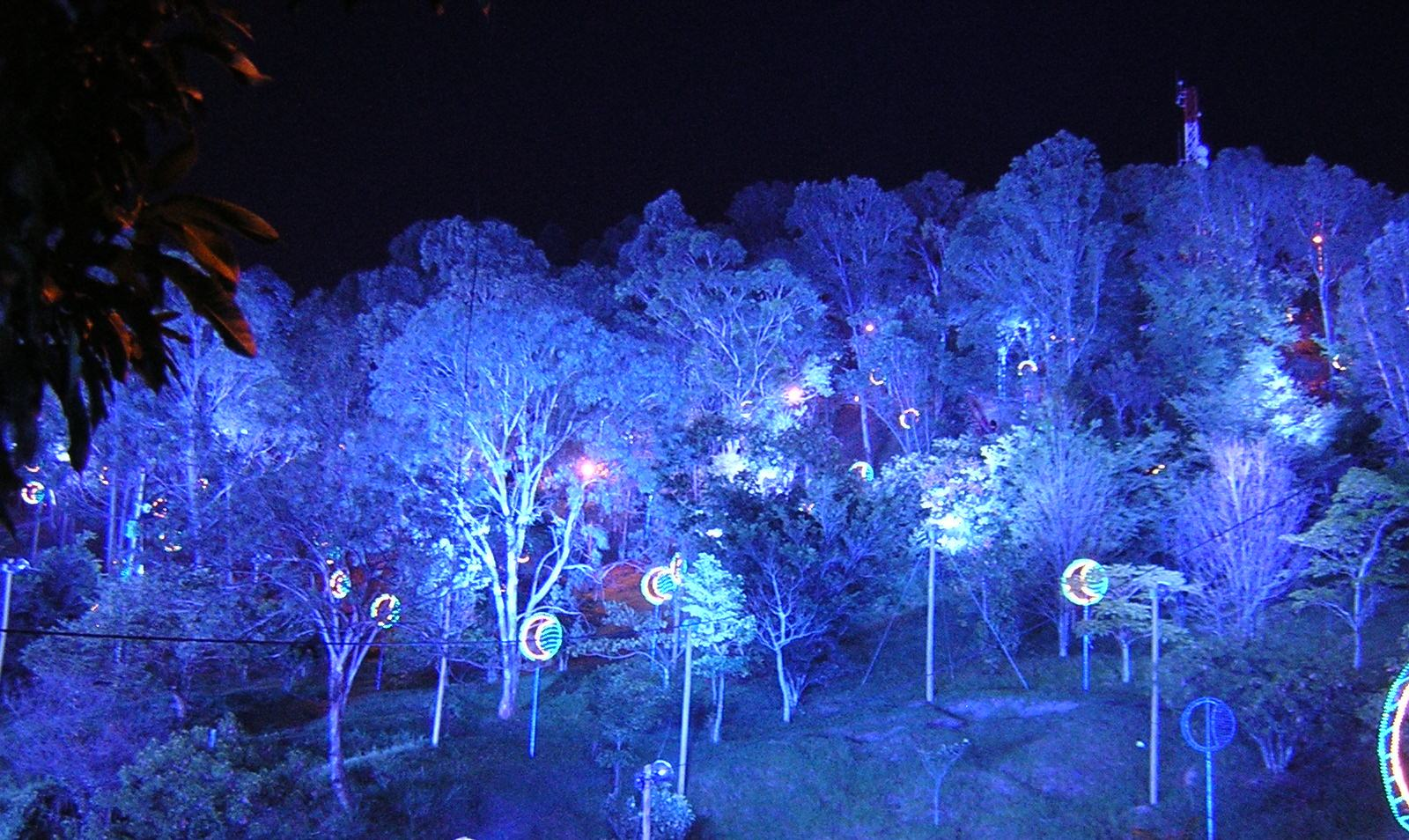
Nutibara during the Christmas lighting of Medellín

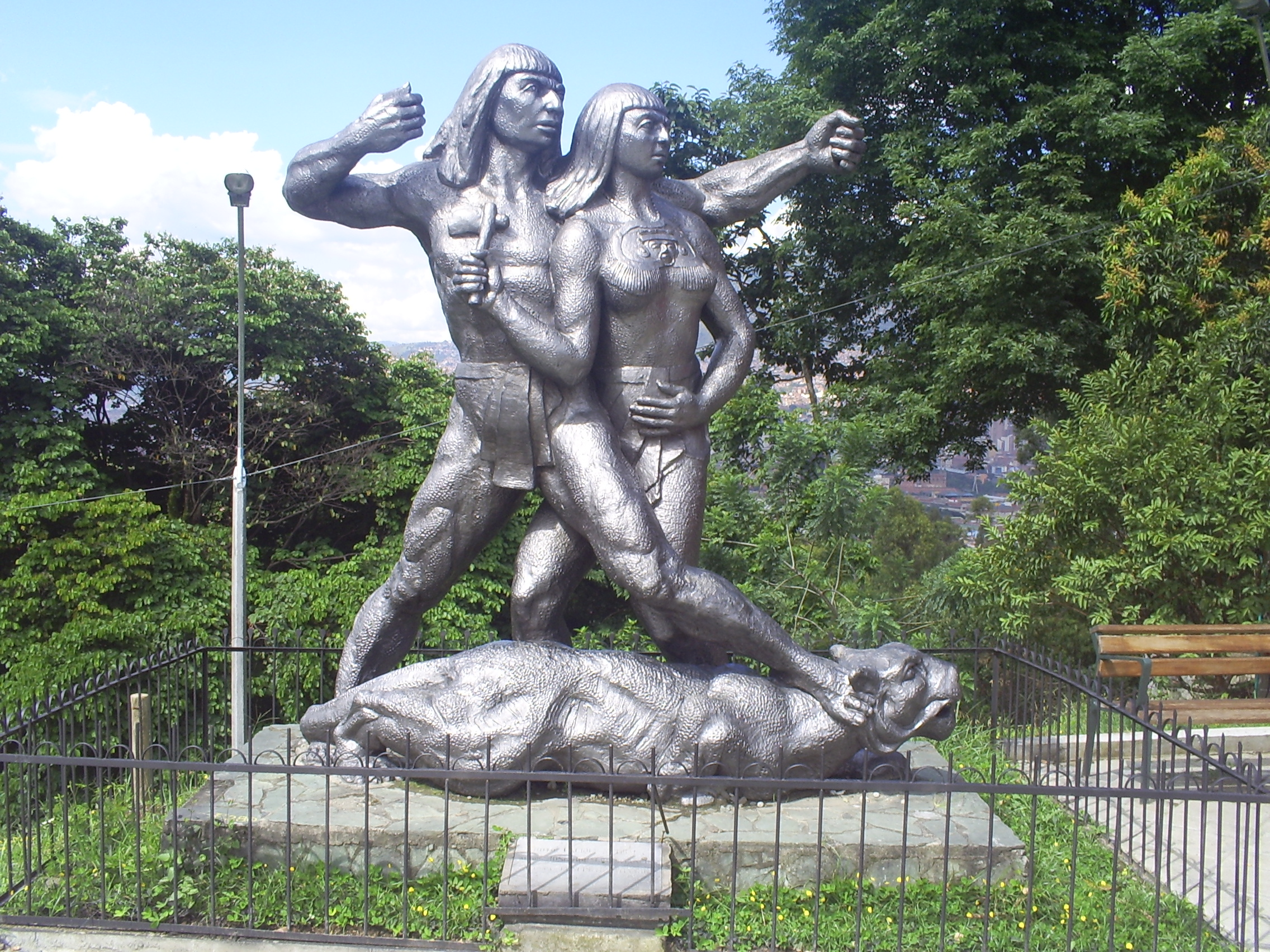
Cacique sculpture

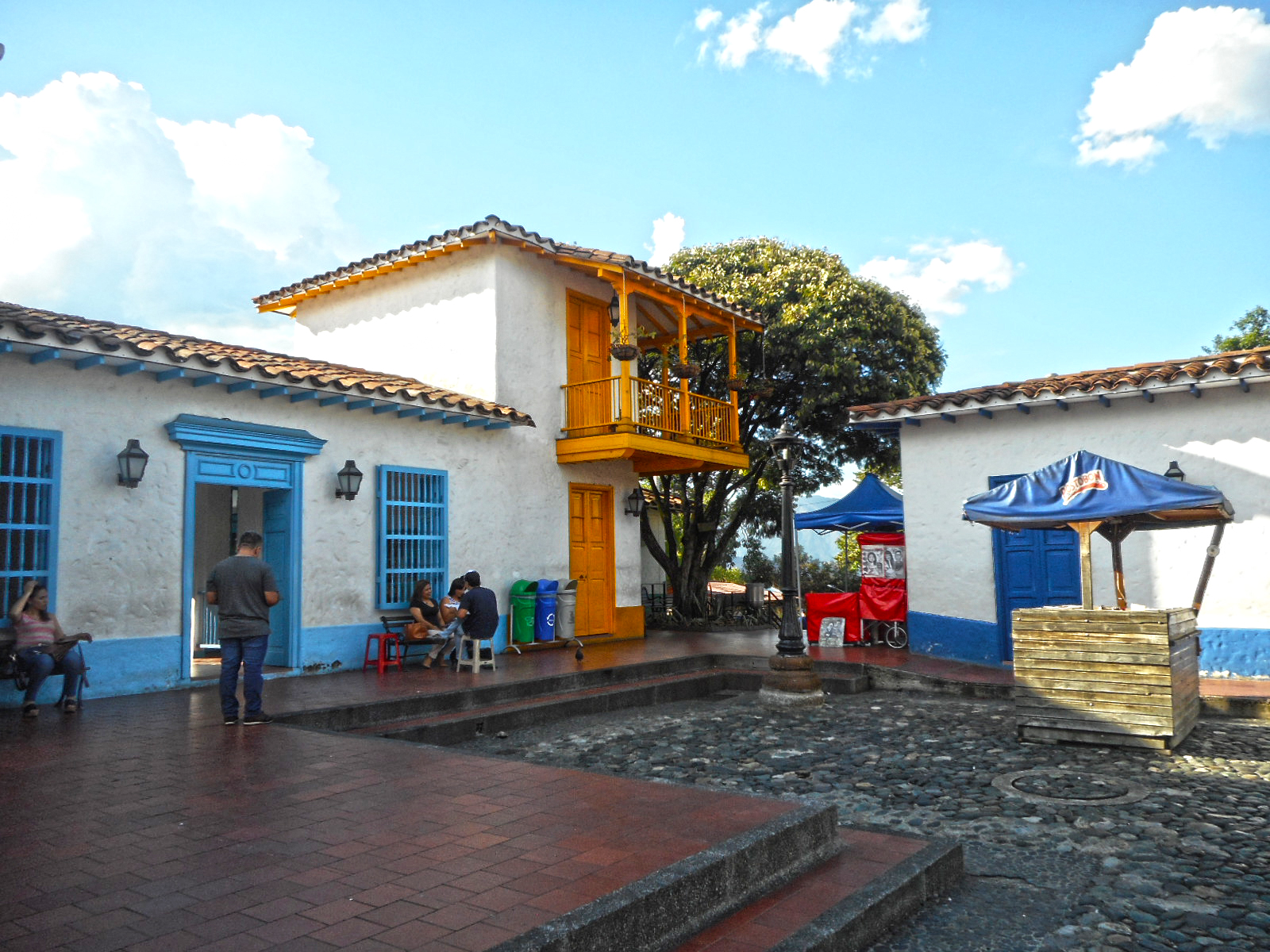
Pueblito Paisa in Nutibara Hill

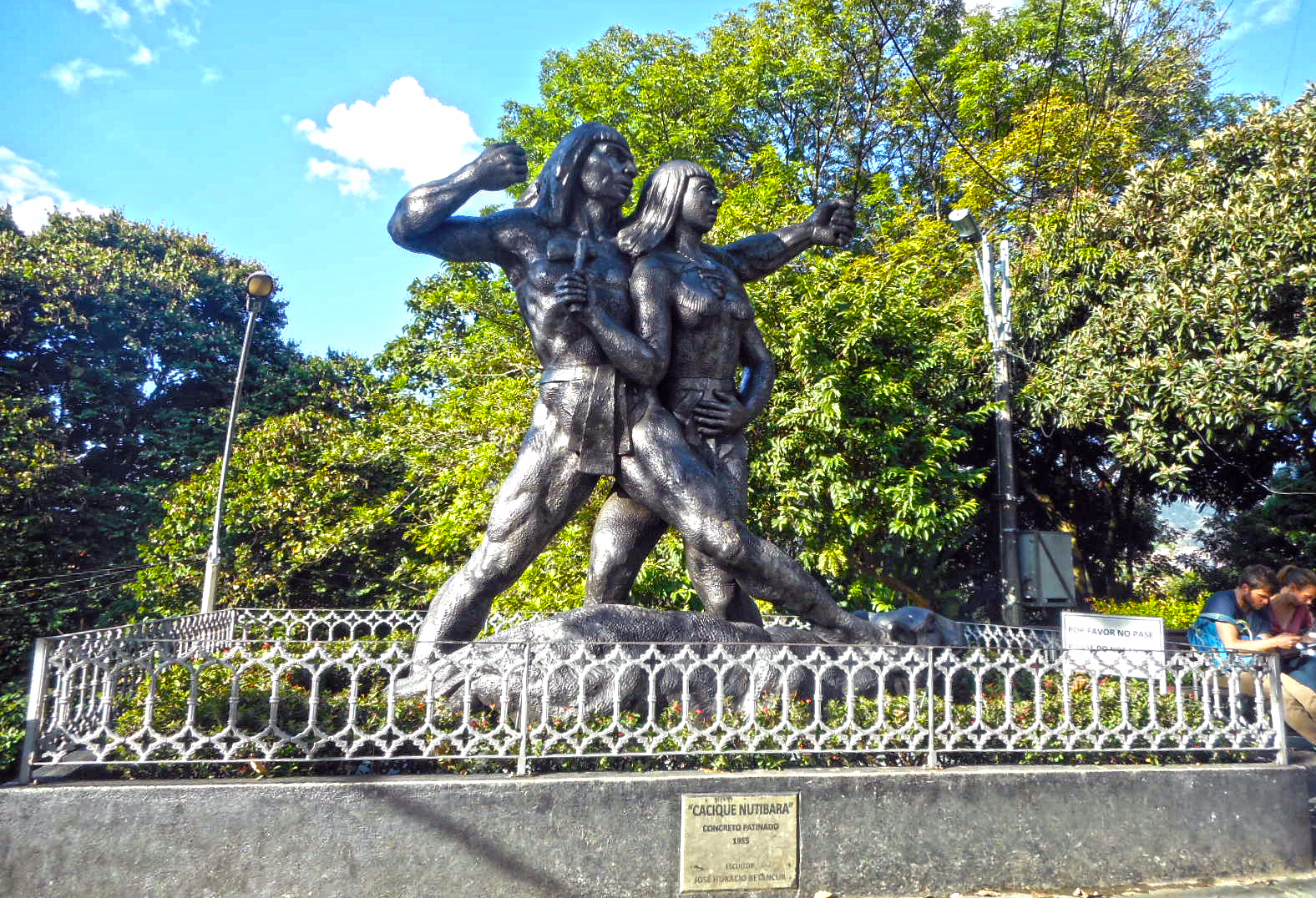
Statue of Cacique Nutibara and wife

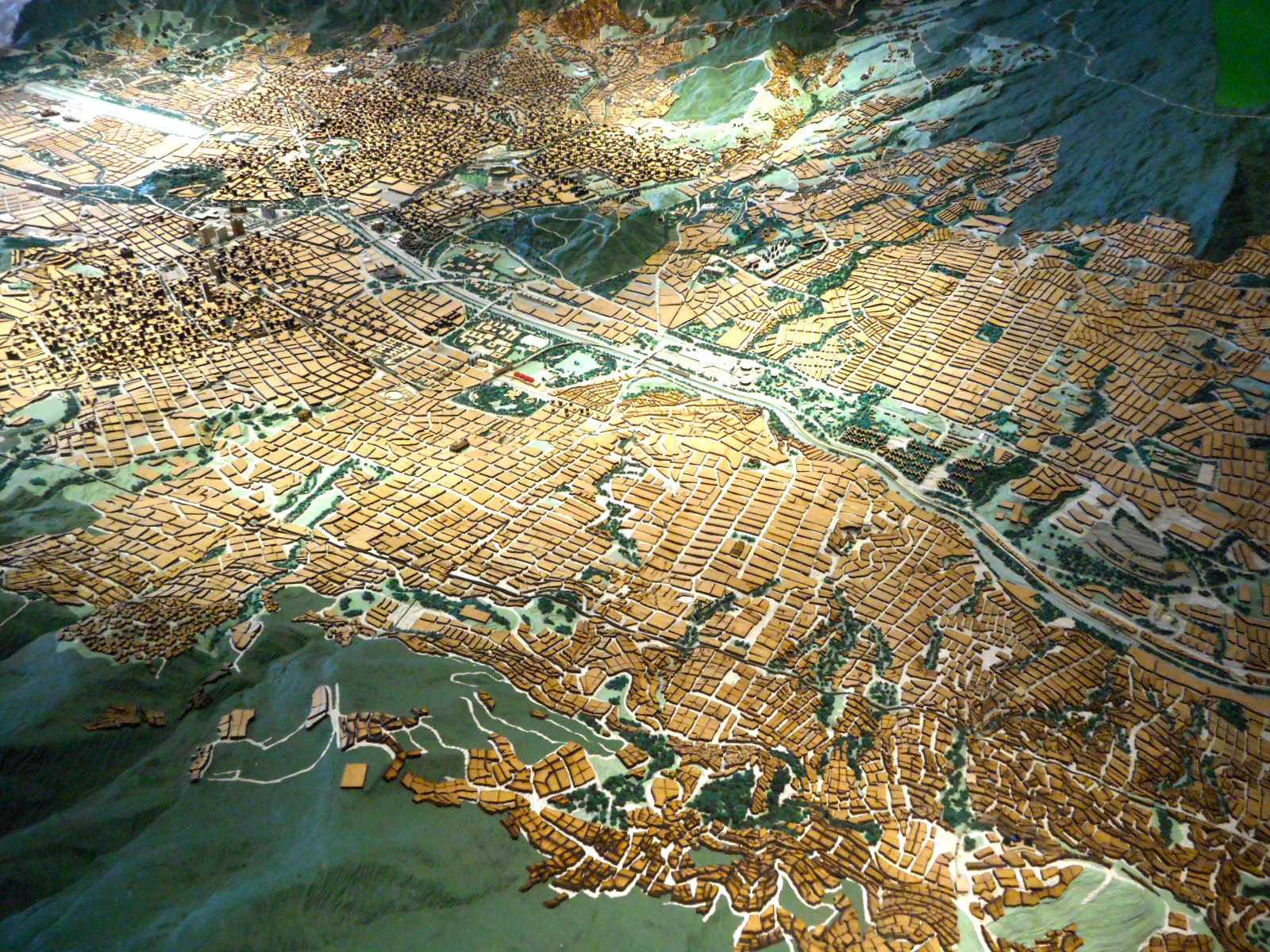
General view of Diorama of City of Medellín

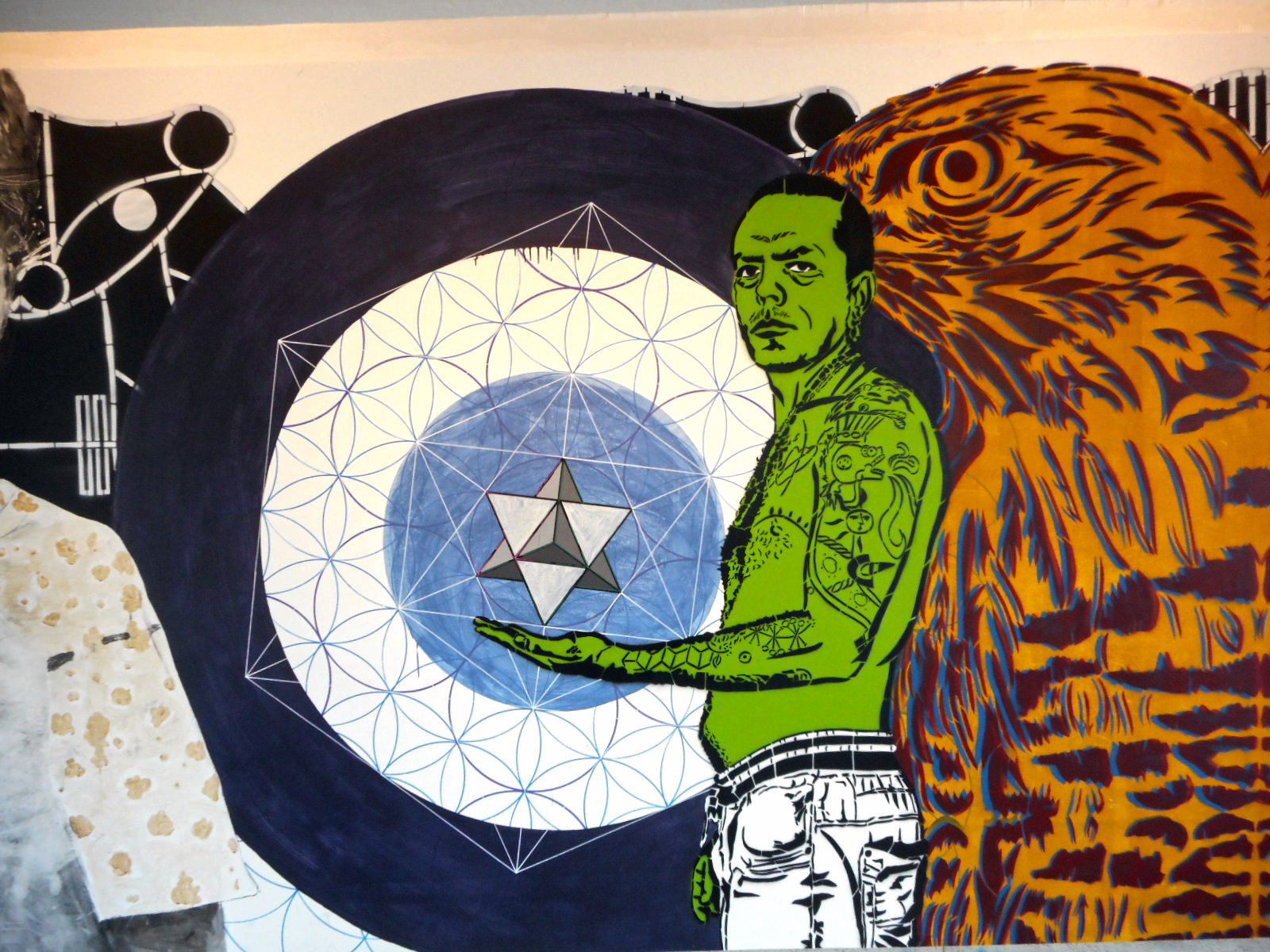
Artwork – Green man

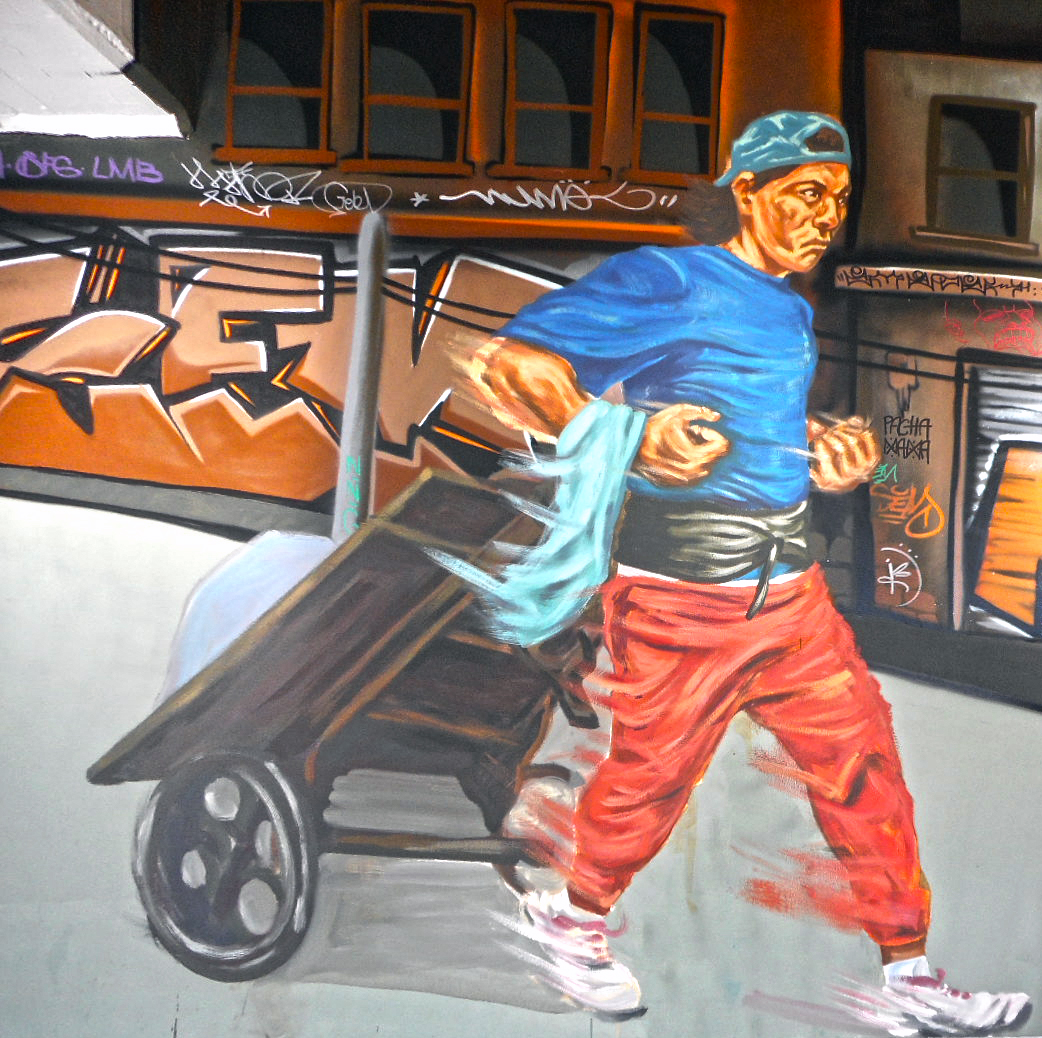
Artwork – Man pulling cart

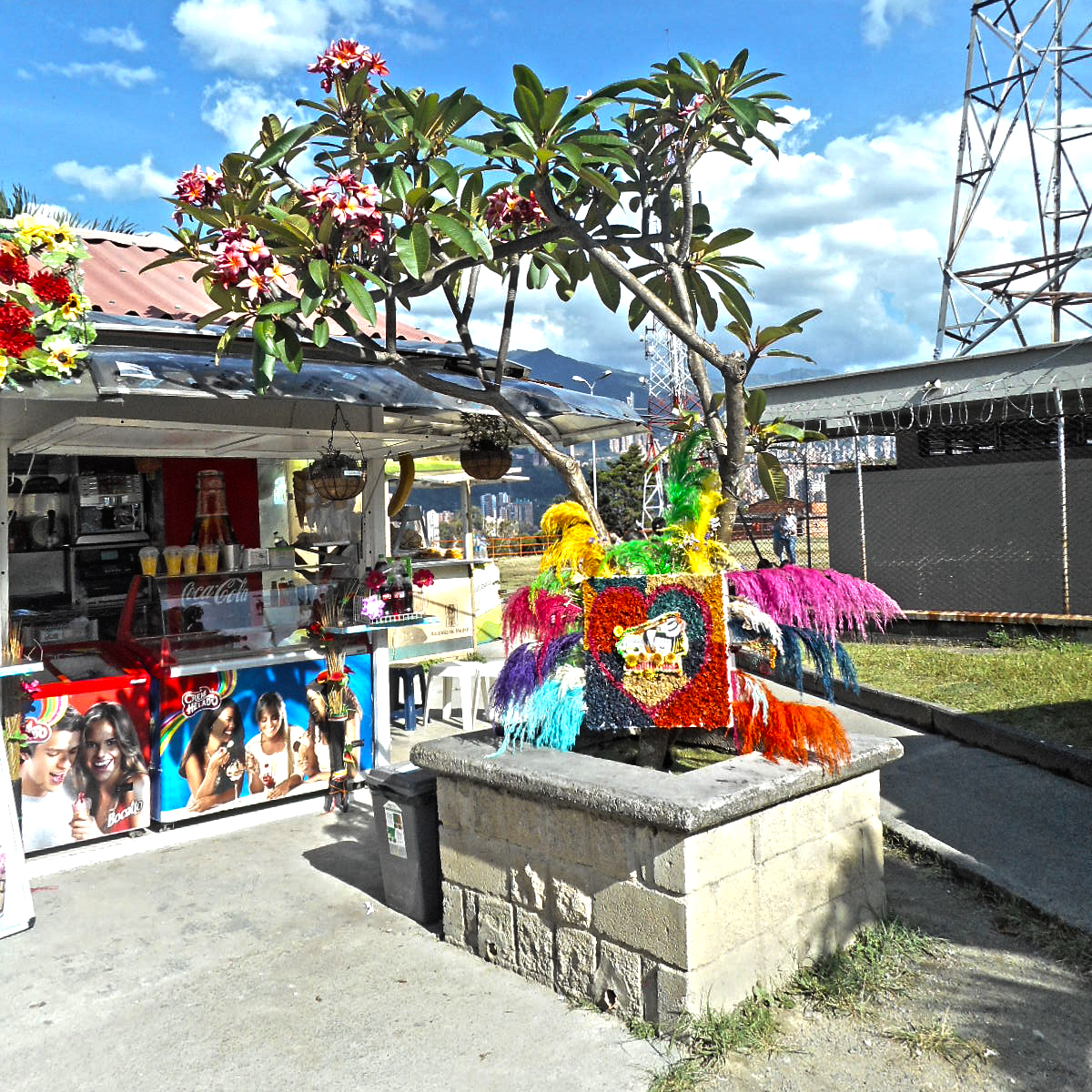
Souvenir stand

== See also ==
- El Volador hill
- Hotel Nutibara
