= La Aurora station =

Medellín Metro station in Colombia

La Aurora Estación La Aurora
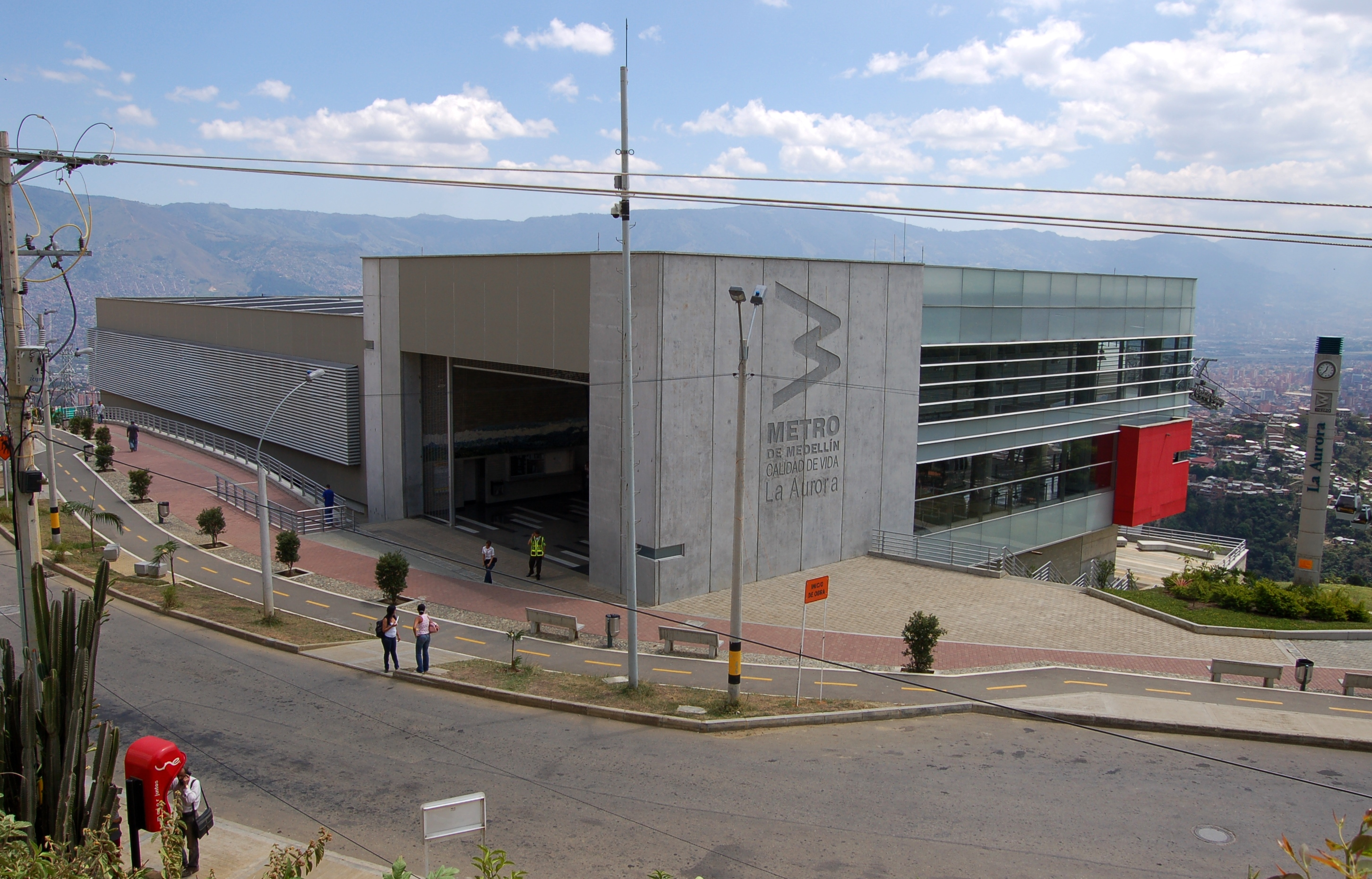
- La Aurora station

General information
- Location: Medellín; Colombia
- Coordinates: 6°16′52″N 75°36′51″W

Services
Preceding station	Medellín Metro	Following station
Terminus	Line J	Vallejuelos towards San Javier
Location

La Aurora is a metrocable station on line J of the Medellín Metro. It is located in the northwest corner of Medellín. La Aurora is the terminal station on line J that goes to La Aurora and Suramericana neighborhoods.
