= El Volador hill =

Hill in Colombia

El Volador
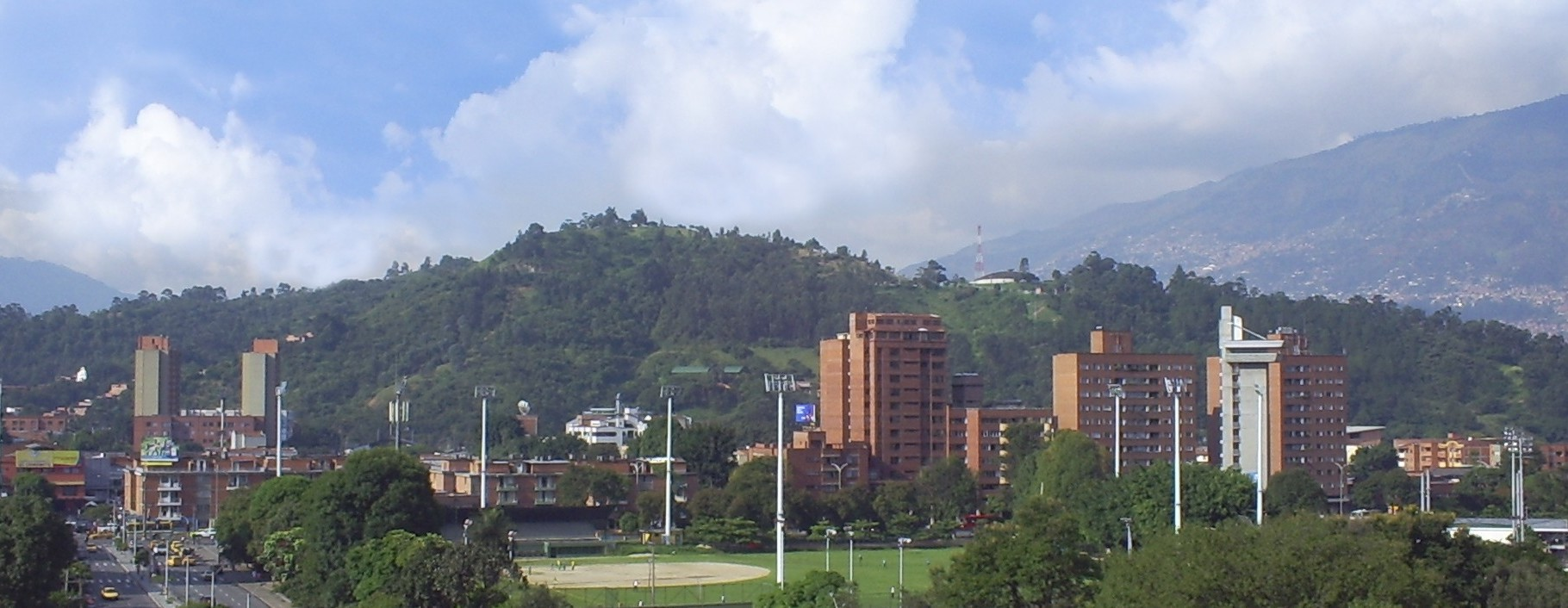
- Ecoparque Cerro El Volador

Highest point
- Elevation: 82 m (269 ft)above mean city level
- Coordinates: 6°16′N 75°35′W

Geography
- Location within Colombia

The Metropolitan Regional Natural Park Cerro El Volador is the largest natural park located within the metropolitan area of Medellín, Colombia. The park comprises 106 hectares and also is one of the seven so-called "guardian hills" in the city. The park was recently renovated in 2014.

Many of the first settlements in the Aburrá Valley were established on the hill in the center-western zone that is today known as the Robledo. This hill is surrounded by the La Iguaná ravine to the south, and by the streams Mononga and La Malpaso to the north. To the east, it is cut off by the 65th street.

The campus of the National University of Colombia and the University of Antioquia are near the hill too; as well, in some paths have been archaeological finds dating from the early centuries of the Christian era, as well as funerary complex from the 14th to 16th centuries caused by the Aburrá people. For these reasons the hill was included as a natural colombian heritage site in 1992, and in 1998 due to the environmental and archaeological wealth it possesses, the hill was named of interest to the nation, by the Culture Ministry.

== See also ==
- National monuments of Colombia
- Nutibara Hill
