= San Javier station =

Medellín metro station

Saint Javier Estación San Javier
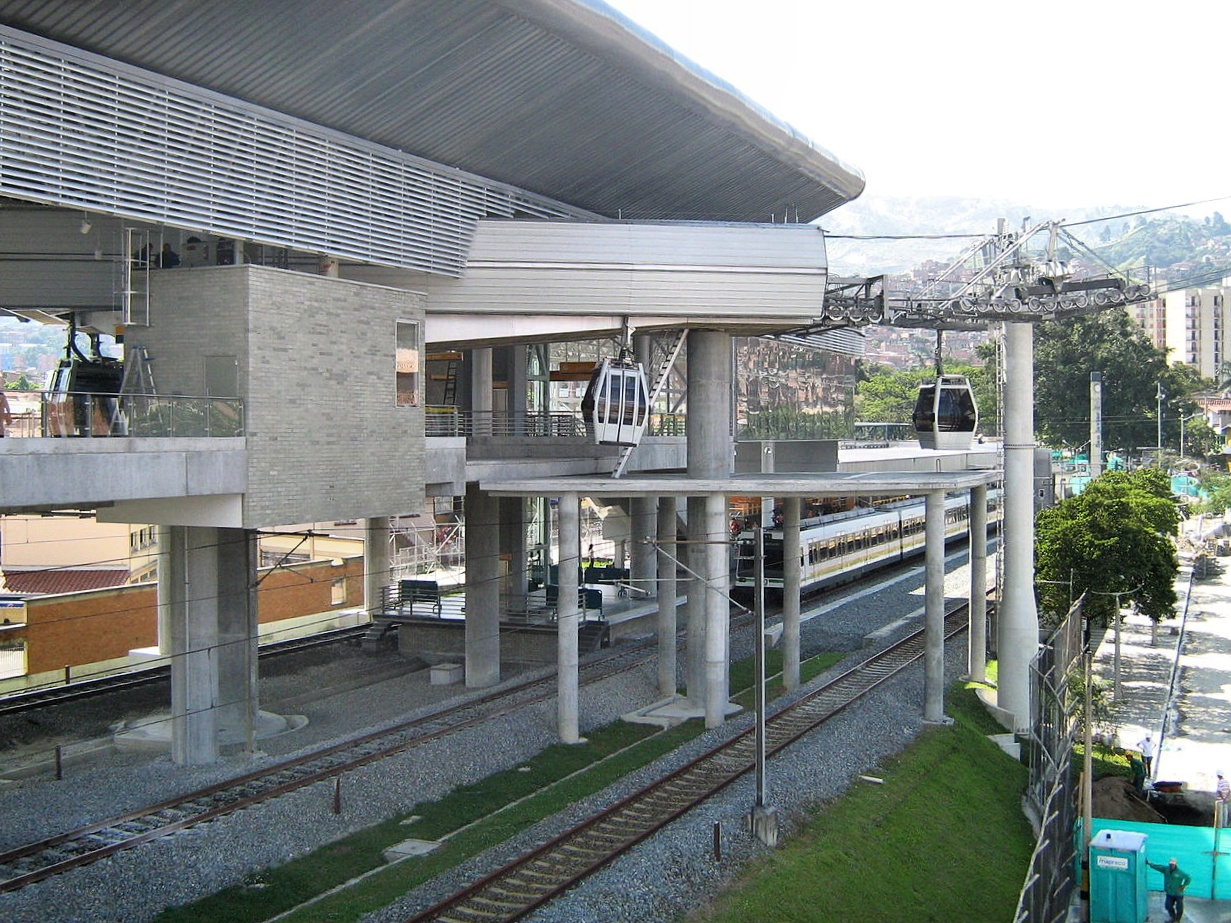

General information
- Location: Medellín; Colombia
- Coordinates: 6°15′25″N 75°36′50″W

History
- Opened: 28 February 1996; 30 years ago

Services
Preceding station	Medellín Metro	Following station
Terminus	Line B	Santa Lucía towards San Antonio
Juan XXIII towards La Aurora	Line J	Terminus
Location

San Javier is the seventh and final station on line B of the Medellín Metro, and a transfer station to line J. It is the most western station and is the only station on line B that is not elevated. The station was opened on 28 February 1996 as part of the inaugural section of line B, from San Javier to San Antonio. In 2008 it was subjected to a process of expansion and remodeling to connect with the new line J, known as Metrocable New West. It is also the only station on the line to have an Island Platform.
