= List of gondola lifts =

This article is a list of gondola lifts around the world. A gondola lift has cabins suspended from a continuously circulating cable, whereas aerial trams simply shuttle back and forth on cables. However, both are cable cars, and both are aerial lifts, which also includes chairlifts. For aerial tramways, see the list of aerial tramways. For funitels, see the funitel article.

Note: this list should not contain aerial tramways or chairlifts.

== Africa ==
=== Algeria ===
- 5 Cableways in Algiers the capital.
- The Constantine Cable Car, linking the two parts of Constantine.
- Oran Cableway, Oran.
- Annaba Cableway, Annaba.
- Skikda Cableway, Skikda.
- Telemcen Cableway, Telemcen.
- Tizi Ouzou Cableway, Tizi Ouzou.

=== Egypt ===
- Ain Sokhna-Gondola above El Sokhna

=== South Africa ===
- Gondola in the National Zoo of South Africa, National Zoological Gardens of South Africa, Pretoria

== Asia ==
=== China ===
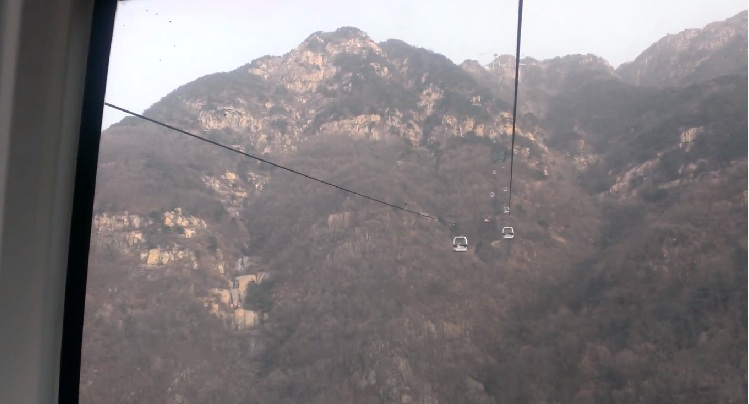
Gondola – At Mount Tai, Shandong

- Access to mountain tops of Zhangjiajie National Forest Park in Hunan
- Access to between the two higher altitude mountain tops of Mount Tai in Shandong
- Huangshan has three cable cars going up the mountain: the Eastern Trail's Yungu Si cable car, The Western Trail's Yuping cable car, and Taiping cable car

=== Hong Kong ===
- Ocean Park, Hong Kong Island – Cable car from Nam Long Shan Headland to Wong Chuk Hang within the Park
- Lantau Island – Ngong Ping 360, a 5.7 km cableway from MTR Tung Chung station to Ngong Ping Terminals near Po Lin Monastery. The cableway is part of the Ngong Ping 360 project.

=== India ===
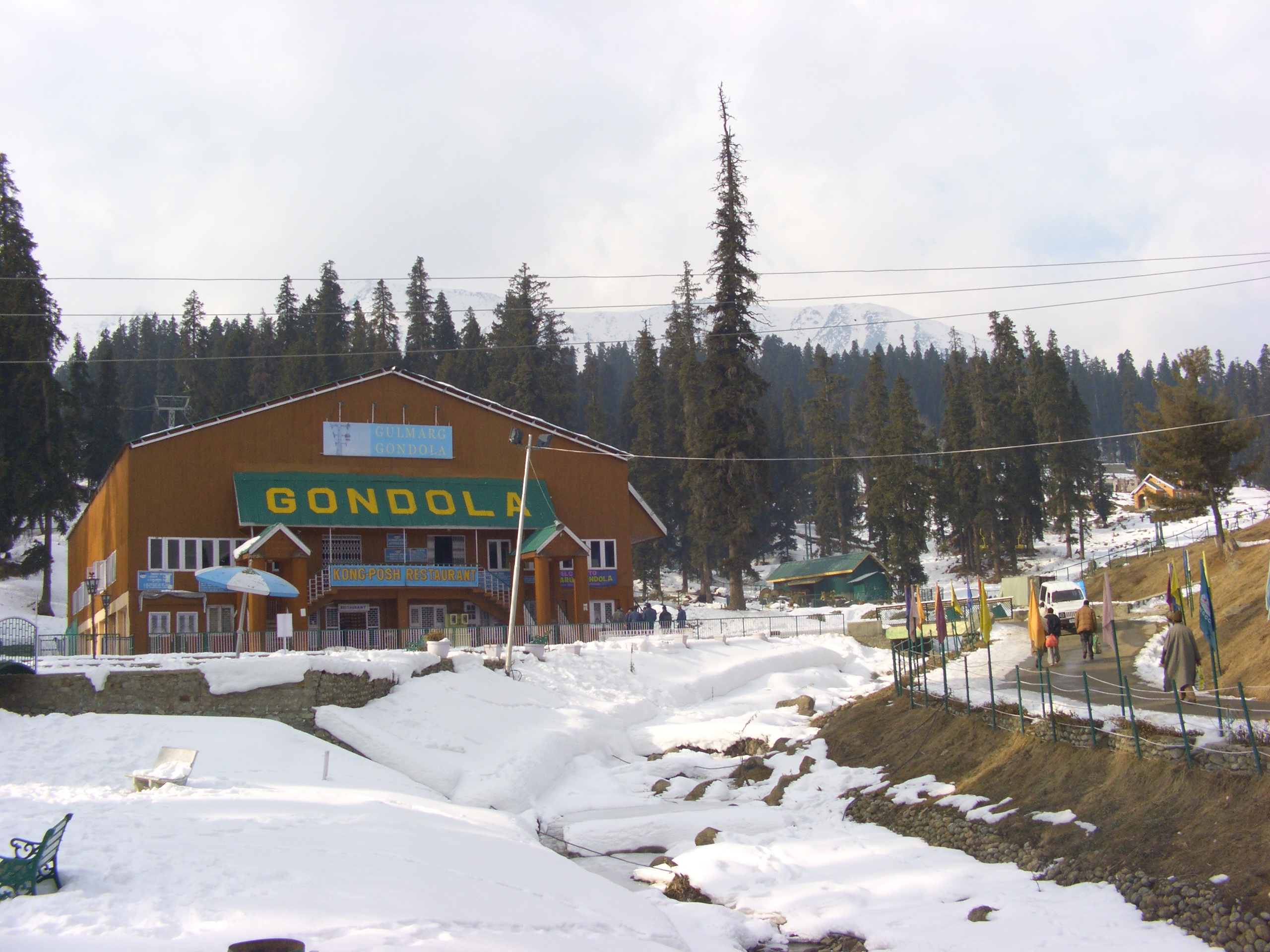
Gulmarg Gondola – The New Cable Car of Gulmarg

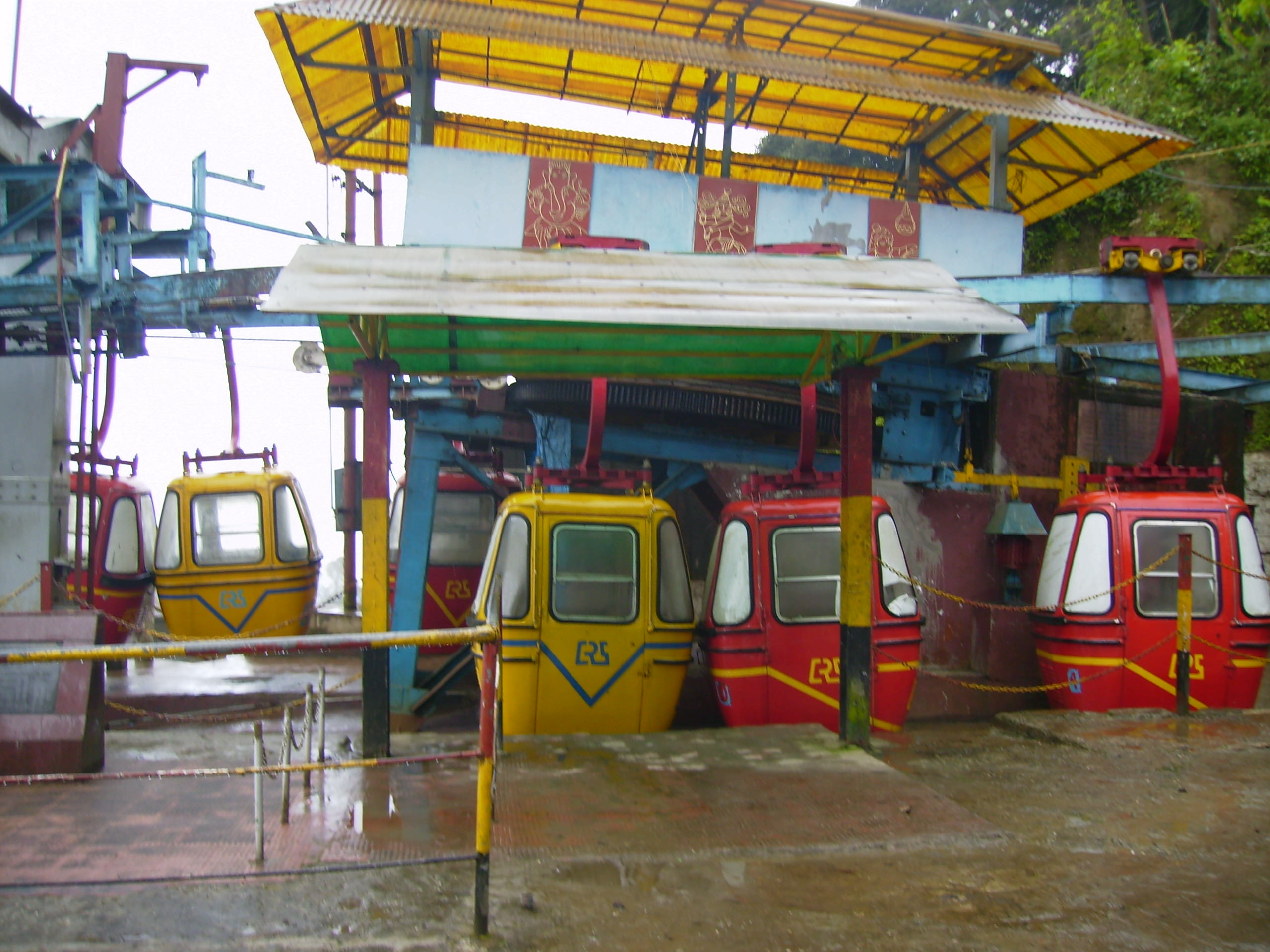
Cable Cars

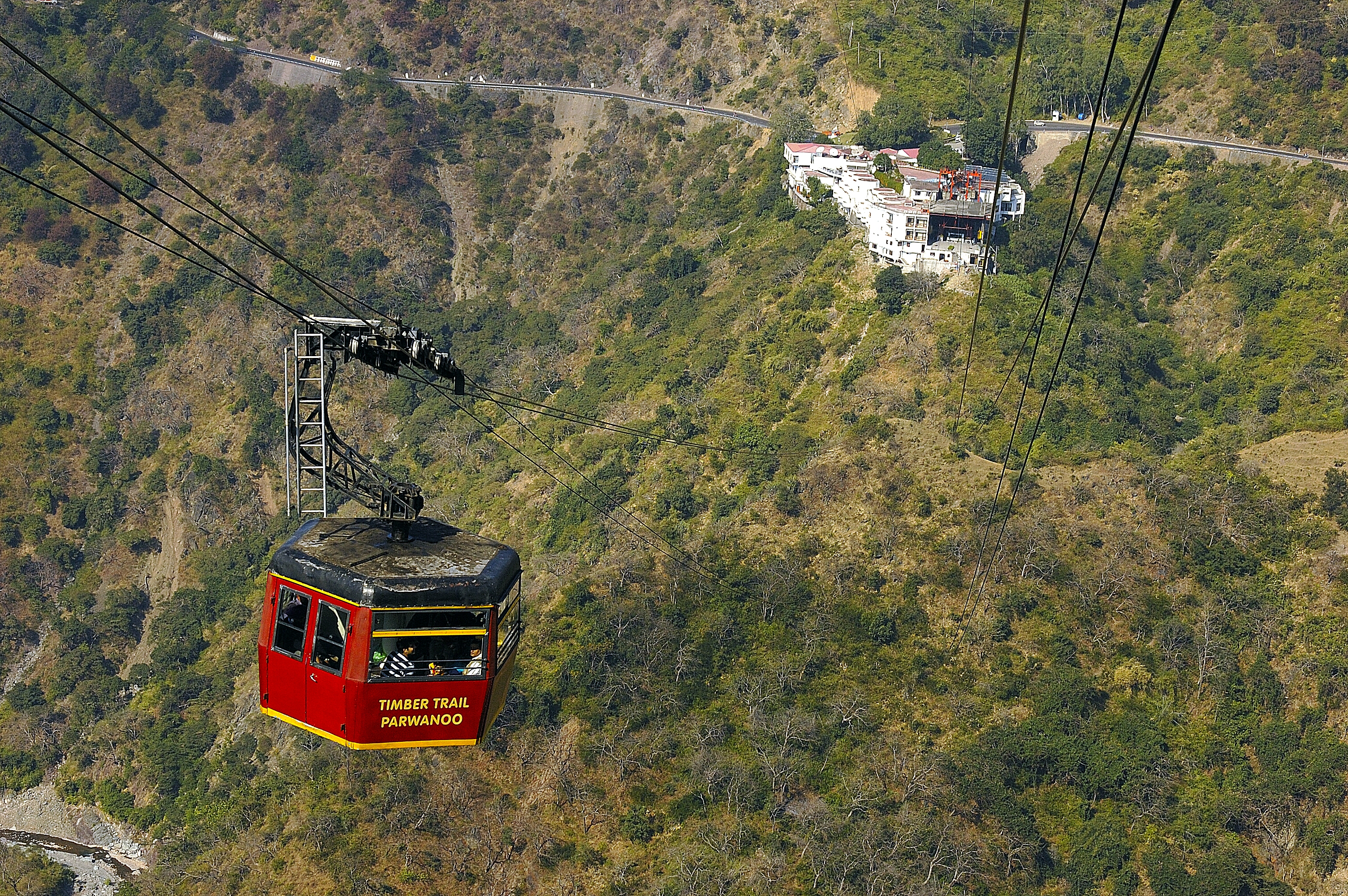
Timber Trail at Parwanoo, Himachal Pradesh

- The Girnar ropeway in Junagadh, Gujarat, is Asia's longest ropeway.
- The Gulmarg Gondola in Jammu and Kashmir, one of the highest in Asia
- The Naina Devi Gondola in the state of Himachal Pradesh
- The Mansa Devi gondola in Haridwar
- Maa Sharada temple ropeway in Maihar Madhya Pradesh, India.
- The Darjeeling Ropeway Gondola at Darjeeling in West Bengal
- The Timber Trail at Parwanoo in Himachal Pradesh
- The Solang Valley Ropeway near Manali, Himachal Pradesh
- The under-construction Dharamshala ropeway connecting Dharamshala and Mcleodganj, in Himachal Pradesh
- The Vaity Ropeway Resort, Saputara, Gujarat
- The Joshimath – Auli Ropeway, Auli
- The Dhuan Dhaar Ropeway, Jabalpur in Madhya Pradesh
- The Ropeway Over Gangtok City in Sikkim
- The Naini Jheel from the Ropeway, Nainital
- The Khotala Ropeway
- The Kolkata Science City Ropeway in Kolkata
- The Mussoorie Ropeway in Mussoorie
- The Udaipur Ropeway, Udaipur
- The Ropeway Ride in Rajgir, Bihar
- The Ambaji ropeway in Ambaji, Gujarat
- The Malampuzha Udan Khatola in Malampuzha, Kerala
- The Raigad Ropeway in Maharashtra
- Jakhu Ropeway, Shimla
- Deoghar Ropeway, Jharkhand
- Dongargarh Ropeway in Chhattisgarh
- Glenmorgan Ropeway, Tamil Nadu
- Srisailam Ropeway, Andhra Pradesh-Telangana
- Patnitop Ropeway, Jammu and Kashmir

=== Indonesia ===
- Ancol Gondola, Ancol Jakarta Bay City, Jakarta
- TMII Lifts, Taman Mini Indonesia Indah, Jakarta
- Taman Safari Indonesia, Cisarua
- Kumala Island, Tenggarong (now defunct)
- Guci Cable Car, Tegal

=== Iran ===
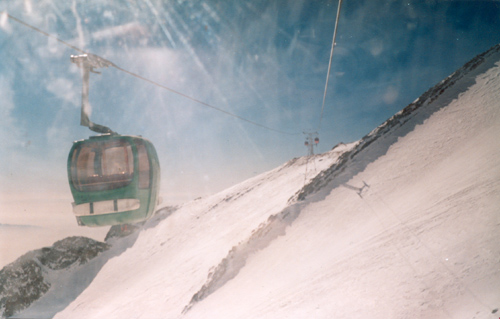
Iran's Tochal gondola lift: The French (Poma) built gondolas that carry tourists and skiers to Tochal mountain, Iran

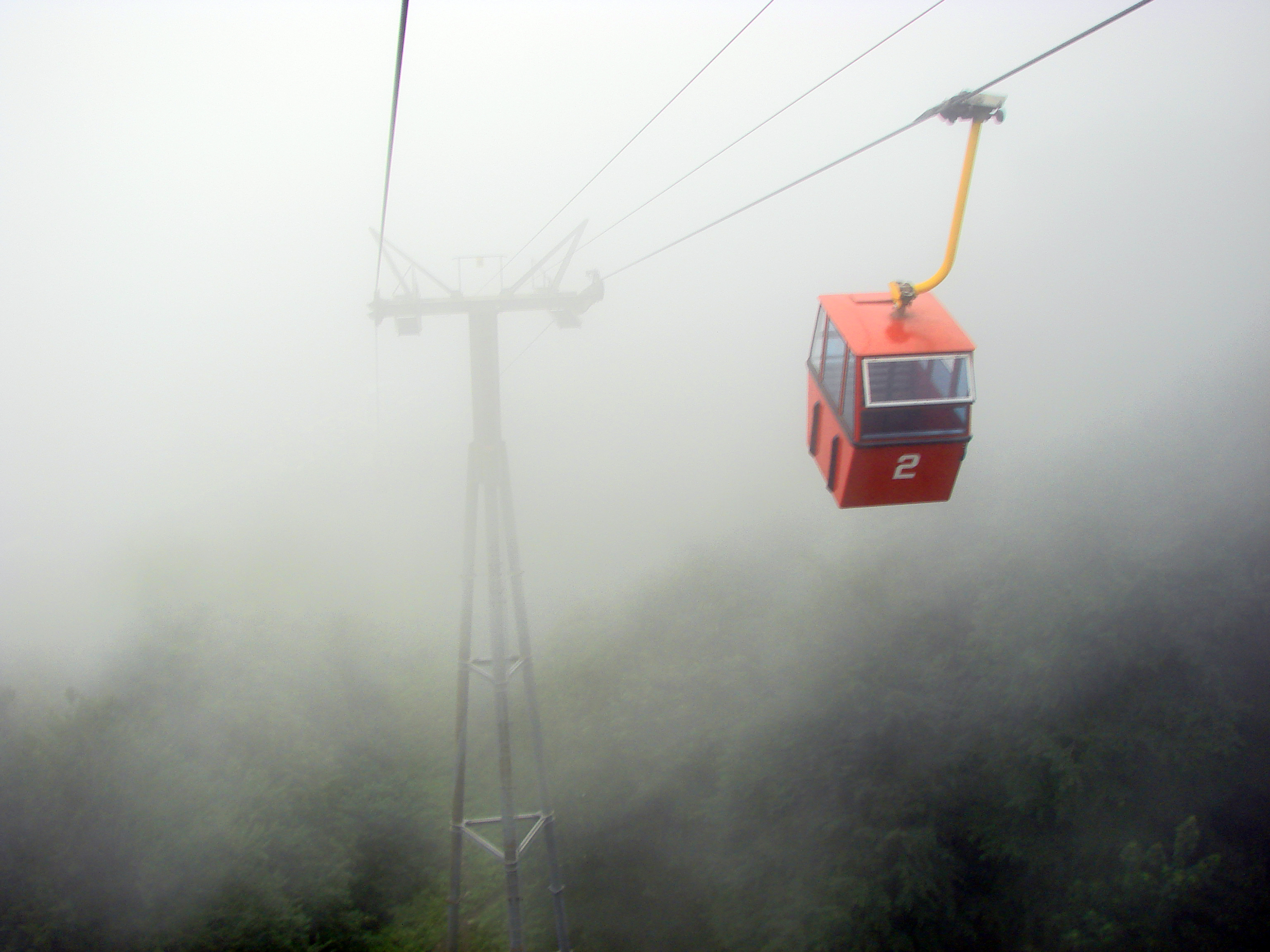
Namakabrud's gondola lift

- Dizin ski resort on the north mountains of Tehran at Gajereh region includes three gondola lifts. The lowest point of the region is 2650 m, while its highest point is 3600 m above the sea level.
- The Pooladkaf gondola lift in Pooladkaf ski resort, near Sepidan, on the north mountains of Shiraz at Fars region. Elevation of this lift is from 2810 to 3231 meters from sea level.
- The Tochal gondola lift (Tele-cabin) from metropolitan Tehran to the Tochal Ski Resort
- Namakab Rud gondola lift in Mazandaran Province in northern Iran. It cuts through a lush forest and connects the Alborz, one of the highest summits in the region, to the villa city on the coast of the Caspian Sea.
- Lahijan Cable Car in the Gilan province
- Eynali Cable in the north of Tabriz.

=== Israel ===
- Kibbutz Manara cliff cable cars, Upper Galilee – a vital connection to the valley below. It lifts people from Kiryat Shmona to Kibbutz Manara at the top of Manara Cliff.
- Haifa Rakavlit – a part of the city's expanded public transport system complementing the existing city bus and Metronit BRT lines.

=== Japan ===
Among 170 aerial lifts in Japan, 97 lines are gondola lifts, including 3 funitels. 65 gondola lifts operate full season. See the above article for the full listing of aerial lifts in the country (including aerial tramways). Gondola lifts with English articles include:

- Dragondola, Naeba, Yuzawa, Niigata, is the longest aerial lift in Japan (5.5 km), as well as the fastest gondola lift in the country (6 m/s)
- SP Gondola, Takasu Snow Park, Gujō, Gifu, also runs at 6 m/s
- Gozaisho Ropeway, Komono, Mie
- Katsuragiyama Ropeway, Izunokuni, Shizuoka
- Nikkō Shiranesan Ropeway, Katashina, Gunma
- Rusutsu Resort, Rusutsu, Hokkaidō
- Shin-Kōbe Ropeway, Kōbe, Hyōgo
- Sky Safari, Himeji Central Park, Himeji, Hyōgo
- Yokohama Air Cabin; Yokohama, Kanagawa

=== Kazakhstan ===
- The Medeu – Shymbulak gondola links the sports complex Medeu and the ski resort Shymbulak in Almaty.

=== Lebanon ===
- The Teleferique connects the bay of Jounieh, a city 16 km north of the capital Beirut, to Harissa's Our Lady of Lebanon pilgrimage monument at about 650 meters above sea level. It is 1,570 meters long and travels at 3.15 m/s speed. It holds an exceptional view to the Mediterranean, as well as a dense pine forest.

=== Macau ===
- Cable Guia
- Wynn Palace – The gondola lifts are an attraction within the hotel complex.

=== Malaysia ===
- Genting Skyway, connecting Gohtong Jaya to the hilltop resort of Genting Highlands, is one of the fastest gondola lift in Asia (6 m/s), and was the longest cable car in Southeast Asia
- Awana Skyway, connecting Awana Transport Hub, Chin Swee Temple and SkyAvenue in Genting Highlands, they are among the strongest monocable gondola installations in the world
- Langkawi Cable Car connects to Gunung Mat Cincang in the Langkawi Archipelago; this system has the longest free span for a mono-cable car at 950 m (3,120 ft) as well as one of the world's steepest with a 42° gradient.

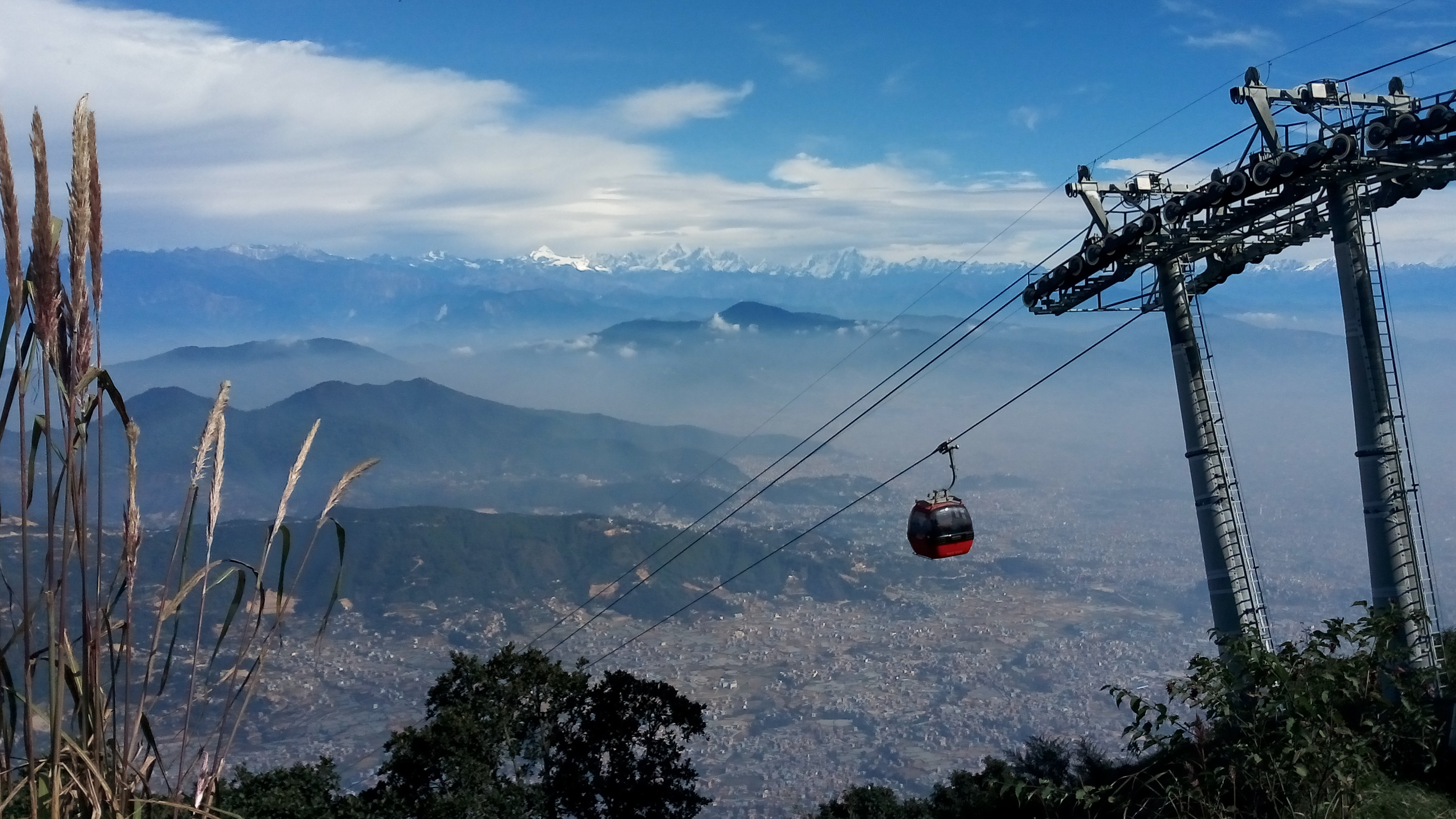
Chandragiri Cable Car, Kathmandu

=== Nepal ===
- Manakamana Cable Car – Access to the very religiously regarded remote Manakamana Temple
- Chandragiri Cable Car from Thankot to Chandragiri hills.
- Kalinchowk Bhagwati Temple Cable car – Operates from Kuri village in Dolakha District to the temple on the hill nearby.
- Annapurna Cable Car – Operates from Lakeside in Pokhara to Sarangkot.

=== Pakistan ===
- Ayubia National Park gondola lift

=== Saudi Arabia ===
- A lift in the Sooda Region and one over the Abha city

=== Singapore ===
- The Singapore Cable Car from Mount Faber to Sentosa Island; interesting in that it has an intermediate stop in a highrise building.

=== South Korea ===
- Muju Resort
- Yongpyong Ski Resort
- High1 Resort
- Yeosu Maritime Cable Car, Yeosu
- Mokpo Marine Cable Car, Mokpo
- Songdo Cable Car, Busan

=== Taiwan ===
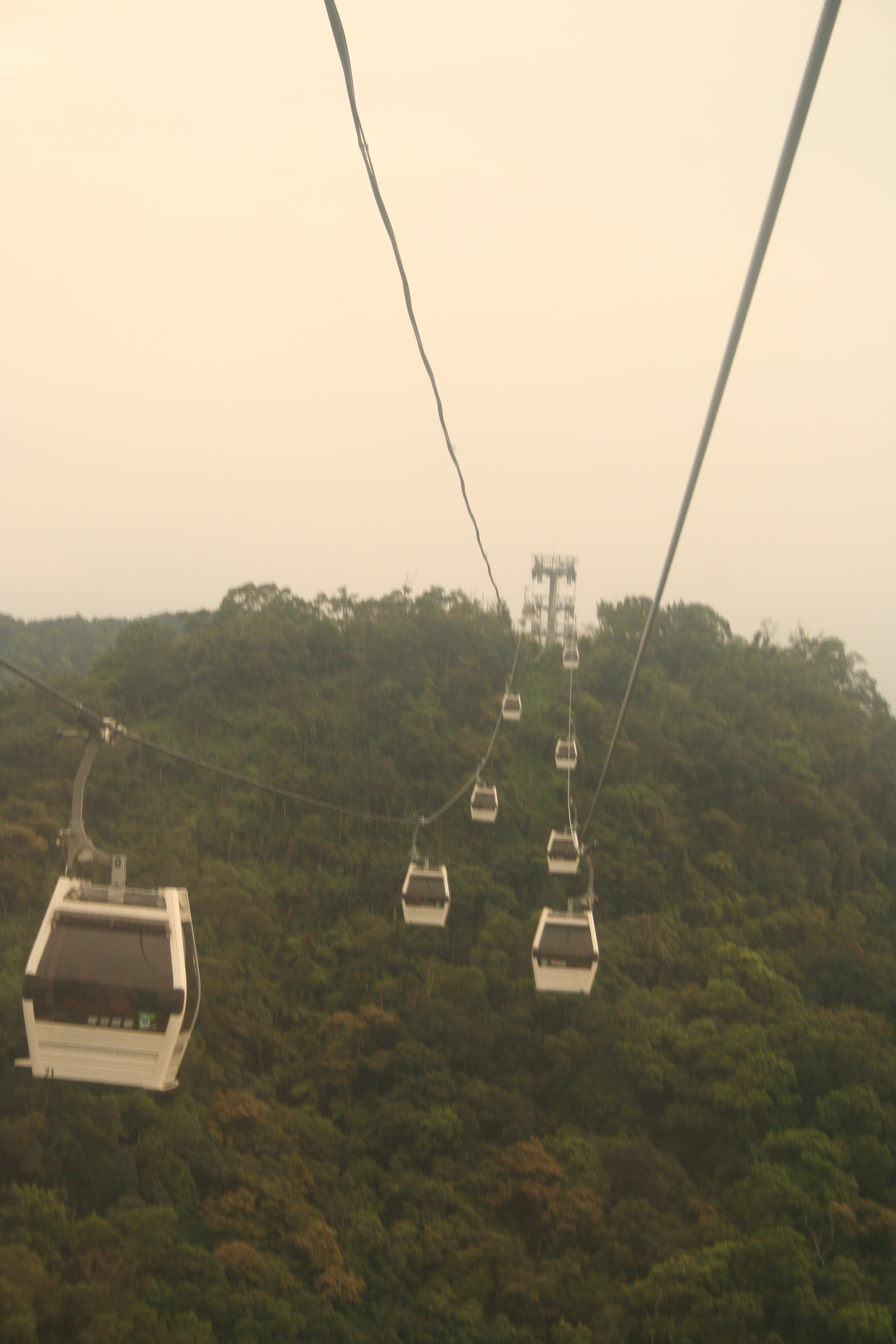
Maokong Gondola, Taipei

- Maokong Gondola, Taipei
- Formosan Aboriginal Culture Village Cable Car
- Hualien Ocean Park Gondola
- Sun Moon Lake Ropeway in Nantou County
- Wulai Gondola in New Taipei

Proposed

- Jiufen Cable Car

=== Thailand ===
- Cable Car, Dream World, Pathum Thani

=== Vietnam ===
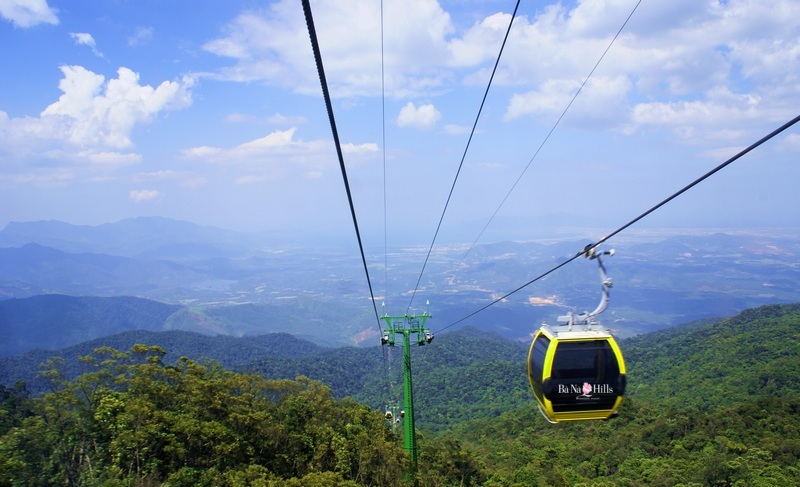
Bà Nà Hills Cable Car

- Bà Nà Hills, Da Nang
- Chua Huong cableway
- Xuan Huong gondola, Đà Lạt
- Huong Tich gondola, Hà Tĩnh
- Nui Ba Den gondola, Tây Ninh
- Nui Lon gondola, Vũng Tàu
- Ta Cu cableway, Bình Thuận
- Yên Tử gondola, Yên Tử Mountain

== Europe ==
=== Albania ===
- "Dajti Express", from Tirana to Mount Dajt

=== Andorra ===
- La Massana in Pal sector, Vallnord ski resort
- Els Orriols in Arinsal sector, Vallnord ski resort
- Soldeu in Soldeu sector, Grandvalira ski resort
- El Tarter in El Tarter sector, Grandvalira ski resort
- Canillo in Canillo sector, Grandvalira ski resort

=== Austria ===
More than 90 Austrian ski resorts have gondola lifts for eight or more passengers, with more than 270 individual lifts in operation.

=== Azerbaijan ===
- Zaqatala
- Shahdag Mountain Resort
- Tufan Dag

=== Bulgaria ===
- Poma, Borovetz – Rila mntn
- Poma, Kartala – Rila mntn
- Doppelmayr, Sofia – Vitosha mntn
- Doppelmayr, Bansko – Pirin mntn

=== Bosnia and Herzegovina ===
- Sarajevo Cable Car

=== Croatia ===
- Dubrovnik, to the top of the Srđ mountain
- Zagreb cable car, a 5017 m line from the city to the top of Medvednica

=== Finland ===
- Levi 2000 in Levi Ski Resort, year of construction 1999, route 1.41 km.
- Levi Express in Levi Ski Resort, year of construction 2007
- Ylläs 1 in Ylläs Ski Resort, year of construction 2007, route 2.01 km.

=== France ===
- Luchon Superbagnères

=== Georgia ===
- Rike Park – Narikala, Tbilisi
- Freedom Square – Sololaki, Tbilisi
- Sololaki – Tabori, Tbilisi
- Argo, Batumi
- GoodAura, Gudauri
- Goodauri – Bidara – Pass Gudauri
- Pass – Kobi Gudauri
- Zanka, Goderdzi
- Nodo, Bakuriani

=== Germany ===
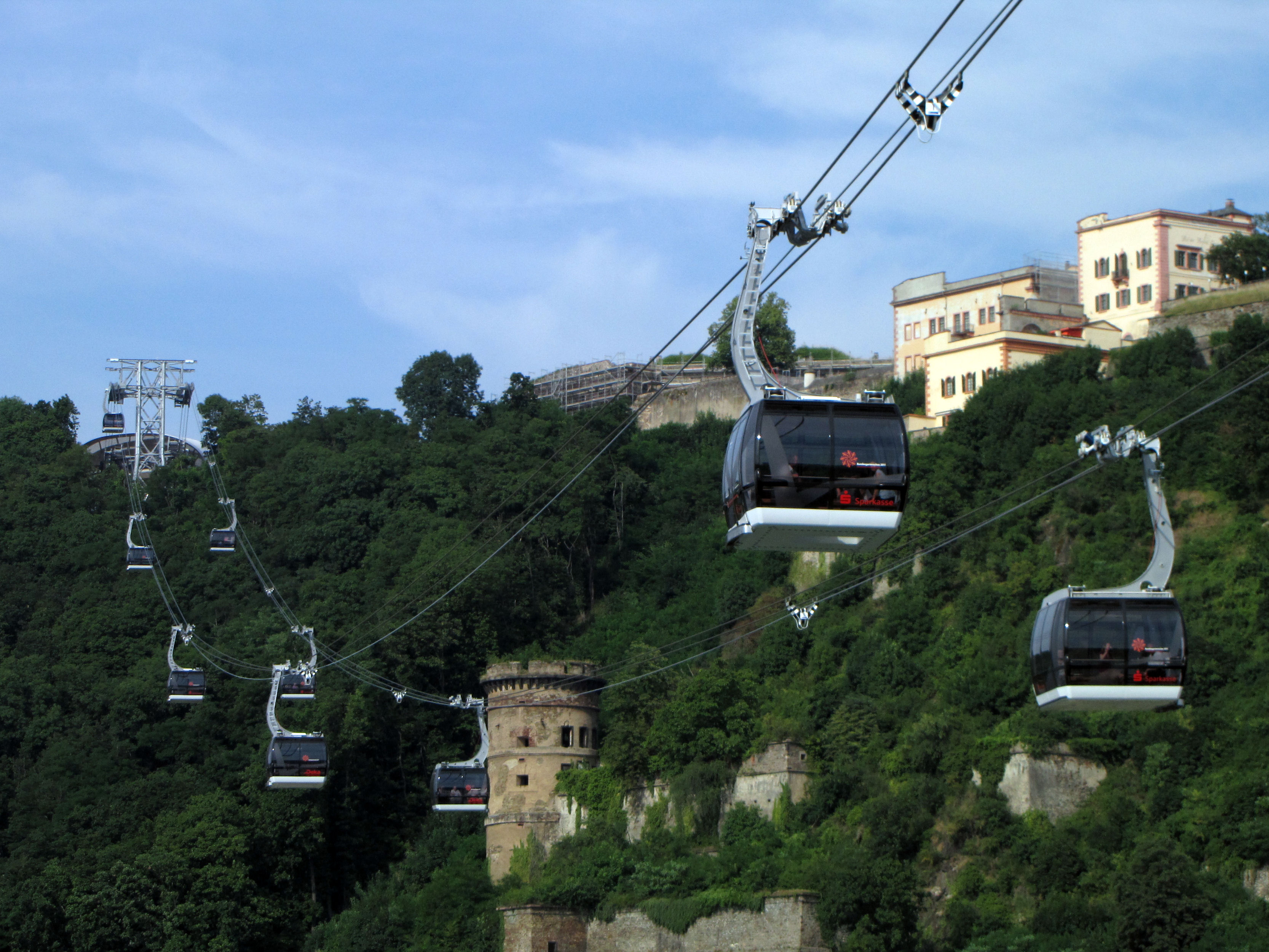
The Koblenz Cable Car is Germany's largest aerial lift

- Bad Dürkheim lift (shut down)
- IGA Cable Car, Berlin
- Bode Valley Gondola Lift, Thale, Lower Saxony
- Cologne Cable Car, Cologne
- Koblenz Cable Car, Koblenz, Germany's largest aerial lift
- Schauinslandbahn
- Wurmberg Gondola Lift, Braunlage
- Seilbahn Rüdesheim am Rhein, Hessen

=== Greece ===
- Santorini cable car on Santorini

=== Hungary ===
- Dongo gondola in Sátoralyaujhely

=== Italy ===
- Bormio
- Aprica
- Livigno
- Santa Caterina Valfurva
- Trapani–Erice Cable Car
- Passo Del Tonale

=== Montenegro ===
- Kotor Cable Car

=== North Macedonia ===
- Skopje

=== Norway ===
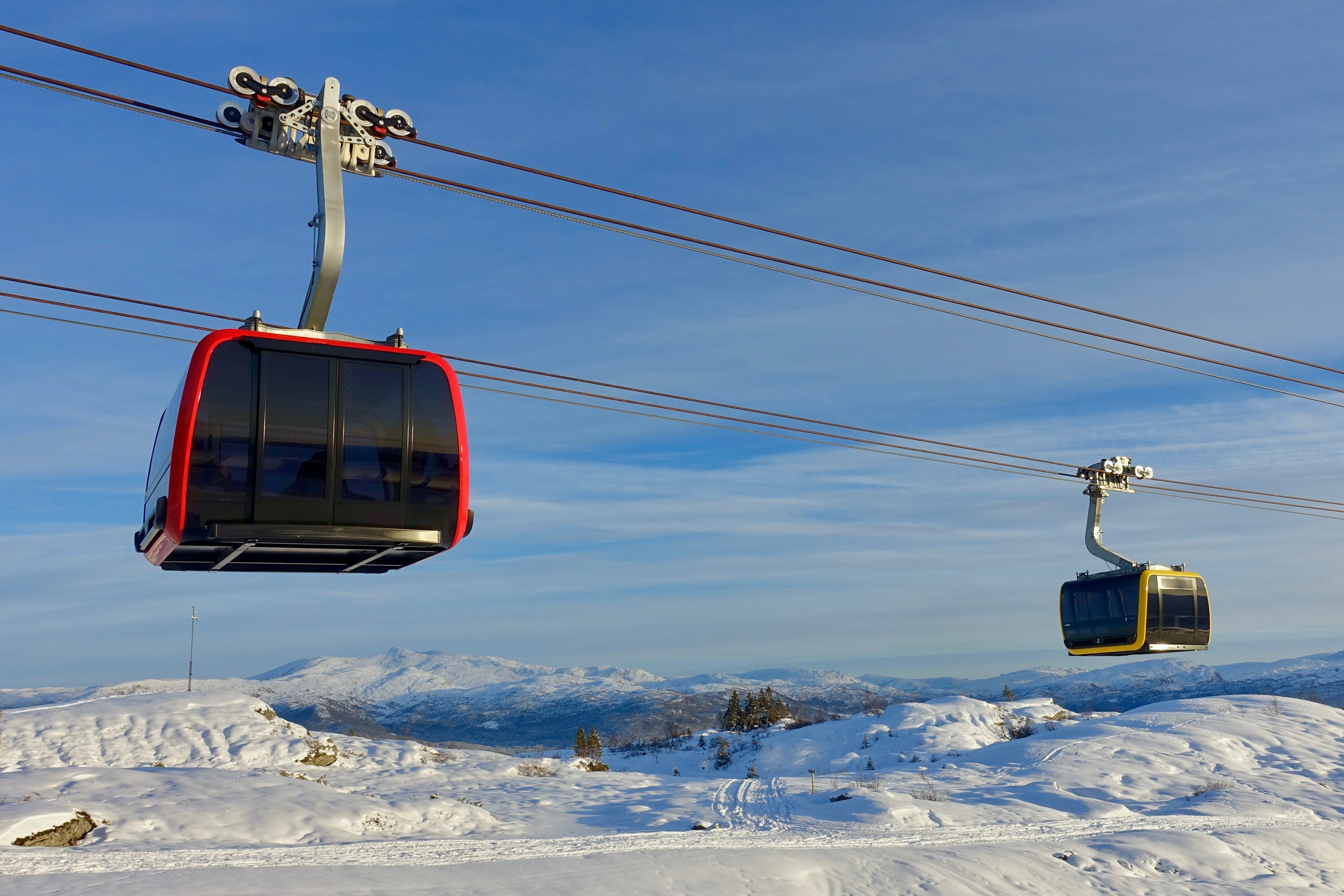
Voss Gondol in Voss.

- Tromsø – Fjellheisen – Tourist lift
- Åndalsnes – Romsdalsgondolen – Tourist lift, the longest in Norway opened in 2021.
- Bergen – Ulriksbanen – Tourist lift
- Hafjell – Ski lift
- Voss – Voss Gondol – Ski lift

=== Poland ===
- Bielsko-Biała – Szyndzielnia – Ski gondola

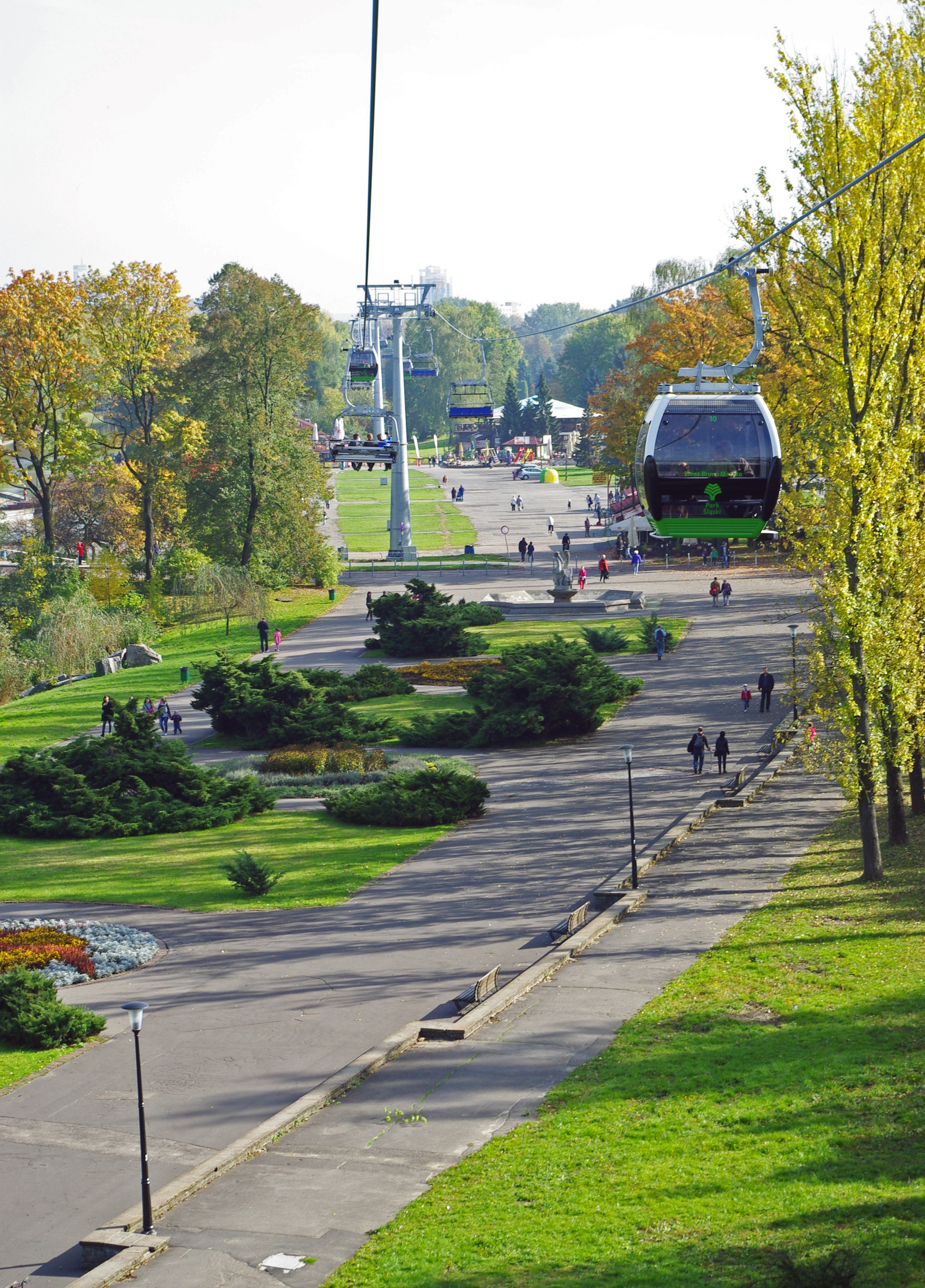
Elka cableway in Poland

- Elka cableway (pol. Kolej linowa "Elka") in Silesian Park in Chorzów - Tourist lift
- Krynica-Zdrój – Jaworzyna Krynicka – Ski gondola
- Solina – Tourist lift over Lake Solina
- Szczyrk – Hala Skrzyczeńska – Ski gondola
- Świeradów-Zdrój – Stóg Izerski – Ski gondola
- Wrocław – Polinka – Public transport
- Zakopane - Kasprowy Wierch - Aerial tramway

=== Portugal ===
- Guimarães – Guimarães Cable Car
- Lisbon – Telecabine Lisboa – Tourist lift
- Lisbon – Lisbon Zoo – Cable car
- Madeira – Funchal Cable Car
- Vila Nova de Gaia – Gaia Cable Car

=== Romania ===
- Constanţa – Mamaia – Summer seaside gondola.
- Piatra Neamţ – Tourist/ski gondola.
- Poiana Braşov – Ski gondola.
- Azuga – Ski gondola.
- Sinaia – Tourist/Ski gondola.(2 cable cars 1000-1400, 1400-2000)
- Vulcan, Hunedoara – Ski gondola.
- Straja, Hunedoara – Ski gondola
- Campulung Moldovesnesc, Suceava – Ski Gondola.
- Transalpina ski resort – Ski Gondola.(2 ropeways connected via a middle station, due to problems regarding the power grid usually the second ropeway doesn't work)

=== Russia ===
- Nizhny Novgorod – Nizhny Novgorod Cable Car, intercity gondola lift.
- Moscow – Moskva River Cable Car.

=== Serbia ===
- Stara Planina – Jabučko ravnište
- Zlatibor – Zlatibor Gold Gondola (longest in the world at 9 km)
- Tornik – Pribojska Banja (future longest in the world at 14.7 km)
- Kopaonik – Brzeće – Mali Karaman

=== Slovenia ===
- Kanin Cable Car in Bovec is the longest gondola lift in Slovenia. It takes skiers from the Bovec valley (436 m) to the central part of the ski slopes (2,200 m).
- Vogel Cable Car in Bohinj
- Velika Planina Cable Car in Kamniška Bistrica valley (supposedly longest unsupported cable car in Europe)

=== Spain ===
- Baqueira-Beret – Ski lift
- Barcelona – Montjuïc Cable Car
- Formigal – Ski lift, dismantled in 2004.
- La Pinilla – Ski lift
- Panticosa-Los Lagos – Ski lift.
- Sierra Nevada – Ski lift.
- Teleférico de Benalmádena – Tourist lift on the Costa Del Sol
- Telecabina de la Coma del Clot – Pulsed gondola lift at Vall de Núria, Catalonia.
- Teleférico de Madrid in Madrid, Community of Madrid. From Parque del Oeste to Casa de Campo.
- Vall de Núria telecabina – six-person cars in two sets of four each.

=== Sweden ===
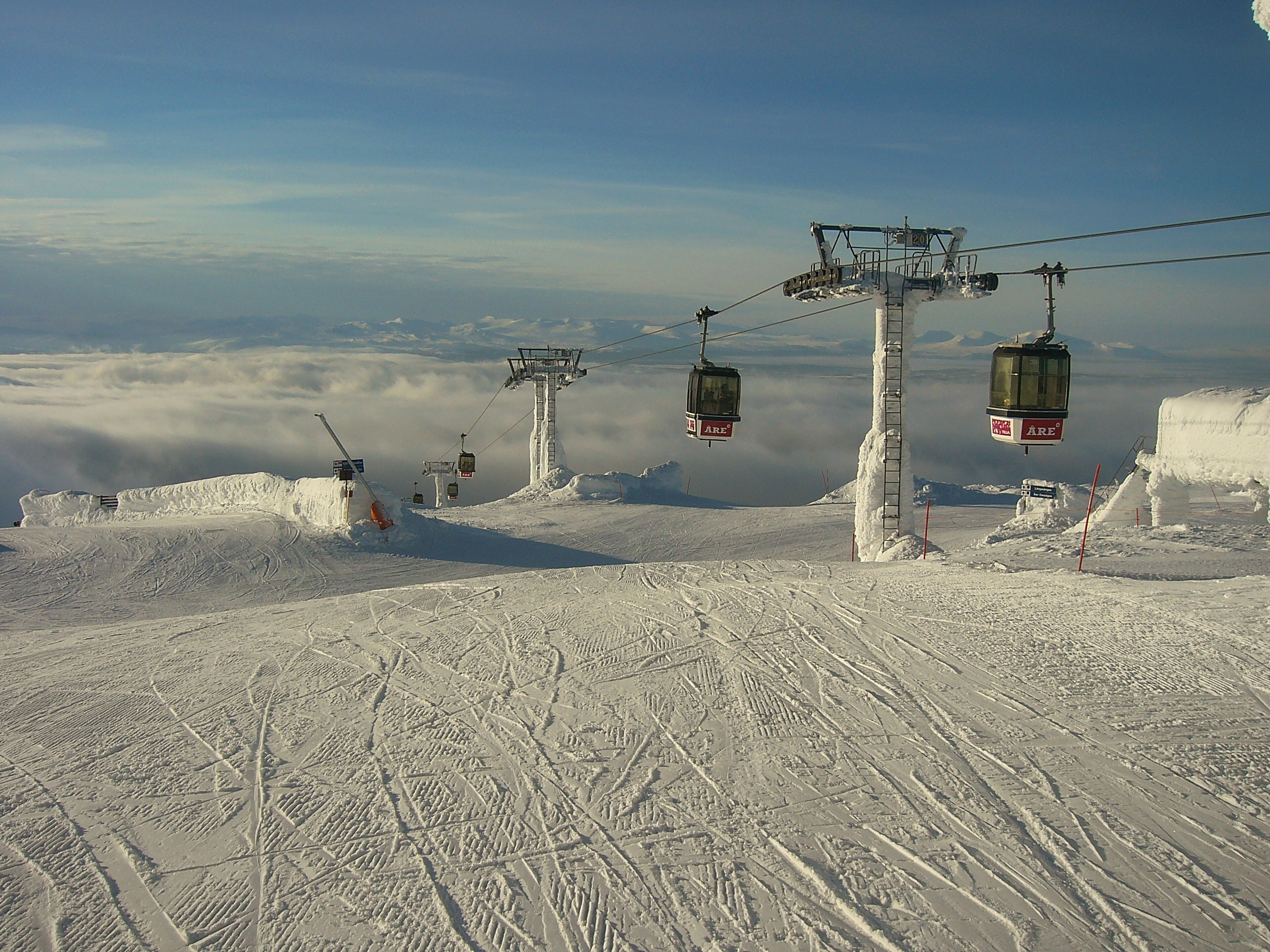
Gondola in Åre

- Branäs – Ski lift.
- Åre – Olympiagondolen – Ski lift.
- Kläppen – Ski lift.

=== Switzerland ===
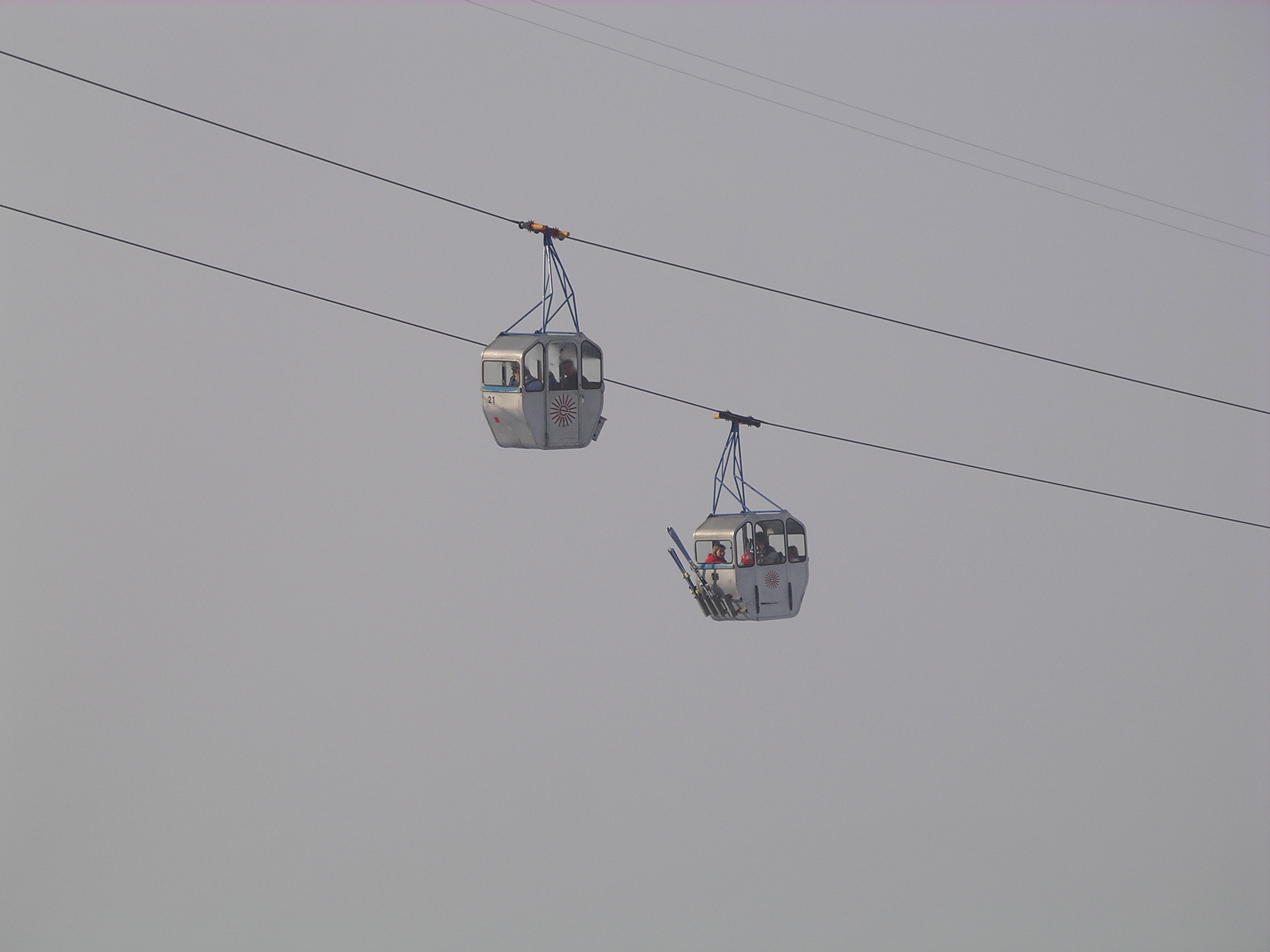
Classic gondola lift in Emmetten, Switzerland

More than 40 Swiss ski resorts have gondola lifts for eight or more passengers, with more than 100 individual lifts in operation. Notable lifts include:

- Gondelbahn Grindelwald-Männlichen is a 6071m tram with a journey time of 30 minutes.
- Seilbahnen Beatenberg-Niederhorn, from Beatenberg to the summit of the Niederhorn

=== Turkey ===
Location of aerial lifts in Turkey

Listed in the order of opening year. List includes gondola lifts in European and Asian parts of the country.

- Balçova Gondola, İzmir (1974)
- Maçka Gondola, Istanbul line TF1 (1993)
- Eyüp Gondola, Istanbul line TF2 (2005)
- Samsun Amisos Hill Gondola, Samsun (2006)
- Keçiören Gondola, Ankara (2008)
- Aydın Pınarbaşı-Aytepe Gondola, Aydın (2009)
- Erciyes Lifos Gondola, Kayseri Province (2010s)
- Erciyes Tekir Gondola, Kayseri Province (2010s)
- Bergama Acropolis Gondola, İzmir Province (2010)
- Palandöken Gondola, Erzurum Province (2011)
- Şahinbey Park Gondola, Gaziantep (2011)
- Ordu Boztepe Gondola, Ordu (2012)
- Bursa Uludağ Gondola, Bursa Province (2013)
- Yenimahalle-Şentepe Gondola, Ankara (2014)
- Denizli Gondola, Denizli (2015)
- Tünektepe Gondola, Antalya (2017)
- Alanya Gondola, Alanya (2017)
- Babadağ Gondola, Muğla Province (2021)
- Sapanca Gondola, Sakarya Province (2023)
- Kartepe Gondola, Kocaeli Province (2024)

=== United Kingdom ===
- Alton Towers Theme Park, Staffordshire
- London Cable Car, crossing the Thames at Greenwich, London
- Llandudno Cable Car, connecting the Great Orme to Llandudno in Wales
- Heights of Abraham Cable Car, Matlock Bath, Derbyshire,
- Nevis Range Ski Area, Fort William, Scotland

== North America ==
=== Canada ===
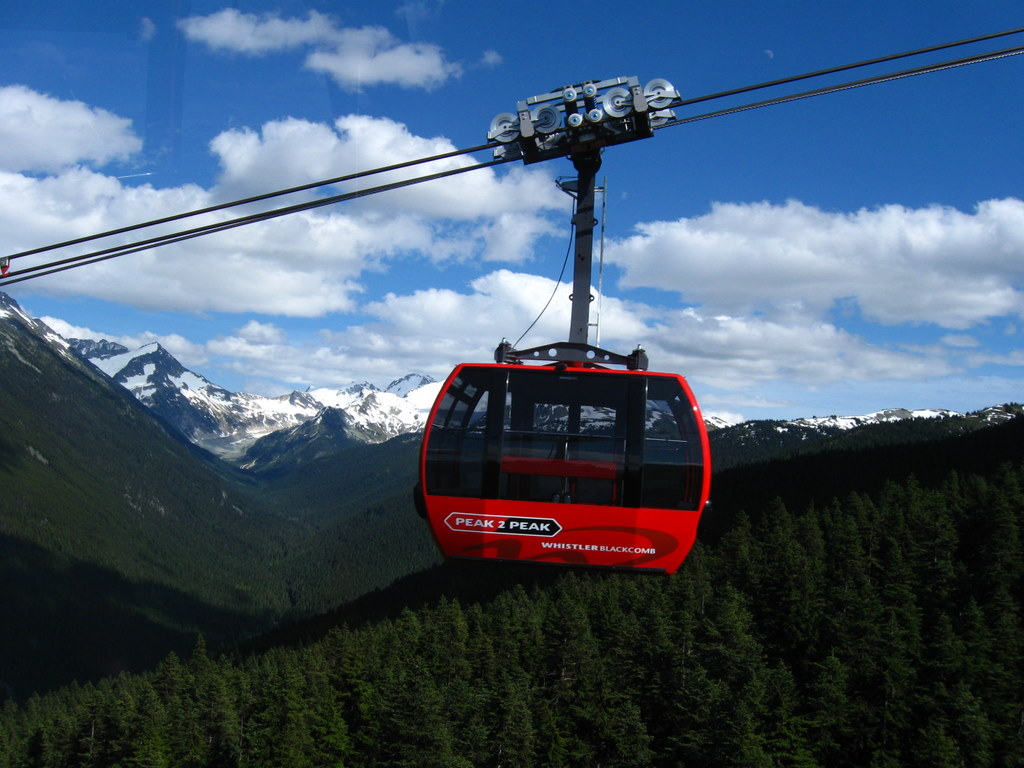
Peak 2 Peak Gondola at Whistler Blackcomb

Alberta:

- Grizzly Express Gondola at Lake Louise Ski Area, Alberta (6 Person Gondola)
- Sulphur Mountain Gondola in Banff, Alberta (4 Person Bi-Cable Gondola)
- Sunshine Village Gondola near Banff, Alberta (8 Person, Triple Stage Gondola)

British Columbia:

- Sea to Sky Gondola at Squamish, British Columbia
- Lara's Gondola at Big White Ski Resort near Kelowna, British Columbia (8 Person Gondola)
- Whistler Village Express Gondola at Whistler Blackcomb, British Columbia (9 Person [8 sitting, one standing], Double Stage Gondola)
- Blackcomb Gondola at Whistler Blackcomb, British Columbia (10 Person, Double Stage Gondola)
- Excalibur Gondola at Whistler Blackcomb, British Columbia (8 Person, Double Stage Gondola)
- Creekside Gondola at Whistler Blackcomb, British Columbia (6 Person Gondola)
- Peak 2 Peak Gondola at Whistler Blackcomb, British Columbia (28 Person Tri-Cable Gondola)
- Kadenwood Gondola at Whistler Blackcomb, British Columbia (8 Person Pulse Gondola)
- Golden Eagle Express Gondola at Kicking Horse Resort, British Columbia (8 Person Gondola)
- Village Gondola at Panorama Ski Resort, British Columbia (8 Person Open-Air Pulse Gondola)
- Revelation Gondola at Revelstoke Mountain Resort near Revelstoke, British Columbia (8 Person, Double Stage Gondola)
- Burnaby Mountain Gondola in Burnaby, British Columbia (future)

Ontario:

- Village Gondola at Blue Mountain, Ontario (6 Person Open-Air Gondola) Summer Only. In the winter it is converted to a High Speed Six Person Chairlift.

Québec:

- Télécabine Express at Mont Tremblant Resort, Québec (8 Person Gondola)
- Cabriolet at Mont Tremblant Resort, Québec (6 Person Open-Air Gondola)
- Casino Express at Mont Tremblant Resort, Québec (8 Person Gondola)
- L'Étoile Filante at Mont Sainte-Anne, Québec (8 Person Gondola)
- L'Express du Village at Ski Bromont, Québec (6 Person Chairlift/ 8 Person Gondola Combination)
- L'Hybride at Mount Orford in Magog, Québec (6 Person Chairlift/ 8 Person Gondola Combination)
- Massif Express at Le Massif, Québec (8 Person, Double Stage Gondola)
- Le Téléphérique at Montmorency Falls, Québec (30 Person Standing Gondola)

Nova Scotia:

- Atlantic Gondola at Ski Cape Smokey, Nova Scotia (8 Person Gondola)

=== Costa Rica ===
A pulsed gondola provides access to a canopy walkway and other attractions in the Monteverde Cloud Forest Reserve.

=== Dominican Republic ===
- Teleférico de Santo Domingo, a public transport system cable car in Santo Domingo.
- Teleférico de Puerto Plata, a tourist cable car in Puerto Plata.

=== Guatemala ===
- Teleférico de Amatitlán in Amatitlán

=== Mexico ===
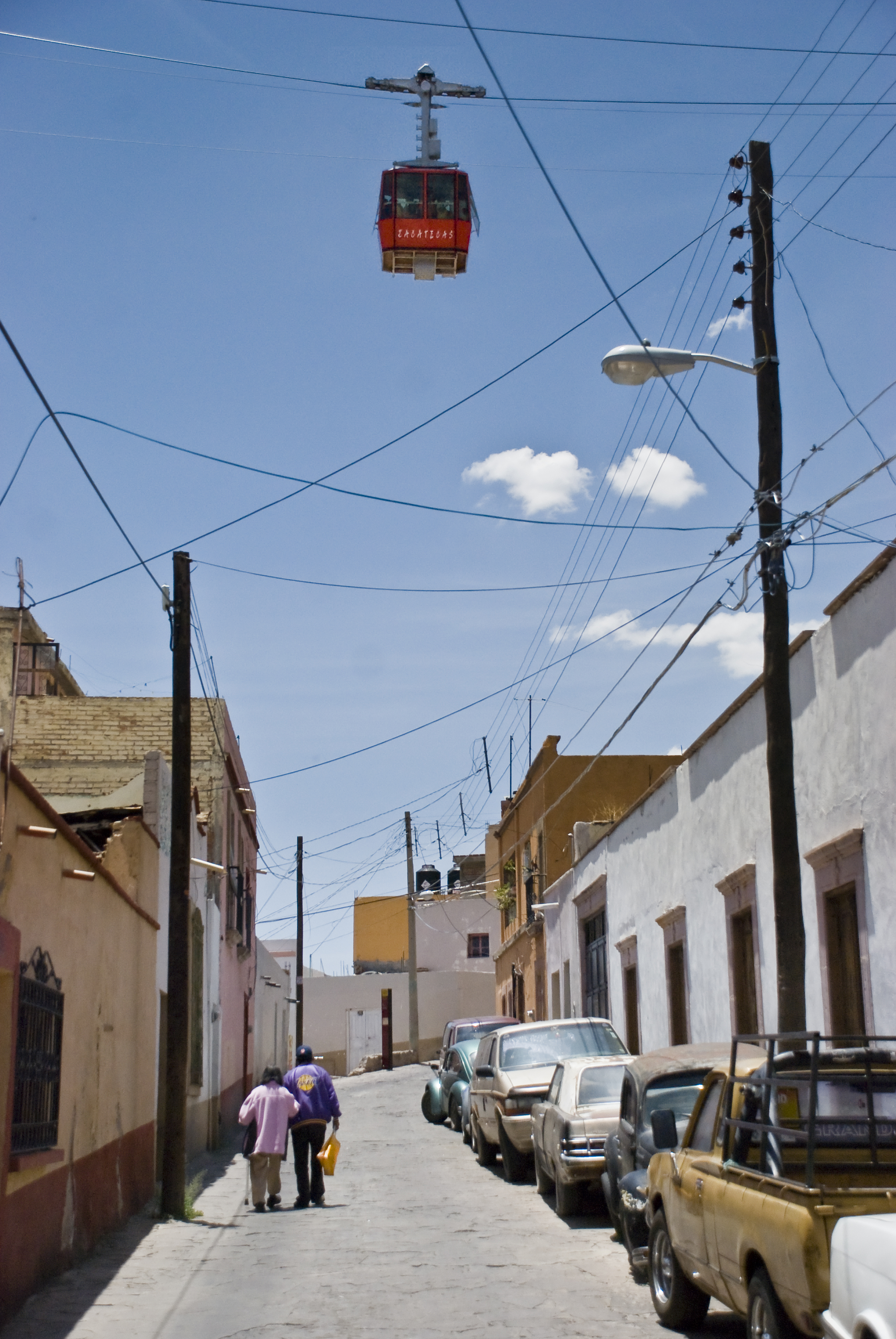
Teleférico de Zacatecas

- Cablebús, a public transport system cable car in Mexico City.
- Mexicable, a public transport system cable car in the State of Mexico.
- Teleférico de Durango, Victoria de Durango, Durango.
- Teleférico de las Barrancas del Cobre in Divisadero, Chihuahua.
- Teleférico de las Grutas de García in García, Nuevo León.
- Teleférico de Orizaba in Orizaba, Veracruz.
- Teleférico de Puebla in Puebla, Puebla.
- Teleférico de Zacatecas, a tourist cable car in the city of Zacatecas, renovated and opened in 2018.
- Teleférico de Uruapan, a public transport system cable car in Uruapan.

=== United States ===
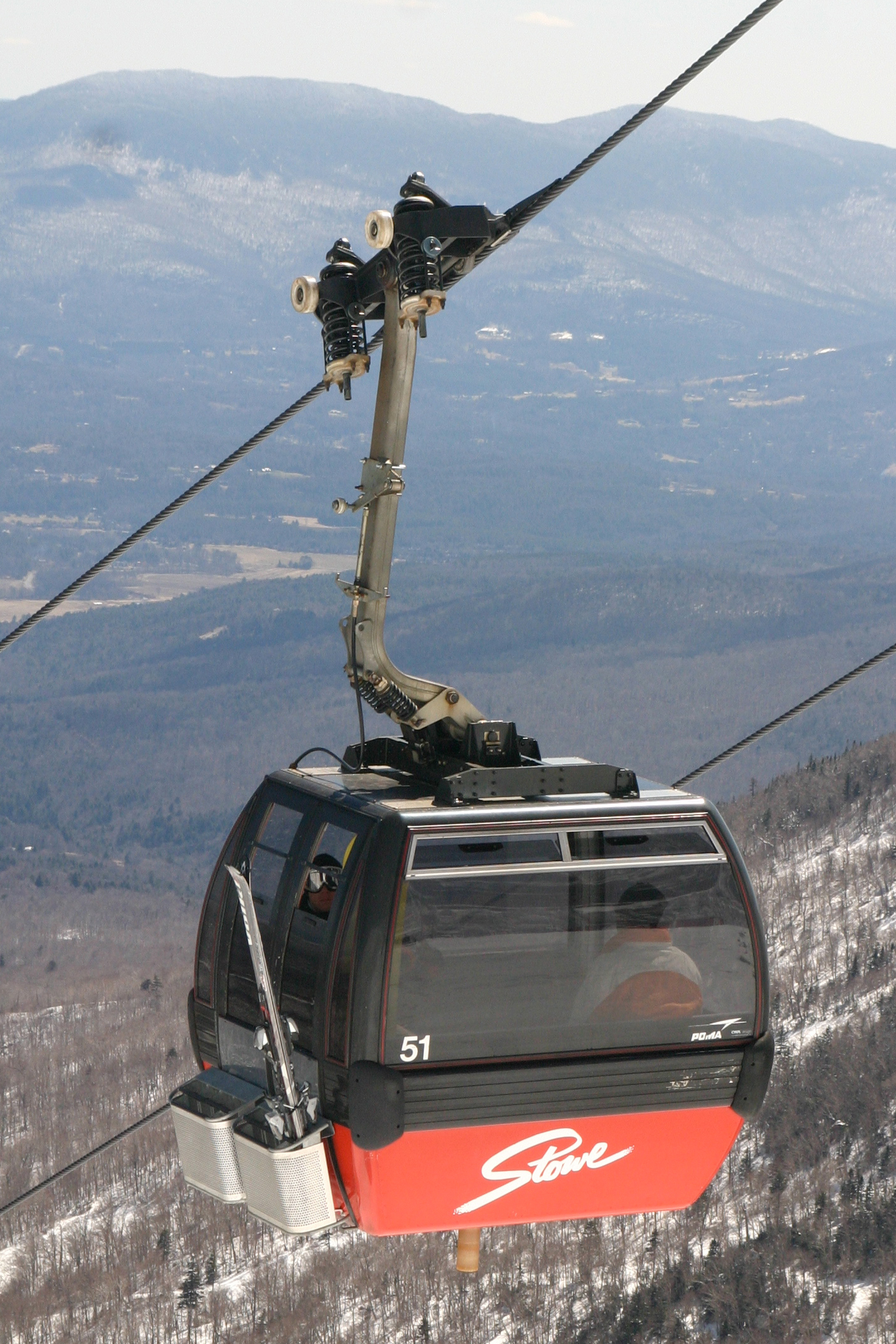
8 person capacity gondola car. Stowe, Vermont

==== Ski resort gondolas ====
Arizona:

- Arizona Snowbowl
  - Arizona Gondola

California:

- Heavenly
  - Heavenly Gondola
- Mammoth Mountain
  - Panorama Gondola
  - Village Gondola
- Northstar California
  - Big Springs Gondola
  - Highlands Gondola (Pulse Gondola)
- Sugar Bowl
  - Village Gondola
- Palisades Tahoe
  - Base to Base Gondola

Colorado:

- Aspen
  - Silver Queen Gondola
- Beaver Creek
  - Haymeadow Express Gondola
  - Riverfront Express Gondola
- Breckenridge
  - BreckConnect Gondola
- Cañon City
  - Royal Gorge Aerial Gondola
- Keystone
  - River Run Gondola
  - Outpost Gondola
- Snowmass
  - Elk Camp
  - Sky Cab (Pulse Gondola, Cabriolet)
- Steamboat
  - Silver Bullet Gondola (first 8-passenger gondola in the world)
  - Wild Blue Gondola
- Telluride
  - Mountain Village Gondola
- Vail
  - Eagle Bahn Gondola
  - Gondola One
- Winter Park
  - The Gondola
  - Village Cabriolet (Cabriolet)

Idaho:

- Silver Mountain
  - Gondola
- Sun Valley – Bald Mountain
  - Roundhouse Gondola

Minnesota:

- Lutsen Mountains
  - Gondola

Montana:

- Yellowstone Club
  - Eglise Gondola

New Hampshire:

- Bretton Woods
  - Bretton Woods Skyway
- Loon Mountain
  - Gondola

New Jersey:

- Mountain Creek
  - The Cabriolet (Cabriolet)

New Mexico:

- Ski Apache
  - The Apache Windrider (only ski access Gondola in NM)
- Taos
  - Gondolita (Pulse Gondola)

New York:

- Belleayre
  - Catskill Thunder
- Gore Mountain
  - Northwoods Gondola
- Whiteface
  - Cloudsplitter Gondola

Utah:

- Deer Valley
  - Jordanelle Express Gondola
- Park City
  - Cabriolet Gondola (Cabriolet)
  - Frostwood Gondola (Pulse Gondola)
  - Quicksilver Gondola
  - Red Pine Gondola
- Snowbasin
  - Needles Express Gondola
  - Strawberry Express Gondola

Vermont:

- Killington
  - K-1 Express Gondola
  - Skyeship Express Gondola
- Stowe
  - Gondola
  - Over Easy Gondola
- Stratton
  - Summit Gondola

Washington:

- Crystal Mountain
  - Mount Rainier Gondola

Wyoming:

- Jackson Hole
  - Bridger Gondola
  - Sweetwater Gondola

==== Other gondolas ====
California

- Bayside Skyride, SeaWorld San Diego, San Diego
- Skyfari, San Diego Zoo, San Diego
- Delta Flyer/Eagle's Flight, California's Great America, Santa Clara
- Los Angeles Aerial Rapid Transit, Los Angeles, proposed
- Skytrail (pulse gondola), Trees of Mystery, Klamath
- Skyway, Disneyland, Anaheim (first in U.S.; closed in 1994)
- California Trail Gondola, Oakland Zoo
- Sterling Vineyards, Calistoga
- Palm Springs Arial Tram

Colorado

- Glenwood Caverns Adventure Park Gondola, Glenwood Springs
- Fun House Express (pulse gondola), Water World, Colorado, Federal Heights
- Royal Gorge Gondola, Royal Gorge Bridge, Cañon City

Florida

- Bud Light Seltzer Skyview, Hard Rock Stadium, Miami Gardens
- Disney Skyliner, Walt Disney World, Orlando
- Skyride, Busch Gardens Tampa Bay, Tampa

Indiana

- Skyline, Indianapolis Zoo, Indianapolis

Louisiana

- Mississippi Aerial River Transit (dismantled in 1994), New Orleans

Minnesota

- Skyride, Minnesota State Fair, Falcon Heights

New Hampshire

- Wildcat Gondola Skyride, Wildcat Mountain Ski Area, Jackson (this gondola is converted to a quad chair-lift for skiing in the winter)

New Jersey

- Skyway, Six Flags Great Adventure, Jackson

New York

- Skyfari, Bronx Zoo, New York City (removed in 2008)

Oregon

- Wallowa Lake Tramway, Wallowa–Whitman National Forest, Joseph
- Portland Aerial Tram

Texas

- Texas Skyway, Fair Park, Dallas

Washington

- Skyride, Riverfront Park, Spokane

West Virginia

- Pipestem Resort State Park, Pipestem

== Oceania ==
=== Australia ===
- Arthurs Seat, Victoria. The Eagle opened on 3 December 2016. Made by Doppelmayr.
- Taronga Park Zoo, Sydney
- Skyrail Rainforest Cableway, Cairns
- Horse Hill Lift, Mount Buller, Victoria ^{†}
- Kosciusko Express lift, Thredbo, New South Wales ^{†}
- Merritts Gondola, Thredbo, New South Wales

^{†} Note: Horse Hill and Kosciusko Express are combined lifts (or 'chondolas') where gondolas and four seat detachable chairs can be added to a cable according to demand.

A complete list of all 400 Australian aerial and ski lifts. It includes a dozen gondolas.

=== New Zealand ===
- Skyline Gondola, Queenstown
- Skyline Gondola, Mt Ngongotaha, Rotorua
- Christchurch Gondola, Heathcote Valley, Port Hills
- Skywaka Gondola, Whakapapa ski field, Mt Ruapehu
- All lifts at the list of New Zealand ski lifts

== South America ==
=== Argentina ===
- "Telecabina" (Chapelco Ski resort)
- Aerogondolas (Skyride), Parque de la Ciudad Theme Park, Buenos Aires, Argentina
- "Telecabina Amancay", Cerro Catedral Ski Resort, San Carlos de Bariloche
- "Telecabina Jean Pierre", Cerro Bayo Ski Resort, Villa La Angostura
- "Teleférico San Bernardo", Salta, Argentina

=== Bolivia ===
- Mi Teleférico (La Paz). First three lines opened in 2014, six more lines are being planned. At 10 km (6.2 mi) in length, Phase One (the first three lines) was considered to be the longest aerial cable car system in the world upon its completion in 2014. The Phase Two expansion would extend the system by some 20 km (12 mi).

=== Brazil ===
- Teleférico do Alemão, a cable car servicing the Complexo do Alemão favela in Rio de Janeiro. Has not operated since 2016.
- Teleférico da Providência, a cable car servicing the Providência neighbourhood in Rio de Janeiro.
- "Bondinho Parque Unipraias", a tourist cable car in Balneário Camboriú, Santa Catarina.
- "Bondinhos Aéreos Parque da Serra", a tourist cable car in Canela, Rio Grande do Sul.
- "Bontur Bondinhos Aéreos", a tourist cable car in Aparecida, São Paulo.
- "Teleférico do Morro do Elefante", a tourist cable car in Campos do Jordão, São Paulo (combined installation with gondolas and six-person chairlifts).

=== Chile ===
- Santiago Cable Car. In Santiago, a tramway was open on April 1, 1980, in San Cristóbal Hill. With 72 cabins moving at 4 meters per second, its biggest tower is 124.6 ft (38 m) tall, and the smallest 26.2 ft (8 m). The Teleférico de Santiago has 12 towers and takes almost 20 minutes to cover the 3 miles (4860 m) route, powered by a 100 hp engine.

=== Colombia ===
- In the Colombian National Coffee Park in Montenegro, department of Quindío, there is a tourist tramway hovering over the park.
- Chicamocha National Park cable car in Chicamocha Canyon.
- Manizales Gondola Lift functions as an urban public transit system serving the steep areas of Manizales.
- Megacable (Pereira), is an urban public transit system serving the steep areas of Pereira, and is interconnected with the bus rapid transit network "Megabús".
- Metrocable is a gondola lift system implementing an urban public transit system serving the steep areas of Medellín. It connects the hilly neighborhoods of the northeast and northwest sections of the city with the metropolitan train system, Metro de Medellín, an elevated subway system.
- MIO Cable is a gondola lift in Cali, opened on 17 September 2015, and is interconnected with the metropolitan transportation system (Masivo Integrado de Occidente – MIO).
- In the Santísimo Hill Park in Floridablanca, Santander, there is a tourist gondola lift.
- In the Sanctuary of Las Lajas in Ipiales, Nariño, there is a tourist gondola lift.
- TransMiCable is a gondola lift in Bogotá, opened on 27 December 2018.

=== Ecuador ===
- Aerovía (Guayaquil) in Guayaquil. Gondola lift.
- TelefériQo in Quito. Gondola lift.

=== Peru ===
- Teleférico de Kuelap (Kuelap) in Chachapoyas. Gondola lift.

=== Venezuela ===
- Metrocable is an urban public transit system in Caracas.
- Teleférico de Caracas ascends El Ávila Mountain within El Ávila National Park, in Caracas

== See also ==
- List of aerial tramways
- List of spans
- List of funicular railways
- Funitel
