= Uludağ (disambiguation) =

Uludağ is a mountain in Turkey. Uludağ may also refer to:

== People ==
- Alper Uludağ (born 1990), Turkish footballer
- Sevgül Uludağ (1958-2026), Turkish Cypriot journalist

== Other uses ==
- Uludağ Gazoz, soft drink
- Bursa Uludağ University, university in Turkey
- Bursa Uludağ Gondola, airlift line in Turkey
