= Balçova Gondola =

- Balçova Teleferiği
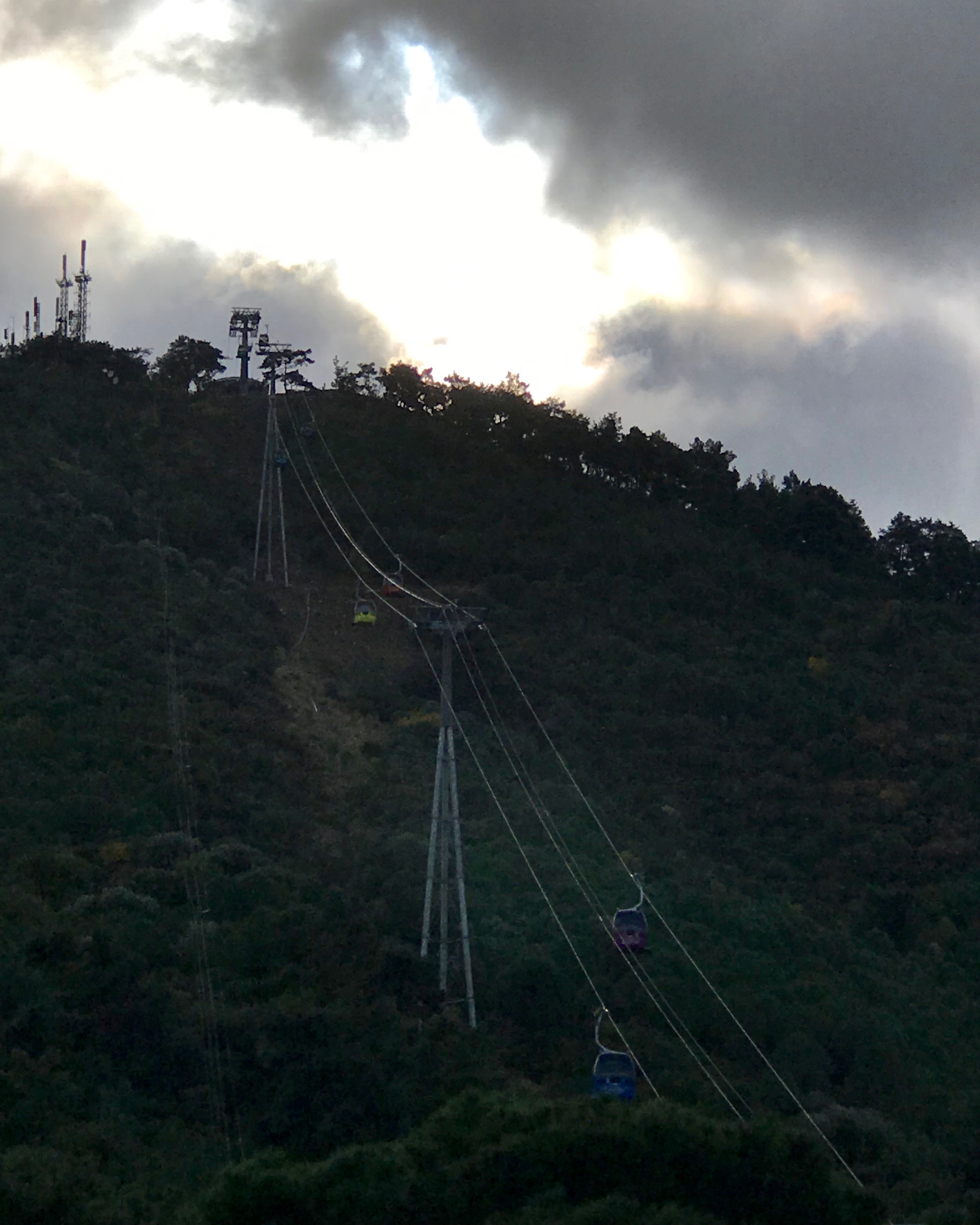

- Location within Turkey

Overview
- Status: Operational
- Character: Recreational
- Location: İzmir
- Country: Turkey
- Coordinates: 38°23′13.8″N 27°2′39.9″E
- No. of stations: 2
- Construction cost: 695,000 mark
- Construction begin: 1972
- Open: March 24, 1974; 52 years ago

Operation
- Owner: İzmir Metropolitan Municipality
- Operator: İZULAŞ
- No. of carriers: 20
- Carrier capacity: 8
- Ridership: 1,200 hourly
- Trip duration: 2 min 42 sec

Technical features
- Aerial lift type: Bi-cable gondola detachable
- Line length: 810.71 m (2,659.8 ft)
- No. of support towers: 8
- Cable diameter: 45 mm (1.8 in)
- Operating speed: max. 5 m/s (16 ft/s)

The Balçova Gondola (Turkish: Balçova Teleferiği) is a two-station aerial lift line of gondola type in İzmir, Turkey. Situated in the district of Balçova, it operates between Yeşiloğlu Hill and the summit of Dede Mountain. It is the second oldest aerial lift in the country, after the Bursa Uludağ Aerial Tramway.

Balçova Gondola was first constructed between 1972-1973 by a Germany-based company and began operating on 24 March 1974. The construction cost was 695,000 mark. In 2008, following a report by the İzmir Branch of Chamber of Mechanical Engineers, the line was closed down due to security reasons. The construction of the 810.71 m (2,659.8 ft) long current line began in April 2013 and completed in 2015 with a cost of ₺15.5 million. The gondola line is owned by the İzmir Metropolitan Municipality.

== Features ==
- Length: 810.71 m (2,659.8 ft)
- Height difference: 351.66 m (1,153.7 ft)
- Speed: max. 5 m/s
- Ridership: 1,200 hourly
- Number of cabins: 20
- Cabin capacity: 8
- Cable diameter: 45 mm

== See also ==
- List of gondola lifts in Turkey
