= Bergama Acropolis Gondola =

Aerial lift in Izmir Province, Turkey

- Bergama Akropol Teleferik
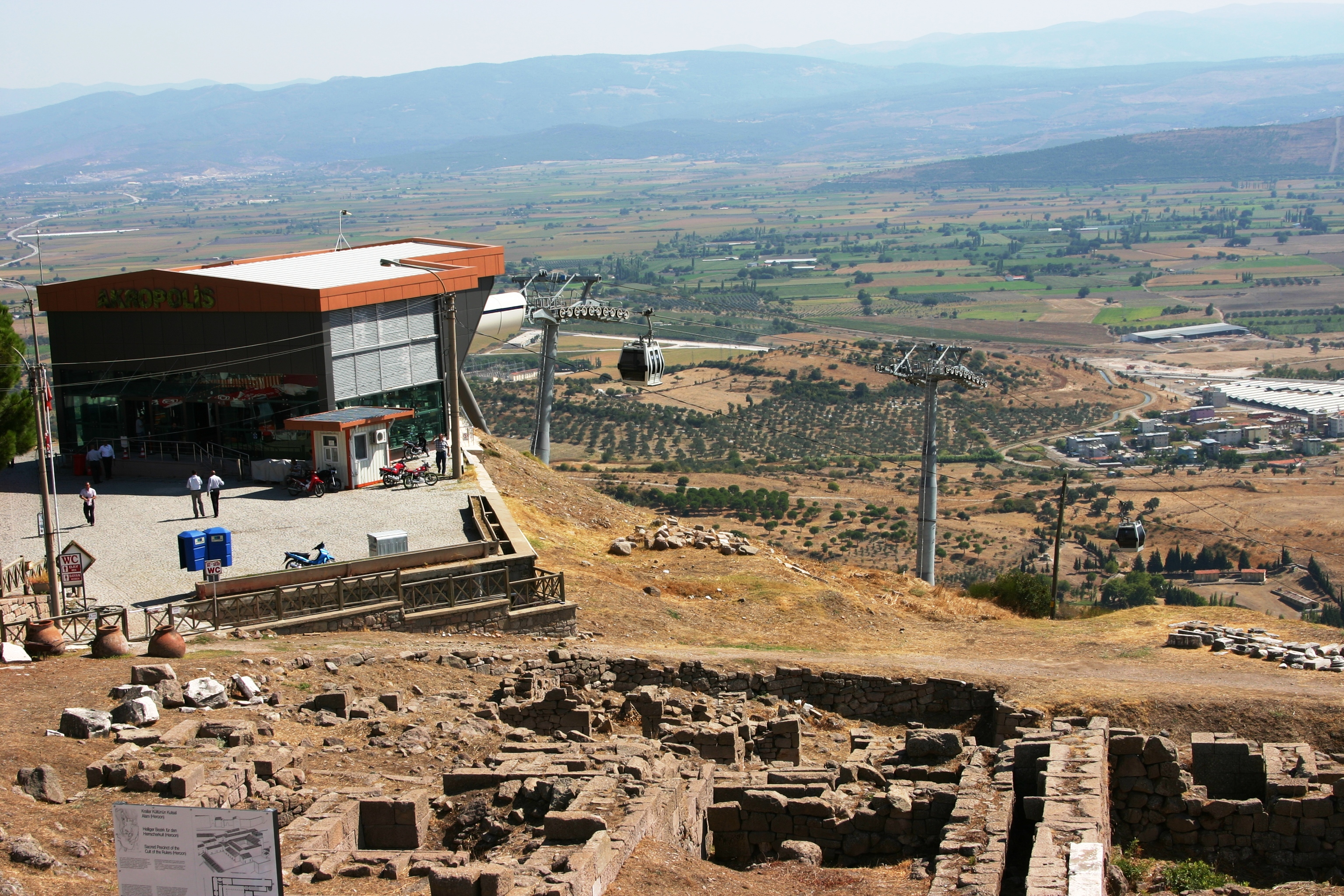
- Acropolis station of Bergama Acropolis Gondola.

- Location within Turkey

Overview
- Status: Operational
- Character: Recreational
- Location: Bergama, İzmir Province
- Country: Turkey
- Coordinates: 39°07′31″N 27°11′21″E
- Termini: Bergama (southeast); Acropolis (northwest)
- Elevation: lowest: 90 m (300 ft) highest: 330 m (1,080 ft)
- No. of stations: 2
- Open: October 14, 2010; 15 years ago

Operation
- Owner: Bergama Municipality
- Operator: Akropolis Teleferik Inc.
- No. of carriers: 15
- Carrier capacity: 8
- Ridership: 209,441 (2012)
- Trip duration: 4 min.
- Fare: ₺8.00

Technical features
- Aerial lift type: Bi-cable gondola detachable
- Manufactured by: Leitner Ropeways, Italy
- Line length: 700 m (2,300 ft)
- No. of support towers: 2

The Bergama Acropolis Gondola (Turkish: Bergama Akropol Teleferik) is a two-station aerial lift of gondola type at Bergama district of İzmir Province in western Turkey serving the nearby archaeological site of Acropolis. The 700 m (2,300 ft) long line is operated by Akropolis Teleferik Inc.

Bergama is the site of ancient Pergamon, a major tourist attraction place. A project was worked out in 2005 to connect the site Asclepium down in the valley with the 3 km (1.9 mi) far Acropolis on the top of a steep hill north of Bergama by an aerial lift line. After rejection of this project by the responsible official body due to concerns over the conservation of the historical place, an alternate project for a much shorter route between Acropolis and its foothill north of the town found acceptance in 2006. Access to Acropolis on the narrow road by bus takes considerable time for the tourists, and any widening of the existing road is not permitted due to the archaeological status of the site.

The gondola lift was constructed by the Italian company Leitner Ropeways of Leitner Group costing €6 million, and financed by the local Turkish company Akropolis Teleferik Inc. on the build–operate–transfer base for a lease term of 49 years.

The gondola lift line is 700 m (2,300 ft) long with two supporting towers between the terminals. It started to operate mid May 2010, with the official opening taking place on October 14, 2010. The number of cabins each eight-seater was increased from initially nine to fifteen in 2013. The gondola lift transported with nine cabins hourly up to 1,200 people between the base station at 90 m (300 ft) above sea level and the 330 m (1,080 ft) high end station. The ride takes less than four minutes. The fare decreased from ₺10.00 to ₺8.00 with effect of October 2013.

The development of the number passengers in relation with the number of visitors at the site is shown in the table below:

Year	Pergamon Visitors	Gondola Passengers
2010	260,010	30,388 ^{†})
2011	283,528	232,411
2012	266,065	209,441

^{†}) in 2,5 months only.

== Specifications ==
- Line length: 700 m (2,300 ft)
- Height difference: 90–330 m (300–1,080 ft)
- Number of stations: 2
- Number of cabins: 15 each eight-seater
- Trip duration: 4 minutes
- Hourly ridership: 1,200
- Fare: ₺8.00
- Terminals:
  - Bergama 39°07′31″N 27°11′21″E
  - Acropolis 39°07′52″N 27°11′10″E

== See also ==
- List of gondola lifts in Turkey
