= Denizli Gondola =

- Denizli Teleferik
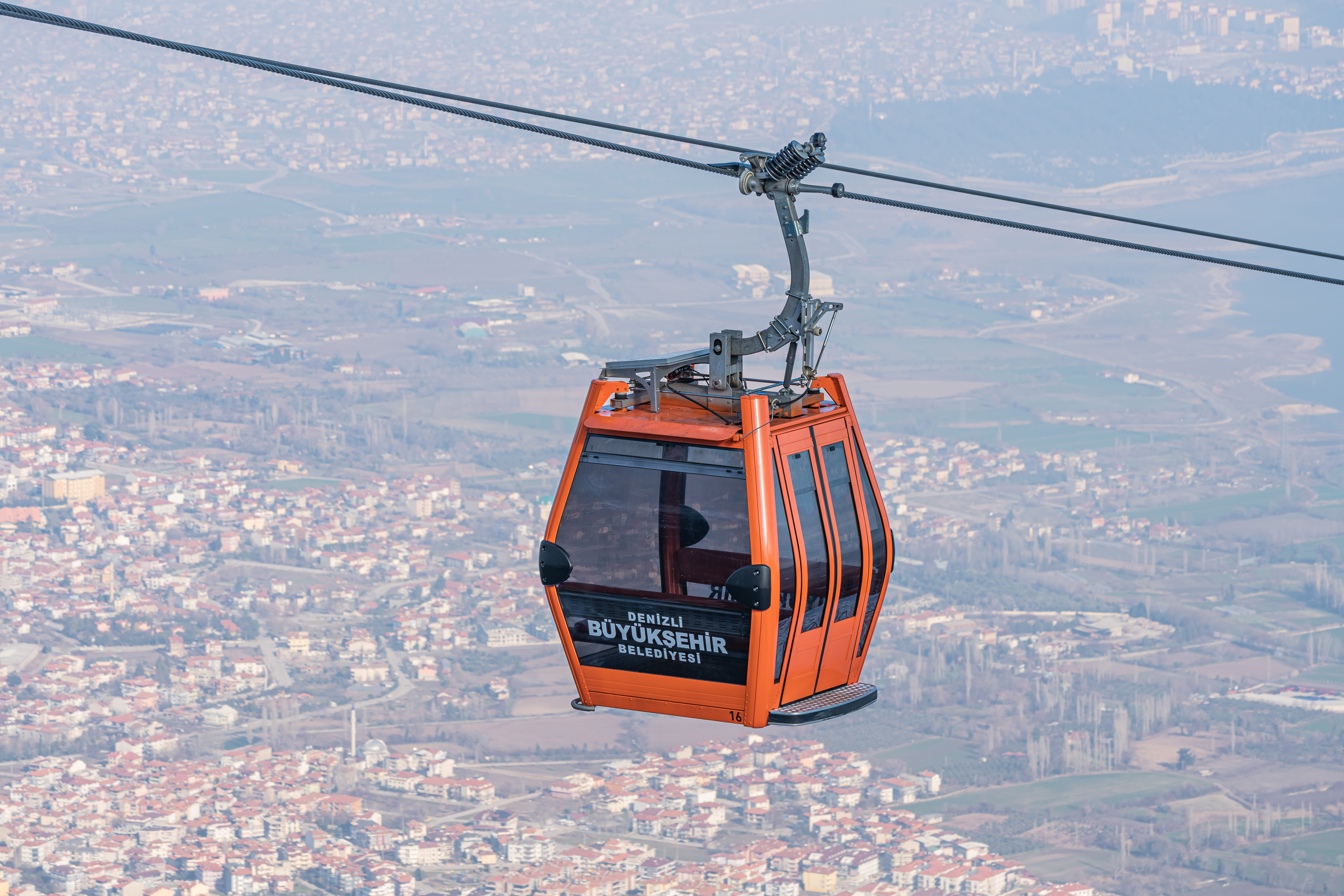
- Denizli Gondola

- Location within Turkey

Overview
- Status: Operational
- Character: Recreational
- Location: Denizli
- Country: Turkey
- Coordinates: 37°43′15″N 29°08′23″E
- Termini: Lower station Upper station
- Elevation: lowest: 300 m (980 ft) highest: 1,400 m (4,600 ft)
- No. of stations: 2
- Construction cost: ₺38 million (approx. US$13 million)
- Open: 17 October 2015; 10 years ago
- Website: denizliteleferik.com.tr

Operation
- Owner: Denizli Metropolitan Municipality
- Operator: Denizli Metropolitan Municipality
- No. of carriers: 24
- Carrier capacity: 8
- Ridership: 800 hourly
- Operating times: 10:00 - 19:00 (weekdays); 10:00 - 20:00 (weekend)
- Headway: 30 sec.
- Trip duration: 7 min.
- Fare: ₺20.00

Technical features
- Aerial lift type: Bi-cable gondola detachable
- Line length: 1,500 m (4,900 ft)
- No. of support towers: 9

The Denizli Gondola (Turkish: Denizli Teleferik) is a two-station aerial lift line of gondola type in Denizli, Turkey. It is owned and operated by Denizli Metropolitan Municipality. It operates between Denizli and Bağbaşı Hill.

It was opened on 17 October 2015, with a ceremony attended by Nihat Zeybekci, then-Minister of the Economy and former Mayor of Denizli, and Yalçın Topçu, then-Minister of Culture and Tourism. The construction cost was 38 million TRY (approximately 13 million USD). It is the longest cable car line of the Aegean Region with a length of 1,500 metres (4,900 ft).

Bağbaşı Hill, the upper station, has bungalow cabins to rent overnight, tents to stay in, play areas, activity park built in the forest trees with climbing and rope obstacles, shop huts, cafés and restaurants. The round-trip ticket for the ride costs ₺20.00.

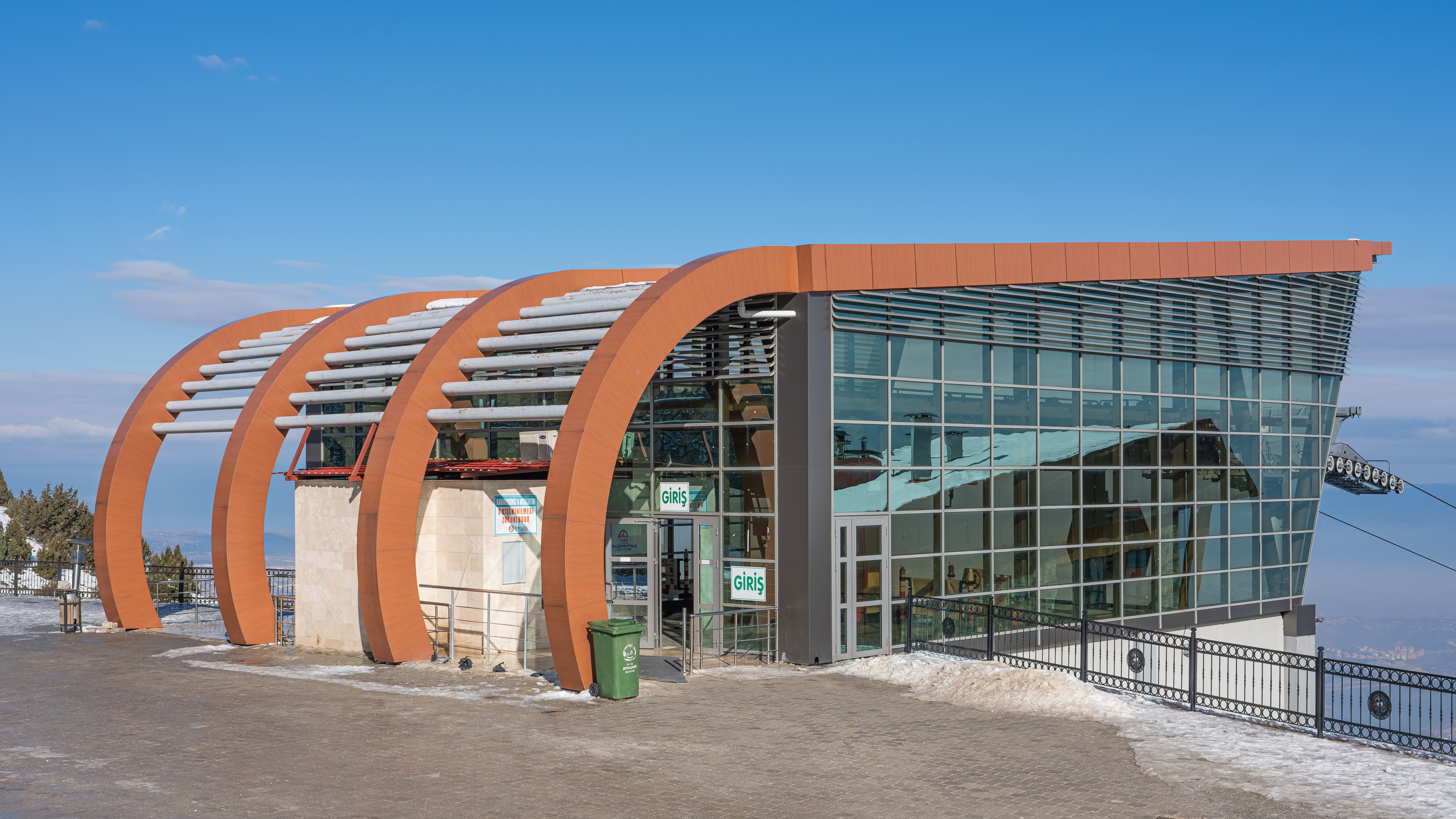
Upper station

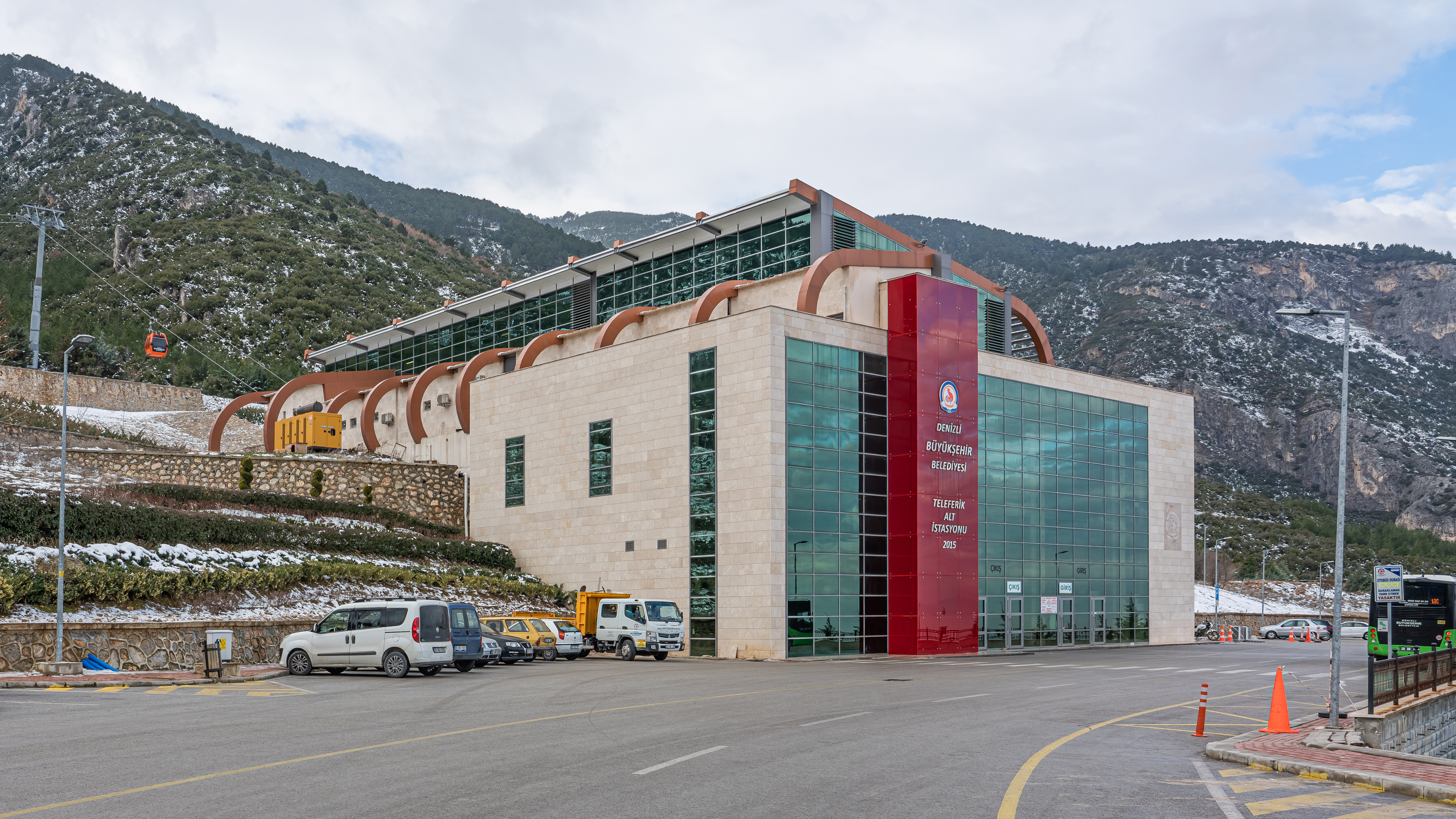
Lower station

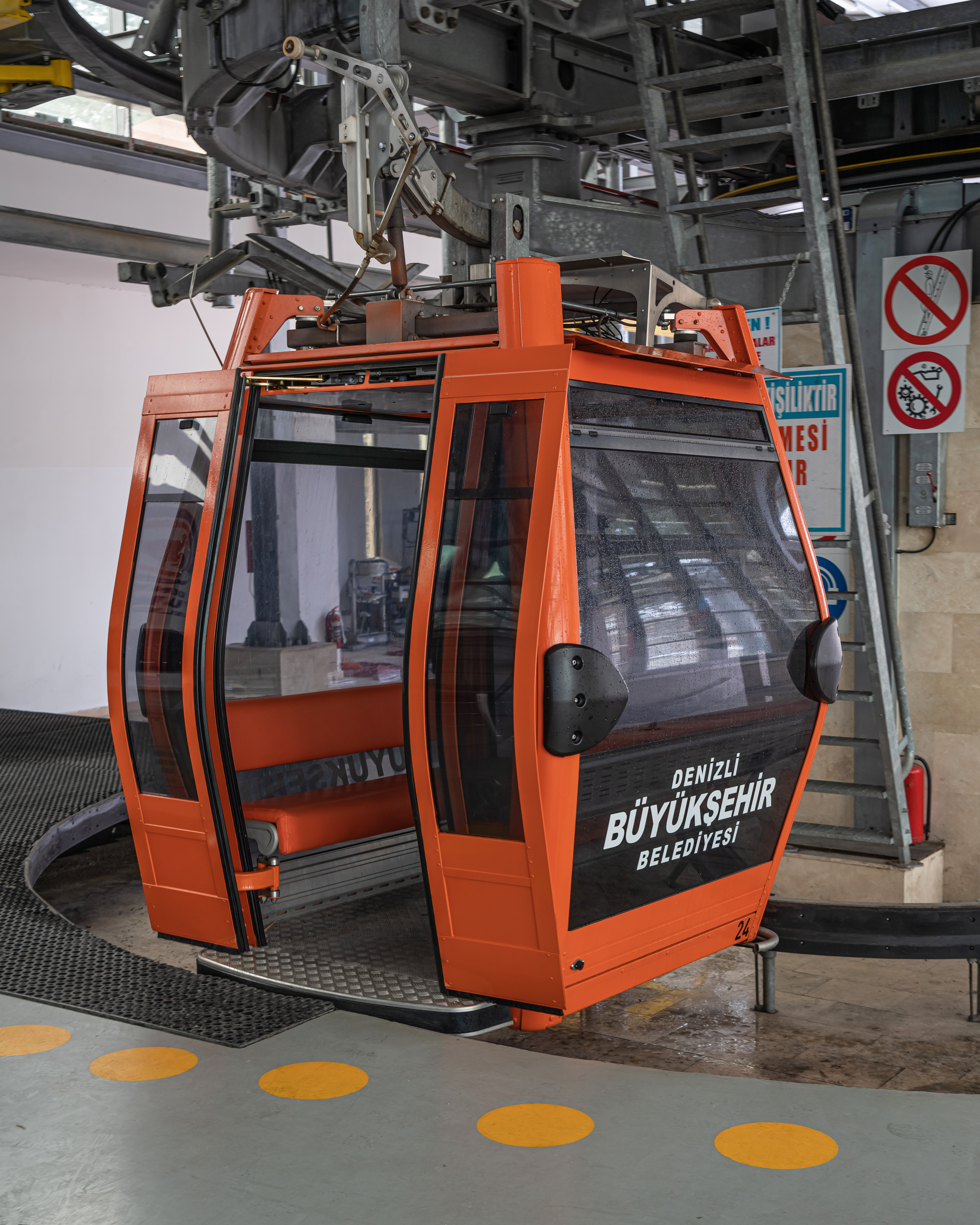
Gondola

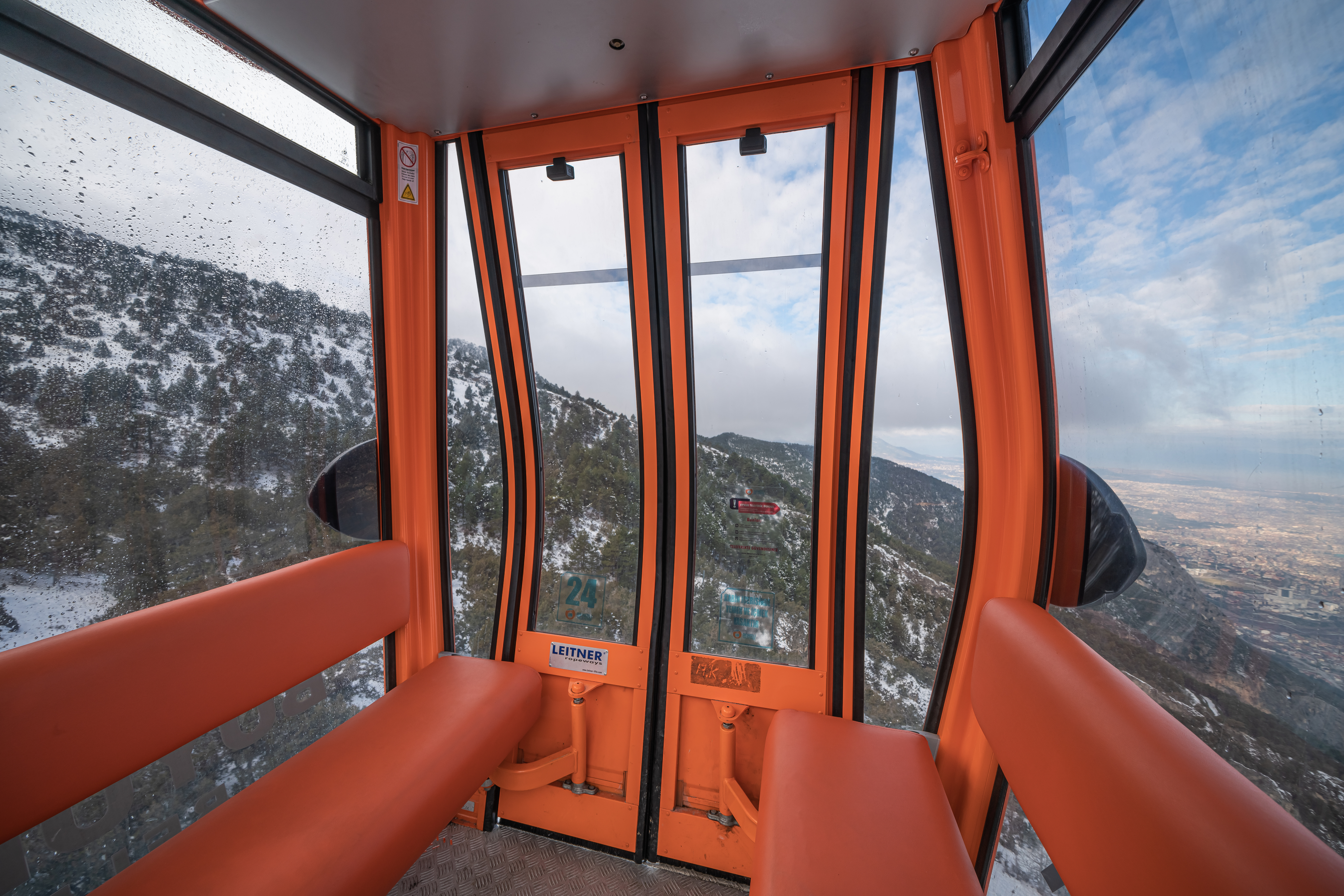
Interior of a gondola

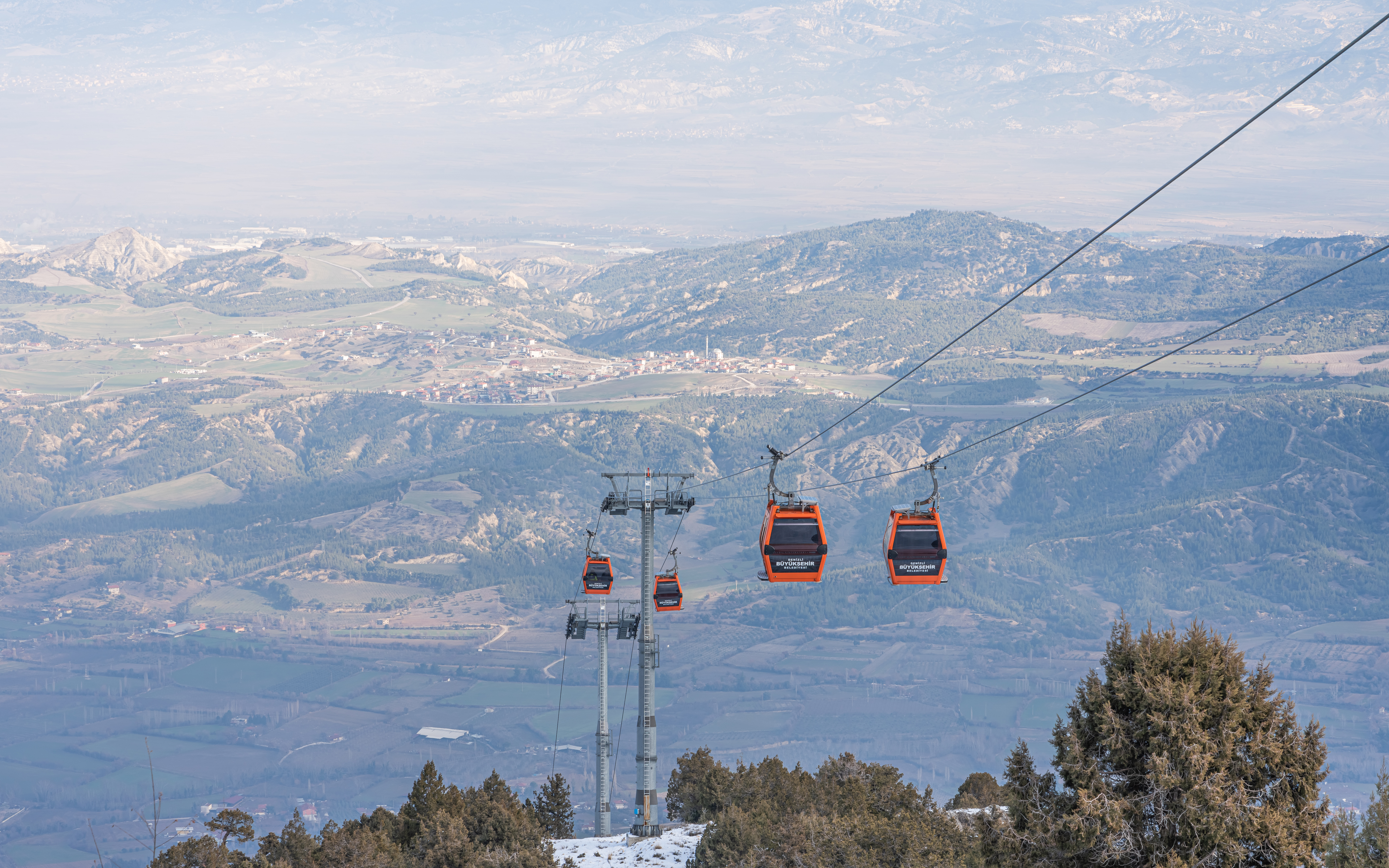
View from the upper station

== See also ==
- List of gondola lifts in Turkey
