= MIO Cable =

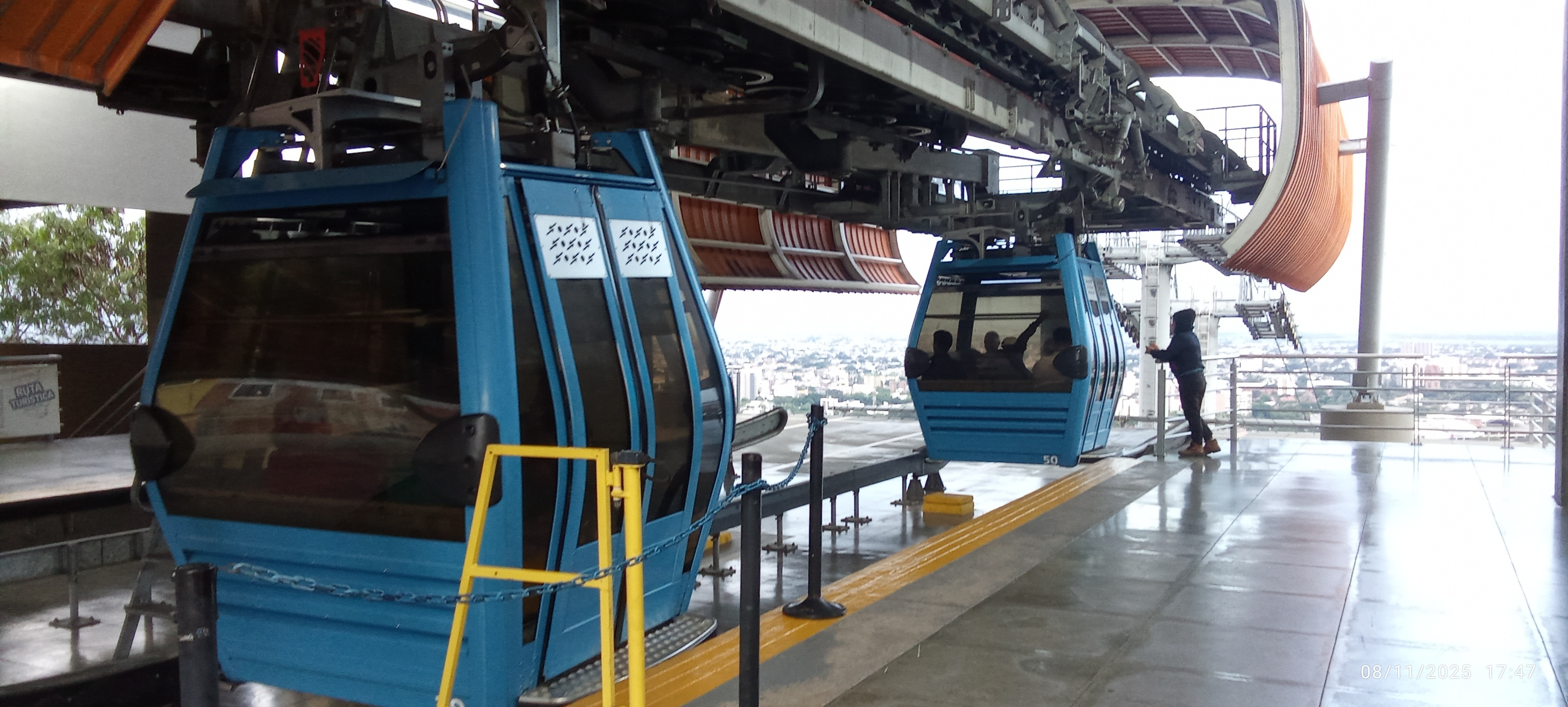

Overview
- Status: Operational
- Character: Urban
- System: Masivo Integrado de Occidente
- Location: Cali, Colombia
- Termini: Terminal Cañaveralejo; Brisas de Mayo
- Open: September 2015; 10 years ago

Operation
- Ridership: 1.5 million (2025)

Technical features
- Line length: 2.1 km (1.3 mi)
- Operating speed: 5 metres per second (16 ft/s)

MIO Cable is a gondola lift line implemented in the city of Cali, Colombia, with the purpose of providing urban public transport complementary to the service of the Masivo Integrado de Occidente (MIO) bus rapid transit. It has a length of 2.1 km and was opened in September 2015.

== Network ==
The network has only one operating line, which follows an east–west direction, connecting the Terminal Cañaveralejo MIO station with the Siloé neighbourhood in Brisas de Mayo station.

== See also ==
Media related to MIO Cable at Wikimedia Commons

- List of gondola lifts
