= TMII Skylift =

- Kereta Gantung TMII
- Tourists take a ride on the skylift TMII Skylift picture in a joint stamp

Overview
- Status: Operational
- Character: Recreational
- System: Monocable detachable gondola lift
- Location: Jakarta, Indonesia
- Termini: Station A Station C
- No. of stations: 3
- Open: 20 April 1973; 53 years ago
- Website: TMII - Jelajah Cerita Indonesia

Operation
- Owner: Astra International
- Operator: PT Skylift Indonesia, subsidiary of Astra International
- Carrier capacity: 81 cabins, maximum of ## adult passengers per cabin
- Operating times: Monday to Friday 09:00hrs - 16:00hrs Saturday to Sunday 09:00hrs - 17:00hrs
- Fare: IDR50,000 (Weekdays); IDR60,000 (Weekend)

The TMII Skylift (Kereta Gantung TMII) is a gondola lift on Taman Mini Indonesia Indah them park in Indonesia. It is the first aerial ropeway system ever operated in the state. The system had been being operated by PT Skylift Indonesia–subsidiary of Astra International–on its pre-operation since 9 April 1973. It was opened to the public at 20 April 1973, together with the theme park inauguration by the second president of Indonesia, Suharto.

== Stations ==
Terminal (Station) A, one of the skylift stations.

The TMII Skylift consist of three stations:

- Station A, located near Keong Mas IMAX Theatre, Sasana Kriya, and Kong Miao Confucian Temple
- Station B, located near Istana Anak-Anak Indonesia, and Science Center
- Station C, located near the parking building, Indonesia Museum, and Panggung Candi Bentar
