= Masivo Integrado de Occidente =

Bus system in Santiago de Cali, Colombia

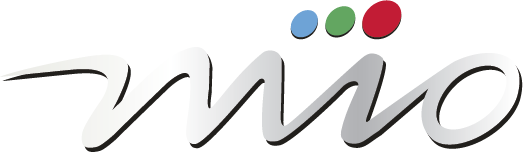

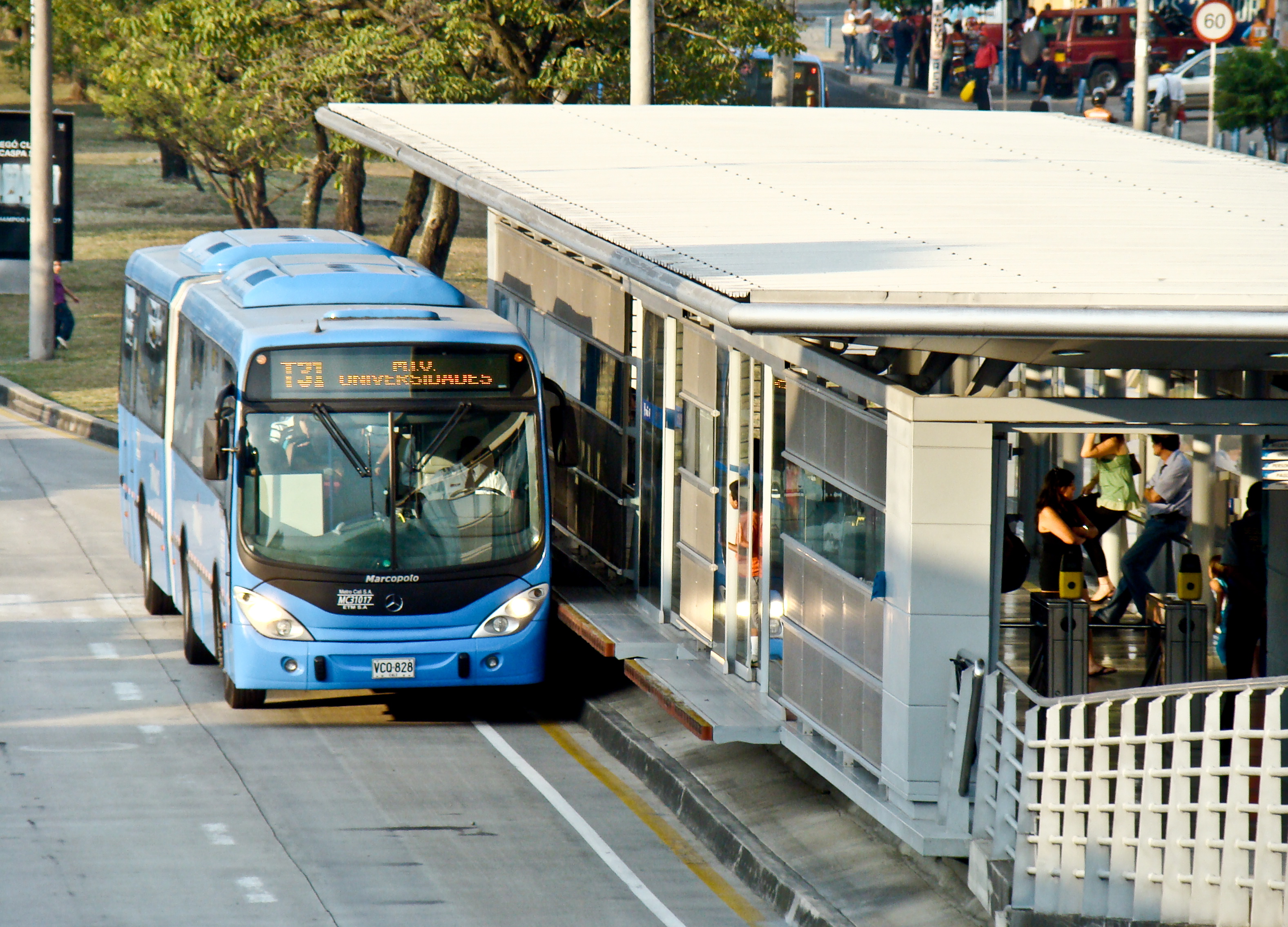

Overview
- Locale: Santiago de Cali, Colombia
- Transit type: Bus rapid transit
- Number of lines: 9
- Number of stations: 77
- Annual ridership: 89.3 million (2025)
- Website: MIO; Metrocali

Operation
- Began operation: March 1, 2009
- Operator: Metro Cali S.A.

Technical
- System length: 243 km (151 mi)

The Masivo Integrado de Occidente ('Western Mass Integrated'), also referred to as MIO, is a bus rapid transit system that serves Santiago de Cali, Colombia. The system is operated through articulated buses which move in dedicated lanes. Approximately 97% of the city's spatial perimeter will be covered by this system, involving nearly 243 kilometers. The MIO will cover approximately 72% of Cali's public transportation needs.

The project was set in motion by an investment of US$405 million; with 70% contributed by the Colombian government and the remaining 30% by the municipality of Cali. These resources are destined to finance MIO's infrastructure: construction of trunks, fueling stations, rest stops, the system of stations, pedestrian bridges, terminals, and yards.

The articulated buses have a capacity of 160 passengers and circulate exclusively on the trunks; in turn, the register type buses will transport between 80 and 100 people and they will travel through tramways and special diversions. The regular operation of the system is roughly from 5:00am to 11:00pm on weekdays and Saturdays, and from 6:00am to 10:00pm on Sundays and holidays.

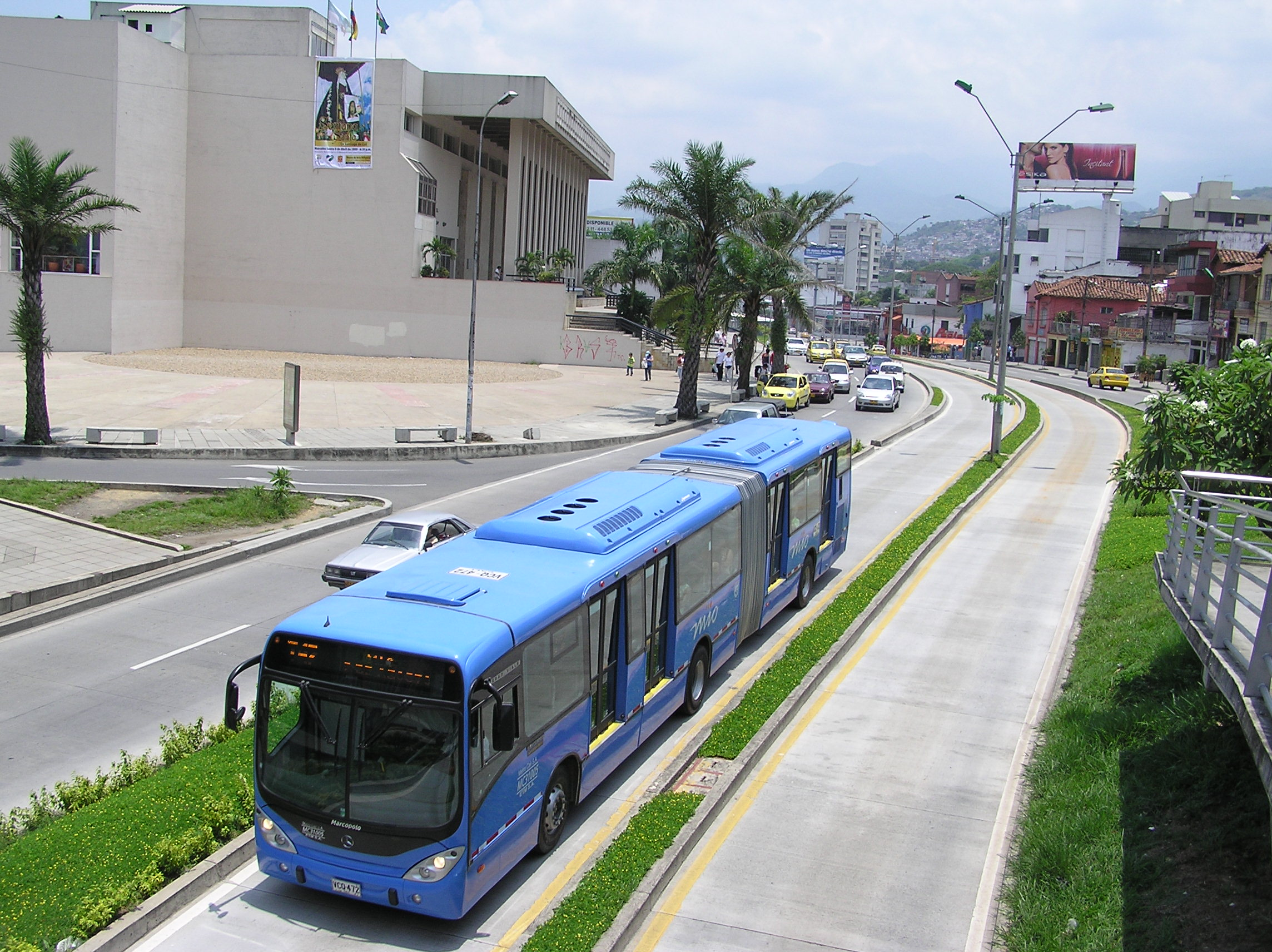
Masivo Integrado de Occidente(MIO)

== Routes and stations ==
=== Zoning ===
For better efficiency in the division of the system's routes, the Metrocali company developed a city zoning model following the example of the TransMilenio system. However, Metrocali did not assign letters to the trunk lines, but rather divided the entire city into different zones, giving each one a number, which are the following:

Zone	Name
0	Centro
1	Universidades
2	Menga
3	Paso del Comercio
4	Sanín
5	Nuevo Latir
6	Simon Bolivar
7	Cañaveralejo
8	Calipso

=== Stations ===
The MIO has several Trunk corridors which have stop stations where users can transfer from one route to another to reach their destination. The stations are listed from North to South and are classified in their corresponding zones.

==== Menga Zone ====
- Terminal Menga (Av 3n Cl 70)
- Estación Álamos (Av 3 Cl 52)
- Estación Vipasa (Av 3 Cl 44)
- Estación Prados del Norte (Av 3 Cl 38)
- Estación Las Américas (Av 3n Cl 23an)
- Estación Versalles (Av 3n Cl 21)

==== Paso del Comercio Zone ====
- Terminal Paso del Comercio (Cr 1 Cl 71)
- Estación Chiminangos (Cr 1 Cl 62)
- Estación Flora Industrial (Cr 1 Cl 56)
- Estación Salomia (Cr 1 Cl 47)
- Estación Popular (Cr 1 Cl 44)
- Estación Manzanares (Cr 1 Cl 39)
- Estación Fátima (Cr 1 Cl 30)
- Estación Río Cali (Cr 4n Cl 23)
- Estación Piloto (Cr 1 Cl 24)
- Estación San Nicolás (Cr 1 Cl 21)

==== Centro Zone ====
List of West-East way, South-North way and then North-South way.

- Estación San Bosco (Cr 15 Cl 9)
- Estación San Pascual (Cr 15 Cl 13 - Cl 15)
- Estación Sucre (Cl 15 Cr 15)
- Estación Petecuy (Cl 15 Cr 8)
- Estación San Pedro (Cl 15 Cr 4)
- Estación La Ermita (Cl 13 Cr 4)
- Estación Plaza de Caicedo (Cl 13 Cr 4)
- Estación Centro (Cl 13 Cr 8)
- Estación Santa Rosa (Cl 13 Cr 10)
- Estación Fray Damián (Cl 13 Cr 15)

==== Sanín Zone ====
- Estación Belalcázar (Cr 15 Cl 21)
- Estación Floresta (Cr 15 Cl 30)
- Estación Atanasio Girardot (Cr 15 Cl 34)
- Estación Chapinero (Cr 15 Cl 44)
- Estación Villacolombia (Cr 15 Cl 52)
- Estación El Trébol (Cr 15 Cl 58)
- Estación 7 de Agosto (Dg 15 Cl 71a)
- Terminal Andrés Sanín (Cl 75 Cr 19)

==== Calipso Zone ====
- Estación Cien Palos (Cr 17 Cl 18)
- Estación Primitivo (Tv 25 Dg 18)
- Estación Santa Mónica (Tv 25 Cl 28)
- Estación Villanueva (Tv 25 Cl 32)
- Estación Conquistadores (Tv 29 Cl 44)
- Terminal Calipso (Cl 36 Cr 28d)

==== Nuevo Latir Zone ====
- Estación Troncal Unida (Cr 28d Cl 72l)
- Estación Amanecer (Cr 28d Cl 72u)
- Estación Nuevo Latir (Cr 28d Cl 83)
- Terminal Aguablanca (under construction)

==== Cañaveralejo Zone ====
- Estación Santa Librada (Cl 5 Cr 22)
- Estación Manzana del Saber (Cl 5 Cr 27)
- Estación Estadio (Cl 5 Cr 34)
- Estación Tequendama (Cl 5 Cr 39)
- Estación Lido (Cl 5 Cr 44)
- Estación Unidad Deportiva (Cl 5 Cr 52)
- Terminal Cañaveralejo (Cl 5 Cr 52)
- MIO Cable
- Estación Plaza de Toros (Cl 5 Cr 52)
- Estación Pampalinda (Cl 5 Cr 62)
- Estación Refugio (Cl 5 Cr 66)
- Estación Caldas (Cl 5 Cr 70)
- Estación Capri (Cl 5 Cr 78)

==== Simón Bolívar Zone ====
- Terminal Simón Bolívar (Cl 25 Cr 61-69)

==== Universidades Zone ====
- Estación Meléndez (Cl 5 Cr 94)
- Estación Buitrera (Cr 100 Cl 11a)
- Estación Univalle (Cr 100 Cl 13)
- Estación Universidades (Cr 100 Cl 16)

== Fares ==
The standard fare was raised to $3,200 Colombian pesos, about US$0.78 on January 16th 2025.
