= Bursa Uludağ Gondola =

Aerial lift in Bursa Province, Turkey

- Bursa Teleferik
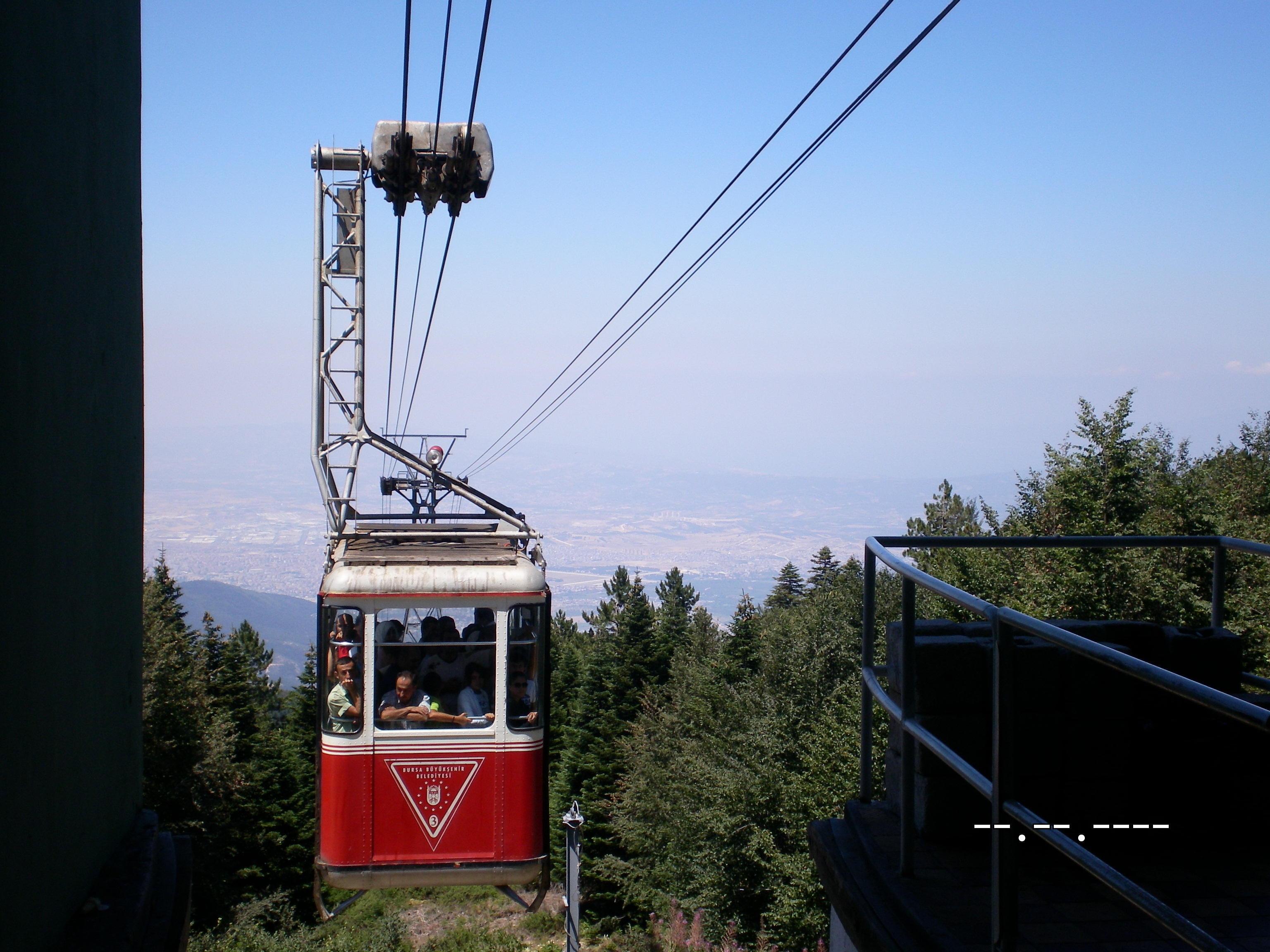
- Bursa Uludağ Aerial Tramway (November 2012). Replaced in 2013 by gondola lift.

- Location within Turkey

Overview
- Status: Finished
- Character: Ski resort, recreational
- Location: Yıldırım, Bursa Province, Turkey
- Country: Turkey
- Coordinates: 40°10′18″N 29°04′59″E
- Termini: Teferrüç, Yıldırım, Bursa (northwest); Oteller, Uludağ (southeast)
- Elevation: lowest: 395 m (1,296 ft) highest: 1,870 m (6,140 ft)
- No. of stations: 4
- Services: Uludağ
- Built by: Bursa Teleferik Co.
- Open: 29 October 1963; 62 years ago
- Last extension: End November 2013
- Closed: 29 October 2013; 12 years ago
- Reopened: End November 2013

Operation
- Owner: Bursa Metropolitan Municipality
- Operator: Leitner Turkey Inc.
- No. of carriers: 174
- Carrier capacity: 8
- Trip duration: 22 min.

Technical features
- Aerial lift type: Mono-cable gondola detachable
- Manufactured by: Leitner Ropeways, Italy
- Line length: 8.8 km (5.5 mi)
- No. of support towers: 45

The Bursa Uludağ Gondola (Turkish: Bursa Teleferik Hattı), or simply Teleferik as called locally, is an aerial lift line in Bursa Province connecting the city of Bursa with the nearby ski resort area and national park at Mt. Uludağ. Initially, as an aerial tramway line, it went in service in 1963, and served for fifty years until it was replaced by a modern system of gondola lift and extended into a ski resort area. The installation of a new line became unavoidable due to increased demand by tourists.

== History ==
The initial line was an aerial tramway built by the Swiss company Von Roll Holding to enable easy access to the country's biggest ski resort area on Uludağ. Construction work began in 1958 and the line opened on 29 October 1963, the 40th anniversary Republic Day.

The base station is situated at Teferrüç neighborhood of Yıldırım district in southern Bursa. The 4.5 km (2.8 mi) long line served two stations at Uludağ, Kadıyayla and Sarıalan Yaylası. Two 20-seater cabins transported hourly 120 passengers. The service of aerial tramway ceased on 29 October 2013, after fifty years, to make way for a modern and higher capacity aerial lift system.

== New aerial lift ==
The new aerial lift line was designed, and all the technical equipment was delivered by the Italian company Leitner Ropeways on a build–operate–transfer financing base for a lease period of 30 years. The stations were designed by Yamaç Korfalı from Bursa, who had worked with the architect Zaha Hadid in London. The transportation of material and the support towers to the difficult accessible areas in the national park was done by an aerial crane of Heliswiss. The construction works were carried out by Bursa Teleferik Company.

The new line is 8.8 km (5.5 mi) long using the existing line of 4.5 km (2.8 mi), and extending it to the area of Oteller as the end station, where hotels are situated. In the past, the hotels and the ski areas could be reached only by taxi or bus after arriving at the end station in Sarıalan Yaylası. There are a total of 45 support towers between the end stations. 174 eight-seater gondola-type carriers are capable of transporting 1,500 passengers hourly between Teferrüç Station at 395 m (1,296 ft) and the end station Oteller at an altitude of 1,870 m (6,140 ft). There are also VIP cabins with four seats. The capacity of the new line is more than 10-times of the old one. The journey between the end stations takes 22 minutes. As such, it is the world's longest gondola lift line.

The opening, initially planned to take place on 29 October 2013, the 90th anniversary Republic Day, was postponed due to delay in construction works of a new bigger station building in Sarıalan Yaylası caused by a court order.

- Teferrüç, Bursa: 395 m (1,296 ft) 40°10′18″N 29°04′59″E
- Kadıyayla, Uludağ: 1,230 m (4,040 ft) 40°09′05″N 29°05′15″E
- Sarıalan Yaylası, Uludağ: 1,630 m (5,350 ft) 40°08′12″N 29°06′23″E
- Oteller, Uludağ: 1,870 m (6,140 ft) 40°06′28″N 29°07′45″E

== See also ==
- List of gondola lifts in Turkey
