= Aerometro (Guatemala) =

Aerial cable car transit system under construction in Guatemala City and Mixco

AeroMetro
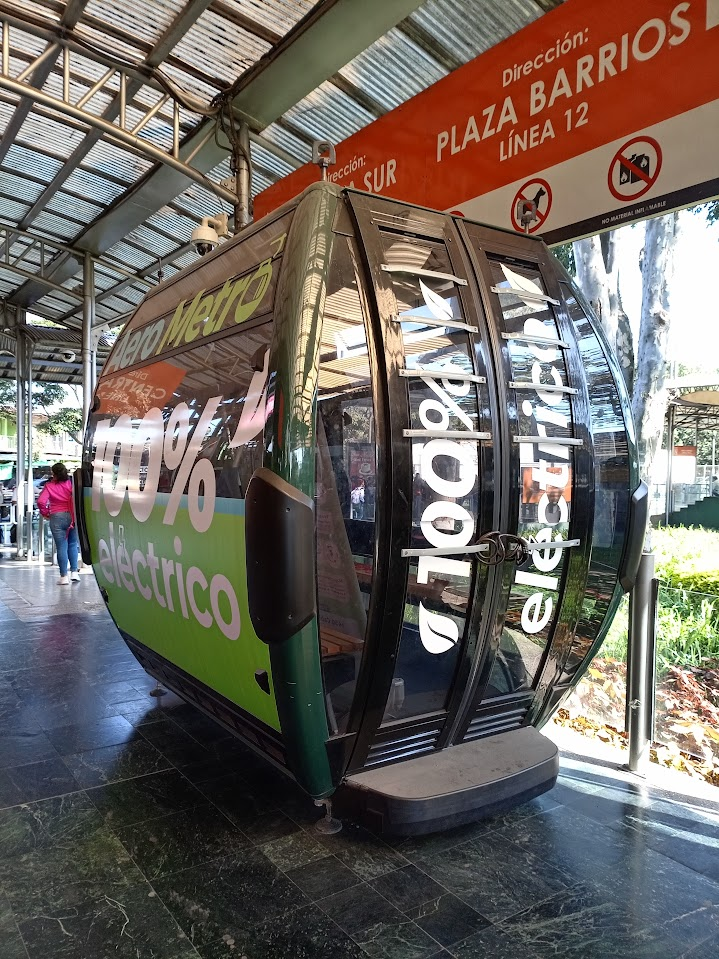

Overview
- Owner: Municipality of Guatemala City / Municipality of Mixco
- Locale: Guatemala City and Mixco, Guatemala
- Daily ridership: 370,000+ projected daily (combined lines)

Operation
- Operator: Private concessionaire (Doppelmayr México y Guatemala)
- Character: Elevated

AeroMetro is an aerial cable car (Spanish: teleférico) public transit system under construction in Guatemala City and the neighboring municipality of Mixco, Guatemala. When completed, it is expected to be the first urban cable-car mass-transit system in Central America, linking zone 2 of Mixco with zone 9 of the Guatemalan capital. The line will be designed, built, and operated by a private company under a 25-year concession granted jointly by the two municipal governments.

== History ==
Planning for a cable-car connection between Guatemala City and Mixco predates the current project by several years; the Municipality of Guatemala published draft bidding terms for the system in January 2019 and commissioned a feasibility study the following June. In February 2020, the municipality formally opened a public tender to select the company that would build and operate the system. Guatemala City mayor Ricardo Quiñónez said at the time that the project had the backing of Guatemala's Directorate General of Civil Aeronautics and of both municipal governments, and put the cost at around Q1.4 billion (roughly US$180 million at contemporary exchange rates).

The concession for Phase I, formally titled "Concession for the Implementation of an Aerial Cable-Car Public Transport System (AeroMetro), Phase I, in the municipalities of Guatemala and Mixco," was approved by the Municipal Council on 4 October 2024. The municipality confirmed the start of construction on the first line on 24 November 2025, and groundwork formally began on 5 January 2026 under the joint supervision of the Guatemala City and Mixco authorities. In May 2026 the municipality announced plans for two additional, not-yet-approved lines: Line 3, which would connect the Obelisco with Condado Concepción, and Line 4, running from Parque La Asunción in zone 5 to Colonia El Paraíso II in zone 18.

== Route ==
Phase I of AeroMetro consists of two lines that share a common terminus at El Trébol, a major interchange in Guatemala City:

- Line 1 runs 2.1 km (1.3 mi) from El Trébol to Plaza España, following Bulevar Liberación and Calle Montúfar through zone 9 of Guatemala City.
- Line 2 is the longer of the two, running 6.8 km (4.2 mi) from El Trébol along Calzada Roosevelt to Molino de las Flores in zone 2 of Mixco.

Combined, the two lines total approximately 8.9 km (5.5 mi). A transfer station known as Centra Occidente is also planned at the boundary between Guatemala City and Mixco, incorporating about 20,000 m² (215,000 sq ft) of public space.

== Operations and technology ==
AeroMetro is being designed and built by Doppelmayr México y Guatemala, a subsidiary of the Austrian ropeway manufacturer Doppelmayr Garaventa Group, which will also operate the system under the concession. Unlike a conventional aerial tramway that halts fully at each stop, AeroMetro is designed as a detachable gondola lift whose cabins slow down, but do not fully stop, as they pass through stations, allowing continuous boarding; a new cabin is expected to depart each station roughly every six seconds. The system's promoters have said it is intended to become one of the highest-capacity urban cableways in the world, with a target capacity said to exceed that of Mexico City's cable-car network. Because Guatemala is in a seismically active region, the operator has cited its experience building similar systems in Mexico, where it has continued operations through several strong earthquakes, as part of the engineering approach for the Guatemalan line. The municipality has said the service will use a two-tier fare structure, though final pricing had not been announced as of early 2025.

== Cost and construction ==
Estimates of the project's cost have varied over time and by source. At the 2020 bidding stage, officials cited a total of about Q1.4 billion (roughly US$180 million). More recent reporting has put the investment at more than Q1.216 billion (around US$150–157 million), funded entirely with private capital from domestic and foreign investors. The project is projected to generate around 500 direct jobs and 2,500 indirect jobs during construction.

As of mid-2026, the contractor reported the project was in the second of four planned construction phases. Estimates for when Phase I will enter service differ by source: the contractor has suggested a timeline of about 18 months from the start of construction to link El Trébol with zone 9, other reporting in early 2026 pointed to service beginning by late 2026 or the first quarter of 2027, while a mid-2026 report cited a planned start of operations in 2028.

== Reception ==
Supporters of the project, including the Municipality of Guatemala, have said AeroMetro could cut travel times on the congested Mixco–Guatemala City corridor by as much as 75 percent, ease traffic on Calzada Roosevelt, and offer a lower-emission alternative to fossil-fuel-powered surface transport. The proposal has also drawn skepticism from some transport analysts and urban planners, who have questioned whether a single cable-car line can meaningfully relieve congestion on its own, and some commentators have noted that proposals for a Guatemala City cable car date back decades.

== See also ==
- Metrocable (Medellín)
- Mi Teleférico
- Gondola lift
- Transport in Guatemala
