= Metrocable =

Metrocable is the name of two urban cable transport systems in South America:

- Metrocable (Medellín), Colombia
- Metrocable (Caracas), Venezuela
