= Popular station =

Gondola station in Colombia

Coordinates: 6.2952°N 75.5481°W

Popular Station Estación Popular
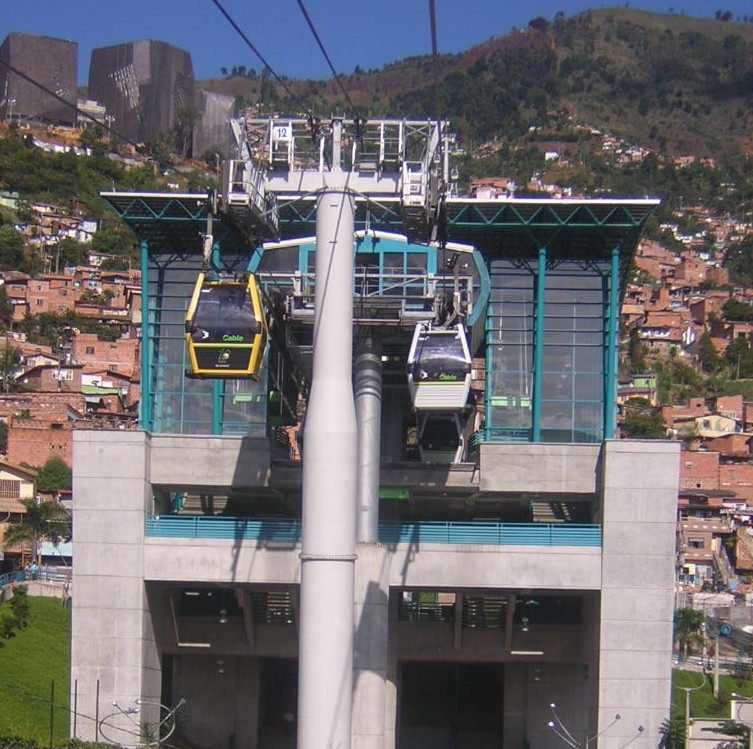
- Panoramic view from the station

General information
- Location: Popular, Medellín; Colombia

Services
Preceding station	Medellín Metro	Following station
Andalucía towards Acevedo	Line K	Santo Domingo Savio Terminus
Location

Popular is the third station on line K of the Metrocable. It is located in the northeast corner of Medellín, in a community known as Popular.
