= Andalucía station =

Metrocable station in Medellín, Colombia

Coordinates: 6.2963°N 75.5518°W

Andalucía Estación Andalucía
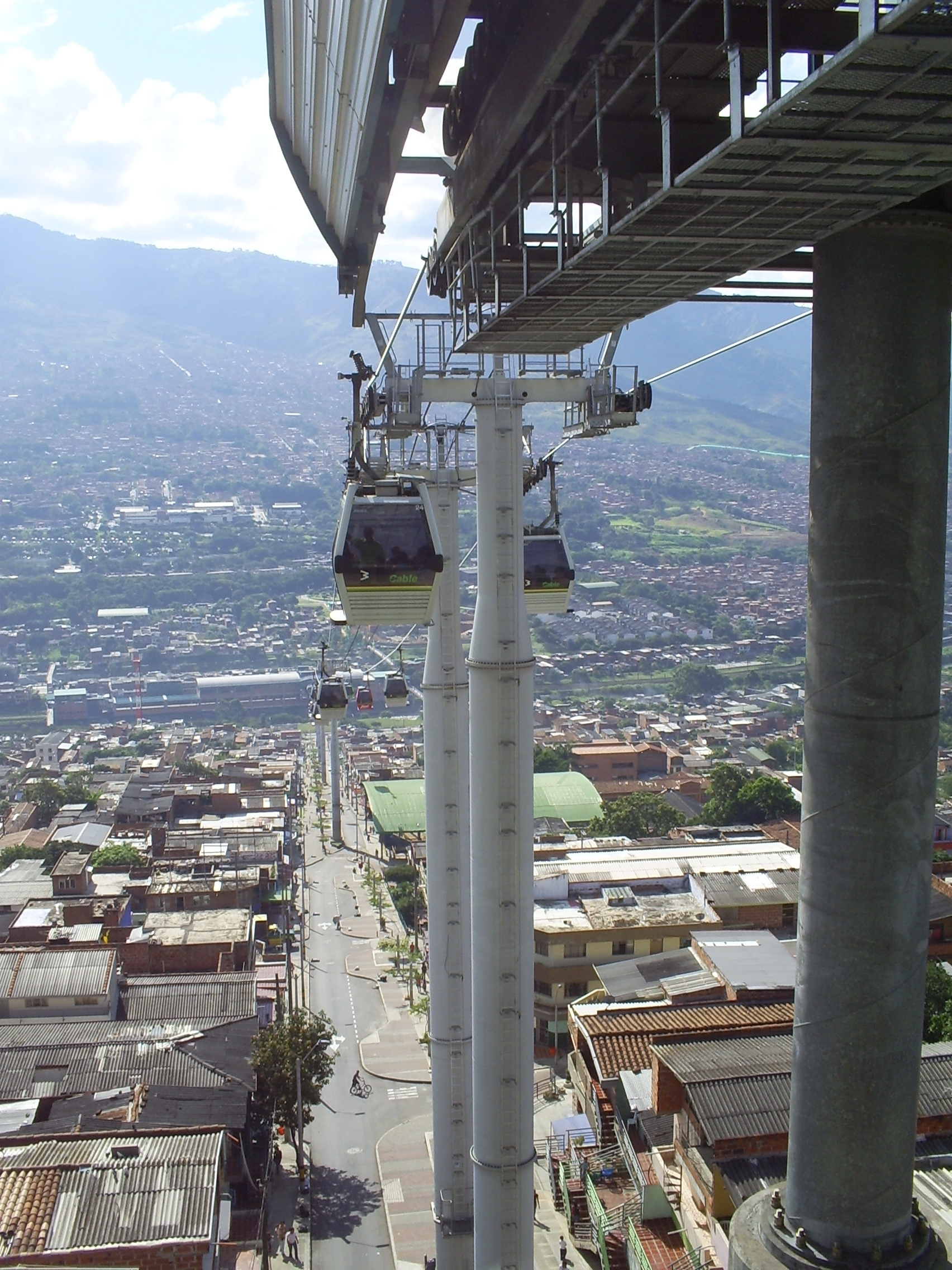
- Panoramic view from the station

General information
- Location: Carrera 46A 107-3, Medellín; Colombia
- Operator: Metro de Medellín

History
- Opened: 7 August 2004; 22 years ago

Services
Preceding station	Medellín Metro	Following station
Acevedo Terminus	Line K	Popular towards Santo Domingo Savio
Location

Andalucía station (Estación Andalucía) is a station on Line K of the Metrocable system in Medellín, Colombia, located between Acevedo and Popular.

== History ==
Line K entered commercial operation on 7 August 2004.
