= Arví station =

Medellín metro station

Coordinates: 6.2815°N 75.5029°W

Arví Station Estación Arví
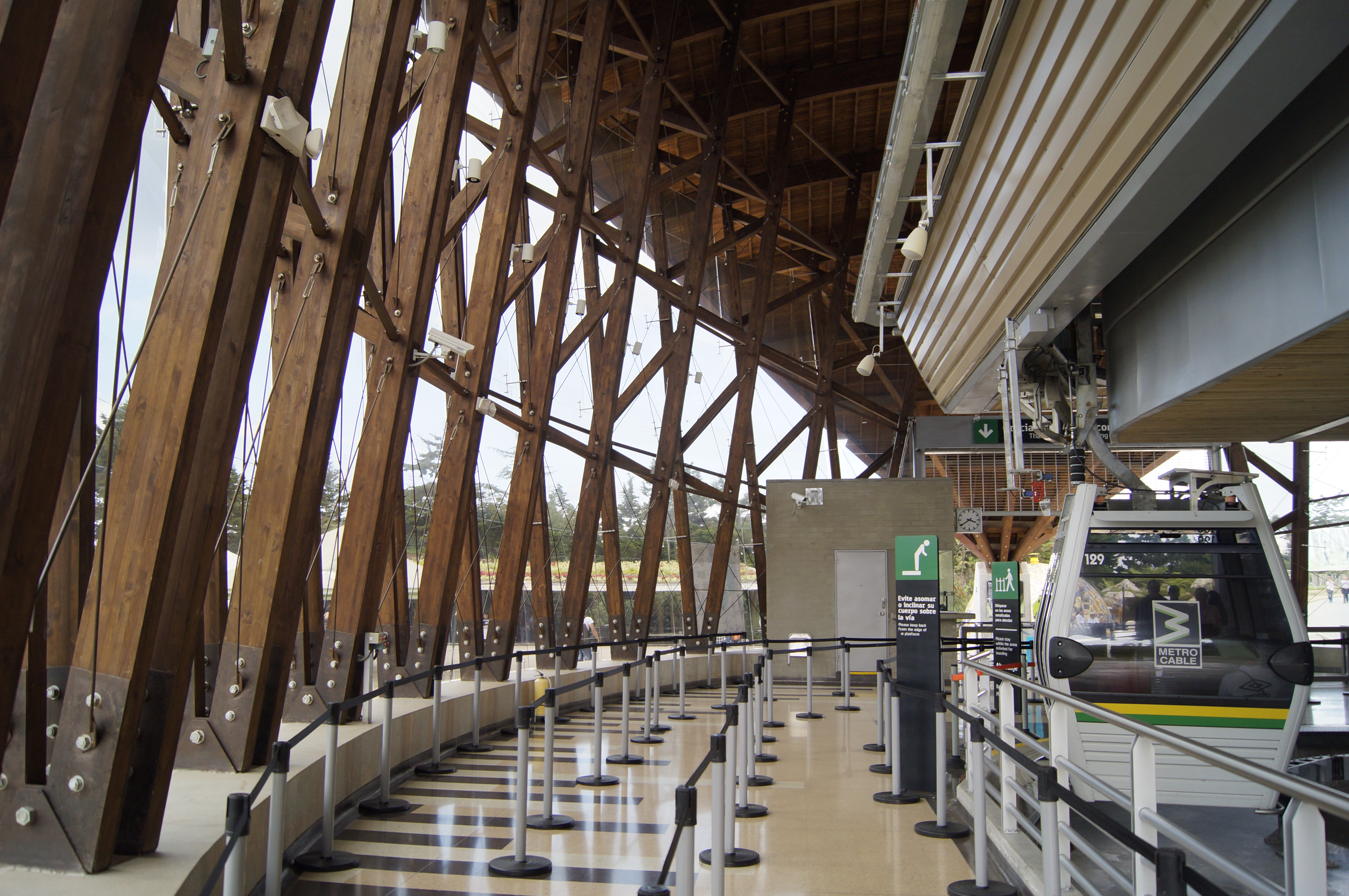
- Arví station

General information
- Location: Santa Elena, Medellín; Colombia

History
- Opened: 2010; 16 years ago

Services
Preceding station	Medellín Metro	Following station
Santo Domingo Savio Terminus	Line L	Terminus
Location

Arví is the second and last station on line L of the Medellín Metro. It is located in the Santa Elena village of Medellín. It was inaugurated in early 2010, along with Arví park, which caters to tourists. It uses the same metrocable system as lines J and K.
