= Metrocable (Caracas) =

Gondola lift system in Caracas, Venezuela

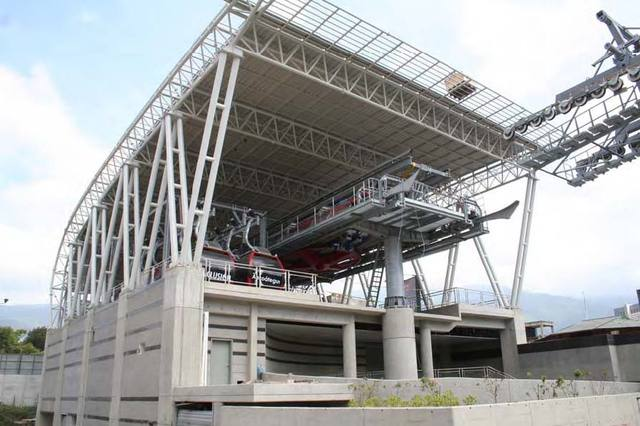
Metrocable de Caracas
City, State	Caracas
Type:	Cable car
in operation since	20 January 2010
Net length	9.8 km
Lines	3
Stations	189
Operator	Metro de Caracas

The Metrocable de Caracas is a gondola lift system integrated with the city's public transport network, which provides quick and safe transportation for those who live in the neighbourhoods situated on Caracas's mountainous regions. The system was built as a tool for social reform with stations set up to accommodate a variety of services such as daycares, libraries, police stations, markets and theatres.

This Metrocable system is part of the growing number of gondola lifts that are now being used for urban transportation purposes (others include the Metrocable (Medellin), Mi Teleférico (La Paz), Portland Aerial Tram, Emirates Air Line and Roosevelt Island Tramway).

== History ==
In 2006, the interdisciplinary design firm Urban-Think Tank (Hubert Klumpner and Alfredo Brillembourg), working with local community leaders and the state government, came up with the idea to build a network of cable cars into the poorest areas of the capital, known as Barrio San Agustín. These plans eventually led to the laying of the foundation stone on 29 November 2006.

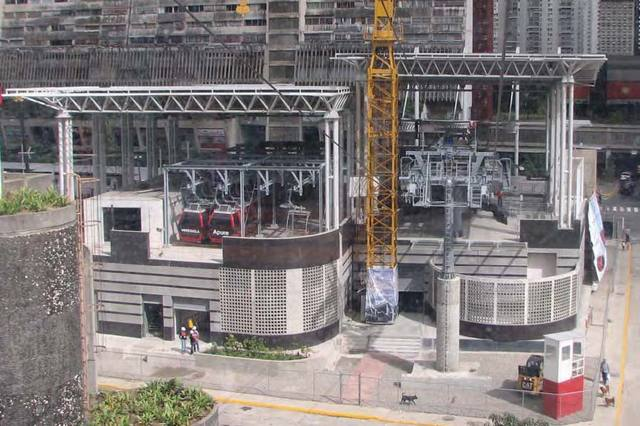
Station Parque Central Metro Cable Caracas.

On 20 April 2007, construction began on the first line, which starts at San Agustín and reaches towards Central Park (Parque Central) station, where it is linked to the subway network. The Ministry of Infrastructure, Austrian aerial lift manufacturer Doppelmayr, and the Brazilian company Odebrecht were all responsible for the construction of the system. The lighting design project and domotic system was developed and installed by the German-Venezuelan lighting design house Dierck Sistemas de Iluminación CA, located in Caracas.

In December 2009, Caracas Metro Cable entered into the testing phase, and in January 2010, the first users of the system were carried: several community leaders from Hornos de Cal to Parque Central.

The line was officially opened on 20 January 2010.

== Description ==
This gondola lift system is fully integrated with the local Metro and has a capacity of 3,000 pphpd (persons per hour per direction). Since its opening in 2010, the system moved on average 1,200 passengers per hour. Each gondola cabin can accommodate up to eight sitters and two standees.

Acting as another pioneer in Cable Propelled Transit (second only to the Metrocable (Medellin)), the Caracas Metrocable was the first cable system to implement 90-degree turns. A passive deflection bullwheel was used at two 90-degree turning stations. As such, the system is essentially made of two separate lines where the gondola cabins switch from one line to a second line at the middle station. The system also has a built in mechanism that allows vehicles to divert – allowing the cabins to return to where they came from instead of switching onto the new line. This provides a major advantage: in the event of a mechanical failure on one line, the second line can still operate .

While the entire Metrocable system had a total cost of $300 million USD, the transit infrastructure cost was only 6% (or $18 million) of that figure.

== Lines and stations ==
Estaciones del Metro Cable de San Agustín
Line	Length (km)	Stations
Metro Cable San Agustín – Parque Central In business since 1/20/2010	1.8	San Agustín
Metro Cable San Agustín – Parque Central In business since 1/20/2010	1.8	El Manguito
Metro Cable San Agustín – Parque Central In business since 1/20/2010	1.8	La Ceiba
Metro Cable San Agustín – Parque Central In business since 1/20/2010	1.8	Hornos de Cal
Metro Cable San Agustín – Parque Central In business since 1/20/2010	1.8	Parque Central
Metro Cable Mariche – Palo Verde In business since 12/10/2012	4.84	Palo Verde
Metro Cable Mariche – Palo Verde In business since 12/10/2012	4.84	Mariche

=== Future plans ===
Currently studies are underway on a cable car line in El Valle, which will consist of two sections, one for El Valle station and a station La Bandera.

Furthermore there are plans to set up – together with the metro line Guarenas–Guatire – another cable car line which will connect the station Caucagüita with the industrial area of Mariche, which is located southeast of the municipality of Sucre.

== Units ==
The cabins are built from aluminum and use an electrical power supply; they are connected by several towers of steel and concrete. Each cabin has interior lighting, a communications system and a maximum capacity of eight persons. The gondolas depart from the stations every 27 seconds, allowing the transport of 15000-20000 people per day. The cabins which make up the system, were manufactured by the CWA company and adapted to the system Doppelmayr, the same as in the Caracas Aerial Tramway, which opened 1955.

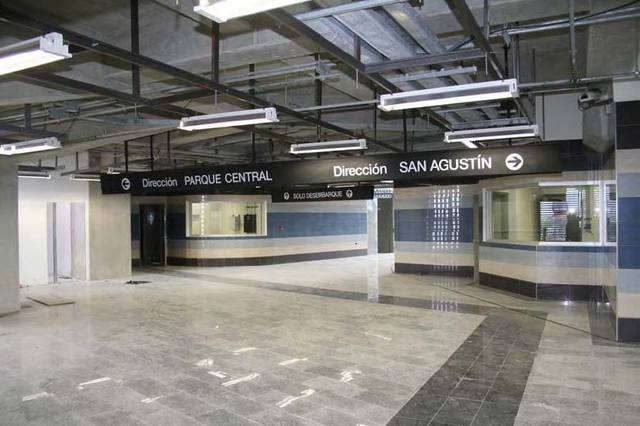
Inside the station Hornos de Cal

== See also ==
- Gondola lift
- Metro de Caracas
- Caracas Aerial Tramway
- Mérida cable car
- Metrocable (Medellin) (Colombia)
- Aerovia (Guayaquil) (Ecuador)
- Portland Aerial Tram
- Roosevelt Island Tramway
