= Arví Park =

Park in Medellín, Colombia

Coordinates: 6.2656°N 75.4969°W

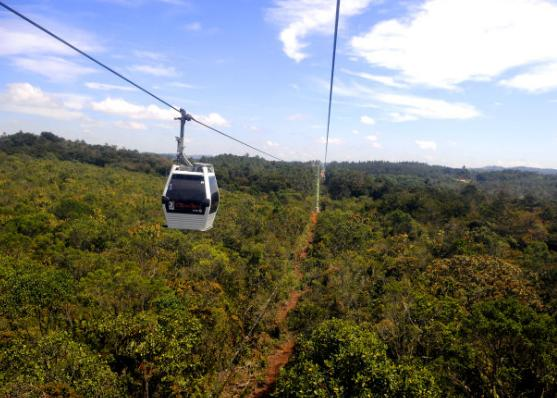
Parque Arví view in 2010

Arví Park (also known in Spanish as "Ecotourism Park Arví") is both an ecological nature preserve and Pre-Hispanic archeological site on the eastern slopes of Aburrá Valley, in the northeast area of Medellín, Colombia. The park covers several other municipalities of Antioquia, including Envigado, Bello, and Copacabana. It covers 16,000 hectares, 1,760 of which consist of natural forests. It is also equipped with 54 miles of walkable trails. It is a major tourist attraction, known for its wildflowers, butterflies and trails. Activities include hiking, nature tours, cycling, and outdoor adventure sports. An outdoor food market is located next to the gondola station. The Piedras Blancas Ecological Hotel and its private reserve are adjacent to the park.

The park can be reached from downtown Medellín via the metro station. Line L on the Medellín Metro goes to Arví Station, where there is a direct link to the metrocables that go to the park.

== Development ==
The investment in this huge park, the largest of its kind in the country, is made entirely by regional state agencies, and it has achieved the feat of offering 12 square meters of parkland for each resident of Medellin, where before it was only 4 meters.

Thanks to the joint efforts of many companies Antioquia (EPM, the Metro de Medellín, Comfenalco, and several others) the park is now a reality.

== Pre-Hispanic constructions ==
The park features sections of prehispanic construction, including antique buildings, water works, platforms, roads, gardens and ditches. It has trail called "Camino Cieza de León" or the "Prehispanic Trail", which can be more than 1,500 years old. It is very wide, built of stone, and is still well preserved some of the original parts.

== Access via Metrocable ==
Among the most featured attractions of Arví Park is its access system, which is realized through a metrocable that is oriented towards ecological tourism.

Cable Arví, also called Metrocable Line L, is a section of the cable cars that connects Santo Domingo Savio station with Arví Ecotourism Park. It is the first tourist line of the Metro and the third by cable car System, and began commercial operation in February 2010.
