= Madera station (Medellín) =

Medellín metro station

Madera Station Estación Madera
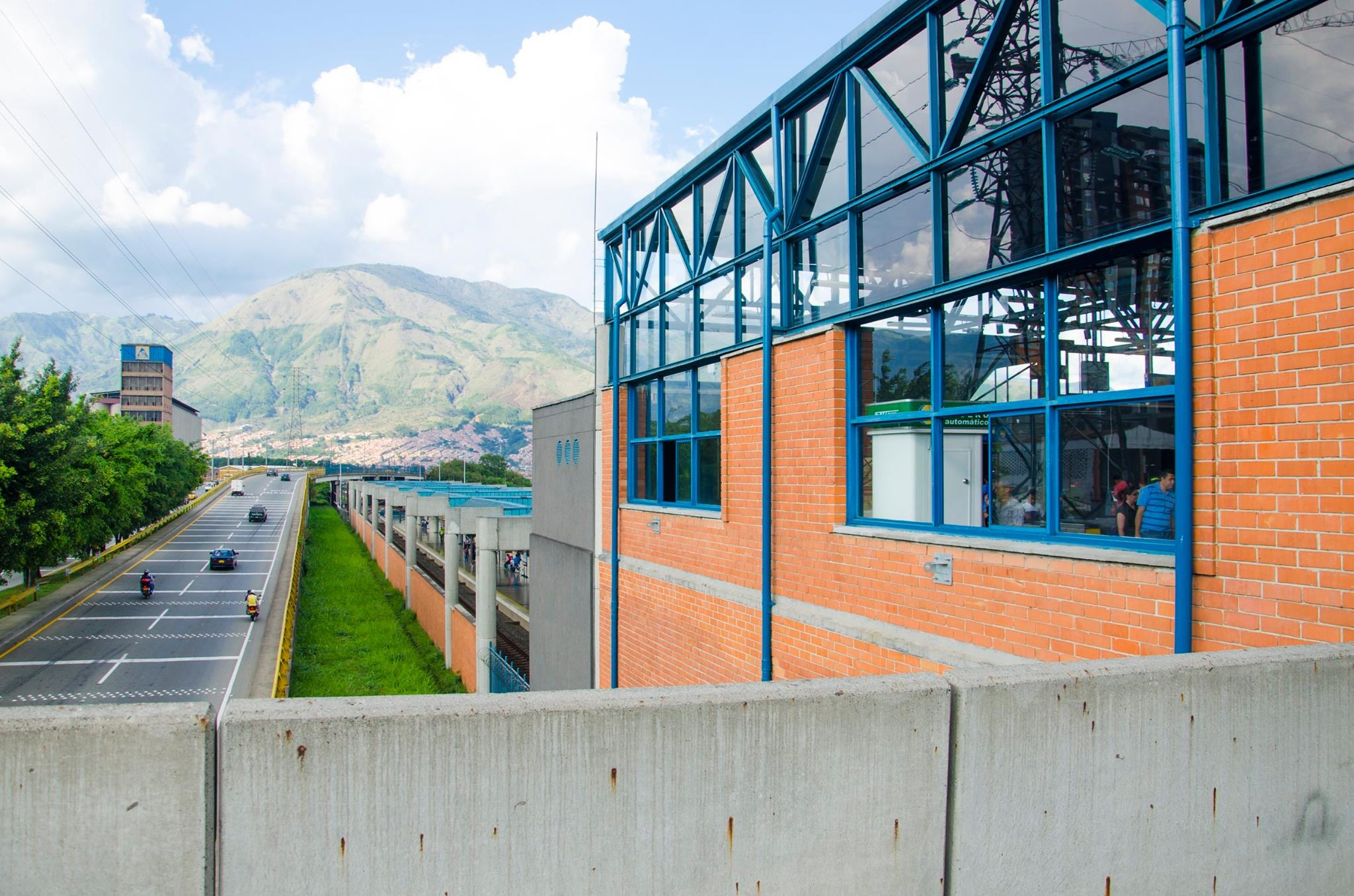
- Madera Station in 2016

General information
- Location: Carrera 49 # 25B - 20., Medellín; Colombia
- Coordinates: 6°18′57″N 75°33′19.5″W

History
- Opened: 30 November 1995; 30 years ago

Services
Preceding station	Medellín Metro	Following station
Bello towards Niquía	Line A	Acevedo towards La Estrella
Location

Madera is the third station of the Medellín Metro from north to south on line A. It is located in the northernmost part of the municipality of Medellín, close to the natural boundary with Bello and is an access point to the southern suburbs of Bello. The station is named for the creek that forms a natural boundary between the cities of Medellín and Bello: La Madera Creek. The station was opened on 30 November 1995 as part of the inaugural section of line A, from Niquía to Poblado.

In 2026, elevators were added to the station as part of renovations made to ten stations on line A to improve accessibility.
