= Tricentenario station =

Medellín metro station

Coordinates: 6.2904°N 75.5647°W

Tricentenario Station Estación Tricentenario
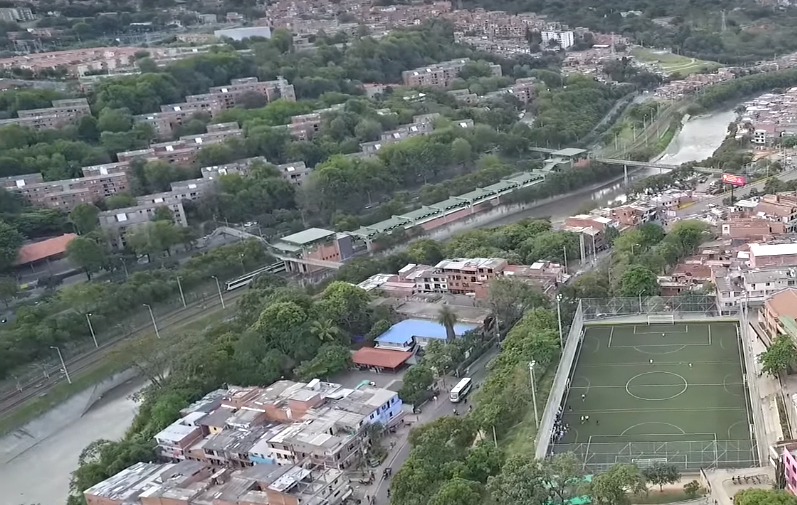
- Estación Tricentenario (Metro de Medellín)

General information
- Location: Carrera 63 # 94° 508, Medellín; Colombia

History
- Opened: 30 November 1995; 30 years ago

Services
Preceding station	Medellín Metro	Following station
Acevedo towards Niquía	Line A	Caribe towards La Estrella
Location

Tricentenario is the fifth station of the Medellín Metro on Line A going north-south. It is located in the northern part of the municipality of Medellín, the second station in the territory of the municipality with the largest number of stations within the metropolitan area today. The station was opened on 30 November 1995 as part of the inaugural section of line A, from Niquía to Poblado.

It lies between two major traditional working class areas of the city of Medellín: the Castilla and Aranjuez municipalities. With the town of Bello, said municipalities evolved through the history of development of the metropolitan area as the main areas of labor during industrialization.

== Description ==
From the station part two pedestrian bridges to the east and west that connect the two main urban axes of northern Medellín: the west provides access to the Castilla district (commune 5) and the east leads to the Aranjuez (commune 4).
