= Bello station =

Medellín metro station

Bello Station Estación Bello
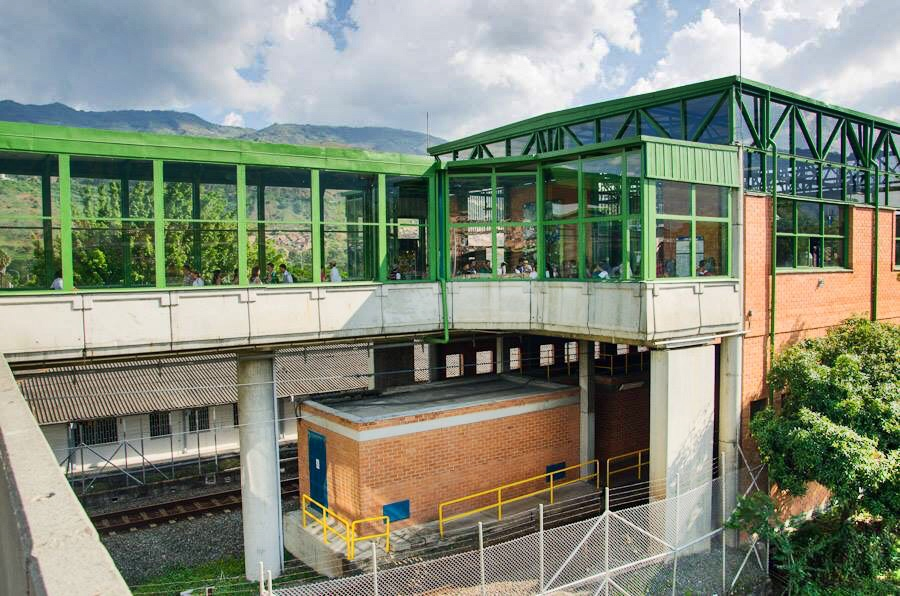
- Estación Bello Metro de Medellín

General information
- Location: Calle 44 # 46 – 001 (104), Medellín; Colombia
- Coordinates: 6°19′49″N 75°33′13″W

History
- Opened: 30 November 1995; 30 years ago

Services
Preceding station	Medellín Metro	Following station
Niquía Terminus	Line A	Madera towards La Estrella
Location

Bello is the second station on the Medellín Metro from north to south on line A. It is located in the middle of Bello, the second most populous city in the metropolitan area, after Medellín. The station was opened on 30 November 1995 as part of the inaugural section of line A, from Niquía to Poblado.

The station is an access point to the central districts of the city and is located on a site of great historical significance of this region of the Aburrá Valley: the old Bello National Railways and traditional textile factories.
