= Santo Domingo Savio station =

Medellín metrocable station

Coordinates: 6.2932°N 75.5417°W

Santo Domingo Savio Station Estación Santo Domingo Savio
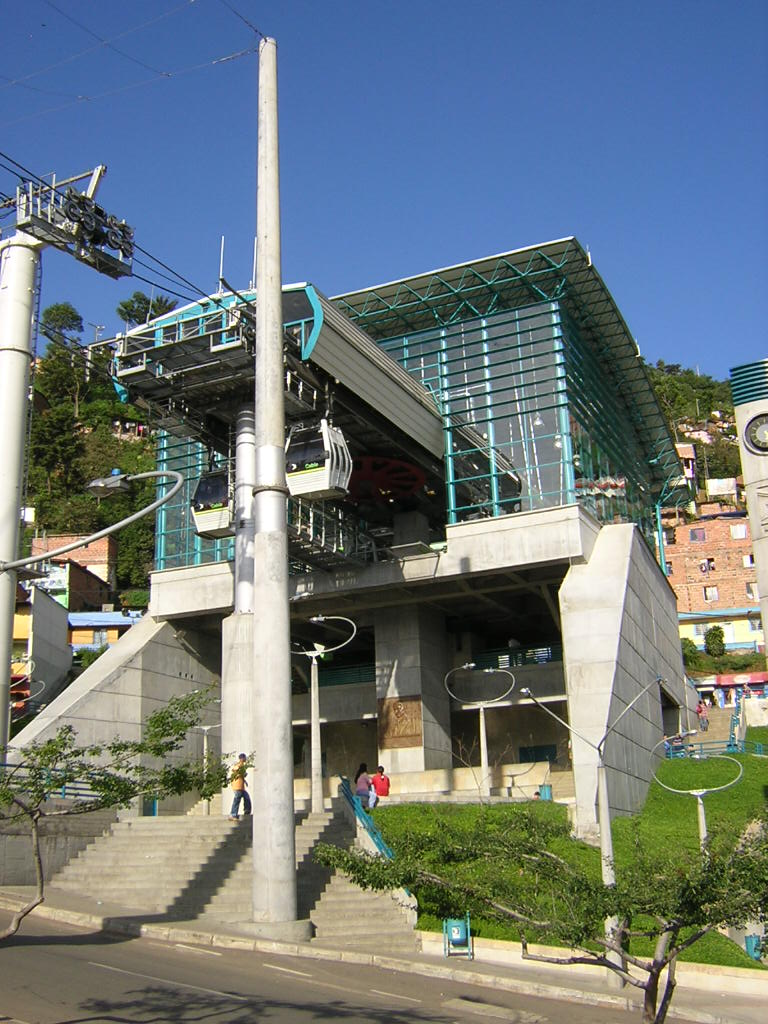
- View of the station

General information
- Location: Popular, Medellín; Colombia

Services
Preceding station	Medellín Metro	Following station
Popular towards Acevedo	Line K	Terminus
Terminus	Line L	Arví Terminus
Location

Santo Domingo Savio is the fourth and last station on line K of the Metrocable, and the first station on line L. It is located in the northeast of Medellín. The station is named after Dominic Savio.
