= Aerovía (Guayaquil) =

Cable car system in Ecuador

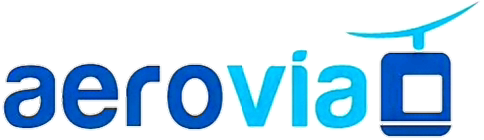
Guayaquil's Aerovia

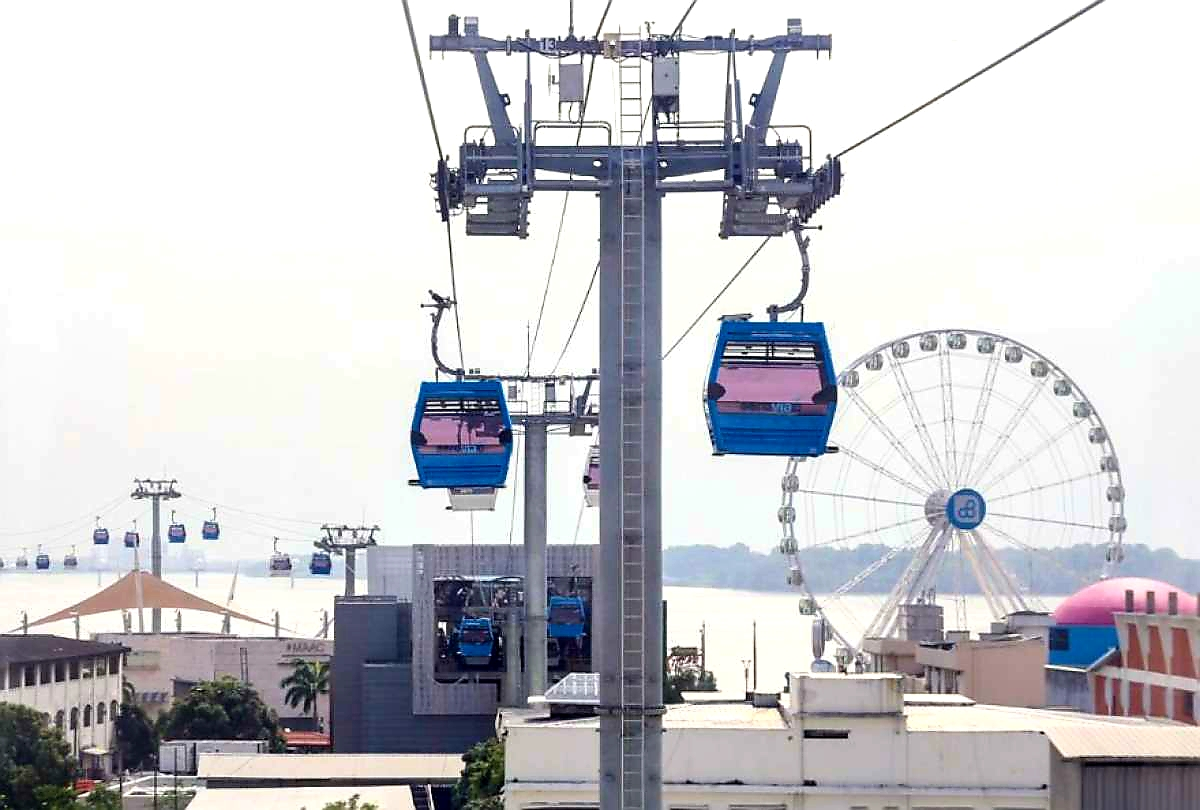
- First Gondola lift in Ecuador
- Interactive map of Guayaquil's Aerovia

Overview
- Status: Operational
- Character: Urban
- Location: Guayaquil, Ecuador
- Termini: Parque del Centenario; Durán
- No. of stations: 5
- Open: December 21, 2020; 4 years ago

Technical features
- Line length: 3,340 m (10,960 ft)
- Operating speed: 10 miles per hour (16 km/h)
- Notes: Electric motor powering cable bullwheel

Aerovía is a multimodal mass transportation system (by cable and power bus) that contributes to sustainability and urban integration between Guayaquil and Durán.

== General information ==
The Aerovía has five stations, one is technical and does not receive passengers. It has 154 cabins with capacity for ten passengers. During the COVID-19 pandemic, capacity was restricted to five users per cabin. In Durán, users can use the urban buses of two cooperatives at no additional cost, which take them to the most representative populated sectors of the neighboring canton.

To take the Aerovía, passengers must buy a card (tarjeta) for $2, on which they can put funds they will use to pay for their trips. Each one-way trip costs $0.70 (or $0.35 for those who benefit from a reduced fare). Senior citizens, children and teenagers, students, and disabled people benefit from a reduced fare.

In general, the Aerovía operates from 5:30 AM to 9:30 PM. During the various states of emergency in Ecuador during 2022, the operating hours were often reduced.

Going from one terminal station to the other takes 17 minutes.

== Construction and operation ==
The Aerovía was built between 2018 and 2021. It started operating in January 2021. It was built and is operated by a consortium, Consorcio Aerosuspendido Guayaquil, that is made up of Sofratesa and POMA.

== Infrastructure ==
The Aerovía consists of a cable car line (Guayaquil - Durán Line) with a length of 4.1 km, 5 stations and 154 cabins.

Duran - Guayaquil Line
Photo	Station	Interchange	Location
	Parque del Centenario	Parque del Centenario	Quito Avenue and 9 de Octubre Avenue
	Julián Coronel		Julián Coronel Street and Quito Avenue.
	Técnica		Luis Vernaza Hospital.
	Cuatro Mosqueteros	Las Peñas	Malecón Simón Bolívar Avenue and Loja Street.
	Durán		Durán's Malecon.

== See also ==
- Cable car
- Metrovia
- Metrocable (Medellín)
