= Acevedo station =

Medellín metro station

Acevedo Station Estación Acevedo
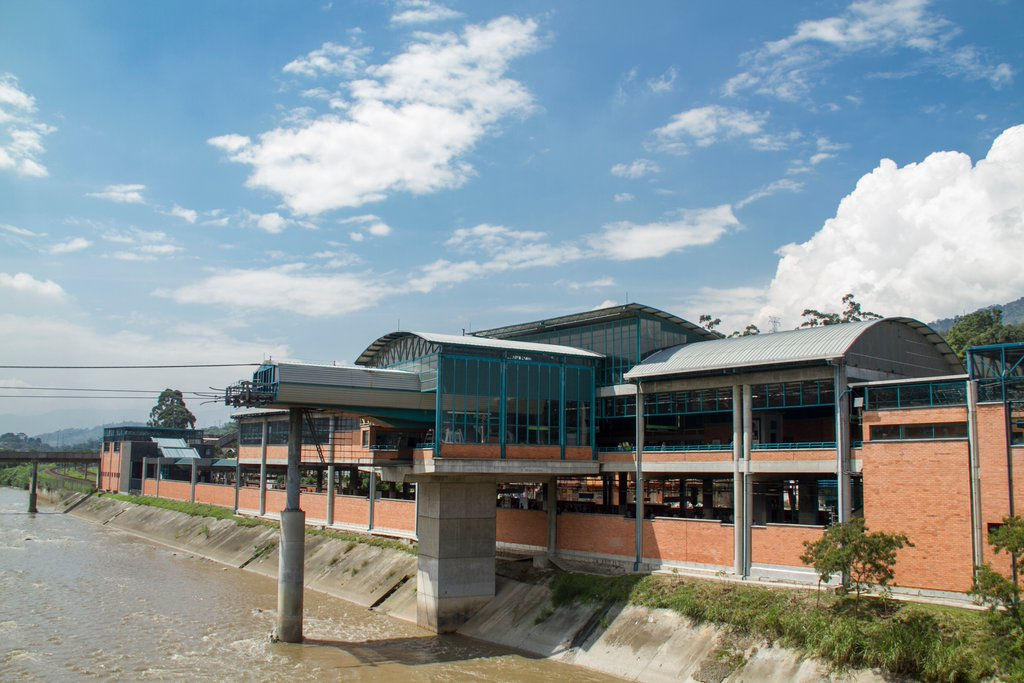
- Estación Acevedo Metro de Medellín(1)

General information
- Location: Carrera 63 # 103G - 202, Medellín; Colombia
- Coordinates: 6°18′01″N 75°33′30.5″W

History
- Opened: 30 November 1995; 30 years ago

Services
Preceding station	Medellín Metro	Following station
Madera towards Niquía	Line A	Tricentenario towards La Estrella
Terminus	Line K	Andalucía towards Santo Domingo Savio
Terminus	Line P	SENA towards El Progreso
Location

Acevedo is the fourth station of the Medellín Metro from north to south on line A and the first station on line K and P. It is located in the northernmost part of the municipality of Medellín, close to the natural boundary with Bello. The station was opened on 30 November 1995 as part of the inaugural section of line A, from Niquía to Poblado.

The transfer station is line K leading to the Santo Domingo Savio neighborhood (northeast of the city) by the Metro Cable.
