= Gondola lift =

Aerial cable transport with looped track

Gondola
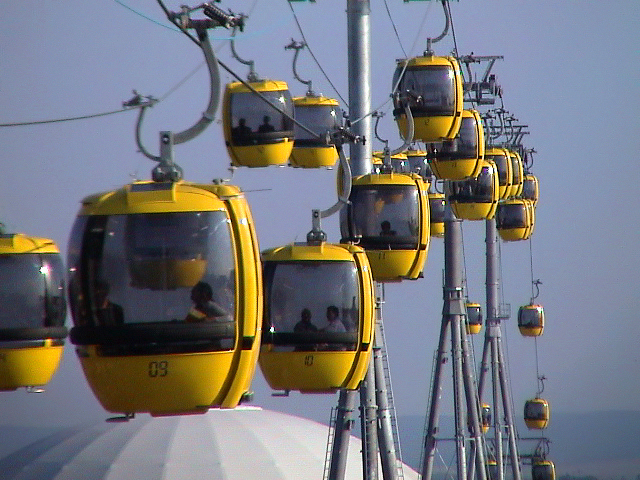
- Gondola lift at the Expo 2000 in Hanover, Germany
- Type: Cable transport

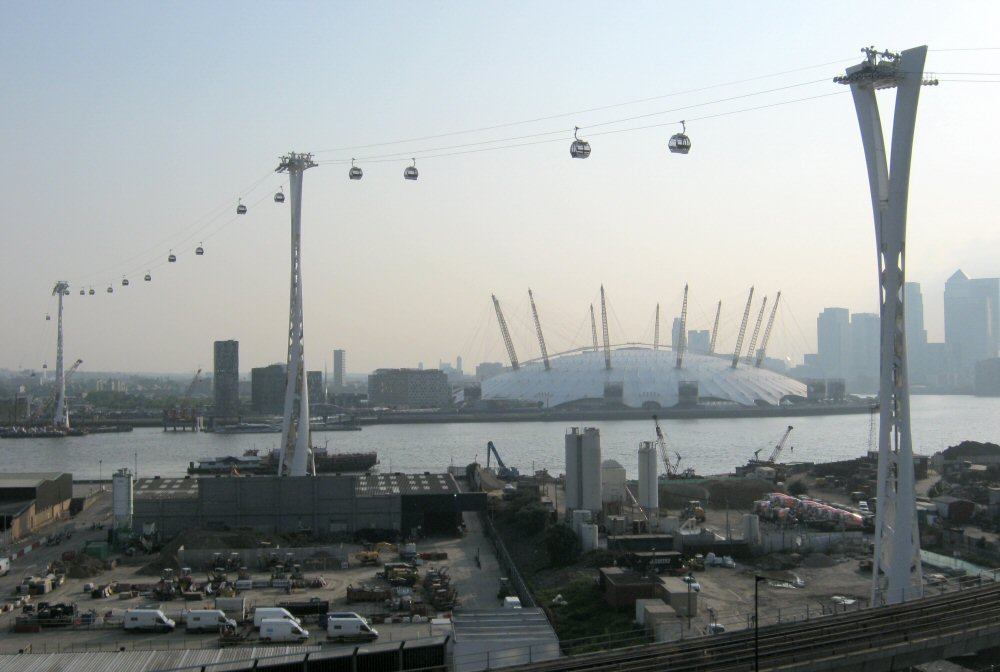
The London Cable Car over River Thames

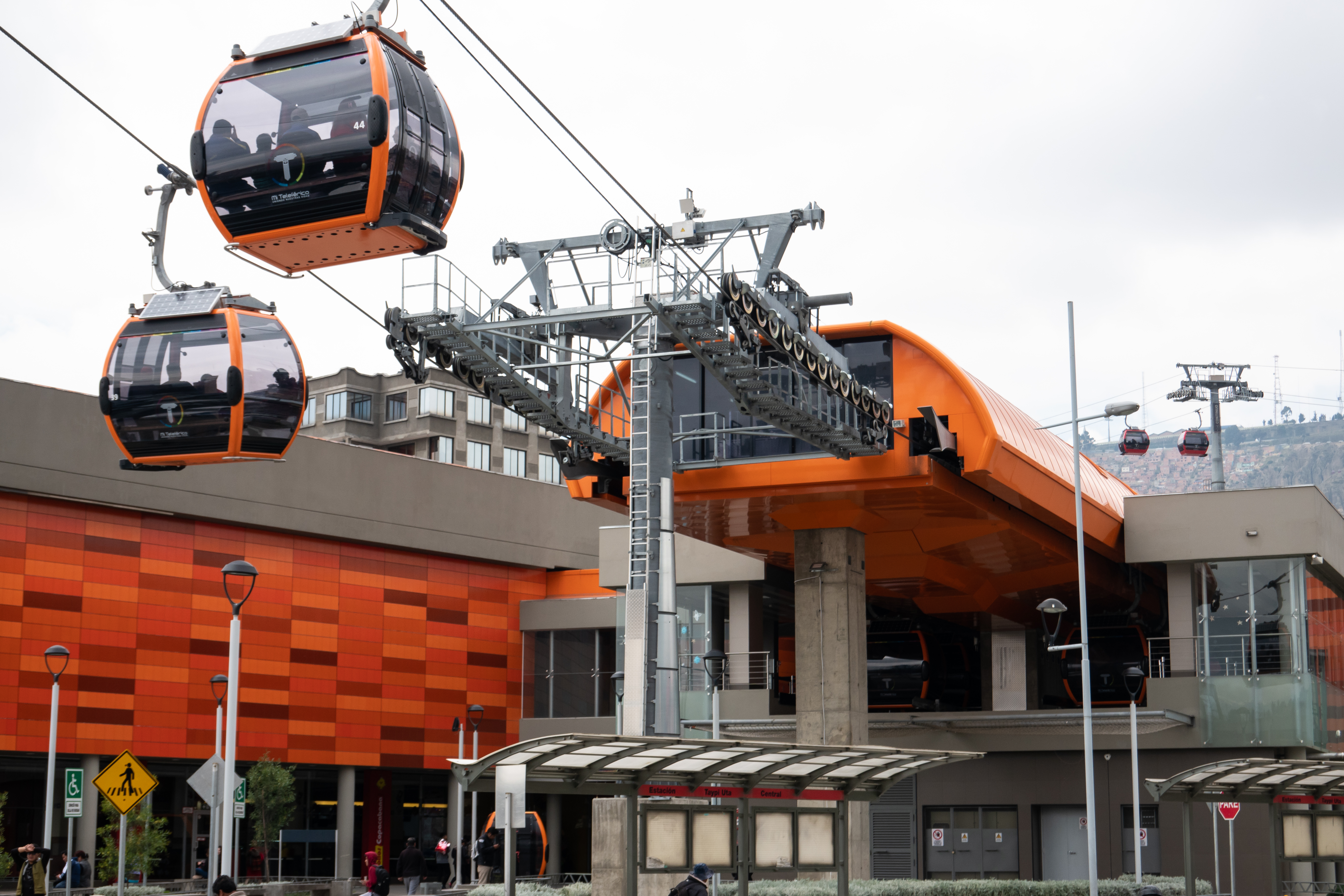
Mi Teleférico in La Paz, Bolivia, the highest and longest urban cable car system in the world

A gondola lift (cable car) is a means of cable transport and type of aerial lift which is supported and propelled by cables from above. It consists of a loop of steel wire rope that is strung between two stations, sometimes over intermediate supporting towers. The cable is driven by a bullwheel in a terminal, which is typically connected to an engine or electric motor. It is often considered a continuous system since it features a haul rope which continuously moves and circulates around two terminal stations. In contrast, an aerial tramway operates solely with fixed grips and simply shuttles back and forth between two end terminals.

The capacity, cost, and functionality of a gondola lift will differ dramatically depending on the combination of cables used for support and haulage and the type of grip (detachable or fixed). Because of the proliferation of such systems in the Alps, the Italian: Cabinovia and French: Télécabine are also used in English-language texts.

== History ==
The Kohlerer-Bahn opened on June 29, 1908, in Bolzano, South Tyrol, the first modern aerial enclosed cable car solely for passenger service.

== Types ==
=== Passenger lift ===
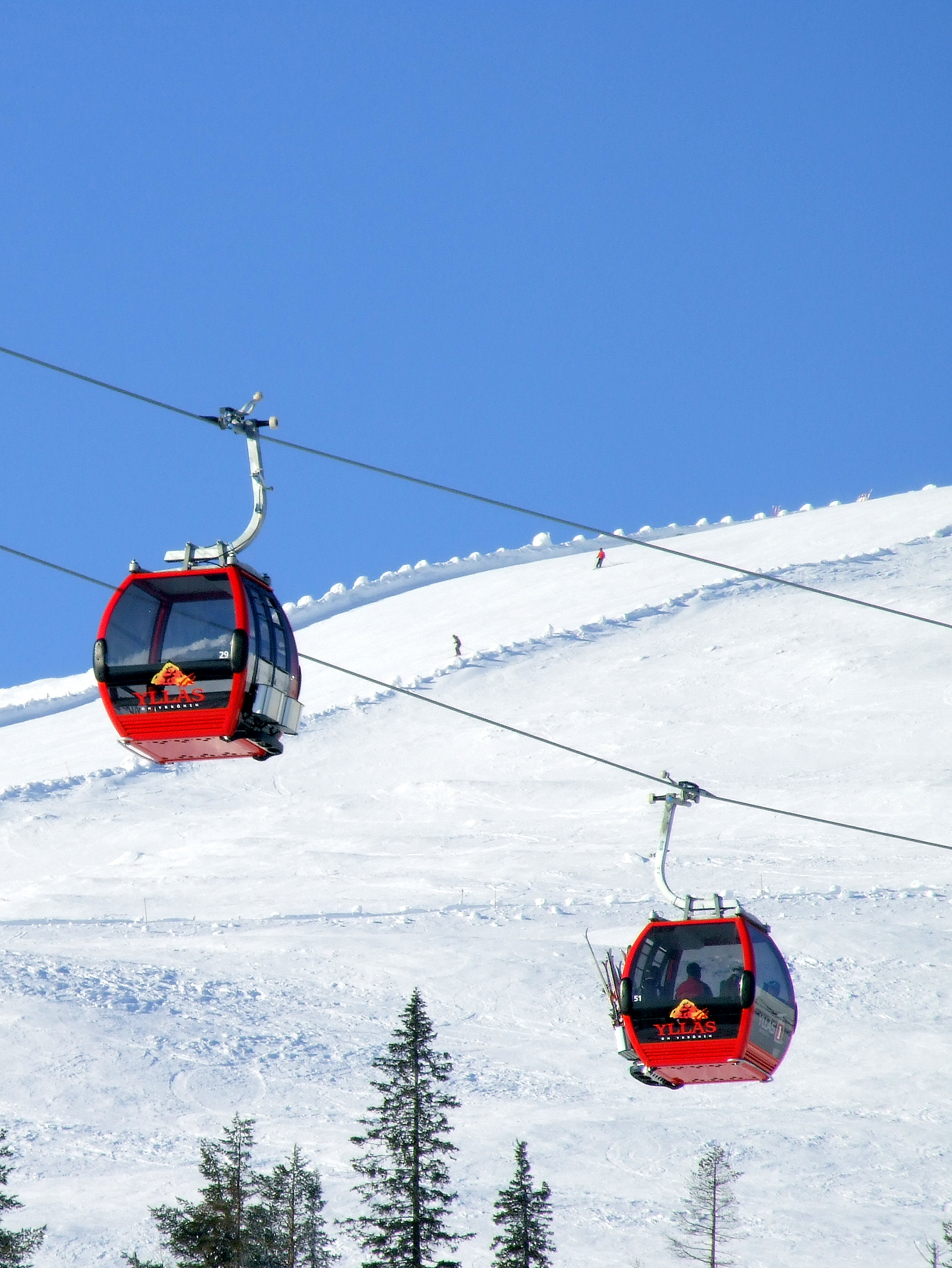
Gondola lift at the Ylläs ski resort in Lapland, Finland

In some systems the passenger cabins, which can hold between two and fifteen people, are connected to the cable by means of spring–loaded grips. These grips allow the cabin to be detached from the moving cable and slowed in the terminals, to allow passengers to board and disembark. Doors are almost always automatic and controlled by a lever on the roof or on the undercarriage that is pushed up or down. Cabins are driven through the terminals either by rotating tires, or by a chain system. To be accelerated to and decelerated from line speed, cabins are driven along by progressively swifter (or slower) rotating tires until they reach line or terminal speed. On older installations, gondolas are accelerated manually by an operator. Gondola lifts can have intermediate stops that allow for uploading and downloading on the lift. Examples of a lift with three stops instead of the standard two are the Village Gondola, the Excalibur Gondolas at Whistler Blackcomb and the Skyride at Alton Towers.

In other systems the cable is slowed intermittently to allow passengers to disembark and embark the cabins at stations, and to allow people in the cars along the route to take photographs, such as Lebanon's Téléférique which offers an exceptional view to the Mediterranean, the historical Jounieh Bay and the pine forest at the 80% slope which this gondola lift goes over. Such a system is called pulse cabin and usually several cabins are loaded simultaneously.

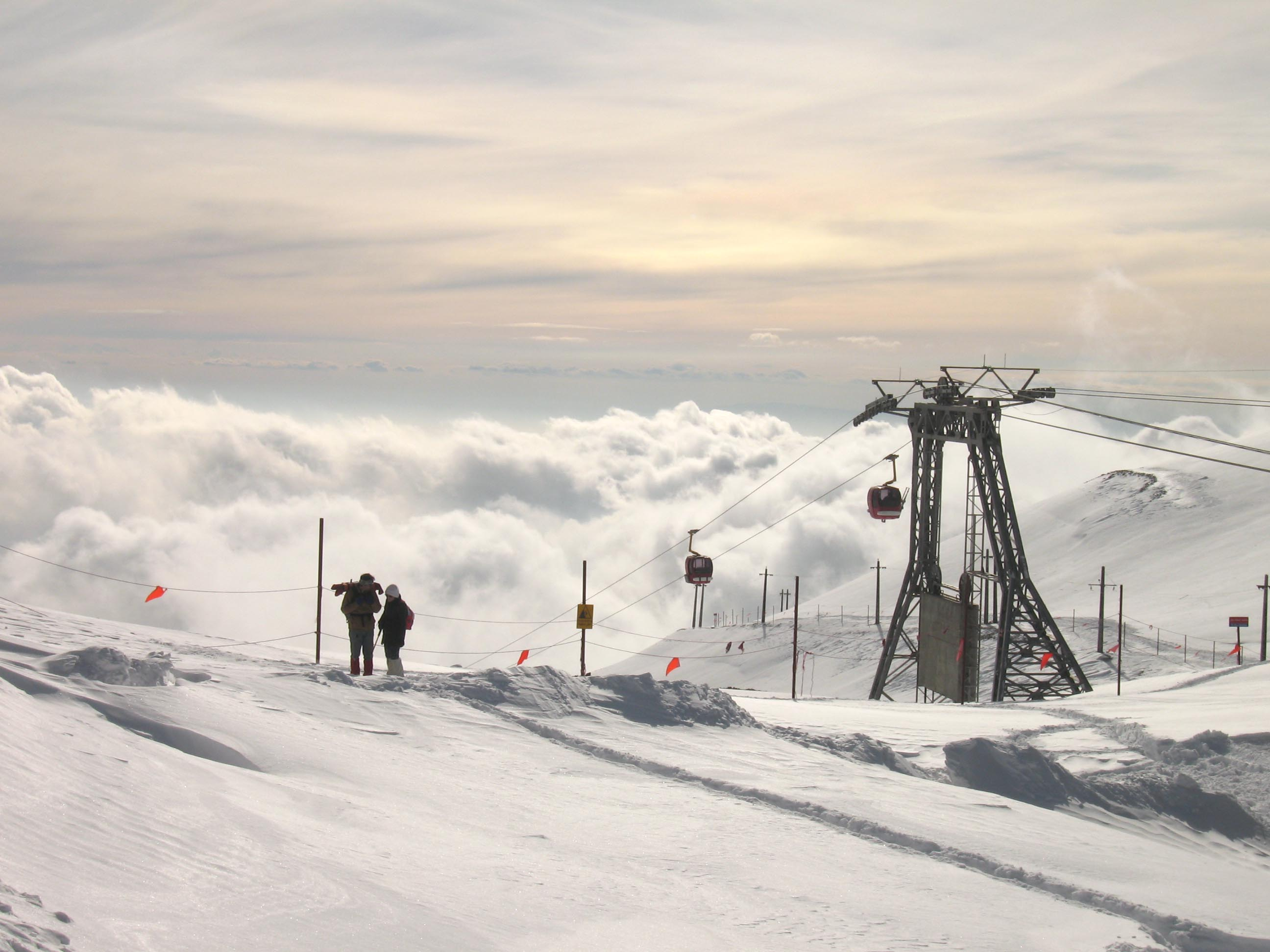
Tochal mountain telecabine in Tehran Province at 3,800 meters elevation

Open-air gondolas, or cabriolets as commonly called, are fairly uncommon and are quite primitive because they are exposed to the elements. Their cabins are usually hollow cylinders, open from chest height up, with floors and roof covers. They are usually used as village gondolas and for short distances. Examples are at Mont Tremblant Resort in Quebec, Canada, and at Blue Mountain Ski Resort (summer only, in the winter it is converted to a six person high-speed chairlift.) in Ontario, Canada, The Canyons Resort in Park City, Utah, Mountain Creek, and the new Village Cabriolet at Winter Park Resort in Colorado. Open-air gondolas can also come in a style similar to that of pulse gondolas, like the Village Gondola at Panorama Ski Resort, British Columbia.

The first gondola built in the United States for a ski resort was at the Wildcat Mountain Ski Area. It was a two-person gondola built in 1957 and serviced skiers until 1999. The lift was later demolished in 2004. The lift and its cabins were manufactured by a former Italian lift company: Carlevaro-Savio. One of the longest gondola rides in the world, Gondelbahn Grindelwald-Männlichen, is in the Bernese Oberland in Switzerland and connects Grindelwald with Männlichen.

==== Urban transport ====
In recent years, gondola lifts are finding increased usage in urban environments. Cable cars used for urban transit include:

- Metrocable in Medellín, Colombia
- TransMiCable in Bogotá, Colombia
- Aerovia in Guayaquil, Ecuador
- the Portland Aerial Tram in Portland, Oregon, United States
- Roosevelt Island Tramway in New York City, New York, United States
- Metrocable in Caracas, Venezuela
- Trolcable in Mérida, Venezuela
- Cable Aéreo in Manizales, Colombia
- Mi Teleférico in La Paz, Bolivia
- Mexicable in the State of Mexico, Mexico
- Teleférico de Santo Domingo
- Yenimahalle-Şentepe teleferik in Ankara, Turkey
- Maçka and Eyüp Gondolas in Istanbul
- the London cable car in London, England
- Nizhny Novgorod Cableway, Russia
- Câble 1 in the suburbs of Paris, France

The Metrocable systems in Medellin and Caracas are fully integrated with the public transit network which provides passengers the ability to seamlessly transfer to the local metro lines, whereas the network in La Paz, the largest in the world, forms the backbone of the city's public transit system itself.

Disney Skyliner is a gondola-lift service, which opened on September 29, 2019, at Walt Disney World in central Florida. The system uses multiple lines and has five stations, and it connects Epcot and Disney's Hollywood Studios with one another and with several Disney-owned and -operated resort hotels.

In terms of urban gondola systems for the future, TransLink in Metro Vancouver has proposed to build a gondola up Burnaby Mountain to Simon Fraser University in an announcement in September 2010. The project was sidelined in 2014, but was revived in 2017.

A 3.75 km Urban Gondola is under construction in Varanasi, India called the Kashi ropeway since 2022. It is expected to start operations in 2026.

In late 2012, a widespread aerial gondola system was proposed for Austin, Texas, in an effort to expand mass transit options in the rapidly growing city. The proposal was rejected by the local transit agency in 2017.

A proposed gondola system in Montreal was ultimately rejected by the Old Port of Montreal.

=== Ropeway conveyor ===
A ropeway conveyor or material ropeway is essentially a subtype of gondola lift, from which containers for goods rather than passenger cars are suspended.

Ropeway conveyors are typically found around large mining concerns, and can be of considerable length. The COMILOG Cableway, which ran from Moanda in Gabon to Mbinda in the Republic of the Congo, was over 75 kilometers (47 mi) in length. The Kristineberg-Boliden ropeway in Sweden had a length of 96 kilometers (60 mi).

In Eritrea, the Italians built the Asmara-Massawa Cableway in 1936, which was 75 kilometers (47 mi) long. The Manizales - Mariquita Cableway (1922) in Colombia was 73 km long.

Conveyors can be powered by a wide variety of forms of power sources: electric motors, internal combustion engines, steam engines, or gravity. Gravity is particularly common in mountainous mining concerns, and directly employed; the weight of loaded down-going containers pulling the returning empties back up the slope. Gravity can also be used indirectly, where running water is available; a waterwheel is powered by gravity acting on water, and is used to power the cable.

=== Bicable and tricable gondola lifts ===
Conventional systems where a single cable provides both support and propulsion of the cabins are often called monocable gondola lifts. Gondola lifts which feature one stationary cable (known as the 'support' rope), and one haul rope are known as bicable gondola lifts, while lifts that feature two support ropes and one haul rope are known as tricable gondola lifts. Famous examples of bicable gondola lifts include the Ngong Ping 360 in Hong Kong, the Singapore Cable Car, and the Sulphur Mountain Gondola in Banff, Canada. This system has the advantage that the stationary cable's strength and properties can be tailored to each span, which reduces costs. They differ from aerial tramways, as these consist only of one or two usually larger cabins moving back and forth, rather than circulating. Bicable and tricable systems provide greater lateral stability compared with monocable systems, allowing the system to operate in higher cross-winds.

== List of accidents ==
The National Ski Areas Association reports 0.138 fatalities per 100 million miles transported compared to 1.23 for cars.

- October 22, 1979: one person was killed and 17 others injured when two gondolas fell from the "Swiss Sky Ride" at the Texas State Fair. Winds gusting to 40 miles per hour (64 km/h) caused three cars to collide and two fell on midway games below the cable.
- January 29, 1983: seven people were killed in the Singapore Cable Car disaster when two cabins plunged into the sea after the cableway was hit by a Panamanian-registered oil rig being towed.
- September 5, 2005: nine people died and ten were injured when a 750-kilogram (1,650 lb) concrete block was accidentally dropped by a construction helicopter in Sölden, Austria. Hundreds had to be evacuated from the lift.
- March 2, 2008: a man fell out of a gondola in Chamonix and died, perhaps after he and one of his friends leaned on and broke the plexiglass window.

== See also ==
- Aerial lift
  - Aerial tramway
- Cable car (railway)
- Gadgetbahn
- List of gondola lifts
- List of aerial lift manufacturers
- Ropeway conveyor
