= Manizales Gondola Lift =

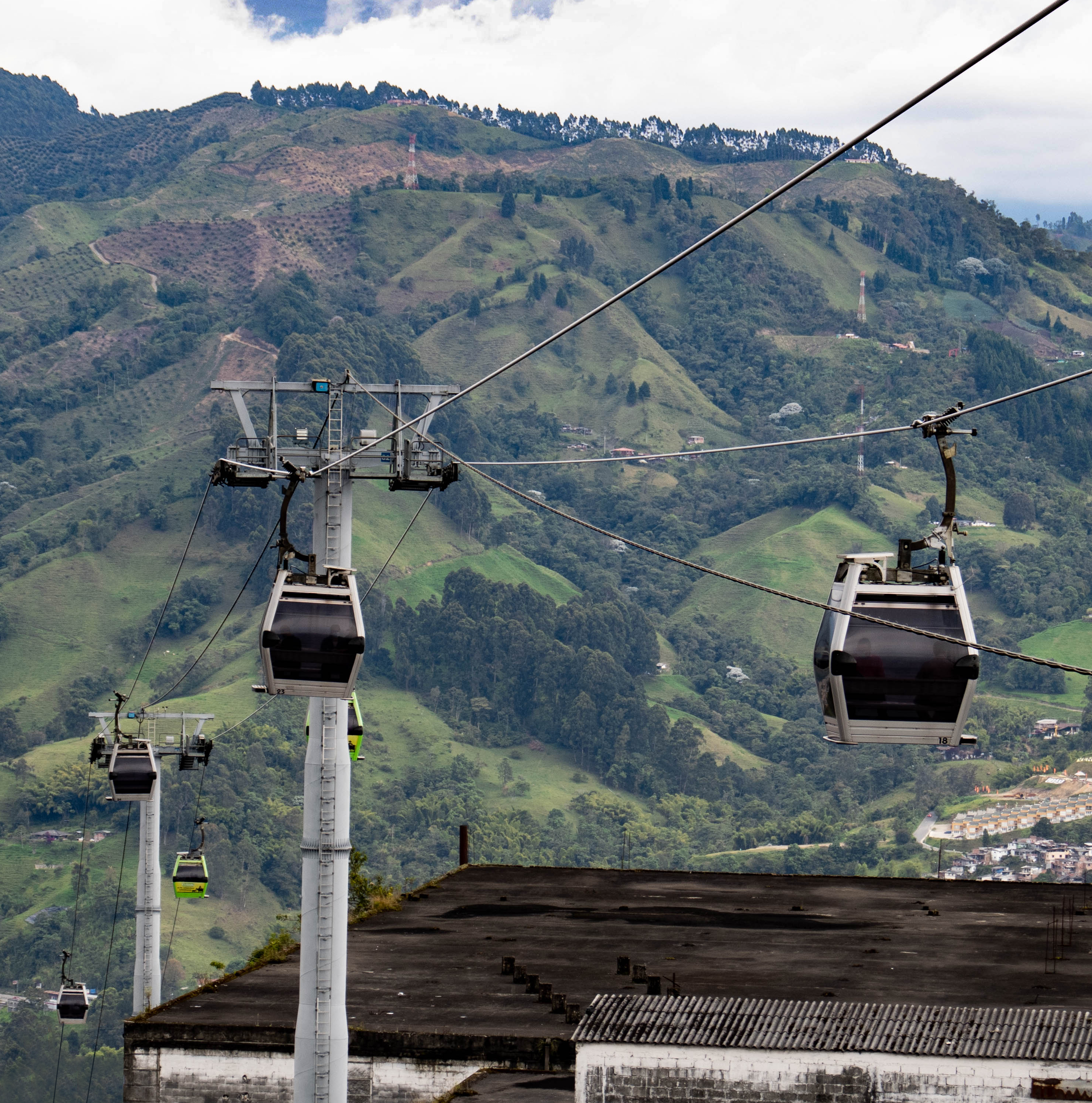
- View of the gondolas

Overview
- Locale: Manizales and Villamaría, Colombia
- Transit type: Gondola lift
- Number of lines: 3
- Line number: Line 1 (Cámbulos-Fundadores), Line 2 (Cámbulos-Villamaría), Line 3 (Cámbulos-El Cable)
- Number of stations: 7
- Annual ridership: 3.95 million (2025)
- Website: cableaereomanizales.gov.co

Operation
- Began operation: October 30, 2009; 17 years ago
- Operator: Infimanizales
- Number of vehicles: 110

Technical
- System length: 5.5 km (3.4 mi)
- Average speed: 5 m/s (16 ft/s)
System map

The Manizales Gondola Lift, known in Spanish as Cable Aéreo Manizales, is a gondola lift system implemented in the cities of Manizales and Villamaría, Colombia for urban public transport.

== Network ==
The network has three operating lines: the original Line 1 and the more recent Line 2 and Line 3. Line 1 follows a north–south direction connecting the centre of Manizales, at Fundadores station, with its bus terminal in Cámbulos station, over a distance of 2 km. Line 2 is a 705 m extension from Cámbulos to Villamaría station, in the centre of this municipality. Line 3 has four stations laid in an east–west direction and connects Cámbulos with El Cable station.

== See also ==
Media related to Cable Aéreo de Manizales at Wikimedia Commons

- List of gondola lifts
