= Mi Teleférico =

Cable car system in La Paz and El Alto, Bolivia

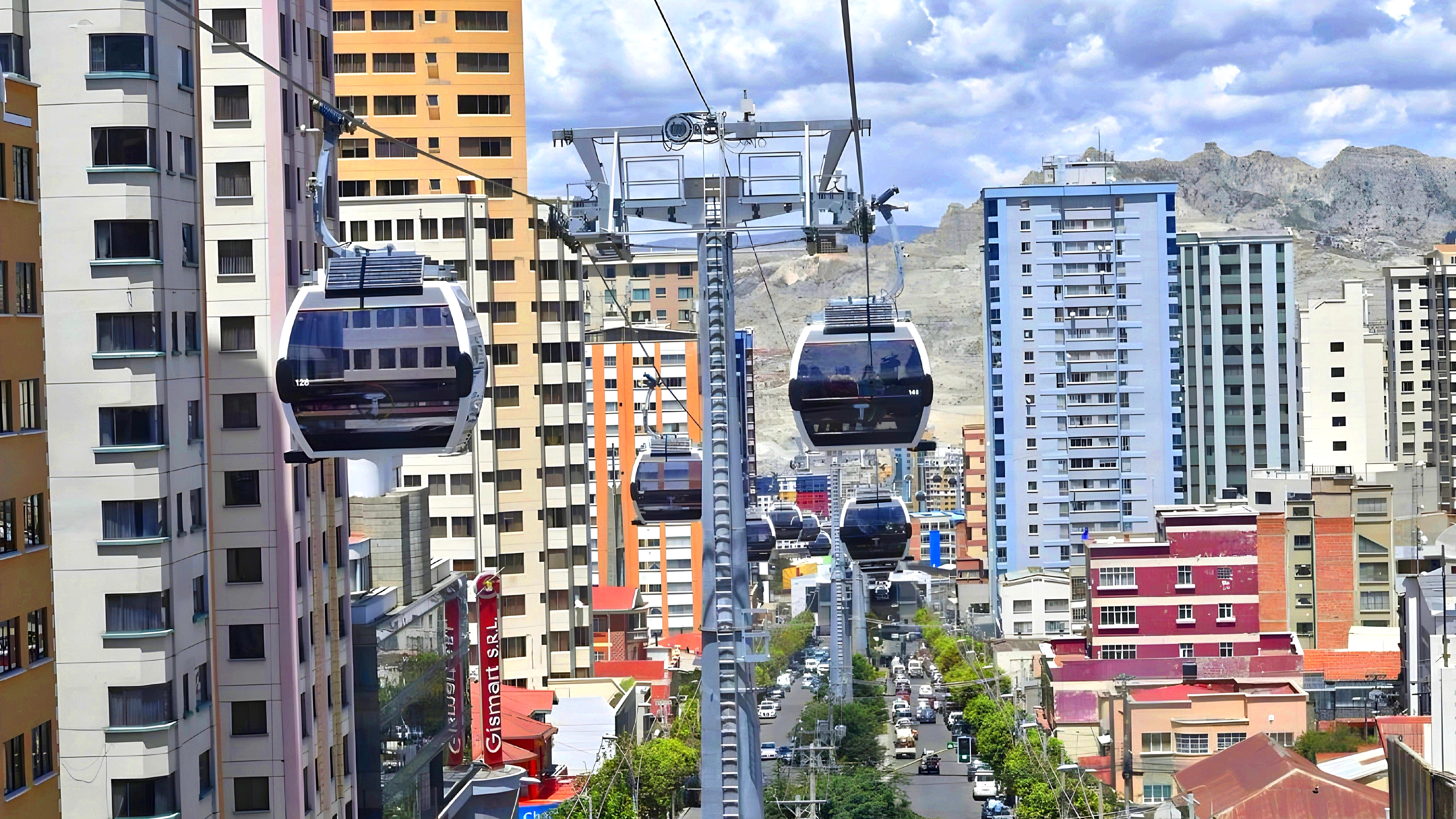
- White Line of Mi Teleférico on Busch Avenue in Miraflores

Overview
- Native name: Mi Teleférico
- Owner: Empresa Estatal de Transporte por Cable "Mi Teleférico"
- Locale: La Paz, Bolivia; 16°30′00″S 68°09′00″W
- Transit type: Gondola lift
- Number of lines: 10 (1 in planning)
- Number of stations: 36 (5 in planning)
- Website: www.miteleferico.bo

Operation
- Began operation: 30 May 2014; 12 years ago
- Operator: Empresa Estatal de Transporte por Cable "Mi Teleférico"
- Number of vehicles: 1398 gondola cars: 10 people each; 109 (Red Line); 169 (Yellow Line); 165 (Green Line); 208 (Blue Line); 127 (Orange Line); 131 (White Line); 155 (Sky Blue Line); 190 (Purple Line); 27 (Brown Line); 117 (Silver Line); 106 (Gold Line)
- Headway: 12 sec

Technical
- System length: 19.0 mi (30.6 km)
- Average speed: 11.2 mph (18.0 km/h)
- Top speed: 13.4 mph (21.6 km/h)
System map

Mi Teleférico (Spanish pronunciation: [mi teleˈfeɾiko], English: My Cable Car), also known as Teleférico La Paz–El Alto (La Paz–El Alto Cable Car), is an aerial cable car urban transit system serving the La Paz–El Alto metropolitan area in Bolivia. As of October 2019, the system consists of 26 stations (36 if transfer stations are counted separately per line) along ten lines: Red, Yellow, Green, Blue, Orange, White, Sky Blue, Purple, Brown, and Silver. Further lines and extensions are in planning or construction. The system is the longest aerial cable car system in the world.

Based on its master plan, the completed system, which is being built by the Doppelmayr Garaventa Group, is intended to reach a length of 33.8 km (21.0 mi) with 11 lines and 30 stations. While other urban transit cable cars like Medellín's Metrocable complement existing rapid transit systems, Mi Teleférico is the first system to use cable cars as the backbone of the urban transit network. In 2018, Mi Teleférico won a Latam Smart City Award in the category of "Sustainable urban development and mobility".

Mi Teleférico was planned in order to address a number of problems, including a precarious public transit system that could not cope with growing user demands, the high cost in time and money of traveling between La Paz and El Alto, chaotic traffic with its subsequent environmental and noise pollution, and a growing demand for gasoline and diesel fuel, which are subsidized by the state. The Red, Yellow, and Purple lines connect the neighboring cities of La Paz and El Alto, which are separated by a steep slope about 400 m (1,300 ft) tall, and which were previously only connected by winding, congested roads.

== History ==
=== Background ===
The neighboring cities of El Alto and La Paz are the second and third most populous cities in Bolivia. Despite their proximity, travel between the two has always been a challenge, due to a difference in elevation of about 400 m (1,300 ft). La Paz, the administrative center of Bolivia, is located in a canyon on the Choqueyapu River, while El Alto, a poorer but growing city with a majority indigenous population, is located above it on the Altiplano plateau. Prior to the construction of the cable car, travel between La Paz and El Alto was limited to heavily crowded, winding streets, and the only public transit consisted of buses and minibuses that often got stuck in traffic. In order to alleviate this situation, the idea of connecting the two cities with a cable car has been proposed several times since the 1970s.

In the 1970s, a team planned an aerial cable car route connecting the neighborhoods of La Ceja in El Alto and La Florida in La Paz.

In 1990, a feasibility study was undertaken for a cable car between La Ceja in El Alto and the Plaza de San Francisco in La Paz. The most controversial aspects of the plan were the fare, the low passenger capacity, and ultimately the proximity to the Basilica of San Francisco. During the 1991 municipal elections, the Conciencia de Patria (CONDEPA) party candidate argued against a cable car, claiming it would cost minibus drivers their livelihoods and impact privacy.

In the 1993 municipal elections, mayoral candidate Mónica Medina, also of the CONDEPA party, made aerial transit one of her campaign promises, modifying the original idea of a single line into a system of interconnected cable car lines with a hub on Lainkakota hill.

In 2003, the project returned to the table, but details such as tower placement stalled the work. The planned San Francisco terminal was moved to the Zapata soccer field near the Higher University of San Andrés, but the idea was still too controversial to move ahead.

In 2011, the Municipal Government of La Paz carried out a study on potential ridership demand, and found that the city handles 1.7 million trips per day, including 350,000 trips between La Paz and El Alto.

=== Phase One ===
In July 2012, Bolivian President Evo Morales Ayma drafted a bill for the construction of a cable car to connect El Alto with the center and south of La Paz and sent it to the Plurinational Legislative Assembly. Morales called together the mayor of La Paz, Luis Revilla, the mayor of El Alto, Édgar Patana, and the governor of the La Paz Department, César Cocarico, to participate in the project. The project was financed by the country's National Treasury with an internal loan from the Central Bank of Bolivia.

The Doppelmayr/Garaventa Group was awarded a contract to design the cable car system as well as being a general contractor for the project. They were a turnkey contractor for the project and required to train local staff for operations and maintenance.

In December 2012, Law 332 was passed to allow the Ministry of Public Works, Services, and Housing to perform eminent domain for land needed to construct the cable car.

The system's Phase One consisted of the Red Line (Línea Roja), Yellow Line (Línea Amarilla), and Green Line (Línea Verde), which are also the colors of the Bolivian flag. Phase One was inaugurated and began operation on 30 May 2014.

=== Phase Two ===
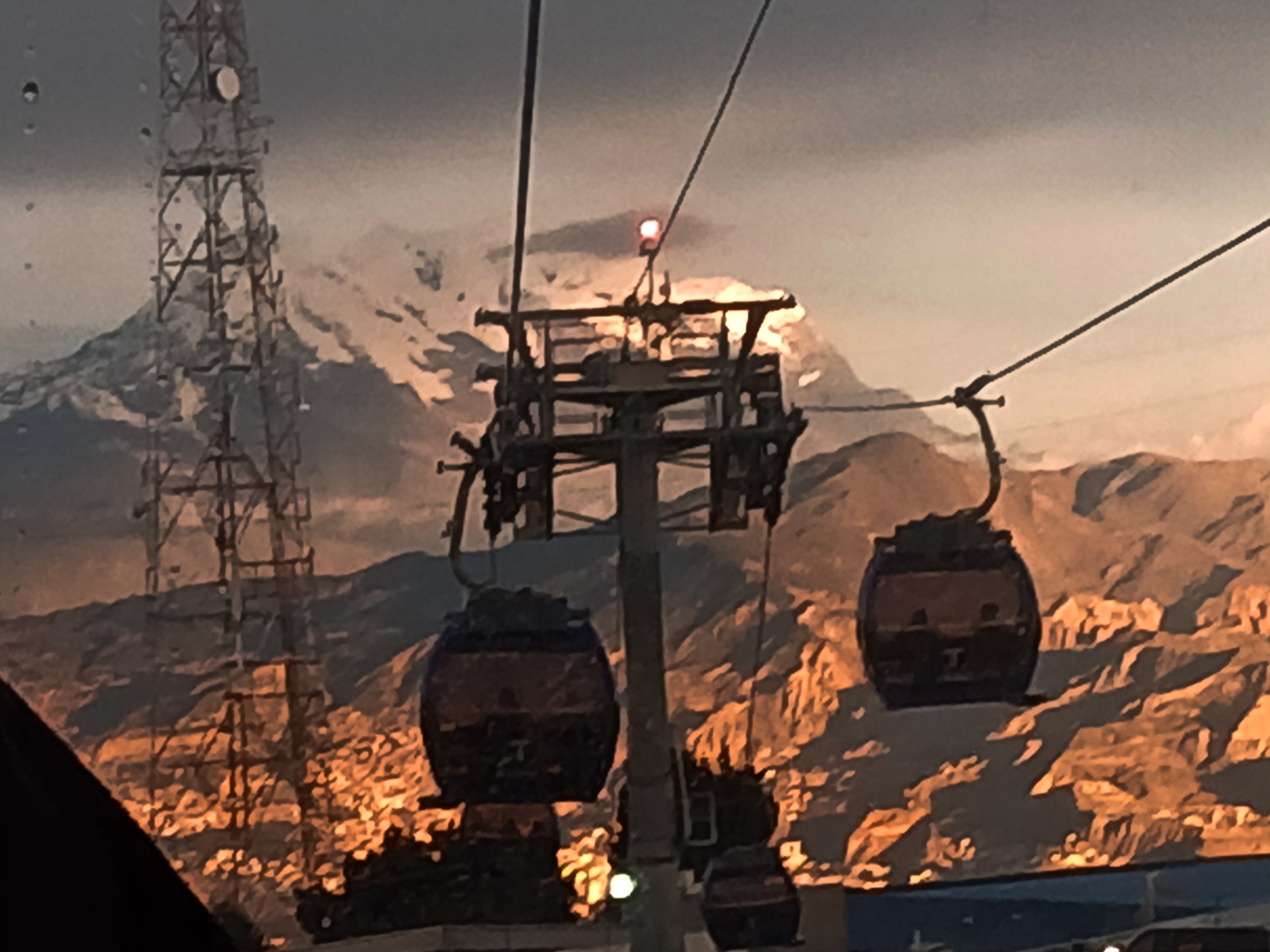
The blue line with Illimani in the background

On 1 July 2014, Evo Morales announced five new interconnected lines to be built in the coming years. On 26 January 2015, Law 652 was passed, permitting construction of Phase Two and increasing the number of new lines to six and committing US $450 million to the project. A seventh line was announced in February 2016, and an eighth was announced in July 2016. Phase Two extended the system by over 20 km (12 mi). On 13 July 2017, it was announced that the cost of Phase 2 would be increased to US $506 million.

Phase Two began operation in 2017 with the inauguration of the Blue Line (Línea Azul) on 3 March 2017, followed by the Orange Line (Línea Naranja) on 29 September 2017. On 24 March 2018, the White Line (Línea Blanca) and the first section of the Sky Blue Line (Línea Celeste) were opened. The second and final section of the Sky Blue Line was opened on 14 July 2018. The remaining five lines will be the Purple Line (Línea Morada), the Brown Line (Línea Café), the Silver Line (Línea Plateada), and the Gold Line (Línea Dorada).

The Purple Line (Línea Morada) opened on 28 September 2018, followed by the Silver Line (Línea Plateada) on 9 March 2019.

=== Other cities ===
==== Oruro ====
Mi Teleférico contributed to the construction of the Teleférico Santuario Virgen del Socavón Teleférico Turístico "Virgen del Socavón" (Our Lady of the Mines Tourist Cable Car) in Oruro, Bolivia. The cable car connects the city center to the Virgen del Socavón statue and shrine on nearby Santa Bárbara hill, which plays an important role in the city's carnaval celebrations. The cable car, which opened on 7 February 2018, consists of a single 800-metre (2,600 ft) line with two stations and 16 cars. It has a capacity of 1000 passengers per hour, and a one-way trip takes approximately 3 minutes. The project was originally due to open in November 2016, but it suffered repeated delays until Mi Teleférico took over construction work in 2017.

==== Sucre ====
As of 2017, the Empresa Estatal de Transporte por Cable "Mi Teleférico" was in the process of planning a cable car system for the city of Sucre (Sucre Cable Car, Teleférico para Sucre).

== Impact ==
The cable car system has benefited the region by significantly reducing the time spent on transportation. It has caused a shift to public transportation and increased employment opportunities for the region. A journey from El Alto to the center of La Paz is about three times faster on the Teleférico compared to taking a bus or taxi.

== Lines ==
=== Lines in operation ===
The Mi Teleférico system consists of monocable aerial cable car lines. Most lines have a maximum capacity of 3000 passengers per hour, while the Sky Blue Line has a capacity of 4000 passengers per hour. The network has a total of seven lines, with 443 cars on the Red, Green, and Yellow Lines, 208 on the Blue Line, 127 on the Orange Line, 131 on the White Line, and 155 on the Sky Blue Line. Each car seats 10 passengers. Cars depart every 12 seconds, and the network is open 17 hours a day.

According to Mi Teleférico, the Red, Yellow, and Green Lines combined transport between 80,000 and 90,000 passengers per day. Of these, the Yellow and Red Lines, the two lines that link La Paz and El Alto, account for some 70,000 rides. During its opening week, the Blue Line moved 41,000 passengers in one day, and it has increased ridership on the Red Line by 15%.

Line	Terminus stations	Length	Travel time	Stations	Cabins	Capacity	Speed	Towers	Opened
Red Line	16 de Julio/Jach'a Qhathu – Estación Central/Taypi Uta	2.4 km (1.5 mi)	10 min	3	109	3000 pphpd	5 m/s	19	30 May 2014
Yellow Line	Mirador/Qhana Pata – Chuqui Apu/Libertador	3.9 km (2.4 mi)	13.5 min	4	169	3000 pphpd	5 m/s	31	15 September 2014
Green Line	Chuqui Apu/Libertador – Irpawi/Irpavi	3.7 km (2.3 mi)	16.6 min	4	165	3000 pphpd	5 m/s	27	4 December 2014
Blue Line	Rio Seco/Waña Jawira – 16 de Julio/Jach'a Qhathu	4.7 km (2.9 mi)	17 min	5	208	3000 pphpd	5 m/s	38	3 March 2017
Orange Line	Estación Central/Taypi Uta – Héroes de la Revolución/Villarroel	2.6 km (1.6 mi)	10 min	4	127	3000 pphpd	5 m/s	26	29 September 2017
White Line	Plaza Villarroel – San Jorge	2.9 km (1.8 mi)	13.1 min	4	131	3000 pphpd	5 m/s	26	24 March 2018
Sky Blue Line	El Prado – Chuqui Apu/Libertador	2.6 km (1.6 mi)	11.8 min	4	155	4000 pphpd	6 m/s	26	Section 1: 24 March 2018; Complete Line: 14 July 2018
Purple Line	6 de Marzo – San Jose	4.3 km (2.7 mi)	16.2 min	3	190	4000 pphpd	6 m/s	34	28 September 2018
Brown Line	Monumento Busch – Las Villas	0.7 km (0.43 mi)	3.8 min	2	27	2000 pphpd	5 m/s	7	20 December 2018
Silver Line	16 de Julio/Jach'a Qhathu – Mirador/Qhana Pata	2.6 km (1.6 mi)	11.7 min	3	117	3000 pphpd	5 m/s	21	9 March 2019

=== Future lines ===
Line	Terminus stations	Length	Travel time	Stations	Cabins	Capacity	Speed	Towers	Planned opening
Gold Line	Irpawi/Irpavi – Cota Cota	2.2 km (1.4 mi)	7.6 min	3	106	3000 pphpd	5 m/s		2020

== Stations ==
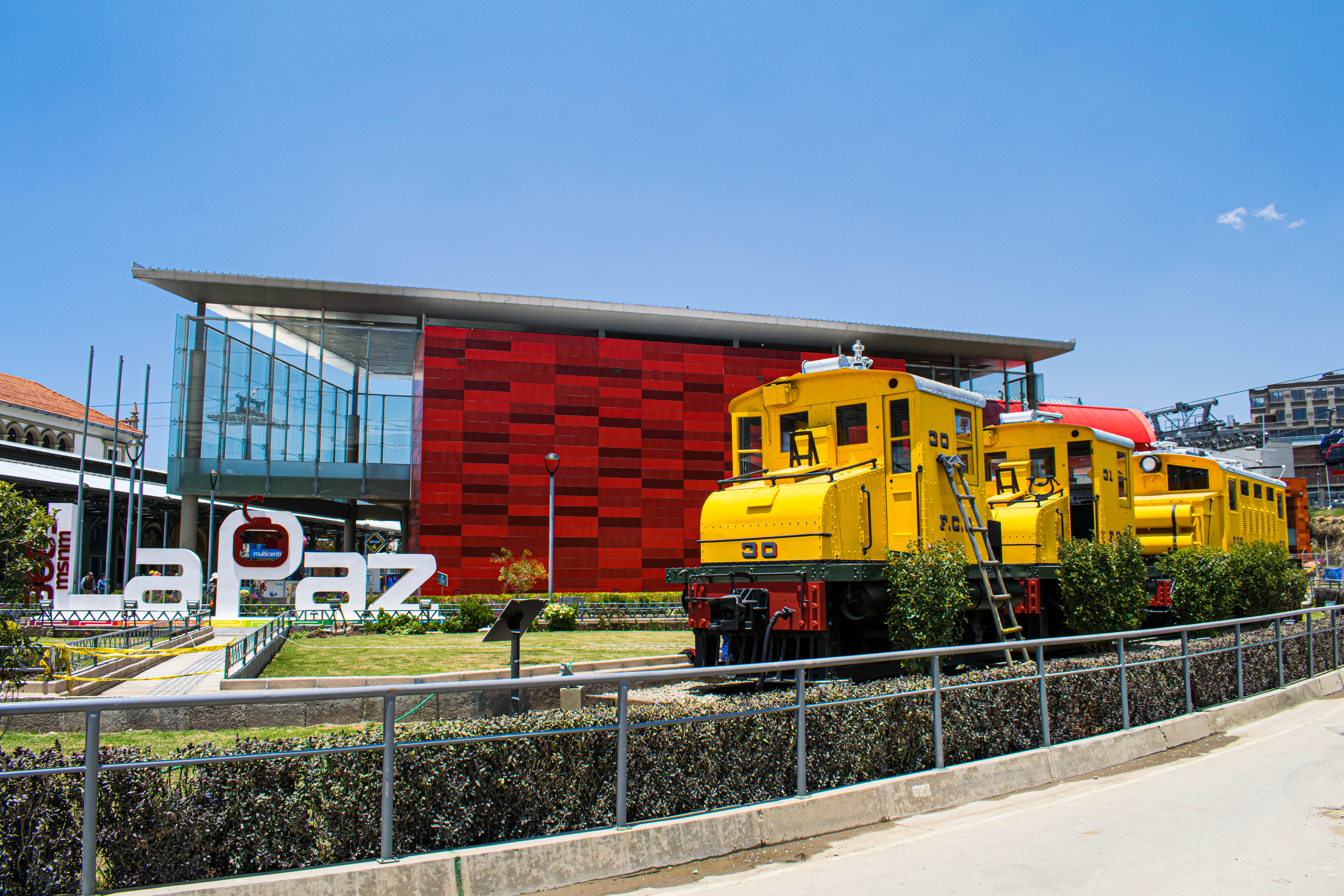
Estación Central (central station) on the red line in El Alto.

All stations have both a Spanish name and an Aymara name.

=== Red Line (Línea Roja) ===
Aymara name	Spanish name	Connections	City	Notes
Taypi Uta	Estación Central	Orange Line	La Paz	former central railway station
Ajayuni	Cementerio		La Paz	main cemetery
Jach'a Qhathu	16 de julio	Blue and Silver Lines	El Alto	

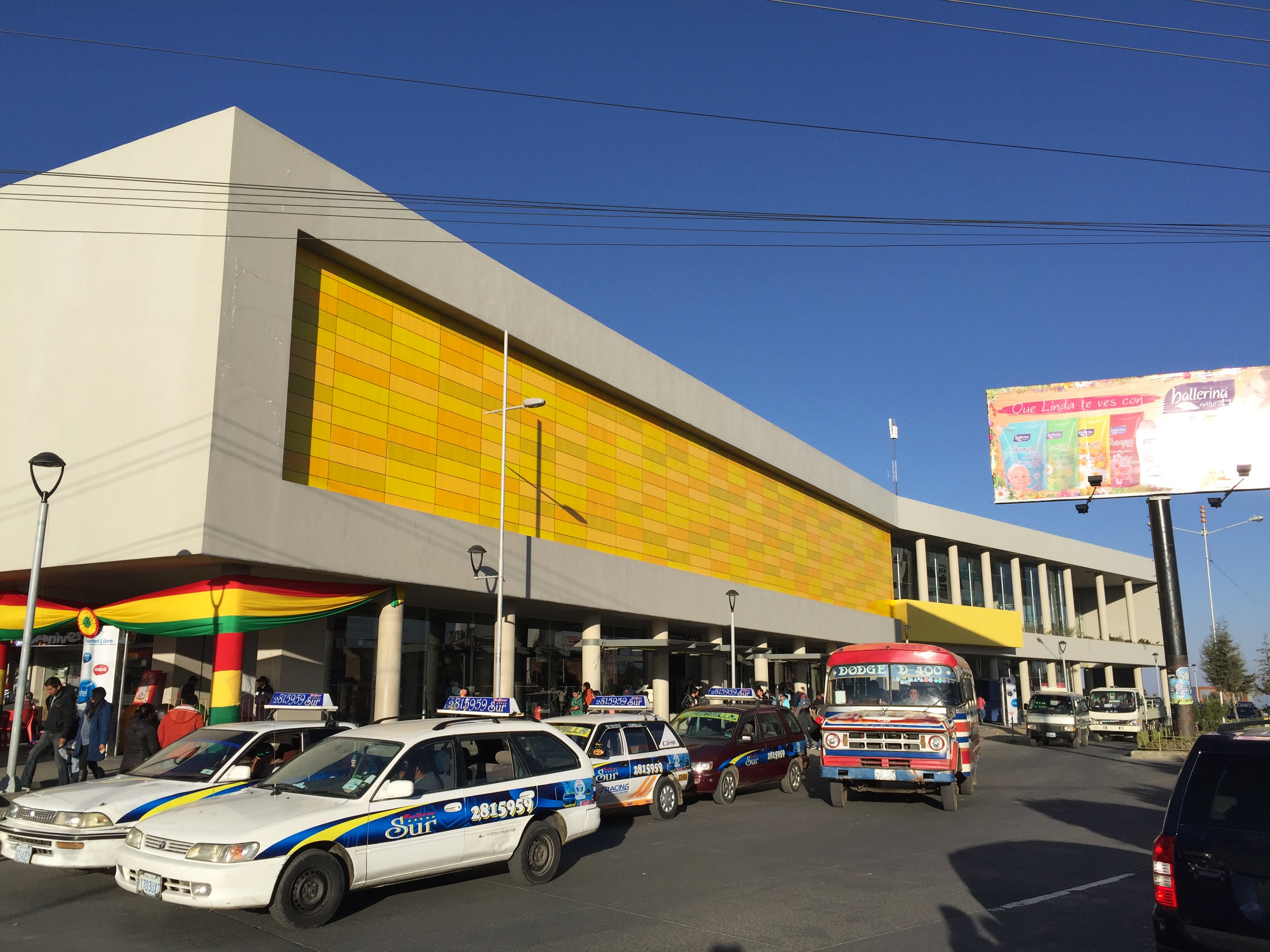
Ciudad Satélite station on the yellow line in El Alto.

=== Yellow Line (Línea Amarilla) ===
Aymara name	Spanish name	Connections	City	Notes
Chuqui Apu	Libertador	Green and Sky Blue Lines	La Paz	Alternative spelling used in-station: Chuqi Apu
Suphu Kachi	Sopocachi		La Paz	
Quta Uma	Buenos Aires		La Paz	
Qhana Pata	Mirador	Silver Line	El Alto	

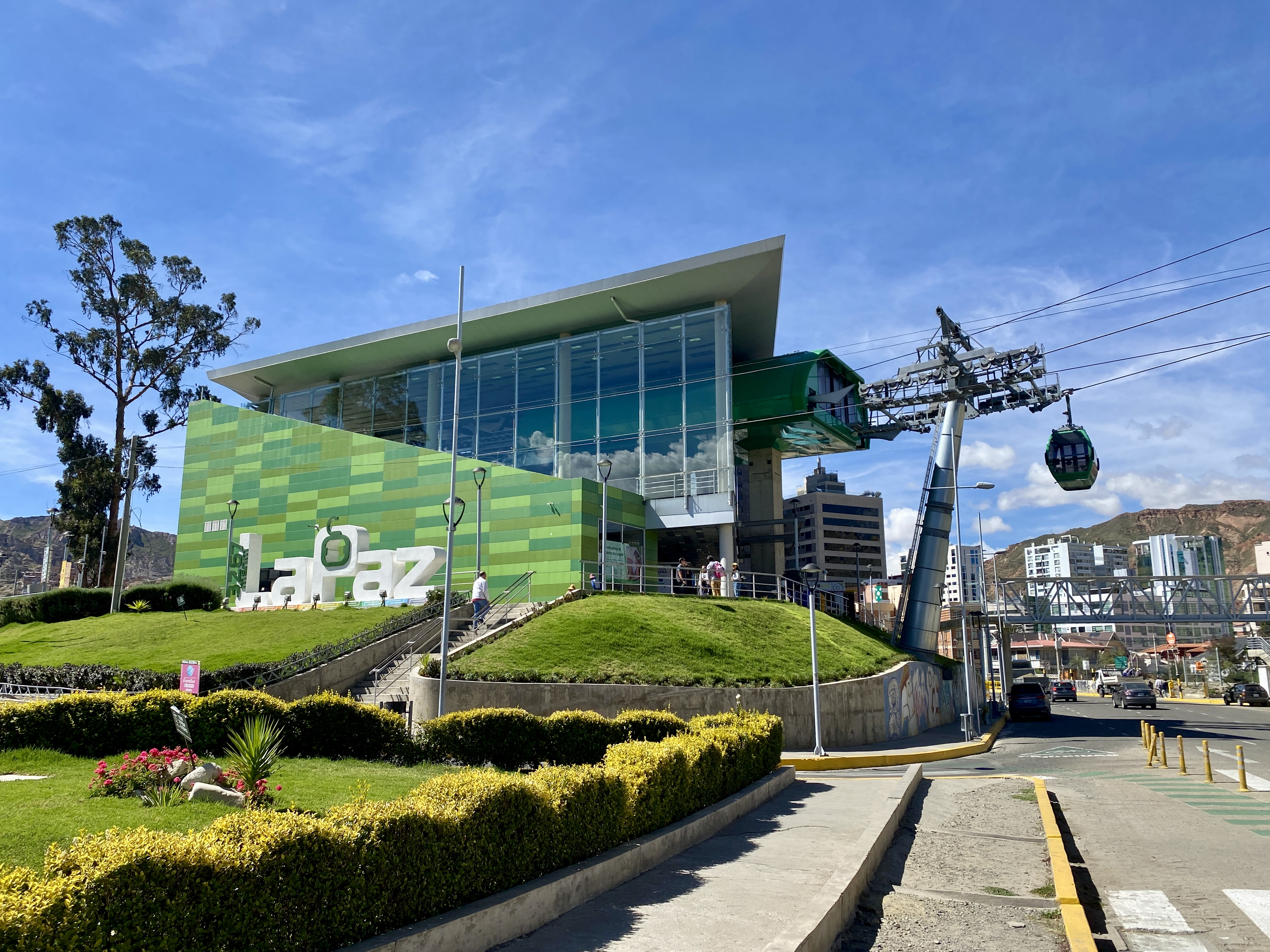
Irpavi station on the green line

=== Green Line (Línea Verde) ===
Aymara name	Spanish name	Connections	City	Notes
Irpawi	Irpavi	Gold Line (2020)	La Paz	
Aynacha Obrajes	Obrajes		La Paz	a free funicular provides access from Calle 17 to the station
Pata Obrajes	Alto Obrajes		La Paz	
Chuqui Apu	Libertador	Yellow and Sky Blue Lines	La Paz	

=== Blue Line (Línea Azul) ===
Aymara name	Spanish name	Connections	City	Notes
Jach'a Qhathu	16 de julio	Red and Silver Lines	El Alto	
Qhana Thaki	Plaza Libertad		El Alto	
Suma Qamaña	Plaza La Paz		El Alto	
Yatina Uta	UPEA		El Alto	Universidad Pública de El Alto
Waña Jawira	Río Seco		El Alto	

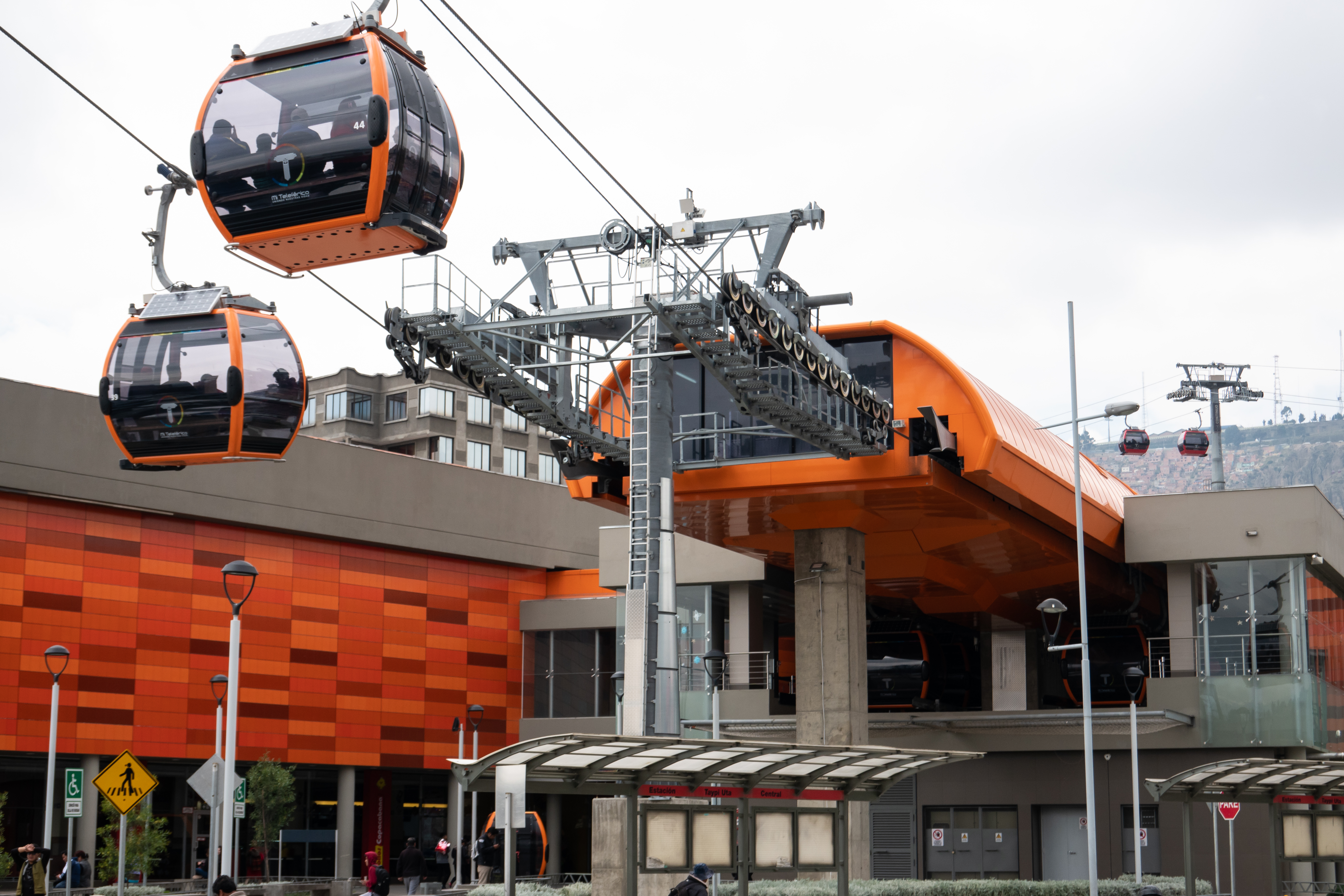
Central station on the orange line

=== Orange Line (Línea Naranja) ===
Aymara name	Spanish name	Connections	City	Notes
Taypi Uta	Estación Central	Red Line	La Paz	former central railway station
Riosinho Pampa	Armentia		La Paz	
Apachita	Periférica		La Paz	
Inalmama	Plaza Villarroel	White Line	La Paz	underground station

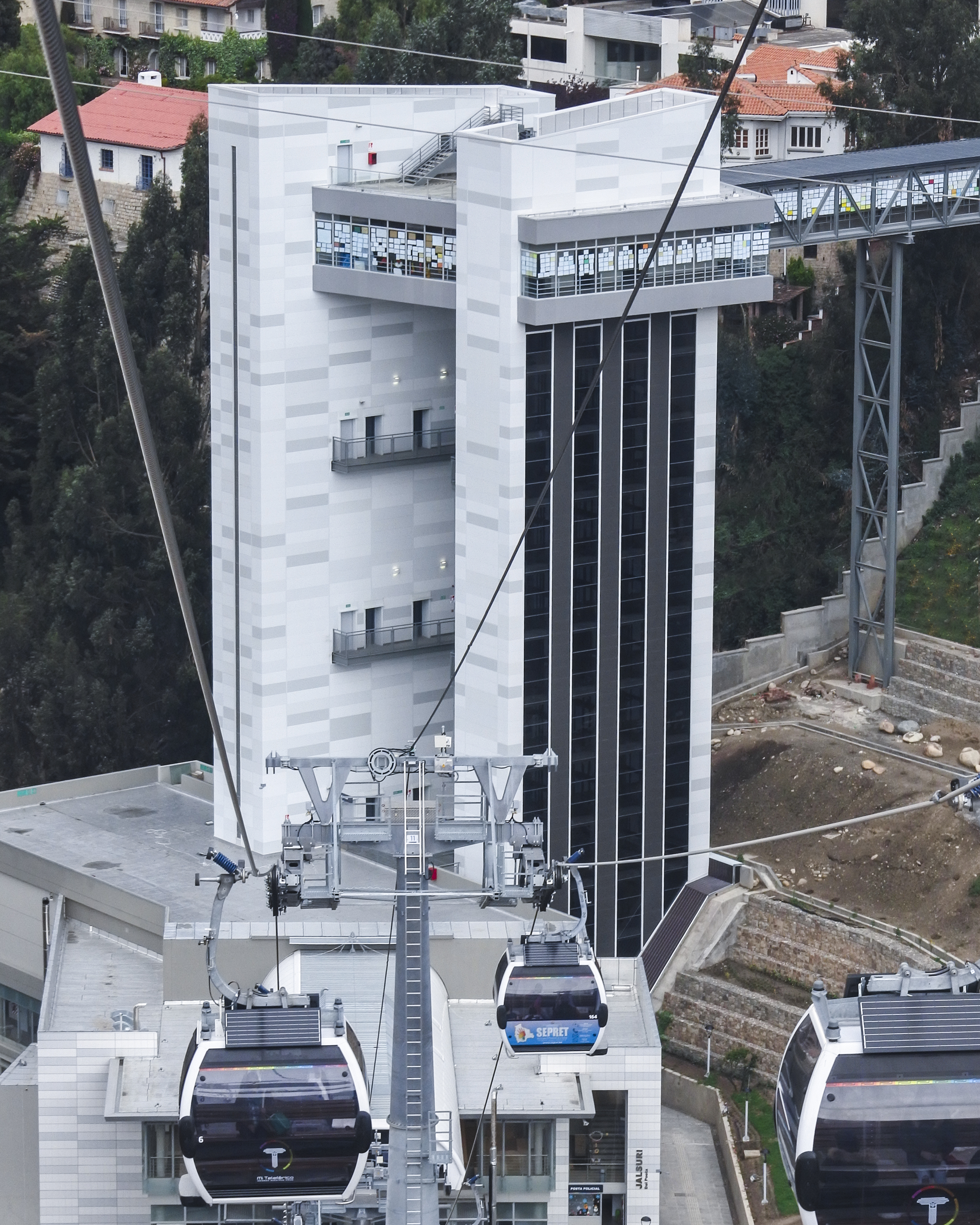
San Jorge Station on the white line

=== White Line (Línea Blanca) ===
Aymara name	Spanish name	Connections	City	Notes
Jalsuri	San Jorge	Sky Blue Line	La Paz	
Kimsachata	Triangular		La Paz	
Qhuirwa Uma	Monumento a Busch	Brown Line	La Paz	
Inalmama	Plaza Villarroel	Orange Line	La Paz	underground station

=== Sky Blue Line (Línea Celeste) ===
Aymara name	Spanish name	Connections	City	Notes
Chuqui Apu	Libertador	Yellow and Green Lines	La Paz	
Chukiya Marka	Avenida Poeta	White Line	La Paz	
Layqa Quta	Teatro al Aire Libre		La Paz	
Chukiya Marka	Prado		La Paz	

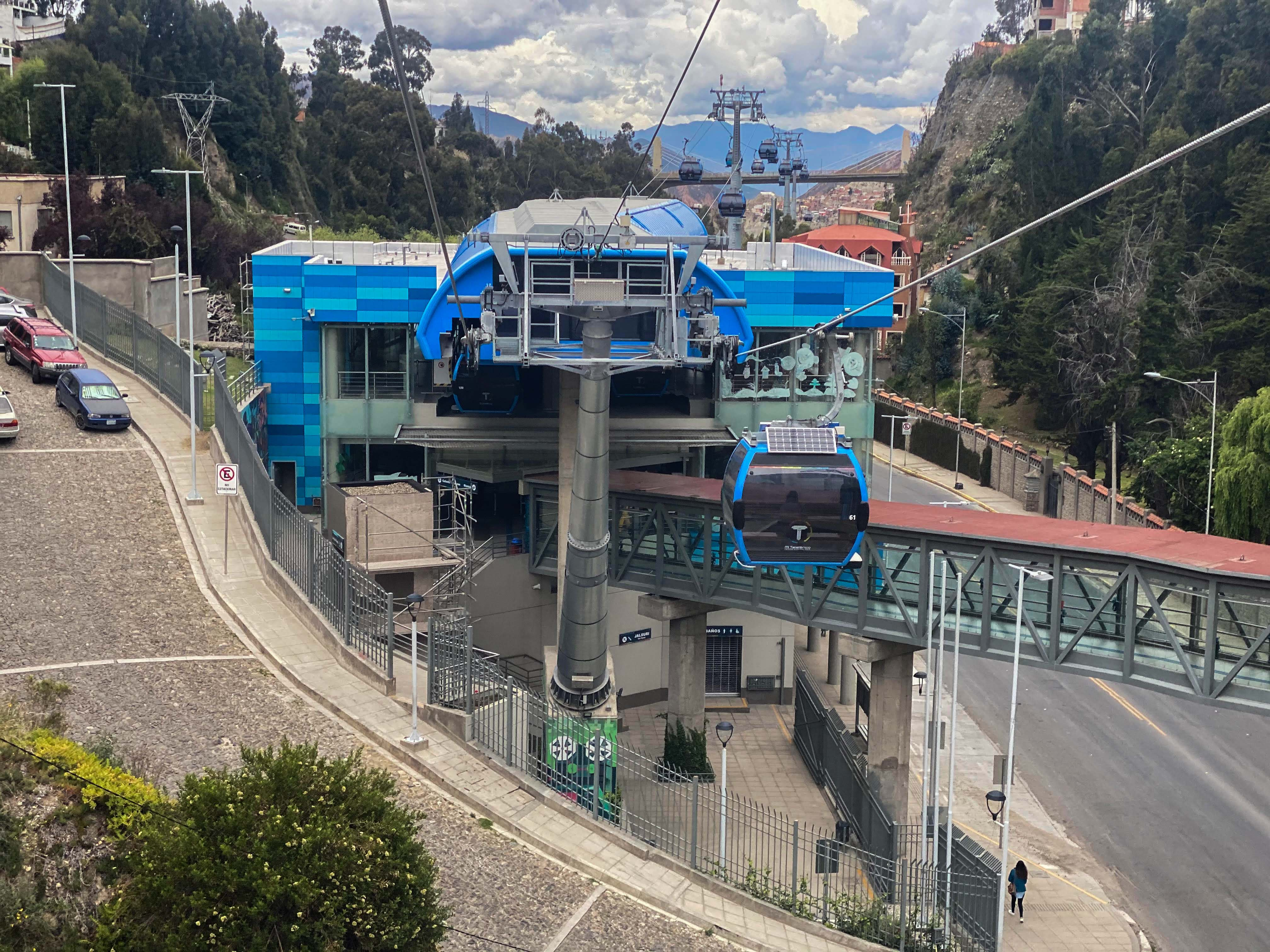
Avenida del Poeta Station on the light blue line

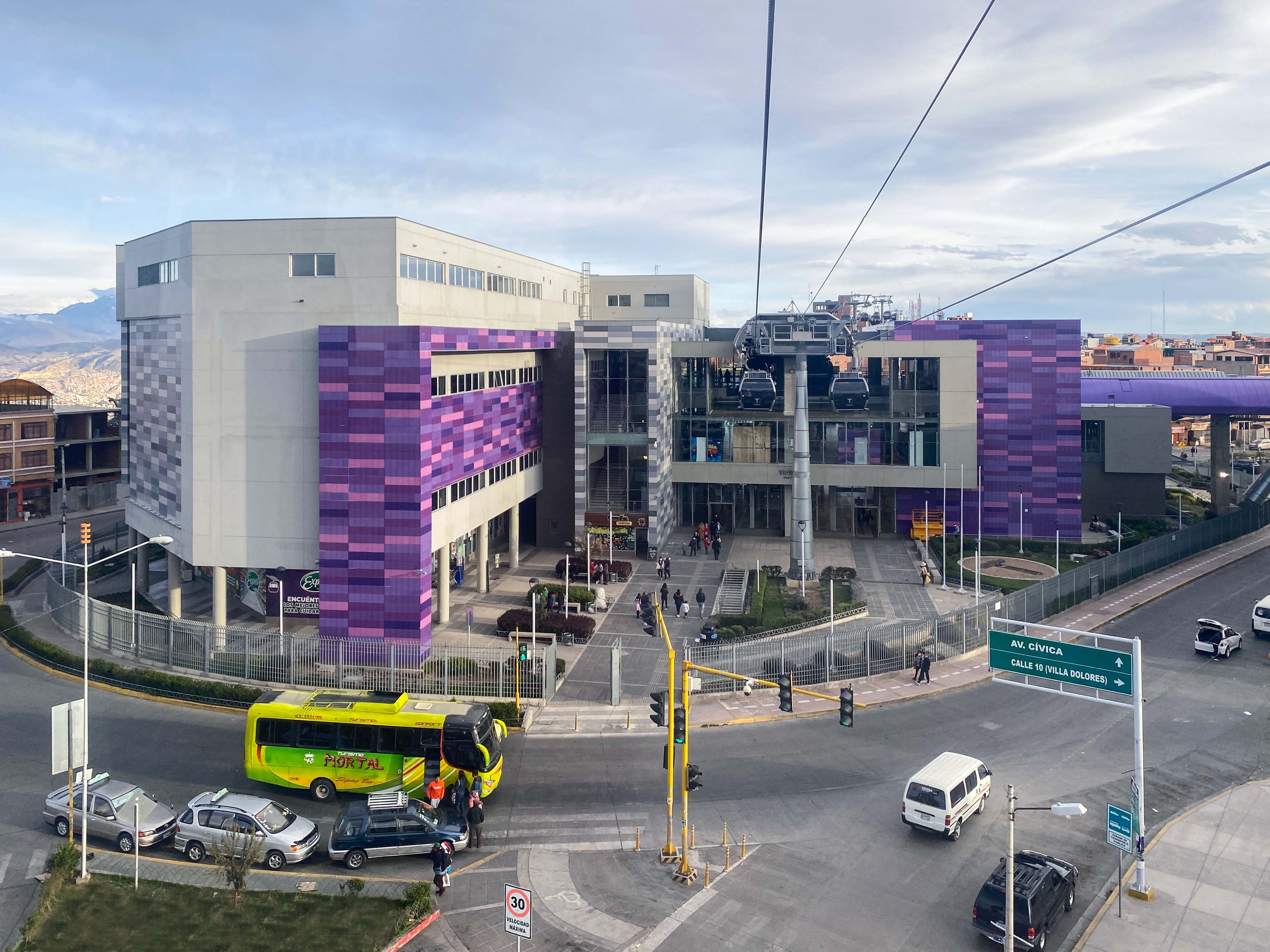
Tiquira Station terminus on the purple line in El Alto

=== Purple Line (Línea Morada) ===
Aymara name	Spanish name	Connections	City	Notes
Utjawi	San José		La Paz	
Tiquira	Faro Murillo	Silver Line	El Alto	
Jach'a Thaki	Avenida 6 de Marzo		El Alto	

=== Brown Line (Línea Café) ===
Aymara name	Spanish name	Connections	City	Notes
Qhuirwa Uma	Monumento a Busch	White Line	La Paz	
Palla Thaki	Las Villas		La Paz	

=== Silver Line (Línea Plateada) ===
Aymara name	Spanish name	Connections	City	Notes
Jach'a Qhathu	16 de julio	Red and Blue Lines	El Alto	
Tiquira	Complejo de Integración Faro Murillo	Purple Line	El Alto	
Qhana Pata	Mirador	Yellow Line	El Alto	

=== Gold Line (Línea Dorada) ===
Aymara name	Spanish name	Connections	City	Notes
Irpawi	Irpavi	Green Line	La Paz	
Achumani	Achumani		La Paz	
Cota Cota	Cota Cota		La Paz	

== Incidents ==
On February 14, 2015, a eucalyptus tree fell, striking an empty cabin on the Yellow Line, dislodging the cable and leaving passengers stranded for three hours. Nineteen passengers suffered bruises and other minor injuries, but there were no major injuries, and only minor damage to three cabins.

On May 9, 2016, a tower from the construction of the Blue Line fell, with nine injured and no deaths.

== Intermodal transfers ==
Beginning in December 2014, the Mi Teleférico and La Paz Bus systems began allowing passenger transfers at Chuqui Apu station.

== Mobile application ==
Mi Teleférico has released a mobile application for Android and iOS with information about existing and future lines.
