= Metrocable (Medellín) =

First urban transit cablecar

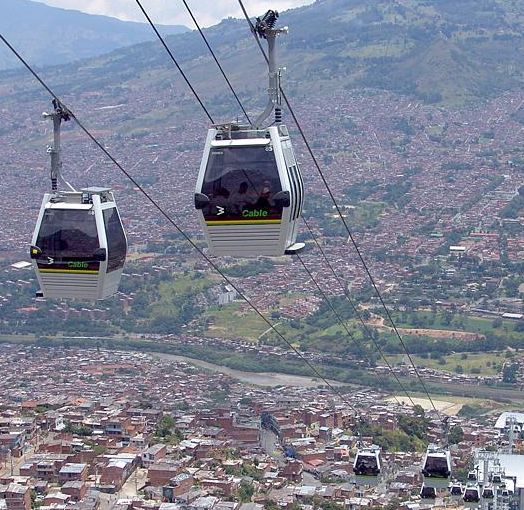

Overview
- Locale: Medellín, Colombia
- Transit type: Gondola lift
- Number of lines: 6
- Line number: (Acevedo-Santo Domingo) (San Javier-La Aurora) (Santo Domingo-Arví) (Oriente-Villa Sierra) (Miraflores-Trece de Noviembre) (Acevedo-El Progreso)
- Number of stations: 20
- Annual ridership: 22.5 million (2025)

Operation
- Began operation: 2004 (Line K)
- Operator: Medellín Metro
- Number of vehicles: 499

Technical
- System length: 14.62 km (9.08 mi)
- Average speed: 18 km/h (11 mph)

Metrocable is a gondola lift system implemented by the City Council of Medellín, Colombia, with the purpose of providing a transportation service that complements the Medellín Metro. It was designed to reach some of the city's informal settlements on the steep hills that mark its topography. It is largely considered to be the first cable-propelled urban transit system in South America. The transportation infrastructure has been in service since 2004.

For some decades before its inception, there were plans for some form of transportation that took into account the challenging topography of the region. These ideas date back to the use of cable-car technology for exporting coffee (Manizales - Mariquita Cableway) starting in the 1930s between the city of Manizales, south of Medellín, and the Cauca River 2,000 metres (6,600 ft) below. In its modern incarnation, Metrocable was the result of a joint effort between the city's elected mayor, Luis Pérez Gutiérrez, and the Metro Company. For some, the initial conception of the system was indirectly inspired by the Caracas Aerial Tramway (also known as the Mount Avila Gondola), which was designed in the 1950s primarily to carry passengers to a luxury hotel.

Line K of the Metrocable, connecting the Medellín River valley to the steep hills in comunas (districts) 1 and 2, was the first system in the world dedicated to public transport, with a fixed service schedule. Since starting operations in 2004, it carries 30,000 people daily and is operationally integrated into the rest of Medellín's mass transit system (SITVA), which includes the overground Metro, the bus rapid transit system (BRT), and a tramway line (opened in 2016).

As of 2021, the Medellín Metrocable system has six lines: Line H, Line J, Line K, Line L (Cable Arvi), Line M, and Line P. Overall, the system has been received with enthusiasm by locals, who are mainly low-income users and are prepared to queue for up to 45 minutes at peak times to use it. There are a rapidly growing number of similar systems in other cities in Latin America (such as Metrocable (Caracas), Mi Teleférico (La Paz), Manizales, MIO Cable (Cali), TransMiCable (Bogotá), Mexicable near Mexico City) and elsewhere.

== Description ==
Medellín is located in the Aburrá Valley and surrounded by hills. Many of these hills are home to underdeveloped barrios (asentamientos informales), which due to their location cannot be reached by Medellín's Metro mass transportation system. Many of these barrios are located on very steep grounds to the extent that not even a regular bus system would be either useful or commercially profitable. Before the implementation of the Metrocable Line K, residents of the Santo Domingo Savio barrio spent upwards of 2 1/2 hours commuting to work each way.

The Metrocable system is a branch of Medellín's metro and it is managed by the corporation Metro of Medellín. It uses Monocable Detachable Gondola technology, which consists of cable cars connected to a fixed cable through a detachable grip. The haulage cable is pulled by large wheels allowing the cabins to move at an average speed of 10 miles per hour (16 km/h). The system was built by the French company Poma.

== Routes ==
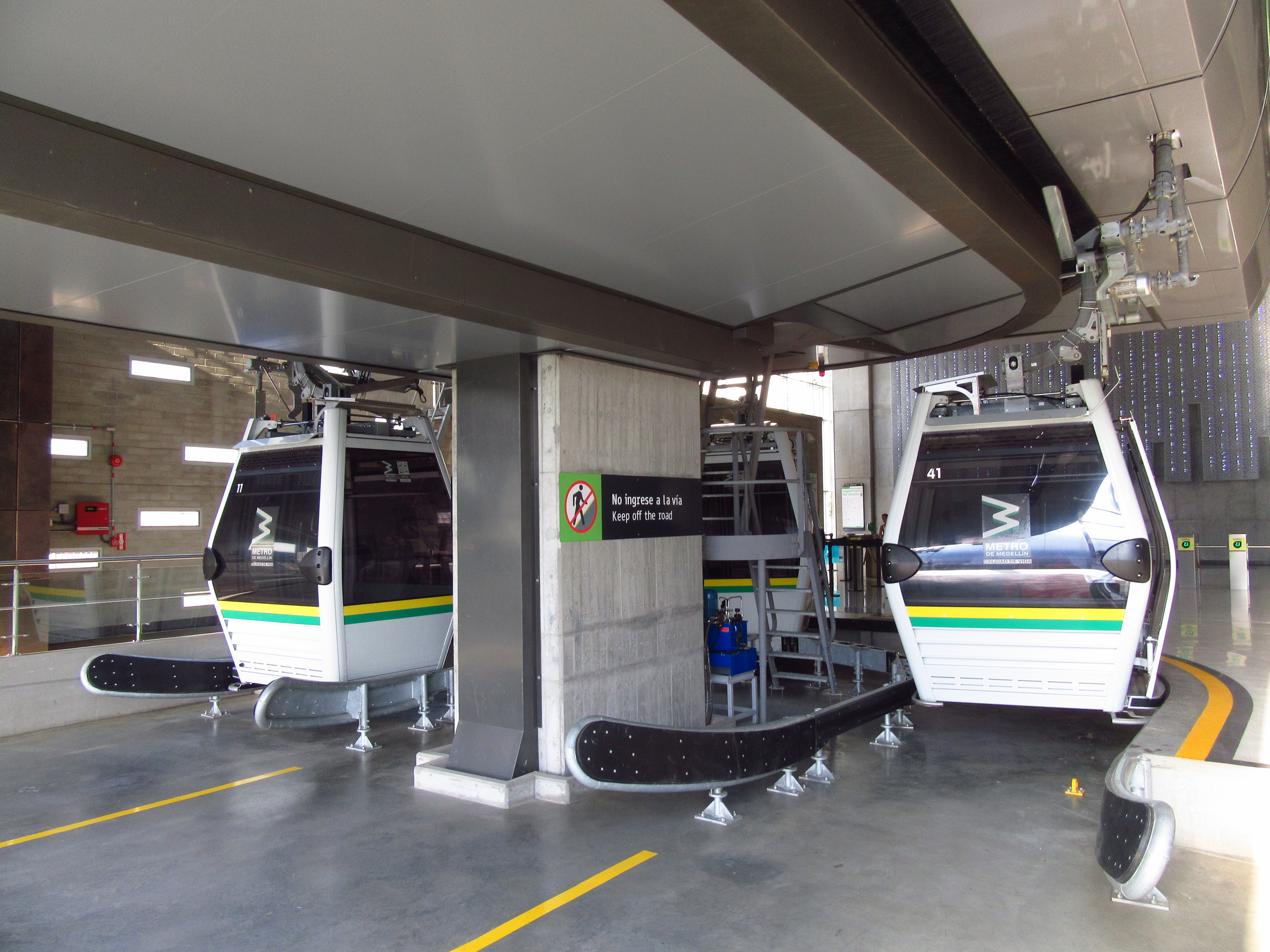
Villa Sierra station, the eastern terminus of the H Line.

As of 2021, six Metrocable lines were operational: Line H, Line J, Line K, Line L, Line M, and Line P.

=== Line K ===
Line K was the first line that was built, opened in 2004. It has a length of 2.07 km and four stations: Acevedo, Andalucia, Popular, and Santo Domingo. The construction cost was estimated at $26 million USD.

On the morning of June 26, 2024, a cable car became stuck, causing a collision between two cars where a car carrying ten passengers fell from a height of six meters. Only minor injuries were sustained, and 90 passengers were stuck waiting to be safely rescued.

=== Line J ===
Soon after officials saw the enormous success of Line K, plans to proceed with another line, Line J, were put on the table. The line officially opened in 2008. Like Line K, it has four stations: San Javier, Juan XXIII, Vallejuelos, and La Aurora. The length of Line J is 2.7 km.

=== Line L ===
Line L does not serve communal areas; rather, it is a tourist-oriented line, connected to Arví Park and part of a social project to bring retreats and nature to the masses. Passengers must pay an extra fare of 12,500 Colombian pesos (approximately $2.50 USD) to ride the line one way.

The line is connected to Line K's terminus station, Santo Domingo. The line was also expected to promote and develop tourism in the rural areas around Lake Guarne. It takes 15 minutes to ascend to El Tambo, and there are no intermediate stations.

=== Line H ===
Line H was opened in 2016. It has a length of 1.4 km and three stations: Oriente, Las Torres and Villa Sierra. The demand is estimated at 1,800 passengers per hour (compared with 3,000 for Line K). At Oriente station, it connects to the Ayacucho Tram line, which in turn is connected to Line A of the overground metro system.

=== Line M ===
Line M was opened in 2019. It has a length of 1.05 km and three stations: Miraflores, El Pinal, and Trece de Noviembre. It has a capacity of 2,500 passengers per hour. At Miraflores station, it connects to the Ayacucho Tram line, which in turn is connected to Line A of the overground metro system.

=== Line P ===
Line P was inaugurated on June 10, 2021. It extends west from Acevedo station into comunas 5 and 6 (Castilla, Doce de Octubre), arriving at the Cerro El Picacho ecopark. It has four stations: El Progreso, Doce de Octubre, SENA, and Acevedo, the last one being the transfer point to Line A of the Metro system and Line K.

== Public transit ==
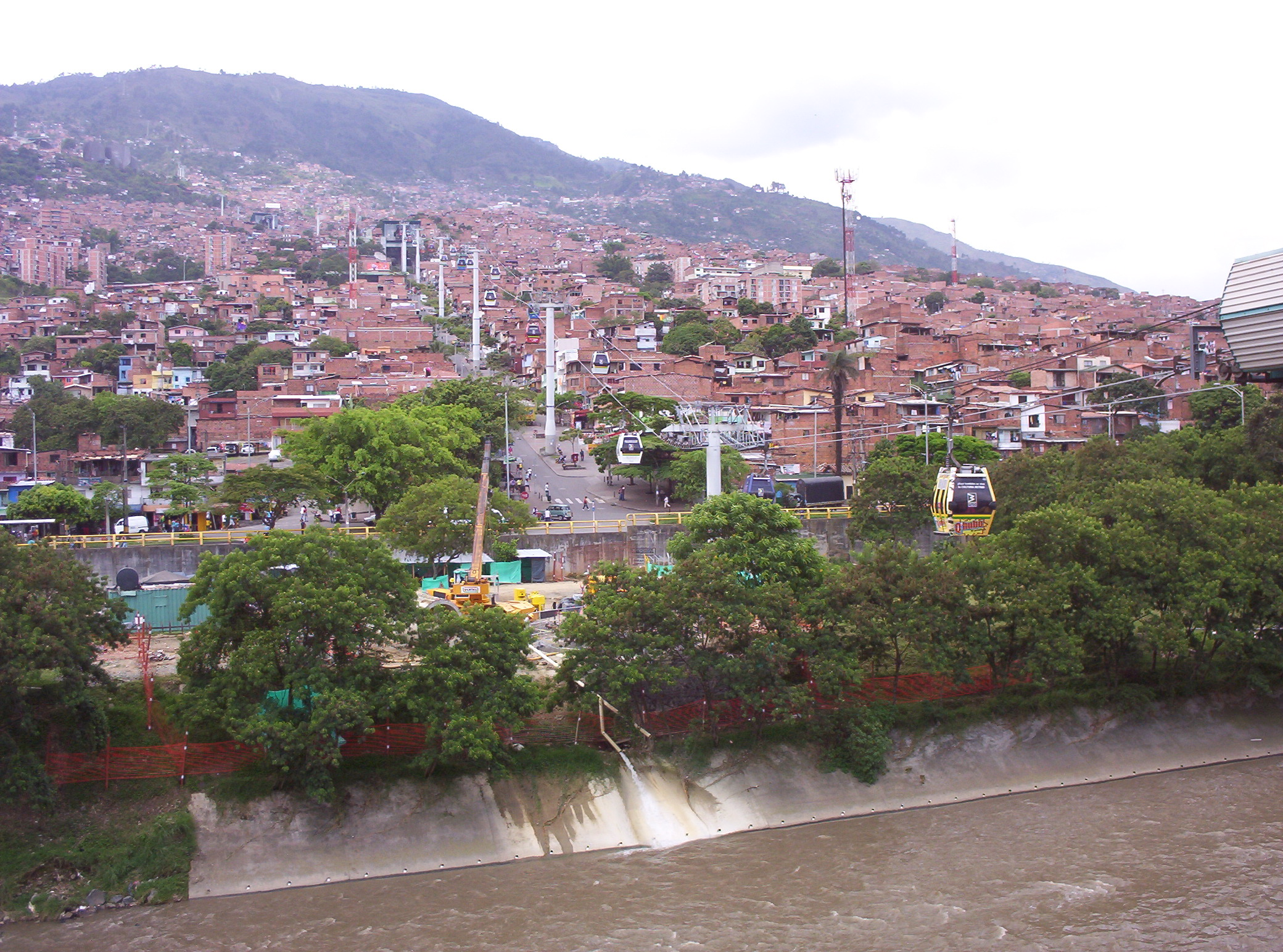
View of Metrocable crossing the Medellín river

Aerial lifts are not often used as a mass transportation system. However, they are becoming more popular, with examples including the Metrocable system in Caracas, Venezuela; the Mexicable system in Ecatepec, Mexico; the Mi Teleférico system in La Paz, Bolivia; the Teleférico do Alemão in Rio de Janeiro, Brazil (currently closed); and, in the United States, the Roosevelt Island Tramway in New York City and the Portland Aerial Tram in Portland, Oregon.

While gondolas used as transit offer many advantages, such as the ability to build on terrain that precludes surface transportation, cost-effectiveness, low emissions, and energy efficiency, one of the disadvantages is the risk of power outages. In case of a hazard or an emergency, it is not possible to exit the cabins. However, Medellín Metro is ameliorating this problem by providing a communication system in every vehicle should an emergency occur.

Studies have suggested correlations between the development of the Metrocable lines and dramatic reductions in crime in the areas where they have been introduced.

== See also ==
Media related to Metrocable at Wikimedia Commons

- Medellín Metro
- Metrocable (Caracas)
- Aerovia (Guayaquil)
- List of gondola lifts
