= Public hospital =

Hospital owned and fully funded by government

A public hospital, or government hospital, is a hospital which is government owned and is predominantly funded by the government and operates predominantly off the money that is collected from taxpayers to fund healthcare initiatives. In almost all the developed countries but the United States of America, and in most of the developing countries, this type of hospital provides medical care almost free of charge to patients, covering expenses and wages by government reimbursement.

The level of government owning the hospital may be local, municipal, state, regional, or national, and eligibility for service, not just for emergencies, may be available to non-citizen residents.

== Americas ==
=== Brazil ===
The Brazilian health system is a mix composed of public hospitals, non-profit philanthropic hospitals, and private hospitals. The majority of the low- and medium-income population uses services provided by public hospitals run by either the state or the municipality. Since the inception of 1988 Federal Constitution, health care is a universal right for everyone living in Brazil: citizens, permanent residents, and foreigners. To provide this service, the Brazilian government created a national public health insurance system called SUS (Sistema Unico de Saúde, Unified Health System) in which all publicly funded hospitals (public and philanthropic entities) receive payments based on the number of patients and procedures performed. The construction and operation of hospitals and health clinics are also a responsibility of the government.

The system provides universal coverage to all patients, including emergency care, preventive medicine, diagnostic procedures, surgeries (except cosmetic procedures) and medicine necessary to treat their condition. However, given budget constraints, these services are often unavailable in the majority of the country with the exception of major metropolitan regions, and even in those cities access to complex procedures may be delayed because of long lines. Despite this scenario, some patients were able to successfully sue the government for full SUS coverage for procedures performed in non-public facilities.

Recently, new legislation has been enacted forbidding private hospitals to refuse treatment to patients with insufficient funds in case of life-threatening emergencies. The law also determines that the healthcare costs in this situation are to be paid by the SUS.

According to the World Health Organization, in 2014, total expenditure on health reached 8.3% of GDP, i.e. $1,318 per capita.

=== Canada ===
In Canada all hospitals are funded through Medicare, Canada's publicly funded universal health insurance system and operated by the provincial governments. Hospitals in Canada treat all Canadian citizens and permanent residents regardless of their age, income, or social status.

According to the World Health Organization, in 2014, total expenditure on health reached 10.4% of GDP, i.e. $4,641 per capita.

Hospital funding in Canada follows provincial health plans and hospitals are required by law to operate within their budgets. Provincial health plans aim to cover wide area of medical services and procedures, from hospital records to nutritional care. On average physician services receive approximately 15% of provincial health funding, while hospitals get around 35%.

Even though hospitals are mostly funded by taxpayers, some hospitals, as well as medical research facilities, receive charitable donations. Besides this, there is increasing trend of privatisation of some hospital services if those services go beyond provincial health budgets. That is usually done in a form of "outsourcing". Hospitals are inclined to outsource any service that is not related to the basic patient care. That includes hospital security, maintenance of information systems, catering service, record keeping. Those services are increasingly provided by private sector. Companies like Data General, Johnson Controls, Versa are main providers of outsourced hospital services in Canada.

=== United States ===
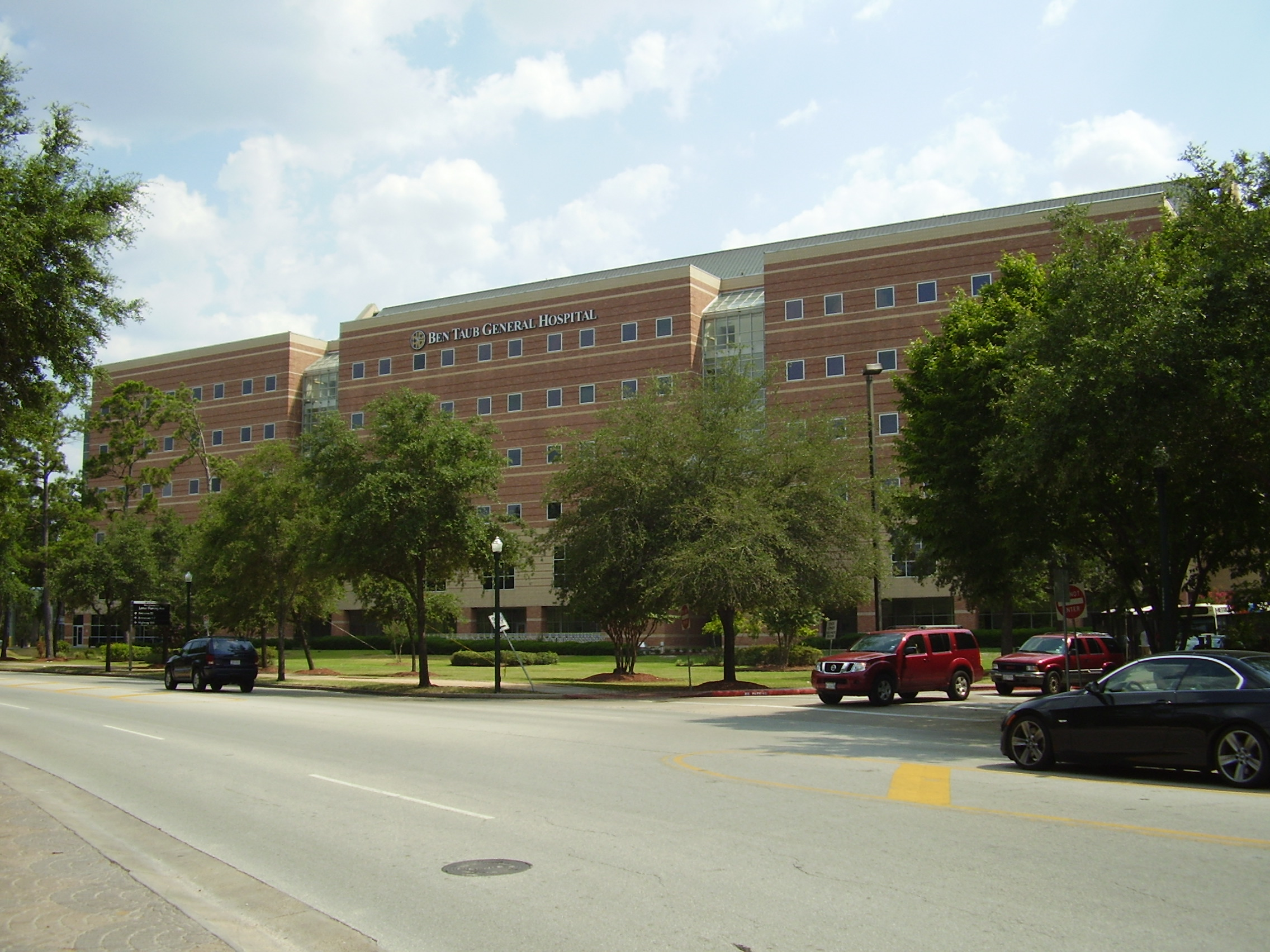
Ben Taub General Hospital in Houston, Texas

In the United States, two thirds of all urban hospitals are non-profit. The remaining third is split between for-profit and public, public hospitals not necessarily being not-for-profit hospital corporations. The urban public hospitals are often associated with medical schools. The largest public hospital system in the U.S. is NYC Health + Hospitals.

==== History ====
The safety-net role of public hospitals has evolved since the 1700s when the first U.S. public hospital sheltered and provided medical healthcare to the poor. Until the late 20th century, public hospitals represented the "poor house" that undertook social welfare roles. The "poor house" also provided secondary medical care, specifically during epidemics. For this reason, these "poor houses" were later known as "pest" houses. Following this phase was the "practitioner period" during which, the then welfare oriented urban public hospitals changed their focus to medical care and formalized nursing care. This new phase was highlighted by the private physicians providing care to patients outside their private practices into inpatient hospital settings. To put into practice the demands of the Flexner Report published in 1910, public hospitals later benefited from the best medical care technology to hire full-time staff members, instruct medical and nursing students during the "academic period". The privatization of public hospitals was often contemplated during this period and stalled once an infectious disease outbreak such as influenza in 1918, tuberculosis in the early 1900s, and the polio epidemic in the 1950s hit the U.S.. At this time, with the goal to improve people's health and welfare by allowing for effective health planning and the creation of neighborhood health centers, health policies like the Social Security Act were enacted. This was followed by Medicare and Medicaid Act in 1965 that gave poor people in the U.S., access to inpatient and outpatient medical care from public hospitals after racial segregation ended in the South. With their mandate to care for low income patients, the public hospital started engaging in leadership roles in the communities they care for since the 1980s.

There was a 14% decrease in public hospitals in the United States from 2008 to 2018, compared to 4% of the total number of hospitals. In 2021 there were 965 public hospitals in the United States, compared to 5,198 hospitals total.

==== Repercussions of accumulated uncompensated care ====
In the U.S., public hospitals receive significant funding from local, state, and/or federal governments. Currently, many urban public hospitals in the U.S. playing the role of safety-net hospitals, which do not turn away the under insured and uninsured, may charge Medicaid, Medicare, and private insurers for the care of patients. Public hospitals, especially in urban areas, have a high concentration of uncompensated care and graduate medical education as compared to all other American hospitals. 23% of emergency care, 63% of burn care and 40% of trauma care are handled by public hospitals in the cities of the United States. Many public hospitals also develop programs for illness prevention with the goal of reducing the cost of care for low-income patients and the hospital, involving Community Health Needs Assessment and identifying and addressing the social, economic, environmental, and individual behavioral determinants of health.

For-profit hospitals were more likely to provide profitable medical services and less likely to provide medical services that were relatively unprofitable. Government or public hospitals were more likely to offer relatively unprofitable medical services. Not-for-profit hospitals often fell in the middle between public and for-profit hospitals in the types of medical services they provided. For-profit hospitals were quicker to respond to changes in profitability of medical services than the other two types of hospitals.

Public hospitals in America are closing at a much faster rate than hospitals overall. The number of public hospitals in major suburbs declined 27% (134 to 98) from 1996 to 2002. Much research has proven the increase in uninsured and Medicaid enrollment entwined to unmet needs for disproportionate share subsidies to be associated with the challenges faced by public hospitals to maintain their financial viability as they compete with the private sector for paying patients. Since the creation of the Affordable Care Act (ACA) in 2010, 15 million of the 48 million previously uninsured receive Medicaid. It is projected that this number will grow to about 33 million by 2018. The provision of good quality ambulatory specialty care for these uninsured and Medicaid enrolled patients has particularly been a challenge for many urban public hospitals. This accounts for many factors ranging from a shortage of specialists who are more likely to practice in the more profitable sectors than in the safety-net, to the lack of clinical space. To overcome this challenge, some public hospitals have adopted disease prevention methods, the increase of specialty providers and clinics, deployment of nurse practitioners and physician assistants in specialty clinics, asynchronous electronic consultations, telehealth, the integration of Primary Care Providers (PCP) in the specialty clinics, and referral by PCP's to specialists.

== Asia ==
=== China ===
After the Cultural Revolution, public healthcare was mandatory and private hospitals became public, state run hospitals. Each person was taken care of by the community, both for their job and for their health. Medicine focused mainly on primary care and basic prevention. The reception structures corresponded to Western dispensaries or hospitals. Because of the welfare state, both hospitals and dispensaries were public. Patients did not pay for the care they receive. However, in hospitals there were differences in the quality of care between managers, their families, deserving workers and other patients. Epidemic prevention posts was set up in 1954 throughout the country and made it possible to eradicate many epidemics. Large-scale vaccination campaigns and the strengthening of medical care in impoverished rural areas made it possible to prevent many diseases. Life expectancy rose from 35 years in 1949 to 65.86 years in 1978.

The 1979 reform of the health system reduced public funding for hospitals from 90% to 15%. Hospitals must be 85% self-financing. As a result, patients have to pay for their health care. Thus, many people can no longer afford to go to hospital for treatment. In 2005, 75% of the rural inhabitants and 45% of the urban inhabitants stated that they could not afford to go to hospital for economic reasons. Urbanization and the abandonment of the countryside mean that 80% of medical resources are located in cities. In 2009, health expenditure represented 4.96% of GDP, or 72.1 euros per capita. Public funding represents 24.7% of total health expenditure. In comparison, public funding in the United States is 50% and it is nearly 80% in Japan and European countries.

Since the SARS crisis in 2003, the Chinese authorities have undertaken health system reforms and health insurance revival. In 2006, the objectives of the health reform were defined as:

- Improving access to health insurance coverage
- Improving the provision of quality care
- Developing community-based care by training general practitioners in particular
- Monitoring the safety and access to basic medicines
- Modernizing public hospitals

Since 2009, an investment plan of 850 billion yuans (over 92 billion euros) was devoted to this reform. In order to improve public hospitals, several recommendations were published in February 2010:

- Generalisation of consultation by appointment
- Reduction in prepayment on admission to hospital and reimbursement by social security on discharge
- Improved claims management
- Improved efficiency of emergency services
- Implementation of protocols for the management of certain diseases (cancers, etc.).
- Reduction in length of stay
- Improved coordination within the hospital
- Accelerating the computerization of hospitals

In February 2010, sixteen hospitals in sixteen cities were designated to test this comprehensive reform.

In November 2010, the Council of State Affairs encouraged the development of private institutions to pluralize the offering of care. To this end, it introduced tax and other benefits to encourage compliance with quality standards, laws and regulations. By 2018 one private hospital network had 8,000 hospitals. "American financial firms like Sequoia Capital and Morgan Stanley have invested billions of dollars" in this network.

According to the World Health Organization, in 2014, total expenditure on health in China reached 5.5% of GDP, i.e. $731 per capita.

=== India ===
In India, public hospitals (called Government Hospitals) provide health care free at the point of use for any Indian citizen or legal resident. These are usually individual state funded. However, hospitals funded by the central (federal) government also exist. State hospitals are run by the state (local) government and may be dispensaries, peripheral(Public) health centers, rural hospital, district hospitals or medical college hospitals (hospitals with affiliated medical college). In many states (like Tamil Nadu) the hospital bill is entirely funded by the state government with patient not having to pay anything for treatment. However, other hospitals will charge nominal amounts for admission to special rooms and for medical and surgical consumables. The reliability and approachability of doctors and staff in private hospitals have resulted in preference of people from the public to private health centers. However state owned hospitals in India are known for high patient load.

According to the World Health Organization, in 2014, total expenditure on health reached 4.7% of GDP, i.e. $267 per capita.

Public hospitals are managed by the Union, State, and Local Self Governments. The Union Government administers tertiary and super-specialty hospitals such as AIIMS, state governments manage most public hospitals including district and sub-district hospitals, while Local Self Governments oversee primary and secondary healthcare facilities like PHCs and CHCs, in coordination with state health departments.

Level	Type of Hospital	Typical Name / Examples	Bed Strength	Services / Remarks
Primary	Sub-Centre (SC)	PHC Sub-Centre, Rural Health Outpost	0	First contact point; preventive & promotive care
Primary	Primary Health Centre (PHC)	PHC, Rural Hospital	6–30	Outpatient care, maternal & child health, minor procedures
Primary	Community Health Centre (CHC) / Block Hospital	CHC, Rural Hospital	30–100	Inpatient care, minor surgeries, referral to higher centers
Secondary	Taluk / Sub-District Hospital	Taluk Hospital, Sub-District Hospital	30–150	Inpatient care, basic surgery, maternity, emergency services
Secondary	District Hospital (DH)	District Hospital, Civil Hospital (Eg:-District Hospital, Kollam, District Hospital Pulwama)	100–500	Multispecialty care, major surgeries, specialist doctors
Tertiary	Medical College Hospital	Government Medical College Hospital (GMCH)	500–2,000+	Teaching, research, tertiary care, super-specialties
Tertiary	Specialty / Super-Specialty Hospital	AIIMS, NCI, Cardiology Hospitals,	200–1,500+	Advanced diagnostics & treatment in specific fields
Tertiary	Regional / Referral Hospital	Regional Cancer Institute, Regional Heart Institute (Eg:-Regional Cancer Centre, Thiruvananthapuram)	200–1,000	Receives referrals from multiple districts; super-specialist services

== Oceania ==
=== Australia ===
In Australia, public hospitals are operated and funded by each individual state's health department. The federal government also contributes funding. Services in public hospitals for all Australian citizens and permanent residents are fully subsidized by the federal government's Medicare Universal Healthcare program. Hospitals in Australia treat all Australian citizens and permanent residents regardless of their age, income, or social status.

Emergency Departments are almost exclusively found in public hospitals. Private hospitals rarely operate emergency departments, and patients treated at these private facilities are billed for care. Some costs, however (pathology, X-ray) may qualify for billing under Medicare.

Where patients hold private health insurance, after initial treatment by a public hospital's emergency department, the patient has the option of being transferred to a private hospital.

According to the World Health Organization, in 2014, total expenditure on health reached 9.4% of GDP, i.e. $4,357 per capita.

== Europe ==
=== France ===
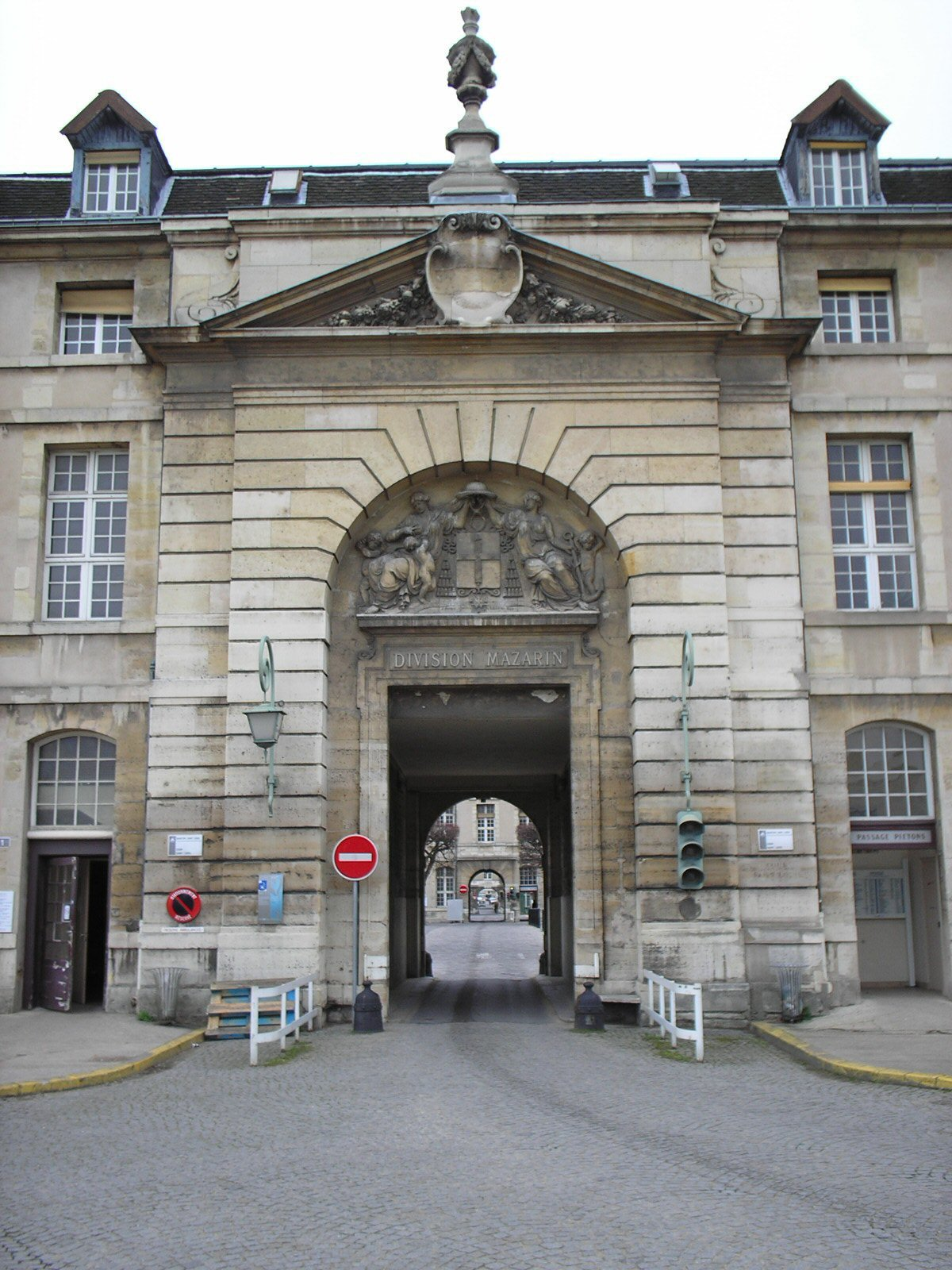
The Pitié-Salpêtrière Hospital is one of Europe's largest hospitals. It is also France's largest hospital.

France have both public and private hospitals, and the public hospitals are managed by a board of directors with their own budget. Everyone in France is covered by a social insurance, meaning people mostly do not have to pay for medical interventions. The purpose of public hospitals in France is to heal everyone, participate in public health actions, and participate in university teaching and research, while guaranteeing equal access to health care for everyone.

All services provided by public hospitals in France can be grouped in 4 categories:

- Health care,
- Prevention,
- Education and training,
- Research.

Public hospitals are mainly financed by employee contributions and health insurance, all of which is public money.

Some important laws and reforms made public hospitals what it is nowadays in France :

- 1996 reform : Creation of « regional hospitalization agencies » to plan and control;Inclusion of users representatives on the board of directors.
- 2005 reform : Creation of an executive council;Simplification of the internal organization, highlighting « business areas » with a greater autonomy;Replacement of the budget by a statement of estimates of revenues and expenditures Establishment of procedures in case of financial problems.
- 2009 reform : Modification of the governance of public health care institutions by setting up a director with a board of directors and a supervisory board;No more executive council.

Administrative organization:

- The Director is the legal representative of the public health care institution. He has important responsibilities and is mainly responsible for the day-to-day management of the hospital, under the supervision of the supervisory board;
- The board of directors is chaired by the director. There are between 7 and 9 members. It advises the director and must be consulted on certain decisions;
- The supervisory board, with only 9 members, supervises the activity of the institution and adopts certain decisions;
- The « Medical Board » is the body representing the medical and pharmaceutical staff of the institution. It is consulted on the principal projects and plays an evaluation role;
- The « technical committee » is the body of representing of the non-medical staff;
- The « Health, safety and working conditions » committee.

In 2020, with the coronavirus crisis, we can see a health crisis. Indeed, between 2006 and 2016, 64 000 beds had been removed. There was also a « wage freeze » and budgetary constraints. It has been a problem during the coronavirus crisis because public hospitals have been needed more than ever, with not enough beds to cope with the huge number of sick people.

University-affiliated hospital (CHU in French) : It is a public hospital that is working with a university. Their purpose is to teach medicine to students, and to practice research. They have been created in 1958 in France. The creation of university hospital centres has led to the emergence of a mixed hospital and university status for employees (doctors, ...). They are attached to a hospital department and a university department, usually within a research laboratory. Among this staff, there are : professors, university lecturers, doctors, clinic managers, ...

According to the World Health Organization, in 2014, total expenditure on health reached 11.5% of GDP, i.e. $4,508 per capita.

=== Germany ===
German healthcare system consists of public hospitals (55 percent of total hospitals), voluntary charitable hospitals (38 percent of total hospitals) and private hospitals (7 percent of total hospitals). In Germany, public hospitals are run by local or federal state authorities. These include Germany's university hospitals. Hospital costs will be taken care of by insurance companies for all people who are covered by public health insurance. On the other hand, clients which are covered by private insurance have to pay additional fees. Children under 18 years of age do not have to pay any costs.

According to the World Health Organization, in 2014, total expenditure on health reached 11.3% of GDP, i.e. $5,182 per capita.

=== Italy ===
In Italy, the health system is organised by the National Health Service (SSN, Servizio Sanitario Nazionale) but the management of the health care system is done at the regional level by Regional Health Agencies working with Local Health Authorities (ASL, Azienda Sanitaria Locale). The SSN provides health coverage that allows access to basic medical care (general medicine, paediatrics, dental care, hospitalization, and some medicines).

According to the World Health Organization, in 2014, total expenditure on health reached 9.2% of GDP, i.e. $3,239 per capita.

There are private and public hospitals. Hospitals contracted by the SSN allow the patient's care to be paid for. Italian hospitals are classified into 3 categories according to their specialities and their capacity to handle emergencies:

- Basic hospitals: limited number of specialties, population area between 80,000 and 150,000 inhabitants.
- Level 1 hospitals: high number of specialties, population area between 150,000 and 300,000 inhabitants.
- Level 2 hospitals: high speciality university hospitals and scientific research institutes, population area between 600 000 and 1.2 million inhabitants.

=== Norway ===
In Norway, all public hospitals are funded from the national budget and run by four Regional Health Authorities (RHA) owned by the Ministry of Health and Care Services. In addition to the public hospitals, a few privately owned health clinics are operating. The four Regional Health Authorities are: Northern Norway Regional Health Authority, Central Norway Regional Health Authority, Western Norway Regional Health Authority, and Southern and Eastern Norway Regional Health Authority. All citizens are eligible for treatment free of charge in the public hospital system. According to The Patients' Rights Act, all citizens have the right to Free Hospital Choices.

According to the World Health Organization (WHO), in 2014, total expenditure on health reached 9.7% of GDP, i.e. $6,347 per capita.

=== Portugal ===
In Portugal, three systems work together to provide health care. The National Universal Health Service, health subsystems and health insurance plans. The National Universal Health Service is a universal system funded through taxation. Adhesion to a health insurance is done through the professional network or voluntarily.

Primary care is provided in public health centres. To receive care in hospital you must have a prescription for a general practitioner except in case of emergency. Hospitals provide secondary and tertiary care as well as emergencies. Portugues hospitals are classified into five groups:

- Group I: Hospitals providing some internal medicine and surgery services and some specialities like oncology, hematology. This depends on the type of population and the framework set by the Central Administration of the Health System.

- Group II: Hospitals providing some internal medicine and surgery services and some specialities that are not able in Group I's hospitals.

- Group III: Hospitals providing all internal medicine and surgery services and all specialities that are not able in Group II's hospitals.

- Group IV: Hospitals specialized in oncology, internal medicine, rehabilitation, psychiatry and mental health.

The lack of coordination between hospitals and primary care centres and the fact that many people went directly to the emergency room. without going to a general practitioner before, have led to the creation of local health units that include one or more hospitals as well as primary centres. These units were created according to geographical location, the balance of specialties and the availability of emergency services.

According to the World Health Organization (WHO), in 2014, total expenditure on health reached 9.5% of GDP, i.e. $2,690 per capita.

=== Spain ===
The Spanish public health system is universal: anyone in need of medical care can apply for it, even those who are not affiliated to the Spanish Social Security and who, in case of need, can go to the emergency room for treatment. People without Social Security and without the European Health Insurance Card must pay for health care. The Spanish national healthcare system covers almost every Spanish. It is financed by taxes, so that Spanish do not have to pay directly for it.

Hospital treatment can be provided in different types of hospitals:

- General hospitals from the national health system: they provide care in different specialties (internal medicine, general medicine, paediatrics, radiology, orthopaedics, obstetrics and gynaecology, etc.).

- Regional hospitals: they provide tertiary treatment or very specialized care which require advanced technologies. They are located in urban zones.

- National reference centres specialized in specific pathologies.

- Private hospitals under contract.

According to the World Health Organization, in 2014, total expenditure on health reached 9.0% of GDP, i.e. $2,966 per capita.

=== Turkey ===
There are different types of public hospitals in Turkey, owned/operated by different entities:

- State hospitals (Devlet Hastanesi), teaching/training and research hospitals (Eğitim ve Araştırma Hastanesi) are owned and operated by the Ministry of Health. Staffing is done by the ministry, except in training hospitals where both the affiliated university staff and ministry healthcare personnel serves together. All training hospitals are either affiliated with the University of Health Sciences or any other public university which had concluded an affiliation agreement with a training hospital.
- City hospitals (Şehir Hastanesi) are operated by private entities under build-operate-transfer contracts, and healthcare organization is done in essentially the same way as training hospitals.
- University hospitals (Üniversite Hastanesi), officially Health Application and Research Centers (Sağlık Uygulama ve Araştırma Merkezi (SUAM)), are owned and operated by universities. Any new permits for founding new university hospitals are not granted for public medical schools founded on or after 2010, however dental schools can still be granted one for dentistry. Affiliated training hospitals with such medical schools are sometimes called a university hospital, owing to the term's ambiguity.
- Eşrefpaşa Hospital is the only surviving example of municipal hospitals (Belediye Hastanesi), owned and operated by İzmir Metropolitan Municipality.

In the past, there were other classifications of public hospitals; such as Social Insurance Institution hospitals (SSK Hastanesi) or colloquially known as "workers' hospital" (işçi hastanesi).

Some of the former military hospitals are re-designated as training hospitals or additional buildings for existing public hospitals and were fully handed over to the ministry. Currently, only Gülhane Training and Research Hospital serves both for the public and substantial military purposes.

=== United Kingdom ===
In the United Kingdom, public hospitals provide health care free at the point of use for the patient, excluding outpatient prescriptions. Private health care is used by less than 8 percent of the population. The UK system is known as the National Health Service (NHS) and has been funded from general taxation since 1948.

According to the World Health Organization (WHO), in 2014, total expenditure on health reached 9.1% of GDP, i.e. $3,377 per capita.

== Africa ==
=== South Africa ===
South Africa has private and public hospitals. Public hospitals are funded by the Department of Health. The majority of the patients use public hospitals in which patients pay a nominal fee, roughly $3–5. The patients point of entry usually is through primary health care (Clinics) usually run by nurses. The next level of care would be district hospitals which have General Practitioners and basic radiographs. The next level of care would be Regional hospitals which have general practitioners, specialists and ICU's, and CT SCANS. The highest level of care is Tertiary which includes super specialists, MRI scans, and nuclear medicine scans.

Private patients either have healthcare insurance, known as medical aid, or have to pay the full amount privately if uninsured.

According to the World Health Organization (WHO), in 2014, total expenditure on health reached 8.8% of GDP, i.e. $1,148 per capita.

=== Zambia ===
"In the main hospital" in Lusaka, Zambia "a surgeon makes about $24,000 a year;" by comparison, "the median salary of a surgeon in New Jersey is $216,000."
