= Oğuz Yılmaz =

Oğuz Yılmaz may refer to:

- Oğuz Yılmaz (musician) (1968-2021), Turkish folk musician
- Oğuz Yılmaz (footballer) (born 1993), Turkish footballer
