= Ankaralı Turgut =

Turkish singer (1963–2024)

- Born: Turgut Karataş; 11 September 1963; Ayaş, Ankara Province, Turkey
- Died: 15 December 2024 (aged 61) Ankara Etlik City Hospital, Varlık, Yenimahalle, Ankara, Turkey
- Genres: Turkish folk; Arabesque
- Instrument: Bağlama
- Years active: 1990s–2024

Turgut Karataş (11 September 1963 – 15 December 2024), better known as Ankaralı Turgut, was a Turkish singer of Romani descent who was one of the oldest and most popular singers from the "Ankaralı" (English: 'from Ankara') school of folk music. Born in Ayaş on 11 September 1963, he started his career in the early 1990s.

== The period of illness and death ==
In 2017, he was hospitalised and treated for COPD (chronic obstructive pulmonary disease).

On 9 August 2024, Turgut, who is from Ankara, fell ill again and was admitted to Etlik City Hospital in Ankara, where he began treatment.

On 5 November 2024, his manager Murat Boran announced that Turgut Karataş's health condition was critical and that he had been intubated.

=== Financial support ===
Having lost 13 kilograms during his illness and unable to begin “Smart Drug” treatment due to financial difficulties, Karataş received donations from his loved ones and fellow artists. He stated that the donations did not reach him and that his family had threatened to take the money by force.

=== Death and funeral ===
Ankaralı Turgut passed away on 15 December 2024 at the age of 61 at Ankara Etlik City Hospital due to cancer, for which he had been receiving treatment for some time. Following the funeral prayer on 16 December, he was buried at Mamak Ortaköy Cemetery.

== Partial discography ==
- Yakalarsam Tık Tık – If I Catch Her, Knock Knock
- Ben Karı İsterim Babo – Daddy, I Want a Woman!
- Ver Diyom Vermiyo – I Say "Give It to Me", She Says "No"
- Ankara'nın Gülleri – Roses of Ankara (feat. Ankaralı Yasemin)
- Turgutça – In Turgut's Language
- Dah Diri Dom Annene Diyiverecem – I'll Tell Your Mother, 'Dah Diri Dom'
- Para – Money

== See also ==
- Ankaralı Namık
- Oğuz Yılmaz
