= Samsun City Hospital =

Samsun Hospital

Geography
- Location: Canik, Samsun
- Coordinates: 41°14′35″N 36°20′17″E

Organisation
- Network: Turkish Ministry of Health

Services
- Beds: 900

Helipads
- Helipad: Yes

History
- Founded: December 2023; 2 years ago

Links
- Website: samsunsehir.saglik.gov.tr/TR-611829/sehir-hastanemiz.html

Samsun City Hospital (Turkish: Samsun Şehir Hastanesi) is a full-service city hospital located in the Canik district of Samsun, Turkey. It is expected to be the largest hospital in Samsun Province and the Black Sea Region.

== History ==
The project has 1.069 billion TL in financing by the Turkish government and various banks. Groundbreaking took place in November 2020. The hospital is a public–private partnership between the Turkish Ministry of Health and private interests. It would be the first city hospital in Samsun to be operated by the Turkish Ministry of Health.

Construction began in 2020. The move from Samsun Eğitim ve Araştırma Hastanesi continues in 2026.

== Location ==
The City Hospital is located on a slope in the Canik district near the regional bus station south of Ankara Highway. The campus covers 213,886 square meters and includes a central hospital complex and parking garage. New roads to the campus are under construction as the hospital complex is in a primarily agricultural edge district adjacent to the urbanized core.

== Facilities ==
The hospital is designed for 651 single beds, 197 intensive care units, 16 inmates and 36 palliative beds, for a total of 900 beds, 275 polyclinics and 43 patient support areas. The hospital is planned to include 40 operating rooms, 1 hybrid operating room, 5 physical therapy units, advanced pathology laboratories and other specialized units. The hospital includes an earthquake isolator, solar energy system, surface parking for 300 vehicles and an enclosed garage for 1503 vehicles. Officials claim that the building will be an environmentally friendly structure that aims for the goal of zero waste.

Samsun City Hospital will have offices for gynecology, pediatrics, general surgery and plastic surgery. Plans include polyclinics in every field and special operating rooms for cardiovascular surgery.

== See also ==
- Ankara City Hospital
- Başakşehir Çam and Sakura City Hospital
- Ankara Etlik City Hospital
