= City Hospital =

City Hospital may refer to:

- City Hospital, Aberdeen, Scotland
- City Hospital, Birmingham, West Midlands, England
- City Hospital (Roosevelt Island, New York), United States
- Saskatoon City Hospital, Canada
- City International Hospital, Vietnam
- City Hospital (British TV series)
- City Hospital (American TV series)
- City Hospital railway station

== See also ==
- List of city hospitals in Turkey
