= List of city hospitals in Turkey =

This page lists the city hospitals of Turkey. City hospitals are larger healthcare complexes in Turkey, operating under build-operate-transfer contracts and staffed by Ministry of Health personnel.

== List ==
=== In Service ===
Province	Name	Capacity (bed)	Opening Date
Adana	Adana City Hospital	1550	15 September 2017
Ankara	Ankara Bilkent City Hospital	3711	14 March 2019
Ankara	Etlik City Hospital	3624	September 2022
Antalya	Antalya City Hospital	1500	
Aydın	Aydın City Hospital	1300	
Balıkesir	Balıkesir Atatürk City Hospital	1100	3 April 2017
Bursa	Bursa City Hospital	1355	16 July 2019
Elazığ	Elazığ Fethi Sekin City Hospital	1038	1 August 2018
Erzurum	Erzurum City Hospital	1574	17 July 2021
Eskişehir	Eskişehir City Hospital	1060	30 October 2018
Gaziantep	Gaziantep City Hospital	1875	2023
Isparta	Isparta City Hospital	744	24 March 2017
İstanbul	Başakşehir Çam and Sakura City Hospital	2682	20 April 2020
İstanbul	Prof. Dr. Cemil Taşcıoğlu City Hospital	827	30 March 2020
İstanbul	Göztepe Prof. Dr. Süleyman Yalçın City Hospital	800	5 September 2020
İstanbul	Kartal Dr. Lütfi Kırdar City Hospital	1161	4 July 2020
İzmir	İzmir Bayraklı City Hospital	2060	October 2022
Kahramanmaraş	Kahramanmaraş Necip Fazıl City Hospital	1040	20 January 2012
Kayseri	Kayseri City Hospital	1607	5 May 2018
Kocaeli	Kocaeli City Hospital	1210	2022
Konya	Konya City Hospital	1250	5 August 2020
Kütahya	Kütahya City Hospital	610	December 2022
Manisa	Manisa City Hospital	558	27 October 2018
Mersin	Mersin City Hospital	1294	3 February 2017
Ordu	Ordu City Hospital		
Samsun	Samsun City Hospital		
Şanlıurfa	Şanlıurfa City Hospital		
Tekirdağ	Tekirdağ İsmail Fehmi Cumalıoğlu City Hospital	486	13 November 2020
Yozgat	Yozgat City Hospital	475	16 January 2017

=== Under construction ===
Province	Name	Capacity (bed)	Opening Date

== See also ==
- List of hospitals in Turkey
- List of military hospitals in Turkey
