= Spyridon Mavrogenis =

Turkish doctor and physician

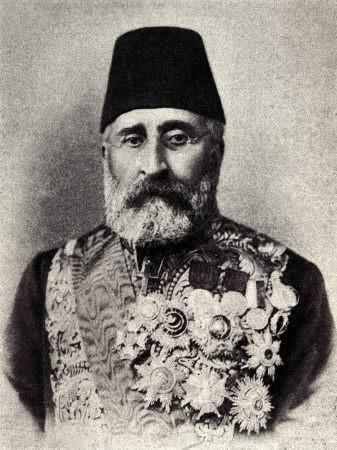
Photo of Spyridon Mavrogenis Pasha

Spyridon Mavrogenis Pasha (Greek: Σπυρίδων Μαυρογένης), in Turkish known as Ispiro Mavroyani, was a Phanariot Greek doctor who was the physician of Abdul Hamid II, Sultan of the Ottoman Empire. Constantinos Trompoukis and John Lascaratos described him as "a prolific scholar". He was fluent in Greek, French, and German.

== History ==
A member of the Mavrogheni family, his great-grandfather was Petros Mavrogenis. (Note: According to Théodore Blancard, the Mavrogeni family descended from the Venetian Morosini family, itself descending from the older Byzantine Mavrogenis family. According to Blancard, following the conquest of the Byzantine Empire by Mehmed II, the Mavrogeni family dispersed along the coasts of the Aegean Sea and the Adriatic Sea. A branch of the family ended in Peloponnese, another in Euboea and a third one in Crete. Blancard notes that the relation between the two names is evidenced both by the phonetic and orthographic resemblance of the two names and by the use of the Lion of Saint Mark on the coat of arms of the Mavrogeni family in exactly the same form as it appears on the coat of arms of the Morozini family.) His father died when he was young, so he lived with his uncle, Ioannis Mavrogenis, who was living in Vienna as the chargé d'affairs of the local Ottoman mission. He had studied at the Chalcis Commercial School prior to living with his uncle and at a medical studies programme in Vienna from 1835-1843. He initially remained in that city, working in city-owned hospital as an auxiliary doctor. He came back to Constantinople in 1845.

Whilst back in Turkey, he became a doctor in the Artillery Hospital, and then, beginning in 1848, a professor at the Imperial Medical School. He initially taught hygiene, and later pathology. There he advocated for French as a medium of instruction. He held meetings of the Greek Literary Society, created in 1861, at his house.

His son, Alexandros Mavrogenis, was a diplomat. George Anogianakis, author of "Reflections of Western Thinking on Nineteenth-Century Ottoman Thought: A Critique of the 'Hard-Problem' by Spyridon Mavrogenis, a Nineteenth Century Physiologist," wrote that the fact his son had such a coveted job "is indicative of Mavrogenis' influence". When his relationship with Abdul Hamid deteriorated, his son lost his envoy job.

== Works ==
The Life of Constantine Caratheodory by Mavrogenis

- "The Life of Constantine Caratheodory" (Βίος Κωνσταντίνος Καραθεοδωρή). Gauthier-Villars (Paris), 1885.
  - Mavrogenis was a friend of Caratheodory, who was a founder and member of the literary society, and the biography was issued for a 7 January 1880 celebration. As the Ottoman authorities censored works published domestically, this biography was published abroad. Caratheodory's older son asked Mavrogenis to add two narrations, one about a presentation by Caratheodory at the Medical Academy of Paris and one about an account of Mahmud II's death deriving from a pamphlet edited by Caratheodory. Mavrogenis edited the biography five years after the initial publication.

He also wrote an entry in "Treatises of Physiology".

== Honours ==
In the title page of his monograph on Constantin Carathéodory, his titles are stated:

- Senator
- Order of Osmaniye, 1st class
- Order of Medjidie, 1st class,
- Knight of the Order of Distinction
- Grand Cross of the Austro-Hungarian Order of the Iron Crown
- Grand Cross of the Swedish Order of Vasa
- Persian Order of the Lion and the Sun, 1st class
- Commander of the Belgian Order of Leopold

== Sources ==
- Anogianakis, George. "Reflections of Western Thinking on Nineteenth-Century Ottoman Thought: A Critique of the 'Hard-Problem' by Spyridon Mavrogenis, a Nineteenth Century Physiologist" (Chapter 6). In: Smith, C.U.M. (Aston University) and Harry Whitaker (Northern Michigan University) (editors). Brain, Mind and Consciousness in the History of Neuroscience. Springer Science and Business, 23 April 2014. ISBN 9401787743, 9789401787741.
- Trompoukis, Constantinos; Lascaratos, John (2003). "Greek Professors of the Medical School of Constantinople during a Period of Reformation (1839–76)". Journal of Medical Biography. 11 (4): 226–231. doi:10.1177/096777200301100411. PMID 14562157. S2CID 11201905. - First published November 1, 2003.
