= Gülhane Training and Research Hospital =

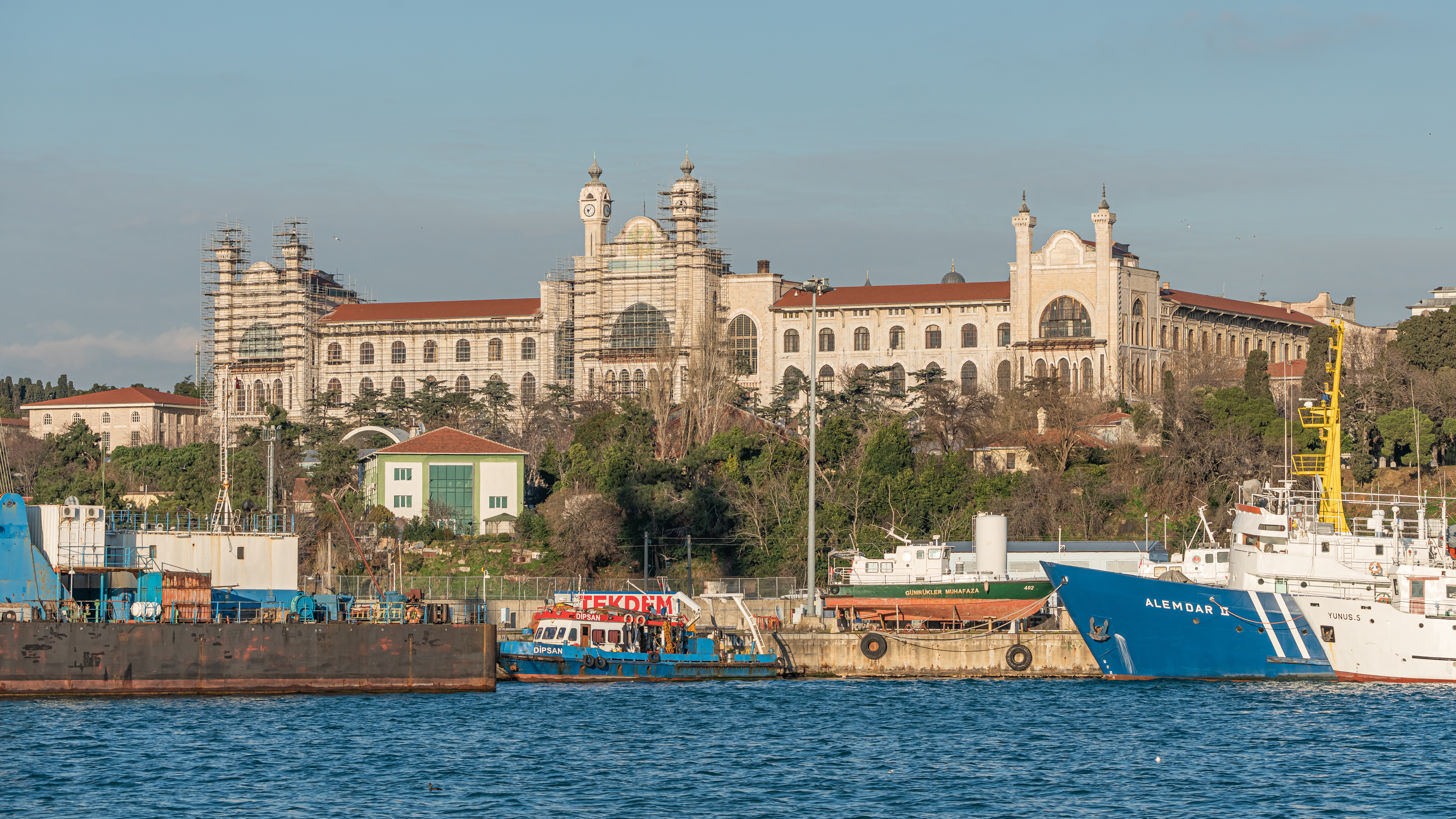
- Gülhane Military Medical Academy (1903), its first building, Istanbul.

- Location within Turkey

Geography
- Coordinates: 40°00′N 32°52′E

Organisation
- Affiliated university: University of Health Sciences

History
- Founded: 1898

Links
- Website: https://gulhaneeah.saglik.gov.tr

The Gülhane Training and Research Hospital (GEAH), formerly known as Gülhane Military Medical Academy (GATA), is a teaching hospital located in Ankara, Turkey. It was founded by Abdülhamit II in 1898 in Istanbul as Gülhane Seririyat Hospital. The hospital was moved to Ankara in 1941.

== History ==
Gülhane Academy, which was attached to the Turkish army until 2016, has been a command training for the Turkish Armed Forces in the field of health sciences. Young medical officers and health technician petty officers graduated from here. However, after the 2016 Turkish coup d'état attempt, it was affiliated to the Ministry of Health together with the health units with the decree having the force of law issued by the current government on 31 July 2016 and its name was changed to Gülhane Training and Research Hospital. Higher education units affiliated with GATA were transferred to the University of Health Sciences. Today the hospital is affiliated with the Gulhane Medical School.

After Bulgaria's alliance with Axis and the Axis invasion of Greece; when the government were discussing possibility of entering World War II, the government was decided to move the military schools and Gülhane from Istanbul to Ankara in 1941, and all the goods and personnel packed into a 28-wagons from Istanbul were transferred to Cebeci Central Hospital via Sirkeci, Istanbul. The hospital later formed the backbone of Ankara University Medical School. In 1952, the facilities in Cebeci were transferred to the medical school and the hospital was moved to the current Turkish Land Forces headquarters in Bahçelievler. In 1971, the hospital was moved to the current site in Etlik. The Gulhane Military Medical Faculty was established in 1980.

== Settlement and subunits ==
Gulhane Military Medical Academy Command and its affiliated units were located in Ankara, Istanbul and Eskişehir. Affiliated units until September 2016:

=== Ankara ===
- GATA Command Headquarters
- Gülhane Military Medical Faculty and Training Hospital
- Health Sciences Institute
- Research and Development Center
- Biomedical Engineering Center
- Center for Dentistry Sciences
- Pharmacy Sciences Center
- Air and Space Medicine Center
- Post Graduate Doctorate Planning and Coordination Center
- School of Nursing
- Health NCO Vocational School
- TAF Rehabilitation and Care Center

=== Istanbul ===
- Haydarpasa Training Hospital

=== Eskişehir ===
- Air and Space Medicine Center

== Graduates ==
- Ali Rıza Pasin
- Hulusi Behçet
- Cevdet Kerim İncedayı
- Menahem Hodara
