= Imperial School of Medicine (Ottoman Empire) =

Constantinople medical school

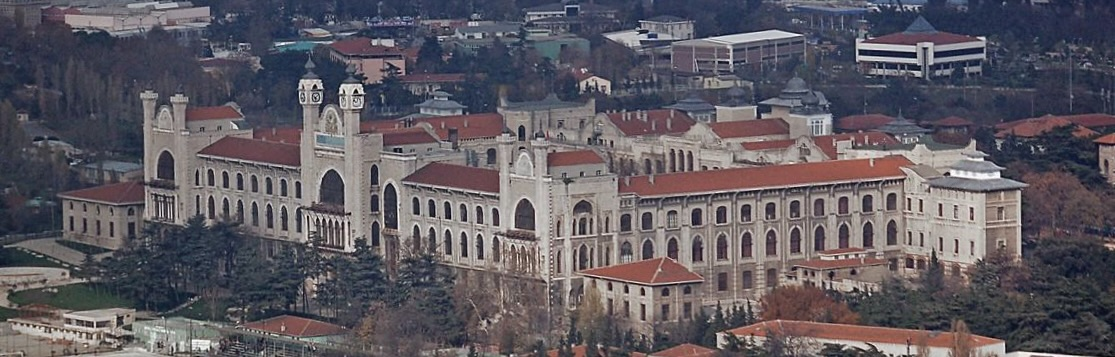
Hamidiye campus of University of Health Sciences (Turkey), originally the Imperial School of Medicine.

The Imperial Military School of Medicine, or the Imperial School of Medicine (Ottoman Turkish: مَكْتَبِ طبیە شاهانە, Turkish: Mekteb-i Tıbbiye-i Şahane) was a school of medicine in Ottoman Constantinople. The school has changed locations several times. The well-known building in the Üsküdar district of Istanbul is a collaboration by Levantine architect Alexandre Vallaury and Raimondo D'Aronco in the Ottoman Revivalist architectural style, incorporating Ottoman and Seljuk design features. It was built between 1893 and 1903. It currently houses the University of Health Sciences campus at Haydarpaşa.

Originally commissioned by Sultan Mahmud II in 1827 to be operated by the military, it was the empire's first medical school, modeled on those in the West. Ottoman Muslims did not often study abroad, and most of the faculty's founding staff were religious minorities from non-Muslim Ottoman families. Their foreign language skills and study at European institutions laid the foundation for the establishment of medicine in the Ottoman Empire.

== History ==
Sultan Mahmud II established the school on 14 March 1827. That year Mahmud II announced that the school would for the time being teach in French. At that time most of the instructors and students at the military medical school were non-Muslims and included Armenians, Arab Christians, Bulgarians, and Greeks. The campus was in a former imperial page school, in Galatasaray, in Pera (now Beyoğlu). Accordingly students were known as the "Students of Galatasaray". Turkish names for the institution included Darü'l-ulûmi'l-hikemiyye and Mekteb-i Tıbbiye-i şahane, and official French names included École Impériale de Médecine de Galata Serai, Faculté de médecine de l'Empire ottoman (circa 1843), and Faculté de médecine de Constantinople (circa 1853).

According to Constantinos Trompoukis and John Lascaratos Greeks were well-represented among founding staff due to their foreign-language skills and their study experiences in Europe. Many Ottoman Muslims hitherto had not focused on foreign languages. Johann Strauss, author of "Twenty Years in the Ottoman Capital: The Memoirs of Dr. Hristo Tanev Stambolski of Kazanlik (1843-1932) from an Ottoman Point of View," wrote that in the teaching staff "Greeks were especially conspicuous". In addition professors from Germany joined the faculty, Thusly, a sizeable portion of the teaching staff was drawn from the empire's non-Muslim religious communities supplemented by visiting Germans.

The building suffered from a fire in 1848 which destroyed some official records. The school moved to the Golden Horn. In 1850 the school had eleven regular professors; four of them were ethnic Greeks.

In 1861 the Counsel of Civil Medical Affairs requested that the medical college begin licensing pharmacists after incidents with unlicensed pharmacists caused injuries and deaths in the empire. Afterwards pharmacists were required to have a master of pharmacy from the Imperial Medical School, or an equivalent from a university in Europe.

It moved to the gardens of Topkapı Palace in Sarayburnu (Seraglio Point) in 1866, and that year alumnus Salih Effendi became the head of the school.

By the 1860s advocates of French medium instruction and Ottoman Turkish medium instruction were engaged in conflict; Turks advocated for Turkish while minority groups and foreigners advocated for French. Spyridon Mavrogenis, employed in the imperial medical school as a professor, advocated for the usage of French. The governing body, the Dari-Choura, adopted the proposal of Ahmet Bey to make Ottoman Turkish the instructional language, arguing that Muslim students were at a disadvantage with French; at the time Muslims made up about 66% of the students.

By 1871, after the Tanzimat movement gave additional rights to Christian minorities, the school had a Greek director. Of the 18 other professors, nine were Greeks.

It merged with the civilian medical school in 1909 to form what was known as the Medical School.

== Governance ==
Circa 1871 the Dari-Choura were the governing body of the school. According to Dr. R. Sarell, who was a doctor employed at the Imperial Maternity Hospital in the city, many members had a military background or lacked an education altogether, something he criticised them for.

== Notable people ==
Professors

- Constantinos Caratheodory (1802-1879)
- Friedrich Wilhelm Noë (1798 – 1858), also the director of the school's botanical garden.
- Spyridon Mavrogenis

Strauss identified Sarandes Archigenes (1809-1874) a.k.a. Sarandi Bey; Stephan Caratheodory a.k.a. İstefanaki Effendi; and Constantine Caratheodory (1802-1879), a nephew of Stephan; as being the most notable Greek teachers.

== The Herbarium of the Imperial School of Medicine ==
Friedrich Wilhelm Noë established a herbarium at the school. Specimens distributed from this herbarium are today held worldwide, including at the National Herbarium of Victoria, at the Royal Botanic Gardens Victoria.

== See also ==
- Education in the Ottoman Empire
