= Manto Mavrogenous =

Greek revolutionary (1796–1848)

- Μαντώ Μαυρογένους
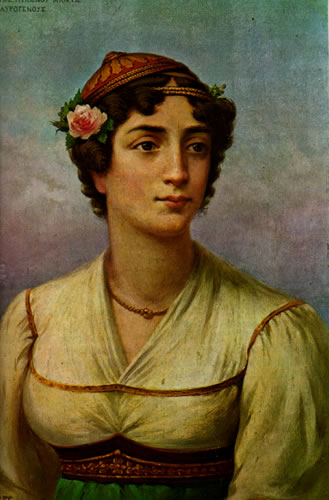
- 1827 lithography
- Born: 1796 or 1797; Trieste, Habsburg monarchy
- Died: July 1848 (aged 51–52); Paros, Greece
- Military career
- Allegiance: Greece
- Rank: Honorary lieutenant general

Manto Mavrogenous (Greek: Μαντώ Μαυρογένους; 1796 – July 1848) was a Greek princess and heroine of the Greek War of Independence. An extremely wealthy aristocrat, she contributed her fortune to the Hellenic cause. Under her encouragement, her aristocratic European friends contributed money and guns to the revolution.

== Early life ==
Manto Mavrogenous was born in Trieste, then in the Habsburg monarchy, now part of Italy. She was the daughter of the merchant and member of the Filiki Eteria, Nikolaos Mavrogenis and his wife, Zacharati Chatzi Bati. One of her ancestors, the great-uncle of her father, Nicholas Mavrogenes, was Dragoman of the Fleet and Prince of Wallachia.

A beautiful woman of aristocratic lineage, she grew up in an educated family, influenced by the Age of Enlightenment. She studied ancient Greek philosophy and history at a college in Trieste, and spoke French, Italian and Turkish fluently.

== Greek War of Independence ==
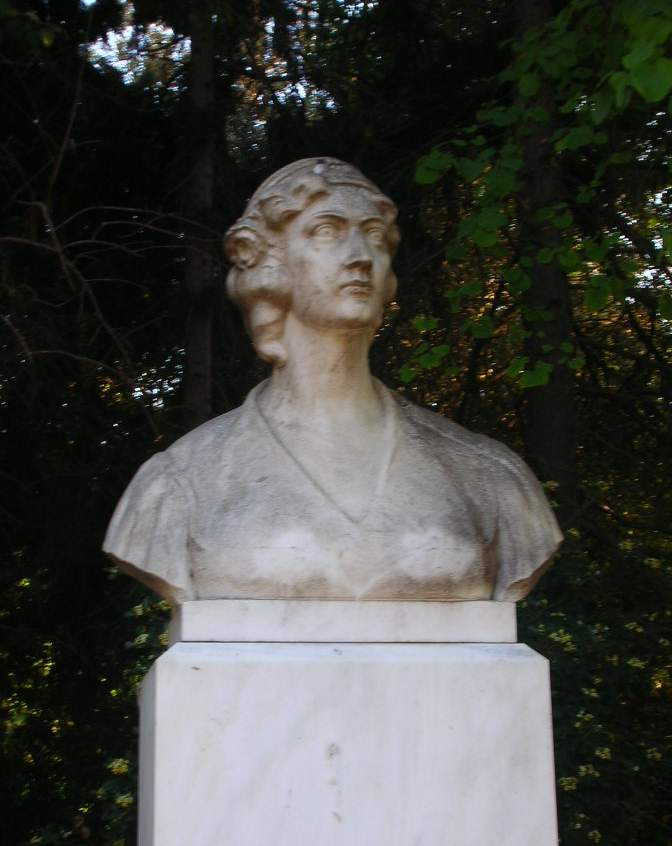
Bust of Manto Mavrogenous in Athens.

In 1809, she moved to Paros with her family, where she learned from her father that the Filiki Eteria was preparing what would become known as the Greek Revolution and later, in 1818, after her father's death, she left for Tinos. When the struggle began, she went to Mykonos, the island of her origin, and invited the leaders of Mykonos to join the revolution.

She equipped, manned and "privateered" at her own expense, two ships with which she pursued the pirates who attacked Mykonos and other islands of Cyclades. On 22 October 1822, the Mykonians repulsed the Ottoman Turks, who had debarked on the island, under her leadership. She also equipped 150 men to campaign in the Peloponnese and sent forces and financial support to Samos, when the island was threatened by the Turks. Later, Mavrogenous sent another corps of fifty men to the Peloponnese, who took part in the Siege of Tripolitsa and the fall of the town to the Greek rebels. Together, she financed the relief of the soldiers and their families, the preparation of a campaign to Northern Greece and the support of several philhellenes.

She later put together a flotilla of six ships and an infantry consisting of sixteen companies, with fifty men each, and took part in the battle in Karystos in 1822, and funded a campaign to Chios, but she was unable to prevent the massacre. Another group of fifty men was sent to reinforce Nikitaras in the Battle of Dervenakia. When the Ottoman fleet appeared in the Cyclades, she returned to Tinos and sold some of her jewellery to finance the equipment of 200 men who fought the enemy and to take care of two thousand people who had survived the first siege of Missolonghi. Her men participated in several other battles like those of Pelion, Phthiotis and Livadeia.

Mavrogenous led enlightenment expeditions in Europe and addressed an appeal to the women of Paris, to side up with the Greeks. She moved to Nafplio in 1823, in order to be in the core of the struggle, leaving her family, as she was despised even by her mother because of her choices. It is at this time that Mavrogenous met Demetrios Ypsilantis, with whom she was soon engaged. Soon, she became famous around Europe for her beauty and bravery. But in May of the same year, her home was burnt to the ground; thus, she went to Tripoli to live with Ypsilanti.

Portrait of Manto Mavrogenous.

"The Greeks, born to be liberal, will owe their independence only to themselves. So I don't ask your intervention to force your compatriots to help us. But only to change the idea of sending help to our enemies. The war spreads the horrible death..."
The letter of Manto Mavrogenous to the women of Paris

Mavrogenous' engagement to Demetrios Ypsilantis was opposed by several powerful politicians who saw the unification of two powerful families, Mavrogenis and Ypsilantis, which held pro-Russian affiliations, as a threat. Chief among their opponents in Greece was Ioannis Kolettis, who led the successful charge to break the engagement, whereupon she returned to Nafplio. After Ypsilanti's death and her intense political conflicts with Ioannis Kolettis, she was exiled from Nafplio and returned to Mykonos, where she occupied herself with the writing of her memoirs.

When the war ended, Ioannis Kapodistrias awarded her the rank of Lieutenant General and granted her a dwelling in Nafplio, to which she moved. She owned a valuable sword, with the inscription "Δίκασον Κύριε τους αδικούντας με, τους πολεμούντας με, βασίλευε των Βασιλευόντων", which is translated to 'Lord, judge those who wrong me, who battle me, rule over the Kings'. That sword is said to come from the times of Constantine the Great, and Mavrogenous gave it to Kapodistrias.

== Later years ==
Mavrogenous moved to Paros in 1840, where some of her relatives resided, and lived and died in a house that is still privately owned. The home is located near the Panagia Ekatontapyliani (the Church of the Virgin Mary), which, tradition says, was founded by Saint Helena, mother of Constantine the Great. Mavrogenous died on Paros in July 1848.

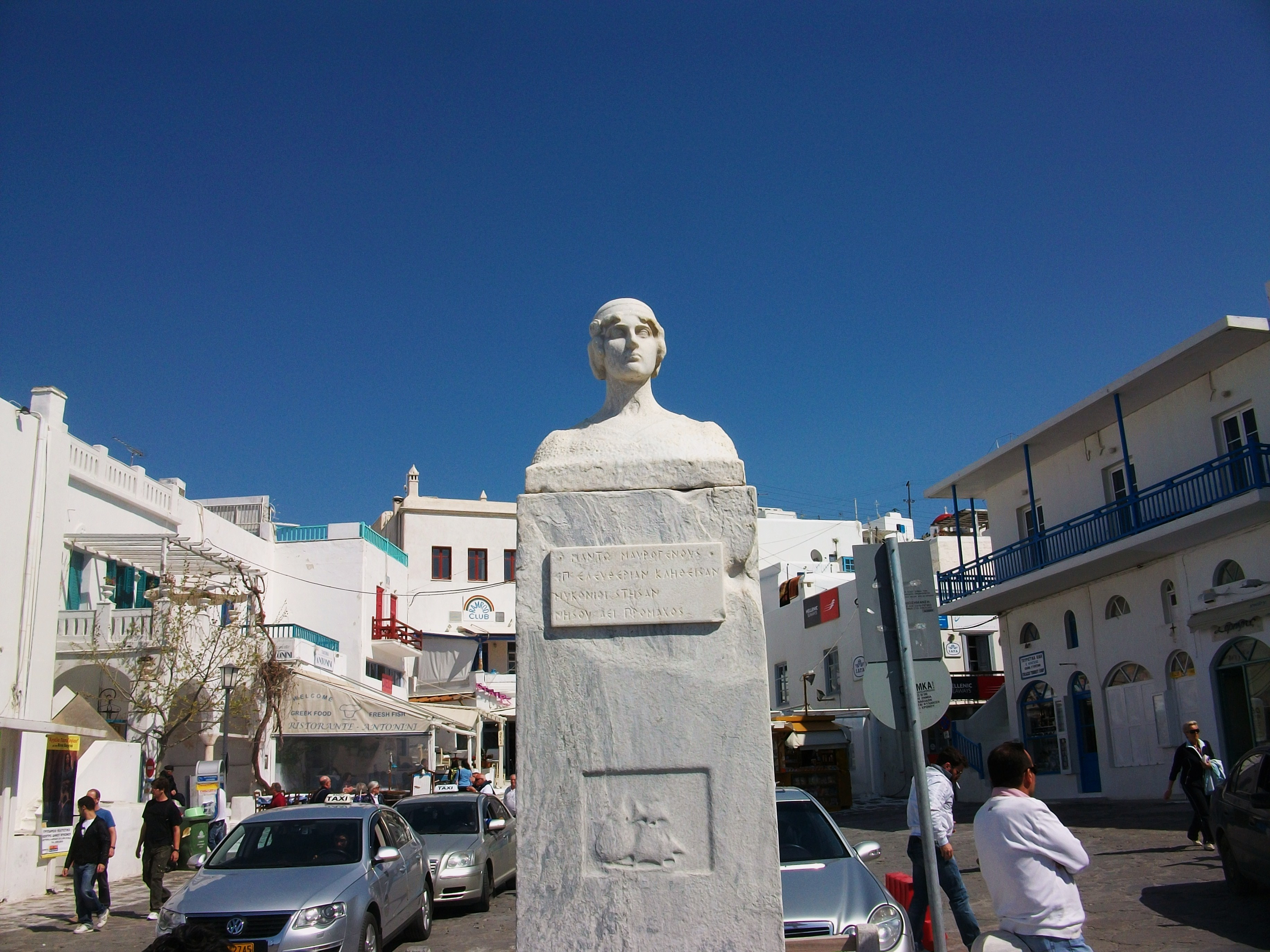
Bust of Mavrogenous in the capital of Mykonos

== Legacy ==
The central plaza in the capital town of Mykonos bears her name and contains a larger-than-life bust of her. The main square in the port town of Paroikia in Paros has also been given her name. Greece has honoured this heroine by naming several streets across the country after her. The Greek government has released several commemorative coins in her honour. A film was also made about her life, titled Manto Mavrogenous (1971), in which she was portrayed by Tzeni Karezi.

Mavrogenous was depicted on the reverse of the Greek 2 drachmas coin of 1988–2001.

== Relatives ==
Manto has relatives in the Mavrogenous/Delicari family.
