= Ankaralı Namık =

Turkish singer (1976–2015)

- Also known as: Ankaralı Namık; Ayarcı Namık; Sazcı Namık
- Born: Namık Uğurlu; 1 May 1976; Yeşilöz, Kurşunlu, Çankırı Province, Turkey
- Died: 18 October 2015 (aged 39) Keçiören, Ankara Province, Turkey
- Genres: Turkish folk, Arabesque
- Instruments: Bağlama, Electrobaglama
- Years active: 2002–2015

Namık Uğurlu (1 May 1976, Kurşunlu, Çankırı – 18 October 2015, Ankara), better known as Ankaralı Namık, was a Turkish male folk music artist. "Ankaralı" means from Ankara, denoting his musical style of Ankara's ethnic music. He is best known for his songs "Arabada Beş, Evde Onbeş", and "Dar Geldi Sana Ankara".

On 19 September 2015, he had a traffic accident with his wife, in which he was severely injured. One month after the accident, on 18 October 2015, he fell from the 7th floor of his home to his death.

== Discography ==
Year	Title	Sales and certificates
2005	Arabada Beş Evde Onbeş: Özmüzik	Turkey: 200,000; Platinum
2006	Salla: Özmüzik	
2006	Yapıştır Koçum: Released: 5 June 2006, Özmüzik	
2006	Hovarda (Naynini): Released: 26 October 2006	Turkey: 100,000; Gold
2007	Ah Babam Sağ Olsaydı: Released: 19 December 2007, Avrupa Müzik	
2010	Dar Geldi Sana Ankara: Released: 23 March 2010, Tutku Müzik	
2011	Seviyorsan Bak Yüzüme & Mezar Taşları: Released: 29 March 2011	
2012	Uyuma Dayı Paranı Çalarlar: Released: 8 August 2012, ECM Müzik	
2013	Oğlumun Tabancası – Tak Tak Eder Amcası: Released: 13 September 2013, Kenan Kaya Prodüksiyon	
2014	Ananın Hayrına Ver: Released: 26 August 2014, Cinan Müzik	

=== Collaborations ===
Year	Title	Sales and certificates
2013	"Ankara Kurtlar Vadisi" with Ethem Yeşiltaş & Ali Albay & Teksaslı Özcan & Şentepeli Şükrü: Released: 11 June 2013, Class Production	
2014	"Ankara Oyun Havaları" with Hüseyin Kağıt & Nesrin & Mesut Dağlı & Mehmet Erenler: Released: 3 January 2014, Özmüzik	

== See also ==
- Ankaralı Turgut
- Oğuz Yılmaz
