= Constantinos Caratheodory (1802–1879) =

Ottoman physician

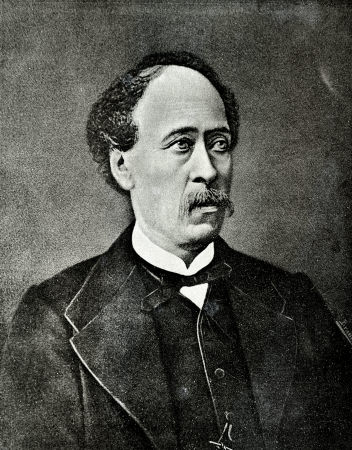
Constantinos Caratheodory

Constantinos Caratheodory (Greek: Κωνσταντίνος Καραθεοδωρή, romanized: Kostantinos Karatheodori, Turkish: Kostadinos Karatodori, French: Constantin Carathéodory; 5 February 1802-28 September 1879) was an Ottoman Greek medical doctor who served as the personal medical doctor of Abdülmecid I, the Sultan of the Ottoman Empire.

The historian Johann Strauss describes him as one of the "best known" teachers at the Imperial School of Medicine in Constantinople, now known as Istanbul.

== History ==
The Life of Constantine Caratheodory by Spyridon Mavrogenis Pasha

Caratheodory was born in Adrianople, now known in English as Edirne. He graduated from the Greek School of Adrianople and then attended the Greek School of Bucharest for a year. However he moved to Vienna after his uncle from his mother's side, Cyril VI of Constantinople, died in the Constantinople massacre of 1821. Cyril and an uncle from his father's side, a doctor named Stephanos Caratheodory (İstefanaki Efendi), who also later taught at the Imperial School of Medicine. had helped guide Caratheodory's education. He attended medical school in Pisa, Italy, beginning in 1824 and receiving his degree on 30 May 1827. He did additional medical coursework in Paris and London, in 1827-1829 and 1829–1830, respectively, with the former being in surgery.

He became a professor at the School of Medicine (Tıbhane-i Amire/Cerrahane-i Mamure) in Constantinople on 10 May 1830. Stephanos Caratheodory was also a professor there, and it was established at the time he arrived. The Ottoman court designated him as one of its doctors, and Caratheodory became the Hospital of Infectious Diseases' head doctor, and in 1836 the professor of the surgical ward.

He founded the Ottoman Imperial Medicine Society, and co-founded the Greek Literary Society of Constantinople (now known as Istanbul).

He was friends with Spyridon Mavrogenis, who later wrote a biography of him, "The Life of Constantine Caratheodory" (Βίος Κωνσταντίνος Καραθεοδωρή), first published by Gauthier-Villars in Paris in 1885. The biography was issued for a 7 January 1880 celebration. As the Ottoman authorities censored works published domestically, this biography was published abroad. Caratheodory's older son asked Mavrogenis to add two narrations, one about a presentation by Caratheodory at the Medical Academy of Paris and one about an account of Mahmud II's death deriving from a pamphlet edited by Caratheodory. Mavrogenis edited the biography five years after the initial publication.

== Personal life ==
In 1835 he married Grand Dragoman Stavraki Aristarchi's daughter, and after her death remarried another woman. Circa 1838 his first son, Stephanos, was born, and he in total had at least four children. His first and his second wives both died of childbirth, the first from birthing Stephanos and the second from birthing the fourth child. He later married a third wife.

His grandson was the renowned mathematician and academic Constantin Carathéodory.

== Sources ==
- Trompoukis, Constantinos; Lascaratos, John (January 2001). "The professor Constantinos Caratheodory (1802-1879) - His biography by Spyridon Mavrogeni Pasha". Yeni tıp tarihi araştırmaları = The new history of medicine studies (7): 27–33.
