= University of Health Sciences (Turkey) =

Public university in Haydarpaşa, İstanbul, Turkey

- Sağlık Bilimleri Üniversitesi
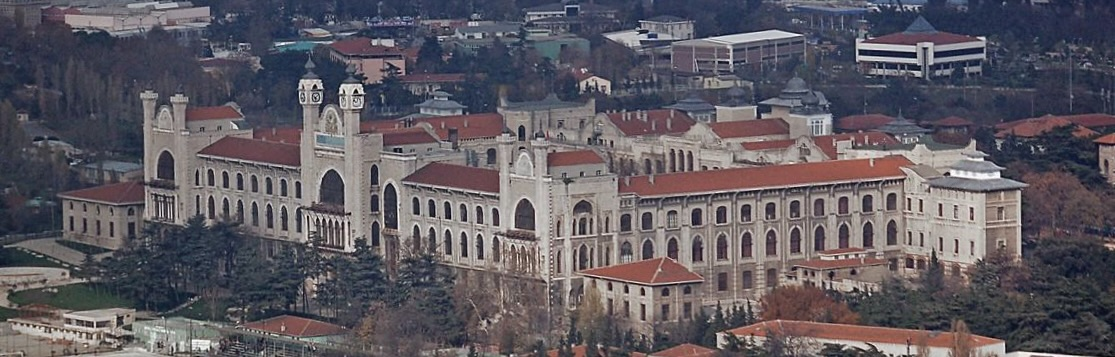
- Hamidiye Campus at Haydarpaşa, Istanbul
- Other names: University of Health Sciences, Turkey
- Type: Public
- Established: 13 March 1827; 199 years ago as the Imperial School of Medicine (Note: 1903 as medical school in Istanbul.); 27 March 2015; 11 years ago as the University of Health Sciences
- Founder: Mahmud II
- Rector: Prof. Dr. Kemalettin Aydın
- Location: Haydarpaşa, Istanbul, Turkey; 40.98716°N 29.05434°E
- Campus: Urban
- Other campuses: Ankara; Adana; Bursa; Erzurum; İzmir; Kayseri; Sarajevo; Çobanbey; Bukhara; Samarkand; Mogadishu
- Colors: Navy Maroon
- Website: uhs.edu.tr

The University of Health Sciences (Turkish: Sağlık Bilimleri Üniversitesi; SBÜ) is a public university in Turkey established in 2015. As of 2019, the rector of the university is Prof. Dr. Kemalettin Aydın.

== History ==
The University of Health Sciences was established on 27 March 2015. On 15 April 2015, the Haydarpaşa Campus of Marmara University, located in the Haydarpaşa neighborhood of Kadıköy, Istanbul, was allocated to the University of Health Sciences. The Haydarpaşa Campus was named Mekteb-i Tıbbiyye-i Şahane Külliyesi (English: Imperial School of Medicine Campus) to reflect the historical significance of the original building.

In August 2016, the Gülhane Military Medical Academy (Turkish: Gülhane Askeri Tıp Akademisi) in Etlik, Ankara, was incorporated into the University of Health Sciences following the removal of its military status. The university began its education in the 2016–17 academic year with 82 students enrolled in the medicine program.

The university is unique as per its hospital affiliations and structure; at least 56 different teaching hospitals throughout the country are affiliated with the SBU as of 2018.

=== Hamidiye Campus in Istanbul ===
The construction of the Haydarpaşa Campus building was commissioned by the Ottoman Sultan Abdulhamid II (r. 1876–1909) in 1894. The building was designed by the French-Ottoman architect Alexander Vallaury (1850–1921) and the Italian architect Raimondo D'Aronco (1857–1932). The rectangular-plan structure spans 54 daa (54,000 m^{2}), with an inner courtyard covering 80 daa (80,000 m^{2}) of land.

The School of Medicine, named Mekteb-i Tıbbiyye-i Şahane (Ottoman Turkish: مَكْتَبِ طبیە شاهانە, lit. "Royal School of Medicine"), was officially opened by Sultan Abdulhamid II on his birthday, 6 November 1903. The building initially housed the Military Medicine School until 1909, after which it became home to a civilian medical school. It included a botanical garden with medicinal plants and featured faculties of medicine and pharmacy. An underground tunnel connected the school to the military hospital across the street.

In 1933, following the reorganization of higher education in Turkey as part of Atatürk's reforms, the School of Medicine was closed. The building was subsequently allocated to Haydarpaşa High School. From 1983 onwards, the building was used by Marmara University as the Haydarpaşa Campus, which included a Faculty of Medicine. The campus was transferred to University of Health Sciences in 2016.

In June 2019, a presidential decree designated all faculties, colleges, and institutes located at the Haydarpaşa Campus with the prefix Hamidiye, in honor of Abdulhamid II, the founder of the original medical school.

=== Gülhane Campus in Ankara ===
In 1897, a protocol was signed with the German Empire to enhance medical education in the Ottoman Empire. In 1898, Prof. Robert Rieder of the University of Bonn and Dr. Georg Deycke of the University Medical Center Hamburg-Eppendorf arrived in Istanbul. In addition to their work at the Imperial School of Medicine, they transformed the building of the military junior high school within Gülhane (lit. "Rose Garden"), the courtyard of the Ottoman Sultan's Topkapı Palace, into a healthcare facility. The facility was opened on 30 December 1898 and named Gülhane Seririyat Hastanesi (English: Gülhane Clinic Hospital).

Gülhane Hospital's active presence began in 1909, when its physicians, who had been transferred to the newly established Faculty of Medicine, formed the majority of the academic staff. During World War I, the hospital played a crucial role in providing healthcare to the Ottoman Army and treating wounded soldiers from the Battle of Gallipoli. During the occupation of Istanbul from 1918 to 1923, Gülhane Hospital was relocated to the Gümüşsuyu quarter of Beyoğlu, Istanbul, where it continued to operate throughout the Turkish War of Independence. After the end of the occupation, the hospital returned to its original location.

With the onset of World War II, it was decided to relocate Gülhane Hospital to Ankara. In 1941, it began operations as Gülhane Askeri Tababet Okulu ve Hastanesi (English: Gülhane Military Medical School and Hospital) in the buildings of the military hospital in the Cebeci quarter of Çankaya, Ankara. The institution played a significant role in the establishment of Ankara University Medical School in 1945, with eleven of the fourteen professors and founding staff members coming from Gülhane Military Medical School and Hospital. In 1947, it was renamed Gülhane Askeri Tıp Akademisi or GATA (English: Gülhane Military Medical Academy) and collaborated with Ankara University's Medical School until 1952.

In 1952, the Academy relocated from Cebeci to Bahçelievler, Ankara, leaving its buildings to Ankara University's Medical School. As the facilities became inadequate, a decision was made in 1963 to construct a modern hospital complex in the Etlik, Ankara. In 1971, the Academy moved to its new location.

After the 2016 Turkish coup d'état attempt on 15 July, all 32 military hospitals, including GATA, were transferred from the Ministry of National Defense to the Ministry of Health in August of the same year. GATA was renamed Gülhane Eğitim ve Araştırma Hastanesi (English: Gülhane Training and Research Hospital) and was incorporated into the University of Health Sciences by a presidential decree.

== Academics ==
Location of Hamidiye Campus in Istanbul, Turkey

=== Medical Schools ===
- Haydarpaşa Faculty of Medicine in İstanbul
- Gülhane Faculty of Medicine in Ankara
- Adana Faculty of Medicine
- Bursa Faculty of Medicine
- Erzurum Faculty of Medicine
- İzmir Faculty of Medicine
- Kayseri Faculty of Medicine

=== Hamidiye Campus in Haydarpaşa, Istanbul ===
Sources:

- Faculty of Medicine
- Faculty of Dentistry
- Faculty of Pharmacy
- Faculty of Nursing
- Faculty of Health Sciences
- Faculty of International Medicine
- Faculty of Life Sciences
- Institute of Health Sciences
- Institute of Sports Health and Sports Science.

=== Gülhane Campus in Etlik, Ankara ===
- Faculty of Medicine
- Faculty of Dentistry
- Faculty of Pharmacy
- Faculty of Nursing
- Faculty of Health Sciences

=== Abroad ===
- Samarkand Faculty of Medicine
- İbni Sina Faculty of Medicine in Bukhara
- Recep Tayyip Erdoğan Vocational School of Health Services in Mogadishu
- Çobanbey Faculty of Medicine and Vocational School of Health Services in al-Rai near Aleppo
- International Faculty of Medicine in Sarajevo
