= Mavrogheni =

Greek noble family

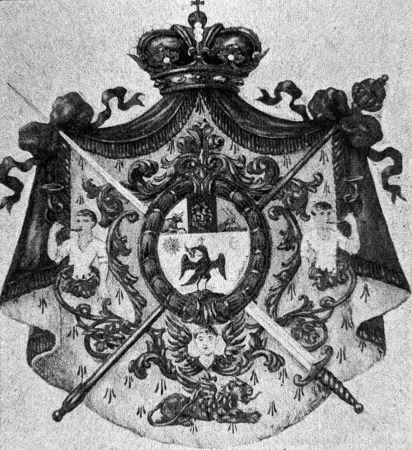
Coat of Arms of the Mavrogheni family

The House of Mavrogheni or Mavrogenis (Greek: Μαυρογένης) is a noble family of Greek origin, whose members occupied many important positions in Paros, Mykonos, Crete, Ikaria, Constantinople, the Principality of Samos, as well as in Wallachia, Moldavia and in the Kingdom of Romania.

== History ==
A reputed origin in the Venetian patrician Morosini family, though widely claimed, is not substantiated.

After the conquest of Karystos by the Turks, the Mavrogenides fled to the Cyclades. In 1715 two brothers, Petros and Stefanos, bought large lands in Paros and rebuilt the island's church. Stefanos left for Constantinople and served as Dragoman of the Fleet, while Petros remained in Paros. The family then expanded to Mykonos, of which they owned 3/4 of the land. The highlight of the family fortune culminated with the appointment of Nikolaos Mavrogenis as the ruling Prince of Wallachia, since he had previously served as Dragoman of the fleet. The prominent path of the family was continued by other members, such as Stefanos Mavrogenis, nephew of Nikolaos, who served as Grand Logothete of the Patriarchate. But even after the revolution in 1821, members of the family distinguished themselves in the social life of the Ottoman and Greek states. Such were Alexandros Mavrogenis the ambassador of Turkey (Stephanos' nephew), Spyridon's son, the sultan's arch-physician, etc. In the Greek revolution, the Mavrogenis family was glorified once again thanks to the contribution of Manto Mavrogenous (Stephanos' niece), who donated all her wealth for the struggle. In free Greece, many members of the family were lieutenant generals, mayors, parliamentarians, etc. A branch of the family also existed in Crete, which in fact became particularly famous with the revolution of Mavrogenis in 1858.

== Notable members ==
- Nicholas Mavrogenes (1735–1790), Prince of Wallachia
- Manto Mavrogenous (1796–1848), heroine of the Greek War of Independence
- Petre Mavrogheni (1819–1887), Romanian politician

== Sources ==
- Blancard, Théodore (1909a). Les Mavroyéni, histoire d'Orient (de 1700 à nos jours), Tome Premier (in French). Paris: Ernest Leroux.
- Blancard, Théodore (1909b). Les Mavroyéni, histoire d'Orient (de 1700 à nos jours), Tome Second (in French). Paris: Ernest Leroux.
- Chalandon, Ferdinand (1910). "Théodore Blancard. Les Mavroyeni. Histoire d'Orient de 1700 à nos jours. Paris, Leroux, 1909". Bibliothèque de l'école des chartes (in French). 71: 382.
