= Friedrich Wilhelm Noë =

German botanist and pharmacist (1798–1858)

Friedrich Wilhelm Noë (1798 in Berlin – 1858 in Constantinople) was a German-born, Austrian pharmacist and botanist.

Prior to 1844, he worked as a pharmacist in Fiume and contributed to the knowledge of its flora by distributing an exsiccata-like specimen series called Plantae Istrianae exsiccatae. At that time he was in close scientific contact with well-known botanists like Ludwig Reichenbach.

Afterwards he moved to Constantinople, where he taught classes in botany at the Êcole Impériale de Médicine de Galata Serai and served as director of its botanical garden. He collected plants in the Balkans, on islands within the Gulf of Quarnero, in Asia Minor and in Mesopotamia. On a journey to Mount Olympus, he reportedly discovered gold.

The plant genus Noaea (family Amaranthaceae) sometimes said to be named in his honor, actually honors the Vicomte de Noé, who studied North African Lamiaceae. Some taxa with the specific epithets of noeana and noeanus are named for him; examples being Medicago noeana and Aster noeanus.
