= Bilkent =

Coordinates: 39°51′49″N 32°44′57″E

- District
- Location within Turkey Location within Turkey Central Anatolia
- Country: Turkey
- Province: Ankara
- Time zone: UTC+3 (TRT)
- Postal code: 06800

Bilkent is a district in Ankara, Turkey, with the postal code 06800 where Bilkent University is located.

Besides Bilkent University, a technological improvement and tech start-up center called CYBERPARK is also located inside the district. CYBERPARK hosts more than 250 developing tech companies.

Three housing sites situated in green fields and woods provide its residents with natural settings, social facilities, sports areas and children's playgrounds. These are among Ankara's most prestigious addresses and 3,500 residential and commercial units serve a variety of demands and needs.
