= Oğuz Yılmaz (musician) =

Turkish folk musician (1968–2021)

- Born: 25 October 1968; Sincan, Ankara Province, Turkey
- Died: 19 May 2021 (aged 52) Eryaman, Etimesgut, Ankara, Turkey
- Genres: Turkish folk music, Arabesque
- Instruments: Bağlama, Electrobaglama
- Years active: 1989–2021

Oğuz Yılmaz (25 October 1968 – 19 May 2021) was a Turkish male folk music artist. He was born and raised in Ankara, Turkey. He lived and performed most of his origin in Sincan, a region of Ankara. Therefore, he is also known as "Oguz from Sincan". His lyrics were controversial, educational and also entertaining. His musical style was a combination of traditional music.

== Discography ==
- Gel Yanıma Gel
- Kibar Kız
- Ayaş Yolları
- Dursun
- Tik Tak
- Kaynana
- Tak Zilleri
- Hanımefendi Mi Oldun?
- Arabistan Kızları
- Akşamcı
- Baldız
- Alemci
- Çık Ortaya Gel
- Tırı Vırı
- Sakın
- Gıdı Gıdı Hatçam
- Otuz Beşlik Rakı
- Çok Yalvardım Sana
- Unutma Dostum
- Dilber
- Çekirge
- Yersen
- Usta (Bas bas paraları Leyla'ya)

== See also ==
- Ankaralı Turgut
- Ankaralı Namık
