= Teaching hospital =

Hospital or clinic providing medical education

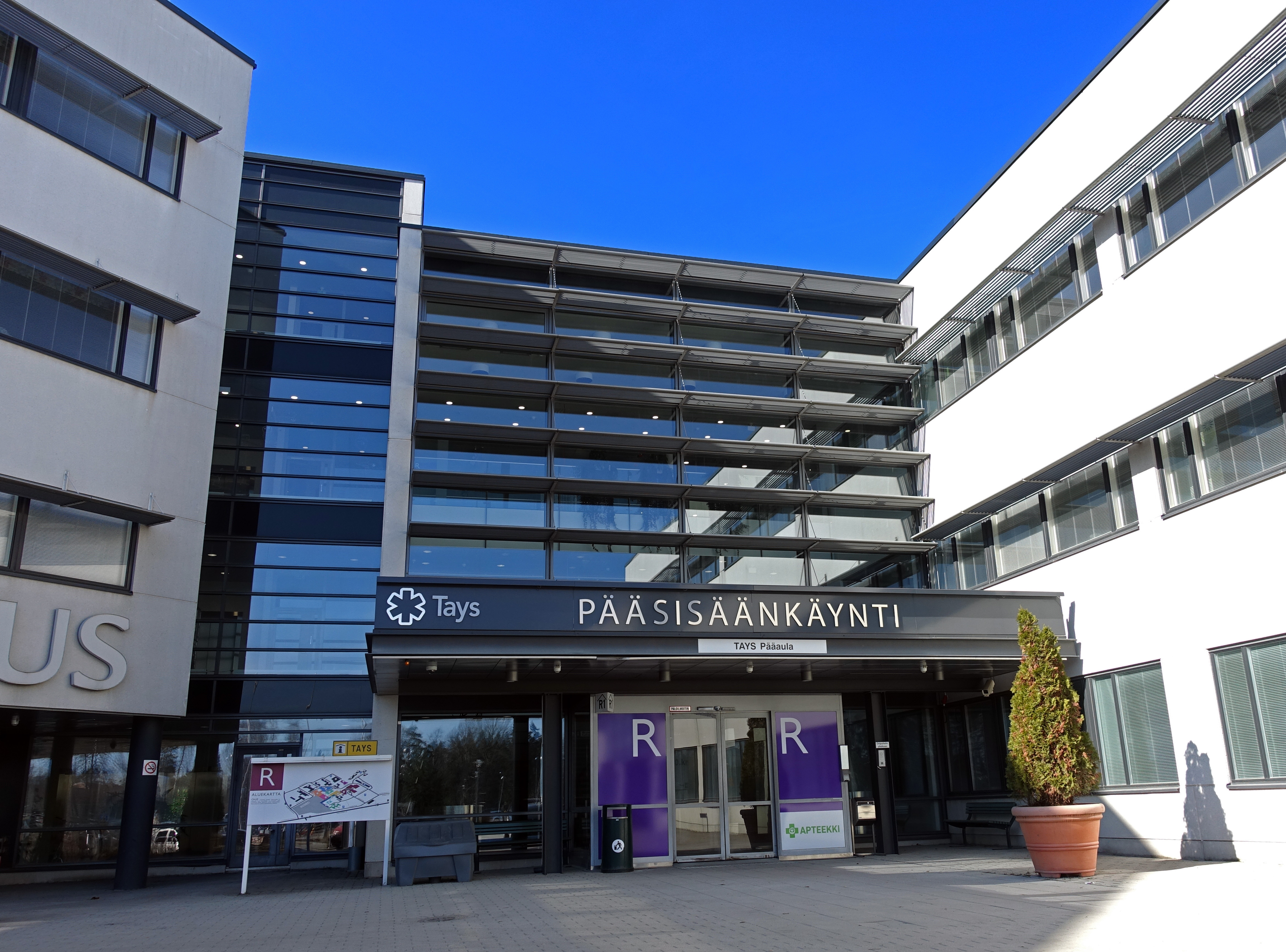
Entrance of the Tampere University Hospital (TAYS) in Tampere, Finland

A teaching hospital or university hospital is a hospital or medical center that provides medical education and training to future and current health professionals. Teaching hospitals are almost always affiliated with one or more universities and are often co-located with medical schools.

Teaching hospitals use a residency program to educate qualified physicians, podiatrists, dentists, and pharmacists who are receiving training after attaining the degree of MD, DO, DPM, DDS, DMD, PharmD, BDS, BDent, MBBS, MBChB, or BMed. Those that attend a teaching hospital or clinic practice medicine under the direct or indirect supervision of a senior medical clinician registered in that specialty, such as an attending physician or consultant. The purpose of these residency programs is to create an environment where new doctors can learn to practice medicine in a safe setting which is supervised by physicians that provide both oversight and education.

== History ==
The first teaching hospital where students were authorized to methodically practice on patients under the supervision of physicians was reportedly the Academy of Gundishapur in the Persian Empire during the Sassanid era. Some of the earliest teaching hospitals were the Islamic Bimaristans, which included the Al-Adudi Hospital founded in Baghdad in 981 and the Al-Fustat Hospital in Cairo founded in 872.

== Definitions ==
The following definitions are commonly used in connection with teaching hospitals:

- Medical student — A person enrolled in a medical degree program at a medical school. In the graduate medical education model used in the United States, medical students must first complete an undergraduate degree from a university or college before being accepted to a medical school. In the undergraduate model traditionally used in countries such as the United Kingdom or Australia, medicine is an undergraduate university degree which students directly enter from high school. In more recent years, the graduate model has increasingly been adopted in the UK and Australia as well, without entirely displacing the traditional undergraduate model – both graduate entry and undergraduate entry programs coexist. (Historically, the undergraduate model used to exist in the US as well, but had been abandoned by the mid-19th century.)
- Physician assistant — Medical professionals who have completed training at the master's level. They are trained to practice medicine alongside physicians on a population level allowing them to work in a wide range of specialties. This profession is not traditionally found in most countries outside North America, but in recent years there have been attempts to establish it in some of them, with mixed success.
- Intern — A person that has a doctorate of medicine from a graduate medical school, or a Bachelor of Medicine/Bachelor of Surgery (in the British undergraduate model), that only practices with guidance and supervision of a physician/consultant.
- Residency or post-graduate program — In the US and Canada, individuals that have completed their first year of a medical internship. Residencies may last anywhere from two to seven years, depending on the specialty. In most Commonwealth countries, the role of specialist registrar is roughly equivalent.
- Specialist registrar — In the British system, a doctor who is receiving advanced training in a medical specialty in a hospital setting; after four to six years as a specialist registrar, the doctor may then undertake a post-training fellowship, before becoming a consultant.
- Attending physician — In the US and Canada, an attending physician (also known as an attending, rendering doc, or staff physician) is a physician (M.D. or D.O.) who has completed residency and practices medicine in a clinic or hospital, in the specialty learned during residency. An attending physician typically supervises fellows, residents, medical students, and other practitioners. Attending physicians may also maintain professorships at an affiliated medical school.
- Consultant — The equivalent concept to "attending physician" in most Commonwealth countries (except for Canada).
- Fellowship (medicine) — A period of medical training in the United States and Canada, that a physician, dentist, or veterinarian may undertake after completing a specialty training program (residency). During this time (usually over a year), the physician is known as a fellow. Fellows are capable of acting as an attending physician or a consultant physician in the specialist field in which they were trained.
- Grand rounds — A methodology of medical education and inpatient care, consisting of presenting the medical problems and treatment of a particular patient to an audience consisting of doctors, pharmacists, residents, and medical students. It was first conceived by clinicians as a way for junior colleagues to round on patients.
- Teaching clinic — A teaching clinic is an outpatient clinic that provides health care for ambulatory patients, as opposed to inpatients, treated in a hospital. Teaching clinics traditionally are operated by educational facilities and provide free or low-cost services to patients.
- Nurse education — Some teaching hospitals partner with nursing education institutions to provide in-hospital, practical education for nurses, both graduate and undergraduate.

== Research ==
Many teaching hospitals and medical centers are known for the medical research that is performed in their hospitals. Close association with medical colleges and universities enhances the research programs at teaching hospitals. Some of the more notable teaching hospitals include:

- Cedars-Sinai Medical Center in Los Angeles, California, U.S.
- Charité in Berlin, Germany
- Cleveland Clinic in Cleveland, Ohio, U.S.
- Dhaka Medical College Hospital in Dhaka, Bangladesh
- Froedtert Hospital and the Medical College of Wisconsin in Milwaukee County, U.S.
- Johns Hopkins Hospital in Baltimore, Maryland, U.S.
- Massachusetts General Hospital in Boston, Massachusetts, U.S.
- Mayo Clinic in Rochester, Minnesota, U.S.
- NorthShore University Health System in Northbrook, Illinois, U.S.
- Ronald Reagan UCLA Medical Center in Los Angeles, California, U.S.
- Sheba Medical Center in Ramat Gan, Israel
- Singapore General Hospital in Bukit Merah, Singapore
- Toronto General Hospital in Toronto, Ontario, Canada
- University of Alberta Hospital in Edmonton, Alberta, Canada
- University Hospital of Zürich in Zurich, Switzerland
- UPMC Presbyterian in Pittsburgh, Pennsylvania, U.S.

== By region ==
=== Africa ===
==== Algeria ====
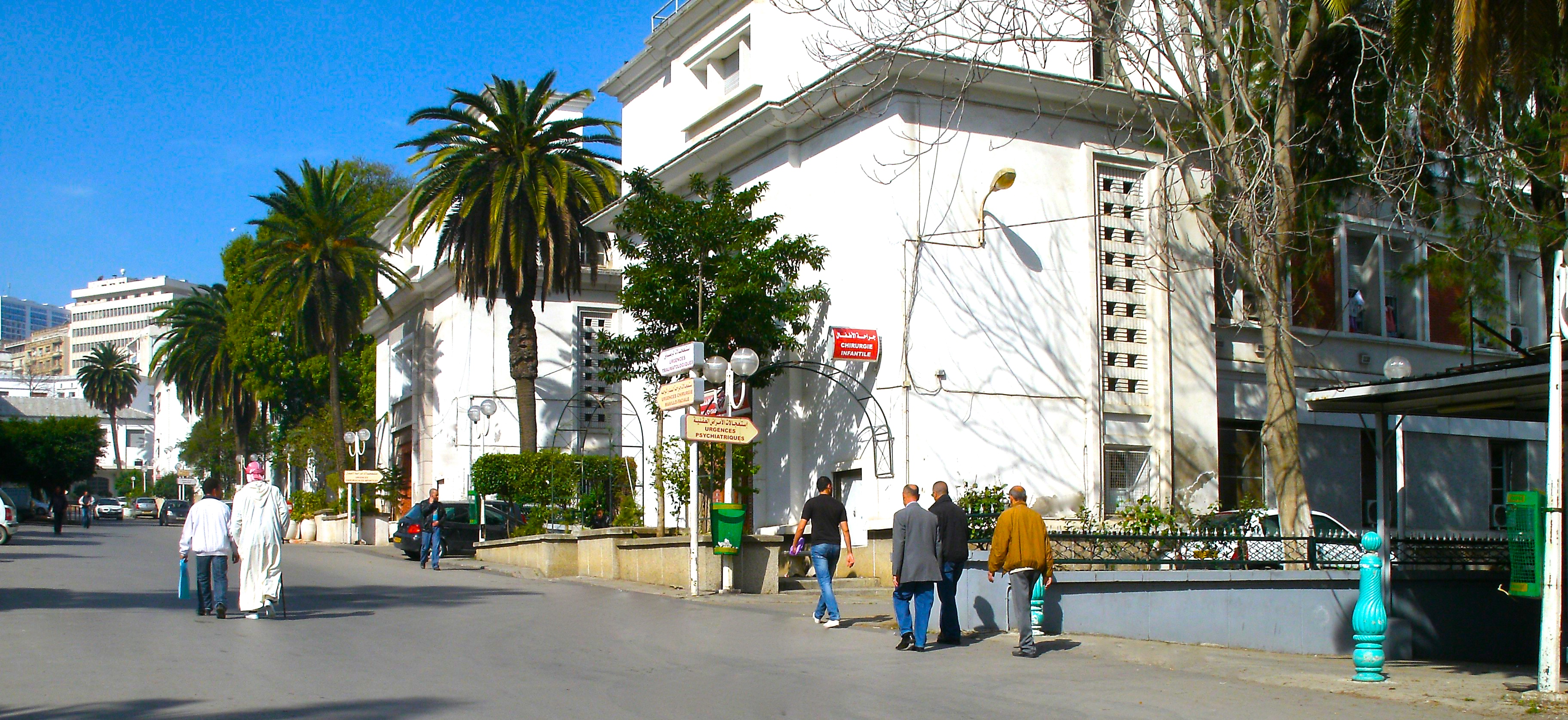
CHU Mustapha Pacha in Algeria

The Algerian Ministry of Health, Population and Hospital Reform maintains 15 public university teaching hospital centres (French: Centre Hospitalo-Universitaire or CHU) with 13,755 beds and one public university hospital (EHU) with 773 beds.

==== Gambia ====
Edward Francis Small Teaching Hospital became a teaching hospital in the 1990s, and offers a 6-year MBBS degree.

==== South Africa ====
Chris Hani Baragwanath Hospital is a teaching hospital affiliated with the University of the Witwatersrand Medical School, and is the third-largest hospital in the world. Another academic hospital, University of Cape Town's Groote Schuur Hospital, was the site of the first human-to-human heart transplant.

=== Asia ===
==== Pakistan ====
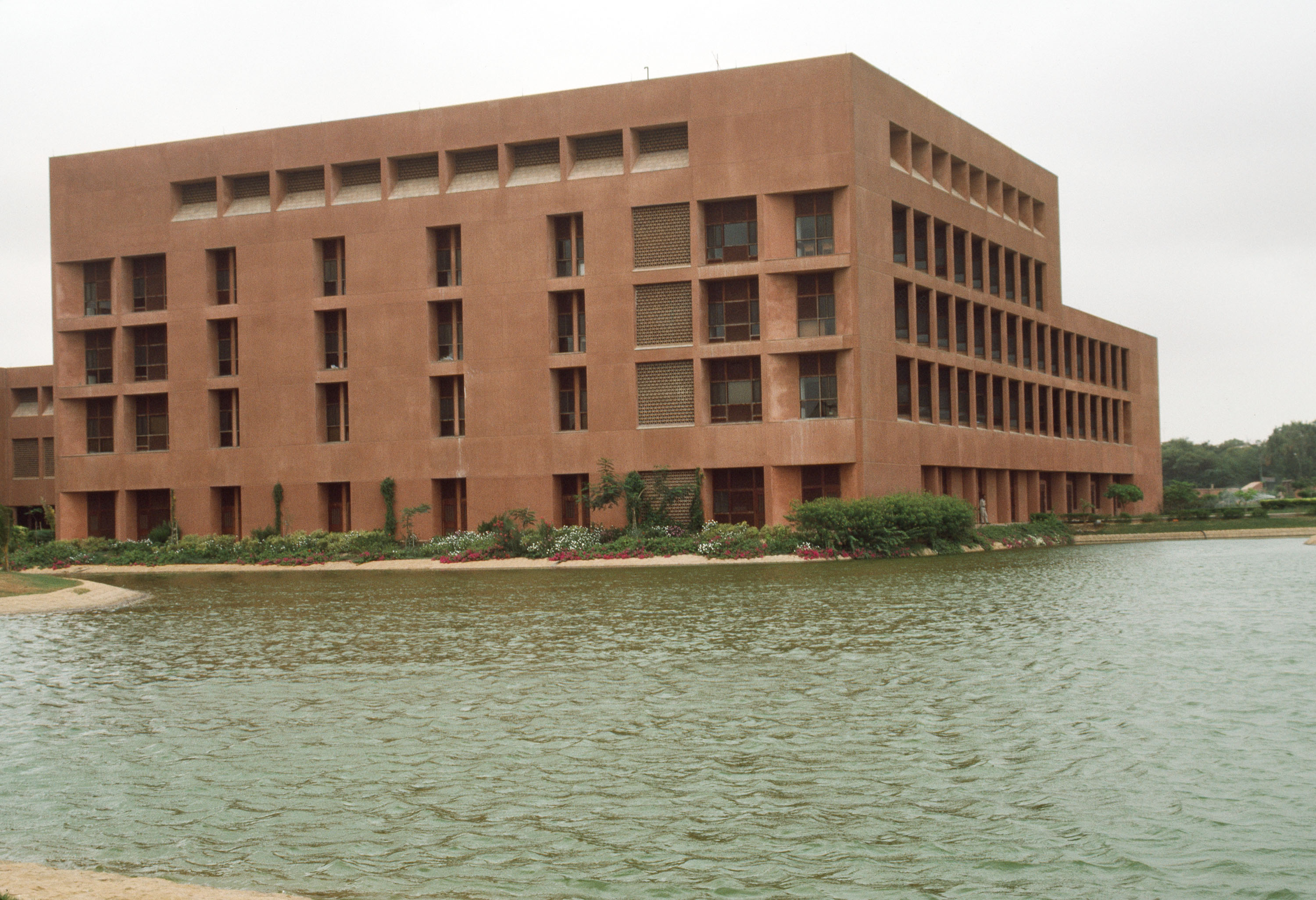
Aga Khan University Hospital, Karachi, Pakistan

Aga Khan University Hospital (Aga Khan Hospital and Medical College) is a 721-bed teaching hospital that trains doctors and hospital administrators with support from American and Canadian universities. The hospital also coordinates a network of over 100 health care units primarily in rural or remote areas.

=== Europe ===
==== France ====
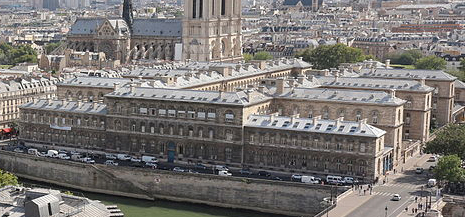
Hôtel-Dieu University Hospital, Paris

In France, teaching hospitals are called "CHU" (Centre hospitalier universitaire). They are regional hospitals with an agreement with one or several universities. Some of the medical staff are both medical practitioners and teachers under the multiple-institution agreement, and receive dual compensation.

There is at least one per French administrative region. In the city of Paris and its suburbs, the Greater Paris region, the local public hospital system, called the Greater Paris University Hospitals (in French: Assistance publique - Hôpitaux de Paris, AP-HP), has an agreement with 5 major universities in Paris. However, it is divided into smaller groups of hospitals and universities:

- Paris Cité University Hospital Group, the largest university hospital complex (GHU) of Greater Paris, with 16 teaching hospitals.
  - Includes Bichat Hospital, Hôtel-Dieu Hospital, etc.
- Sorbonne University Hospital Group, the 2nd largest university hospital complex with 7 teaching hospitals.
  - Includes Pitié-Salpêtrière Hospital, Saint-Antoine Hospital, etc.
- Saclay University Hospital Group (6 teaching hospitals)
  - Includes Bicêtre Hospital, Ambroise-Paré Hospital, etc.
- Henri Mondor University Hospitals, associated with Paris-East Créteil University, with 5 teaching hospitals.
- Paris Seine-Saint-Denis University Hospitals, associated with Sorbonne Paris North University, with 3 teaching hospitals.

There are 32 teaching hospitals in France. Amongst these are 30 university hospitals and only two regional teaching hospitals.

==== Turkey ====
Teaching hospitals (Eğitim ve Araştırma Hastanesi, EAH) in Turkey are owned and operated by the Ministry of Health. Most of those teaching hospitals are affiliated with one or more universities, most of them being under the University of Health Sciences. The UHS is affiliated with 69 hospitals, including city hospitals, throughout the country. Such hospitals are also classified as university hospitals (Üniversite Hastanesi), for the matters relating to the universities.

Hospitals owned and operated by the universities are not called as teaching hospitals, and instead classified as Health Application and Research Centers (Sağlık Uygulama ve Araştırma Merkezi, SUAM) serving the same purpose and funded by the universities' budget. There are also city hospitals (Şehir Hastanesi) operated by private entities under build-operate-transfer contracts. Any public medical schools founded on or after 2010 cannot own or build any university hospitals, forcing them to be affiliated with at least one of the teaching hospitals; however dental schools can own or build one of their own.

=== North America ===
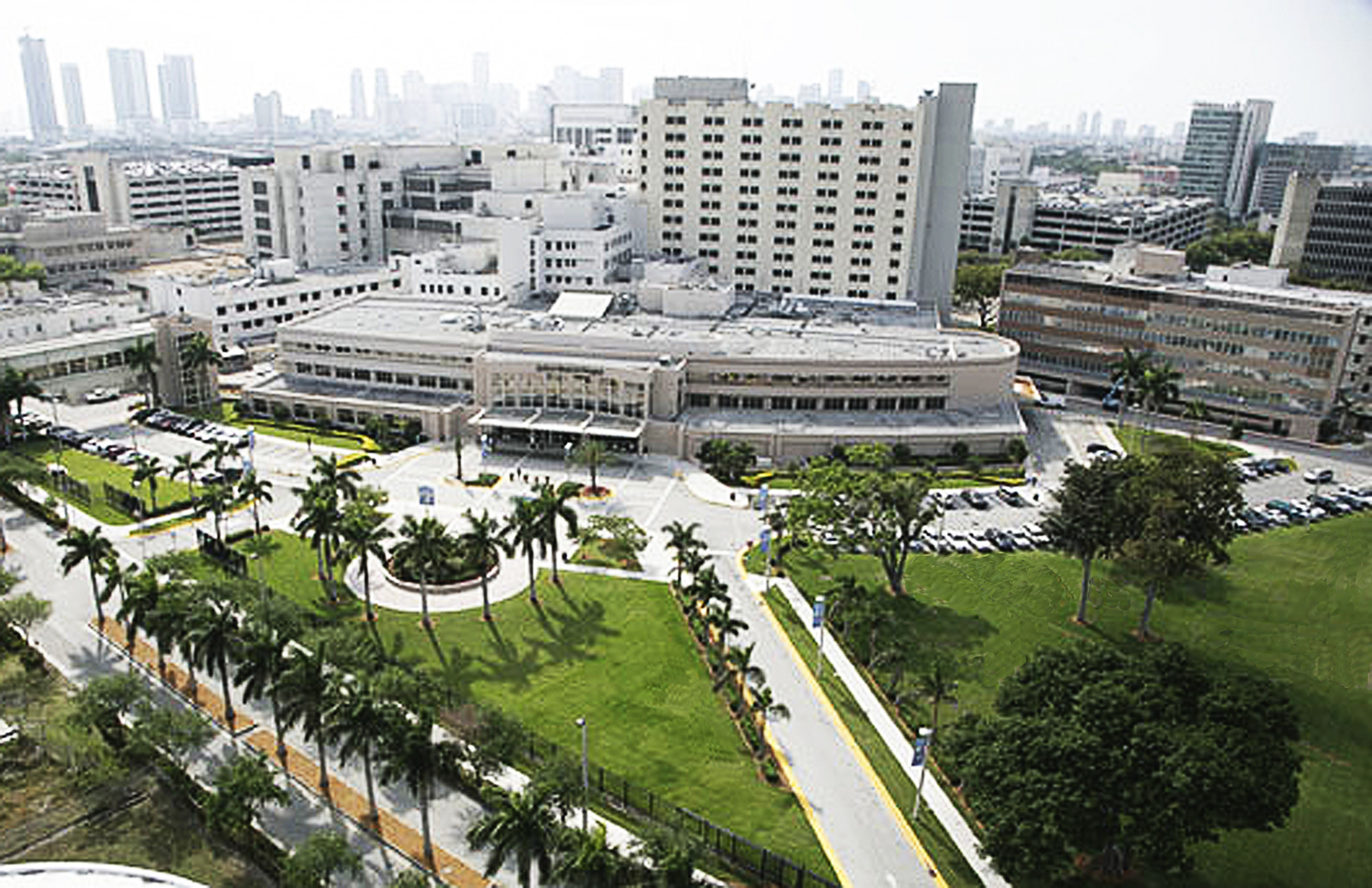
Jackson Memorial Hospital in Miami's Health District, the primary teaching hospital for the University of Miami's Miller School of Medicine and the largest hospital in the United States with 1,547 beds

==== United States ====
The first teaching hospital in the United States was founded at the College of Philadelphia (now the University of Pennsylvania) in 1765, when medical students at the college began taking bedside instruction at the Pennsylvania Hospital (an institution that predated the medical school by several years). Following that were King's College of New York in 1768, Harvard University in 1783, Dartmouth College in 1798, and Yale University in 1810 to begin the history of notable university-affiliated teaching hospitals in America.

Teaching hospitals rose to prevalence in the United States beginning in the early 1900s, largely resembling the model established by Johns Hopkins University, the University of Pennsylvania and the Lakeside Hospital in Cleveland. All were very large, technologically sophisticated and aimed to have a global impact through both patient care and scientific research. Additionally, these hospitals had large patient bases, abundant financial resources, and renowned physicians, advisors and staff. Many of these medical schools associated with a nearby hospital were private institutions that received philanthropic support.

While some funding comes from Medicaid for the GME process, teaching hospitals must consider paying residents and fellows within their budgets. These additional costs vary between hospitals based on funding by Medicaid and their general salary for residents and fellows. Despite these costs, they are often offset by the prices of procedures, which are elevated in comparison to most non-teaching hospitals. Teaching hospitals often justify this additional cost factor by boasting that their quality of care rises above non-teaching hospitals, or assuring the patient that they are improving the medicine of the future by having their procedure done with medical trainees present.

=== Oceania ===
==== Australia ====
According to the Medical Journal of Australia, Australian teaching hospitals typically receive less funding for research than they do in similarly situated countries. The late 1800s and early 1900s saw several attempts at instituting a teaching hospital to be affiliated with a medical school, but plans fell through until 1928, when Royal Prince Alfred Hospital became Australia's first teaching hospital, to educate students of the University of Sydney.

== See also ==
- List of university hospitals
- History of hospitals
