= Ankara Bilkent City Hospital =

Geography
- Location: Bilkent, Çankaya, Ankara, Turkey
- Coordinates: 39°54′03″N 32°45′25″E

Organisation
- Type: General

Services
- Beds: 3,704

Helipads
- Helipad: Yes

History
- Founded: 14 March 2019; 7 years ago

Links
- Lists: Hospitals in Turkey

Ankara Bilkent City Hospital (Turkish: Ankara Bilkent Şehir Hastanesi) is a full-service city hospital located in Ankara, Turkey. Opened in 2019, it is the biggest in the country having a total of 3,704 hospital beds.

== History ==
Financing of the hospital in amount of €890 million was provided by eight domestic and foreign banks. Groundbreaking took place with a ceremony held on 18 September 2013. Construction began in 2015. It was built in public–private partnership (PPP). Parts of the hospital went into service in October 2018. It was officially opened on 14 March 2019. It is the second city hospital in Ankara after Etlik City Hospital. Between February and May 2019, Ankara Atatürk Training and Research Hospital, Türkiye Yüksek İhtisas Training and Research Hospital, and Ankara Numune Training and Research Hospital were closed, and their patients, medical equipment, and staff were transferred to Ankara Bilkent City Hospital.

== Characteristics ==
The city hospital is located at Bilkent quarter in Çankaya district of Ankara. The hospital campus stretches over a land of 180 daa (0.18 km^{2}; 0.069 sq mi).

It has 131 operating rooms, 904 polyclinics and 3,704 hospital beds in 82 rooms for VIP, 1,554 single bed rooms, 725 double bed rooms and 700 intensive care units. The dialysis clinic has 38 beds. When in full capacity, it will receive 30,000 patients and treat 8,000 emergency patients per day. The hospital serves in cardiac surgery, neurology, oncology, orthopedic surgery, physical treatment & rehabilitation and general branches. It is one of the nine city hospitals and the biggest in the country. The hospital campus features also a 100-bed hotel as medical observation clinic. The campus features two helipads for landing of ambulance helicopters carrying airlifted patients.

Hospital bed capacity
Hospital	Beds
Main Hospital	66
General Hospital	562
Cardiovascular diseases Hospital	441
Neurology and Orthopedy Hospital	506
Children's Hospital	599
Maternity Hospital	542
Oncology Hospital	588
Physical medicine and rehabilitation Hospital	300
High security Forensic psychiatry Hospital	100
Total	3,704

About 2,700 academicians, physicians and surgeons, 6,300 health care personnel and 4,000 administrative and support personnel are employed in the hospital.

== See also ==
- Başakşehir Çam and Sakura City Hospital, Istanbul
- Ankara Etlik City Hospital, Ankara
