= Ankara Etlik City Hospital =

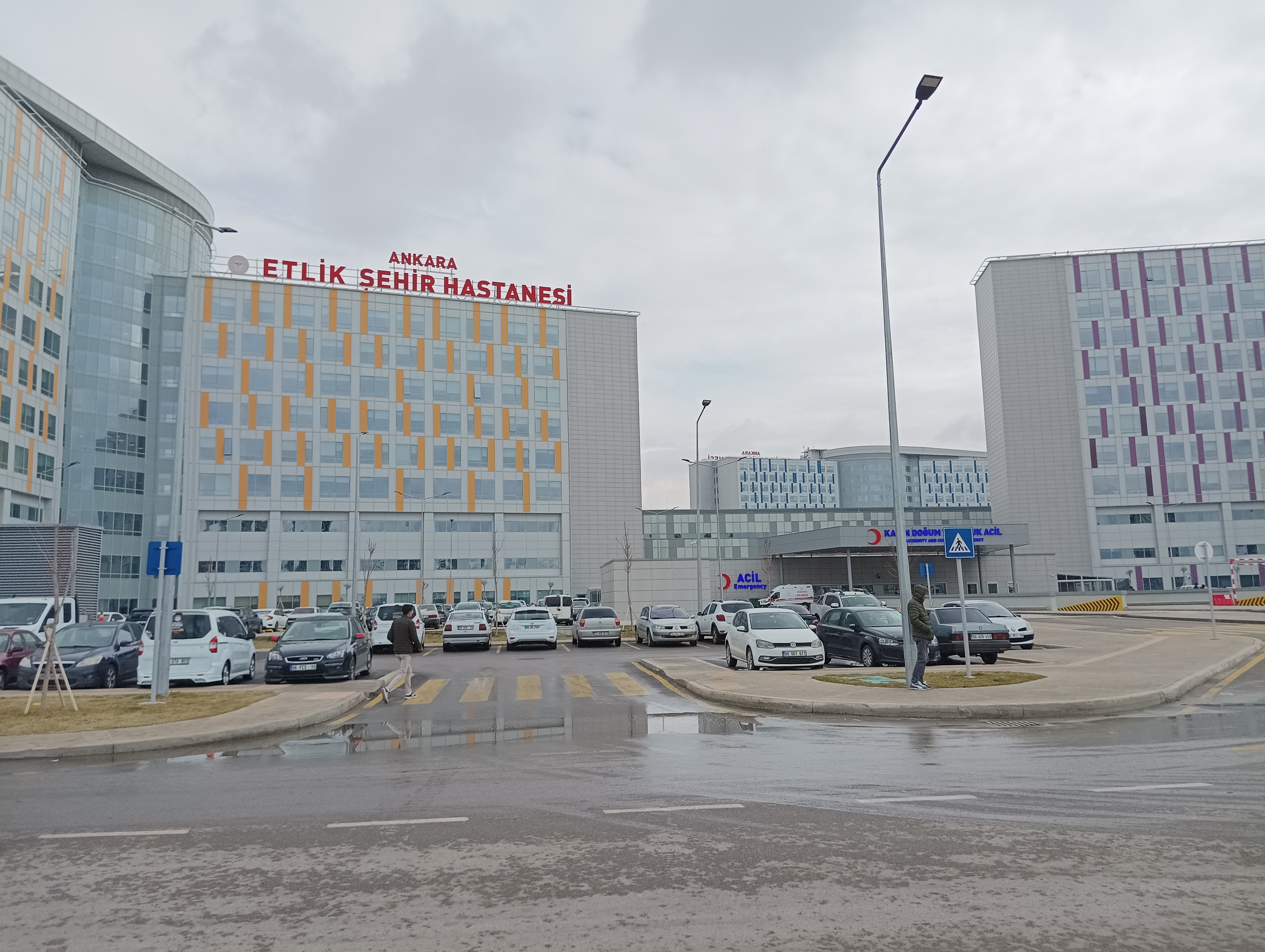

Geography
- Location: Etlik, Keçiören, Ankara, Turkey
- Coordinates: 39°57′51″N 32°49′44″E

History
- Founded: 28 September 2022

Links
- Website: https://etliksehir.saglik.gov.tr/
- Lists: Hospitals in Turkey

Ankara Etlik City Hospital (Turkish: Ankara Etlik Şehir Hastanesi) is a hospital located in the Etlik neighbourhood of Ankara, Turkey. The groundbreaking ceremony was held on 22 October 2013.

== History ==
Ankara Etlik City Hospital was planned as part of Turkey's city hospital infrastructure development program initiated in 2005. The groundbreaking ceremony for the hospital took place on 22 October 2013. In July 2019, construction workers went on strike due to unpaid wages, reportedly halting the progress of the project. Construction resumed in January 2021.

On 17 August 2022, several hospitals were transferred to Etlik City Hospital, including Etlik Zübeyde Hanım Maternity and Women's Hospital, Dr. Abdurrahman Yurtaslan Oncology Hospital, Dışkapı Yıldırım Beyazıt Training and Research Hospital, Dr. Sami Ulus Maternity and Children's Health Hospital, and Ulucanlar Eye Training and Research Hospital. The hospital was officially inaugurated on 28 September 2022 by President Recep Tayyip Erdoğan.

== Facilities ==
The complex consists of nine buildings:

1. General hospital
2. Orthopedic and neurological sciences hospital
3. Cardiovascular surgery hospital
4. Paediatrics hospital
5. Gynecology hospital
6. Oncology hospital
7. Diagnosis and treatment building
8. Physical therapy and rehabilitation hospital
9. High security forensic psychiatry hospital

== Criticism ==
One of the concerns over city hospitals is the closure of other hospitals. Some argue that new shopping malls or more profitable buildings will be built after shutting down the hospitals. Another concern is the lack of infrastructure, where the complexes will be built. Some argue that the roads are insufficient to carry the traffic of so many people.

== See also ==
- Ankara Bilkent City Hospital
