= List of former military hospitals in Turkey =

This is an incomplete list of former military hospitals in Turkey.

In 2016 there were 32 military hospitals and one rehabilitation centre spread across 26 provinces. All were closed or transferred to the Ministry of Health after 2016 Turkish coup attempt. In October 2025 it was announced that plans were being drawn up to return the Gülhane Teaching and Research Hospital (formerly the Gülhane Military Medical Academy) to military control. The Turkish military has operated a military hospital in Northern Cyprus since 2024 to provide for the garrison there.

== Ankara ==
- Ankara Gülhane Askeri Tıp Akademisi
- Ankara Mevki Asker Hastanesi
- Etimesgut Hava Hastanesi

== Balıkesir ==
- Balıkesir Asker Hastanesi
- Edremit Asker Hastanesi

== Diyarbakır ==
- Diyarbakır Asker Hastanesi

== Erzurum ==
- Mareşal Çakmak Asker Hastanesi

== Eskişehir ==
- Eskişehir Hava Hastanesi

== Istanbul ==
- GATA Haydarpaşa Eğitim Hastanesi
- Gümüşsuyu Asker Hastanesi
- Kasımpaşa Deniz Hastanesi

== İzmir ==
- Güzelyalı Hava Hastanesi, Üçkuyular
- İzmir Mevki Asker Hastanesi, Hatay

== İzmit|Kocaeli ==
- Gölcük Deniz Hastanesi

== Tekirdağ ==
- Çorlu Asker Hastanesi
