= District 5 (Tehran) =

Mantaqeye 5 منطقه پنج
- District 5
- Interactive map of Mantaqeye 5
- Country: Iran
- Province: Tehran Province

Government
  - Mayor: Mohammad-Reza Pouriafar

Area
  - Total: 5,420 ha (13,400 acres)

Population
  - Total: 856,565

District 5 (Persian: منطقه ۵, romanized: Mantaqeye 5) is one of 22 central districts of Tehran County in Tehran Province, Iran. This district is limited to Kan River and lands of District 22 in the west and to Mohammad Ali Jenah and Ashrafi Esfahani highways in the east. At the 2010 census, its population was 793,750, in 255,333 families.

== Geography ==
District 5 of Tehran Municipality is located in northwest of the capital. The northern part of this municipal district is located on the height of the western slopes of Alborz Mountains and its southern part is in the neighborhood of Karaj Special Road.

=== Neighborhoods ===
The most famous neighborhoods of District 5 are Somin Bolivar, Farahzad, Kan and Sooleqan, Bagh-e Feyz, Poonak, Shahran, Ferdows, Ariya-Shahr and ekbatan.

== Areal details ==
The District 5 divided in seven regions and seventeen neighborhoods.

Area	Population	km^{2}	Seat (Location)	Mayor	Ref
1	77,203	6.2	Shahr-e ziba	(Persian:علیرضا فاطمی نیک)	
2	55,549	6.8	Shahr-e ziba	(Persian:محمد اسدالهی)	
3	-	35.1	Ashrafi Esfahani Expressway	(Persian:علیرضا غفارخانی)	
4	-	35.1	Ayatollah Kashani Expressway	(Persian:مریم تراشی)	
5	-	1.485	Ayatollah Kashani Expressway	(Persian:رضا علیزمانی)	
6	-	-	Ekbatan Town	(Persian:سمانه عبدالهی)	
7	186,988	8	Shahid Sattari Expressway	(Persian:امیر نجف نژاد)	
