= Sa'adat Abad =

Neighborhood in Tehran

Coordinates: 35°46′55″N 51°22′30″E

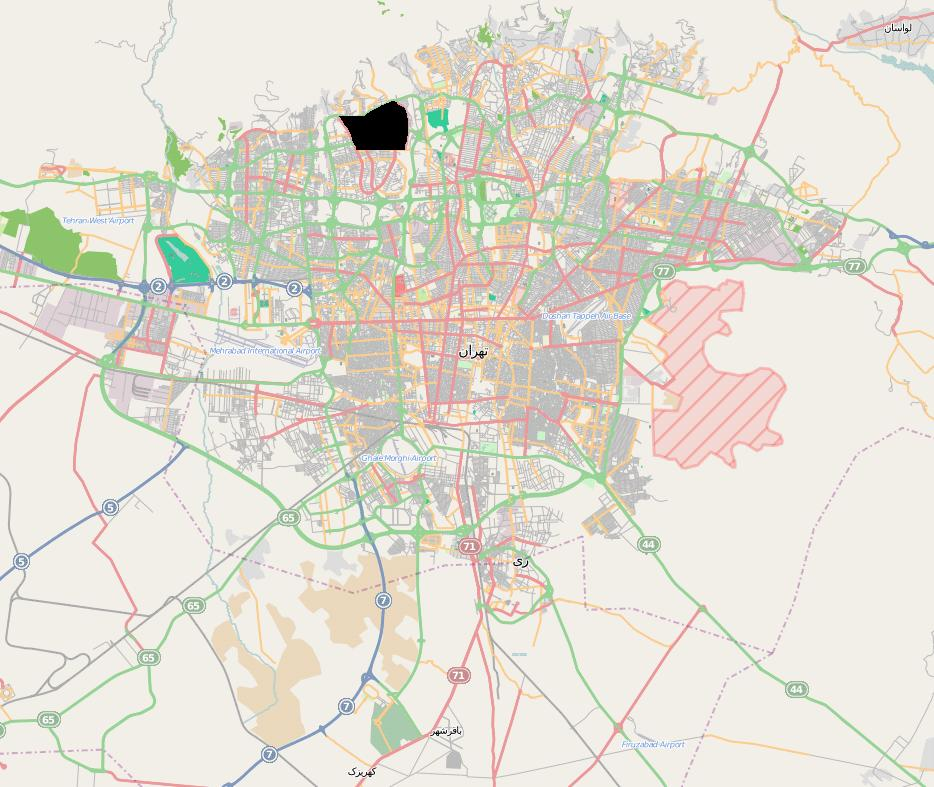
Sa'adat Abad in Tehran map (in black)

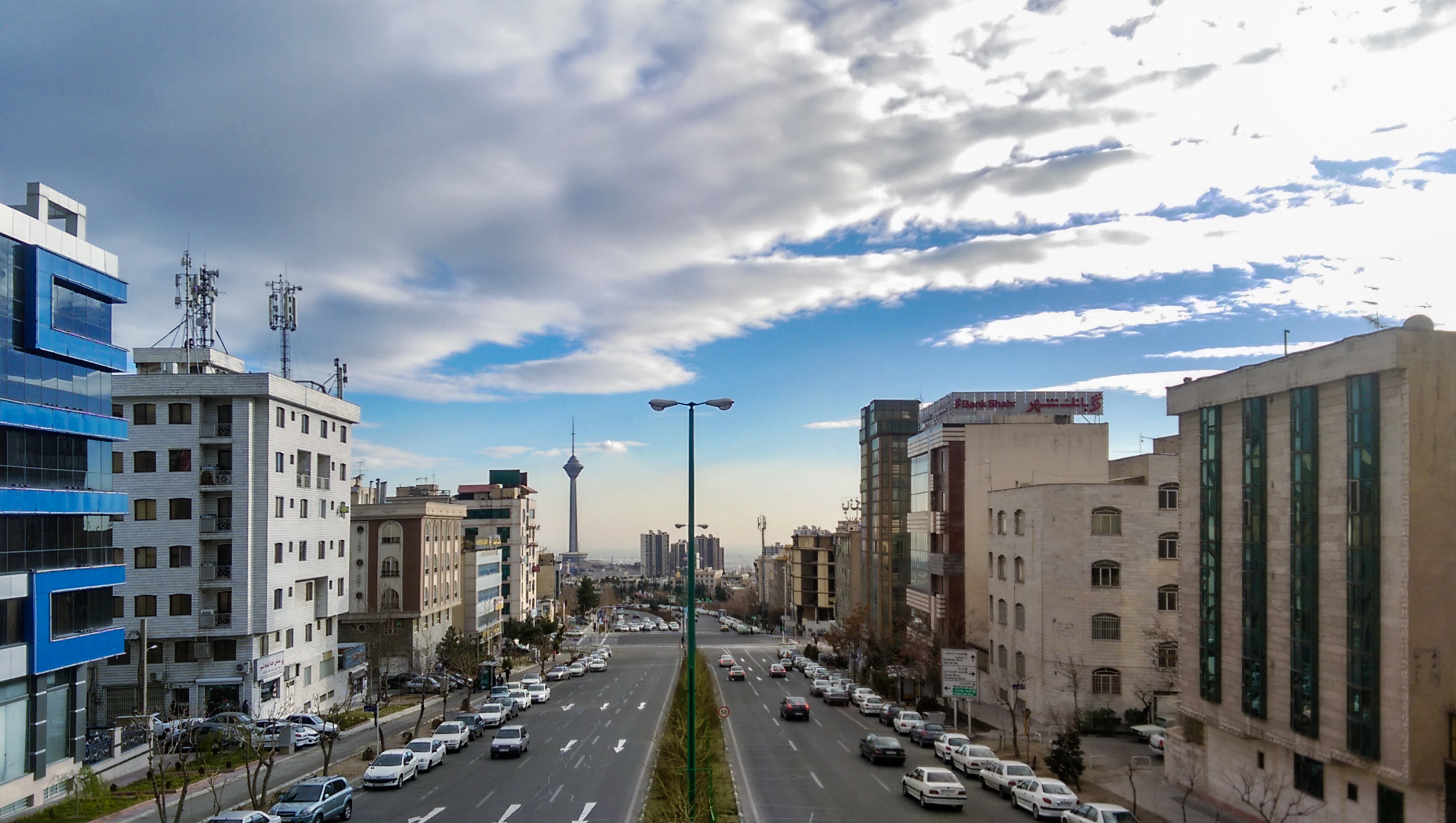
A boulevard in Sa'adat Abad

Sa'adat Abad (Persian: سعادت‌آباد Sa'âdat Âbâd) is a wealthy district located in northern Tehran. The texture of the neighborhood is modern. Most of the main and secondary streets are wide and have been designed and implemented based on urban standard principles and in a modern style. The number of private and government companies in this region is not significant. Sa'adat Abad district is known to have better air quality and lower levels of air pollution. Another attractive feature that encourages people to buy a property in Sa'adat Abad is the lack of traffic restrictions in Tehran.

Located in Sa'adat Abad is the Tehran International School (Boys Section), located in Farhang square. The school has about two hundred students and is a registered IB (International Baccalaureate School).

== See also ==
- Evin
- Velenjak
- Almahdi
- Punak
