= Velenjak =

Neighbourhood in Tehran, Iran

- Neighborhood of Tehran
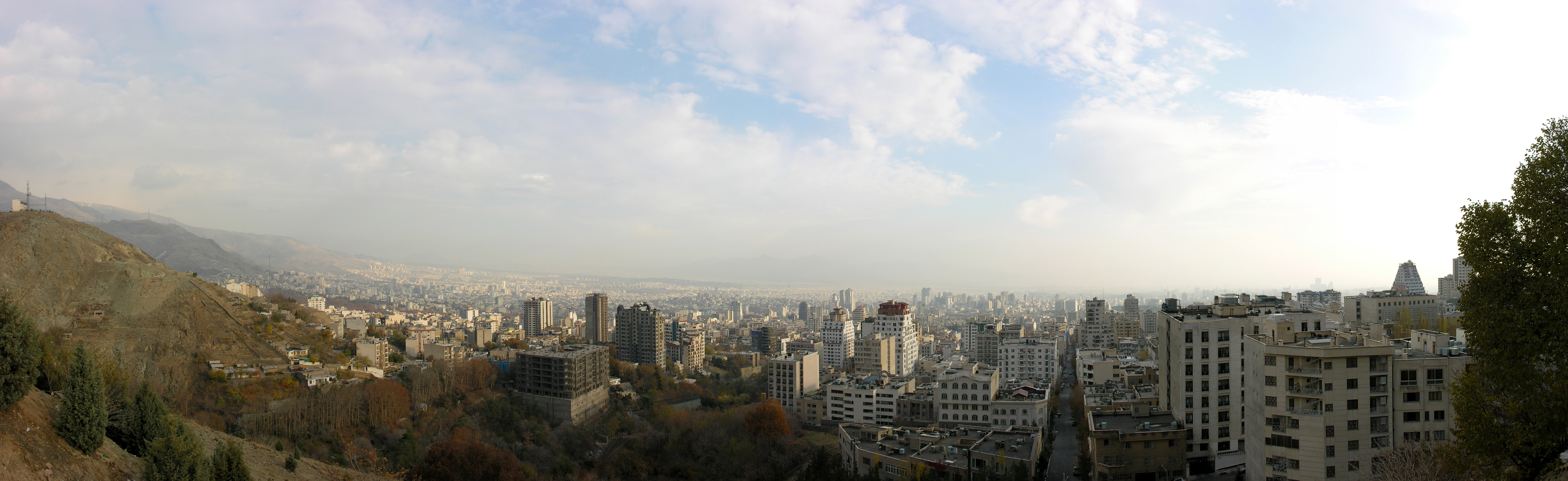
- A view of Tehran, in the foreground is the Velenjak neighborhood.
- Interactive map of Velenjak
- Coordinates: 35°49′N 51°24′E
- Country: Iran
- Province: Tehran province
- City: Tehran
- Area code: (+98) 021

Velenjak (Persian: ولنجک) is an affluent neighbourhood in the northwest of Tehran, Iran. Velenjak (also called the Roof of Tehran) is located in the Shemiran area in the northernmost part of Tehran, on the slopes of the Alborz mountain range. It is known for its landscapes, mild climate, mountain air, springs, and wildlife.

Velenjak houses many foreign residents, particularly people of South Korean descent who work in the finance and industrial firms throughout Tehran. Many embassies are located in Velenjak, including the embassies of Brunei, Côte d'Ivoire, Malaysia, Serbia and Montenegro, Algeria, and numerous ambassadorial residences. Shahid Beheshti University and Shahid Beheshti University of Medical Sciences, are also located in this area.

Beheshti University is located in Velenjak. It is known for its engineering program. The university also has Natural Sciences, Humanities, and Social Science programs.

== Culture ==
=== Mode and fashion ===
People of Velenjak usually follow global fashion rather than the fashion of Iran. Also, This neighbourhood has hosted many Iranian fashion events.

=== Food ===
This neighborhood is a place where one can enjoy Iranian food. There are high-end cafes and restaurants in Velenjak, both modern and classic, serving both Iranian and cosmopolitan cuisine.

=== Sports ===
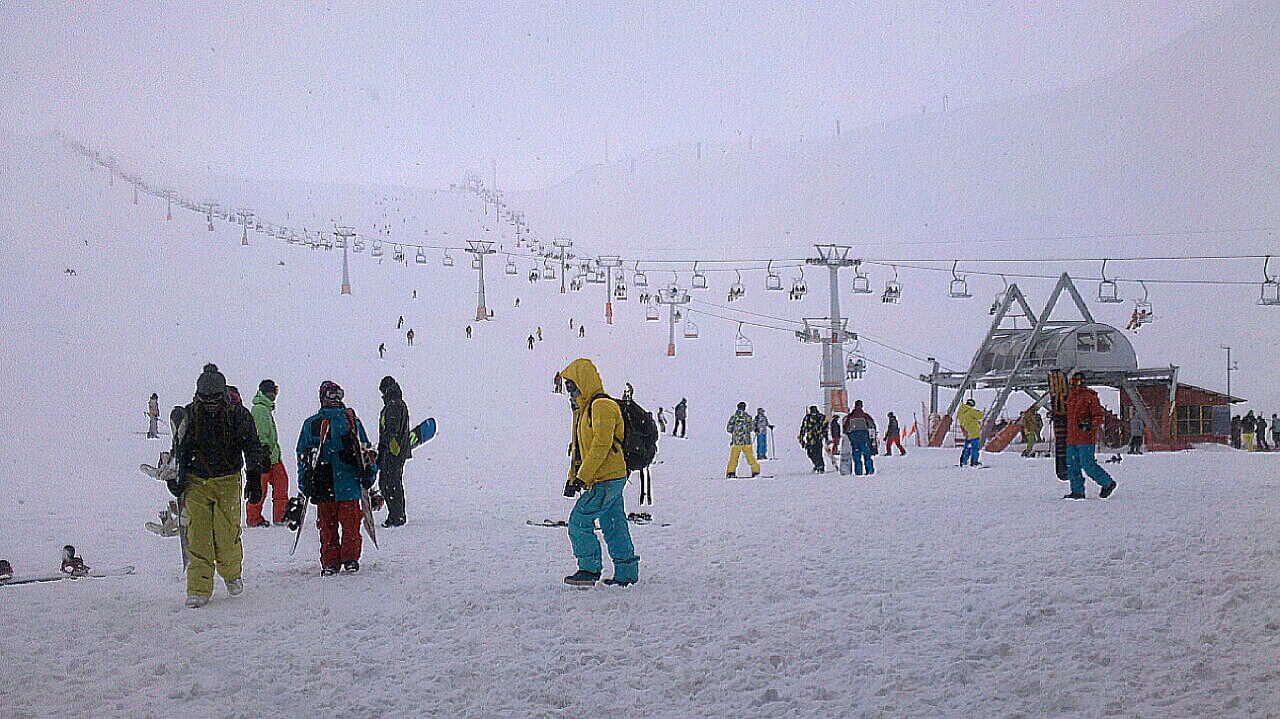
Tochal Complex in 2013

There are many modern sports facilities in Velenjak but Tochal Complex is known as the neighbourhood's most popular sports venue. Velenjak is located adjacent to the Tochal Complex, a ski resort area with a gondola lift up to Mount Tochal. Tochal is one of the biggest tourist destinations in the Alborz Mountains adjacent to Velenjak. People walk up Tochal during the night time, it has many restaurants and coffee shops, with views of the city from the top.

=== Music ===
The singer Benyamin Bahadori has stated that he is from Velenjak in an interview with Radio Javan.

== See also ==
- Tochal
- Saadat Abad
- Almahdi
- Elahiyeh
- Qolhak
