= Tochal Complex =

Consists of three resorts for ice skating

Tochal Complex (Persian: منطقه نمونه گردشگری توچال) consists of recreational and sports facilities on Mount Tochal in Velenjak, in the northernmost part of Tehran.

== Tochal Telecabin (gondola lift) ==
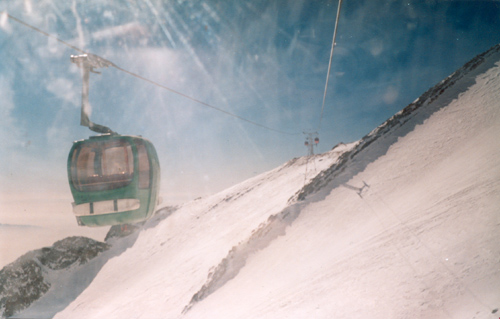
Tochal Telecabin

Tochal Telecabin is one of the world's longest gondola lift lines, with a length of 7500 m. The project started in 1974 by Bahman Batmanghelidj and associates and has been open to the public since 1978. It starts at the Velenjak Valley, north of Tehran, at an altitude of 1900 m, and ends at the last station at an altitude of 3740 m, near the main ridge of Mount Tochal. The gondola lift is used to access ski resorts and other recreational centres on the mountain. The upgraded safety standards of the lines allow families and athletes to enjoy the ride and the other facilities.

== Tochal Ski Resort & Tochal tennis academy ==
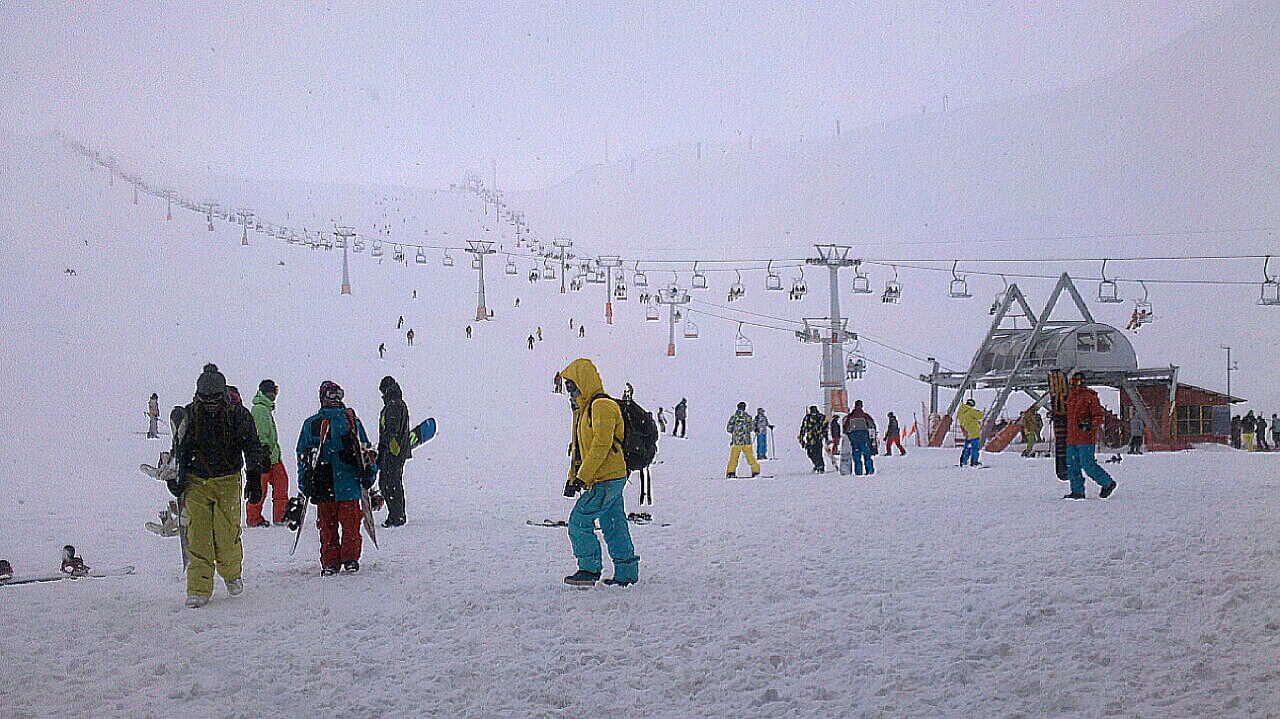
Tochal Skiing resort

The main ski slopes are located in Station 7:

Peak: This slope starts from the foot of Tochal (at 3850 m) and ends at the hotel (at 3550 m).

Western Foothill: This slope is on the western foothill of the Tochal Mountain. The length of the ski slope is 900 m, the peak being 3,750 metres m is high and the lowest spot, Tochal Hotel, is 3550 metres high. A Poma chairlift is on this slope for skiers.

== Tochal Hotel ==
The Tochal Hotel is 3550 m above sea level. It is near Mount Tochal and weather-permitting, it takes about an hour to hit the peak.The hotel has near 30 different rooms, a restaurant, entertainment facilities, coffee shop and other facilities.

== Pictures ==
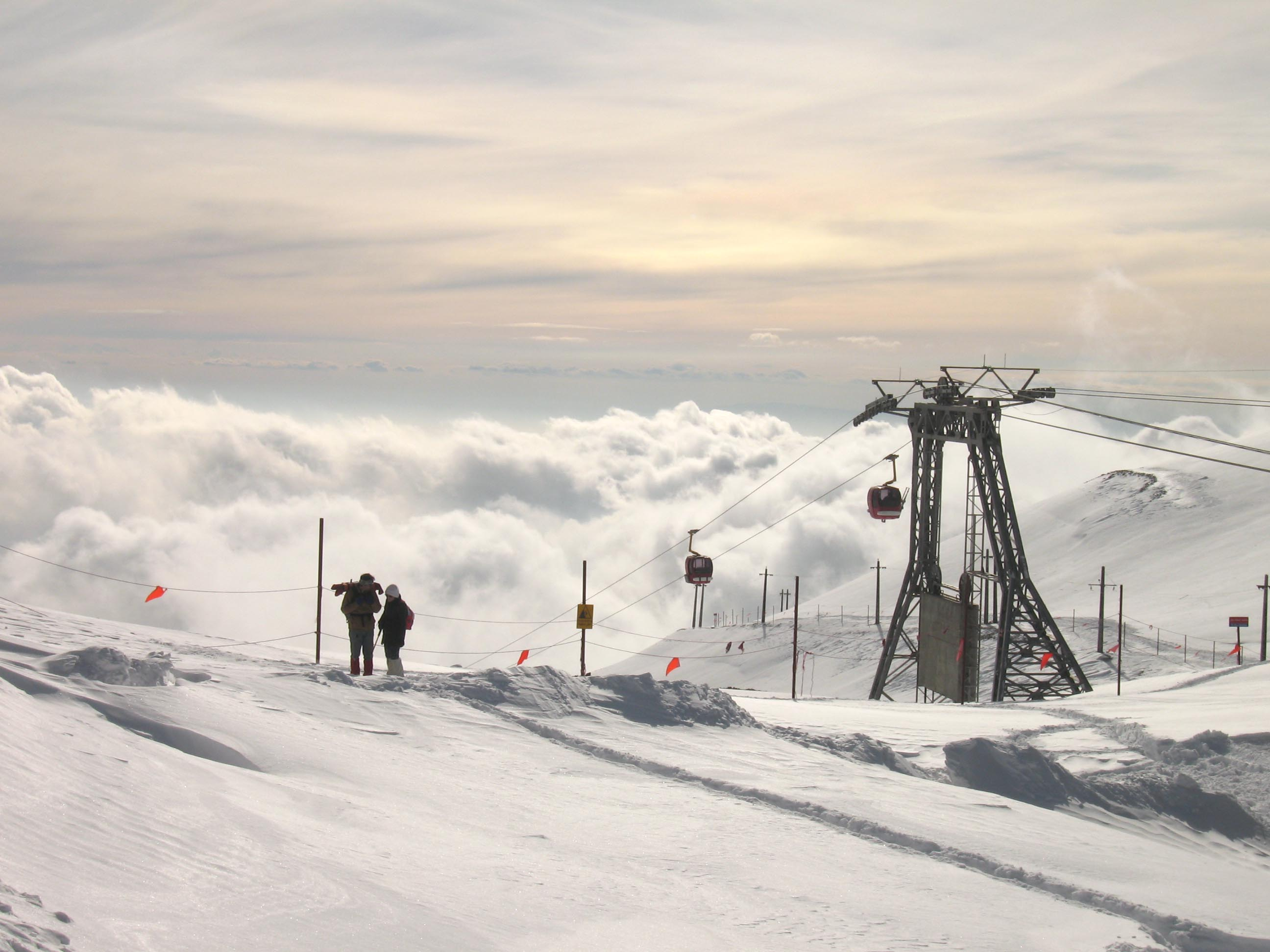
7th Station; Tehran above the clouds.

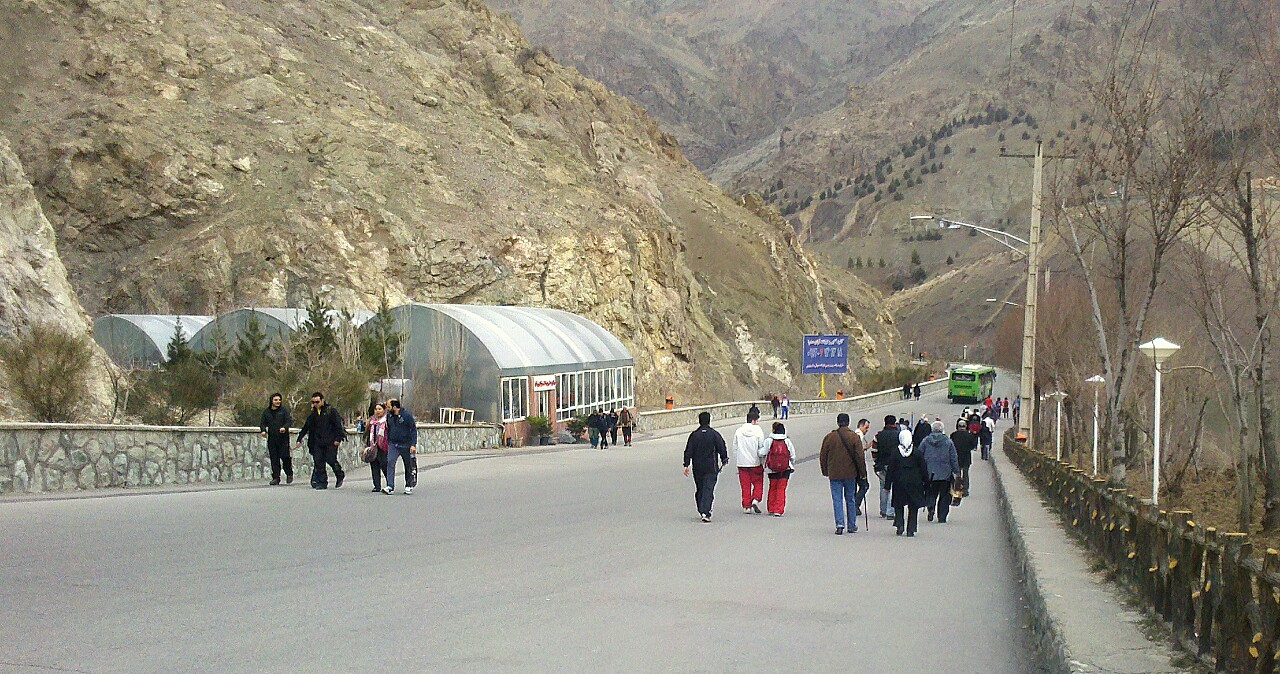
Pedestrians near the entrance to the complex.

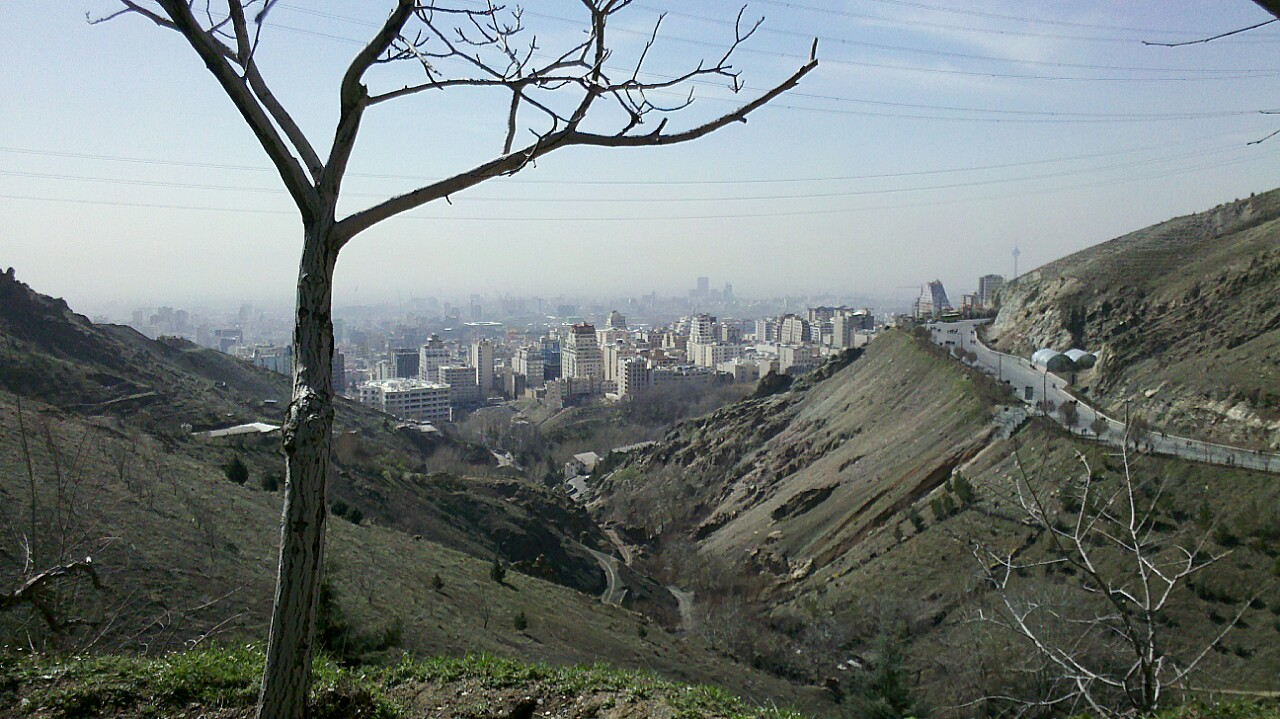
View of Tehran from complex.

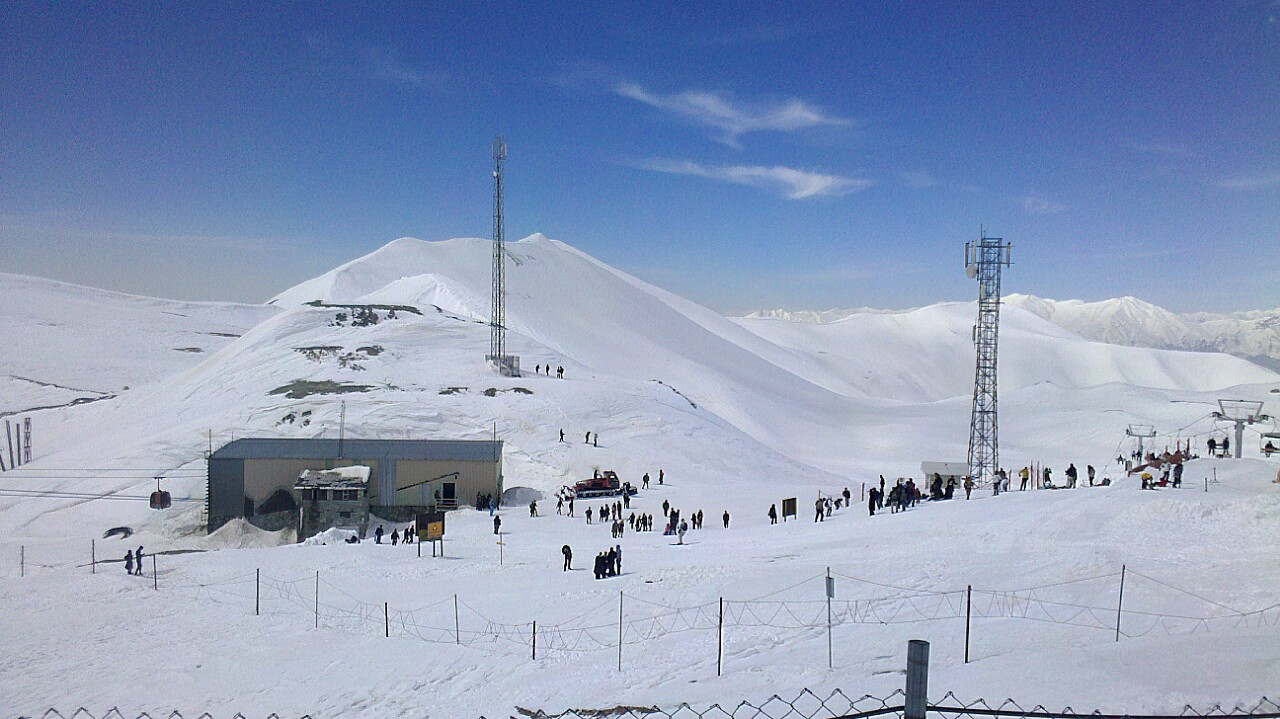
7th Station and Skiing resort.

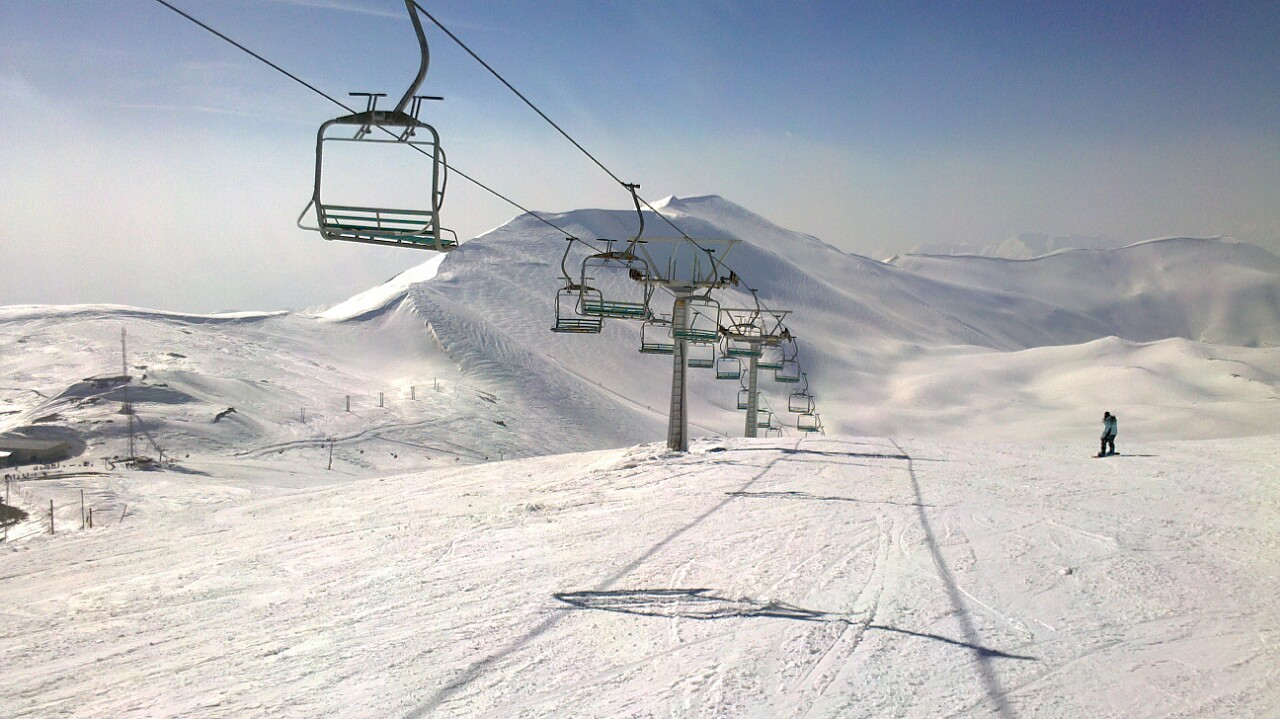
Skiing resort.

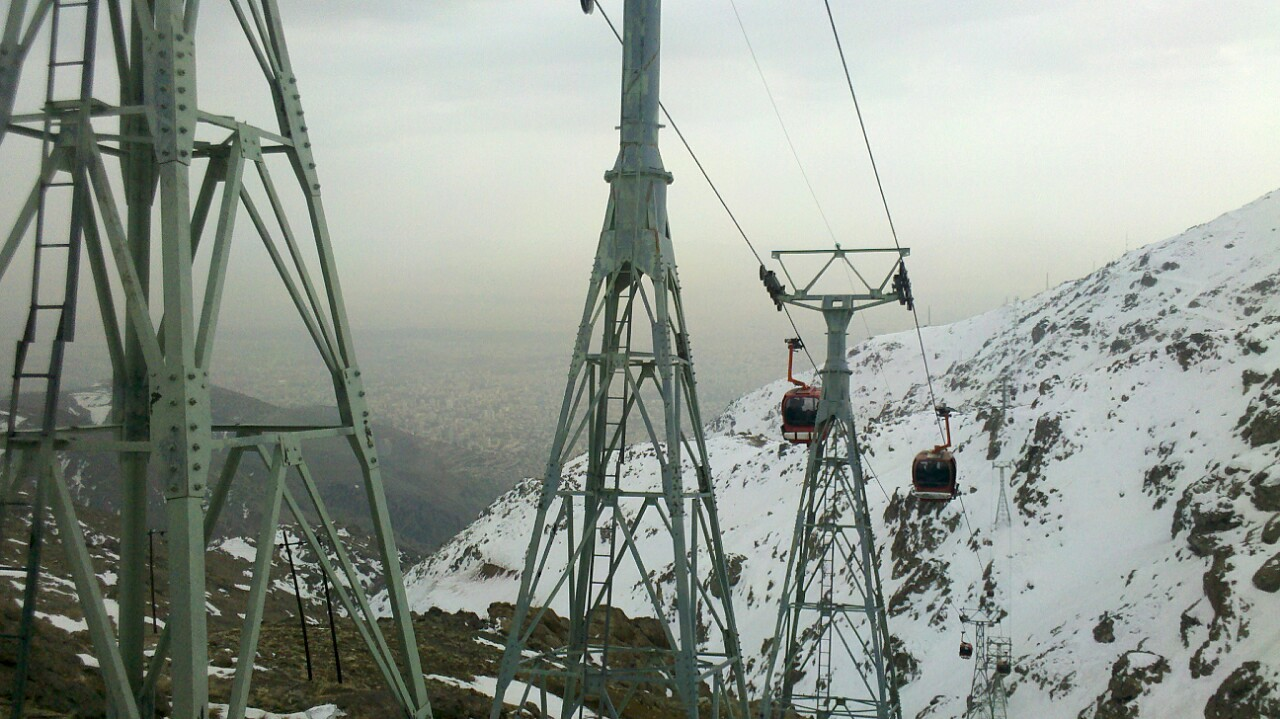
Telecabin between 5th and 7th station.

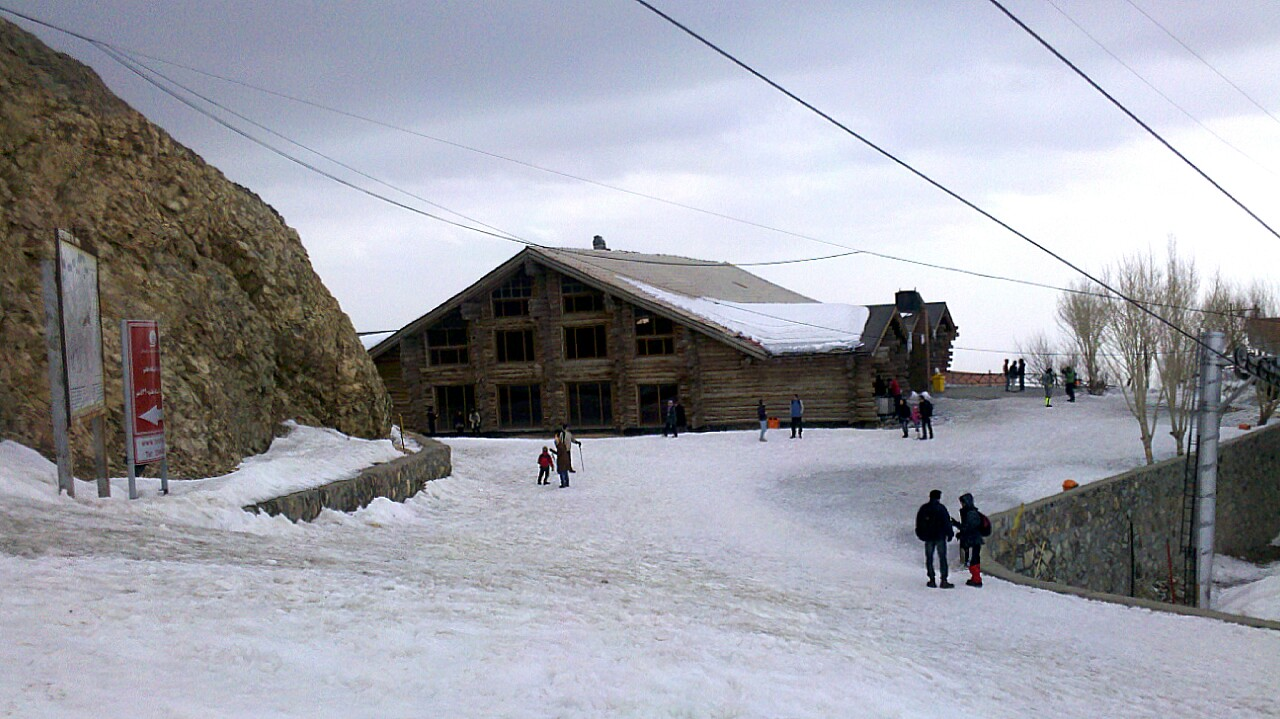
Hotel in 5th station.

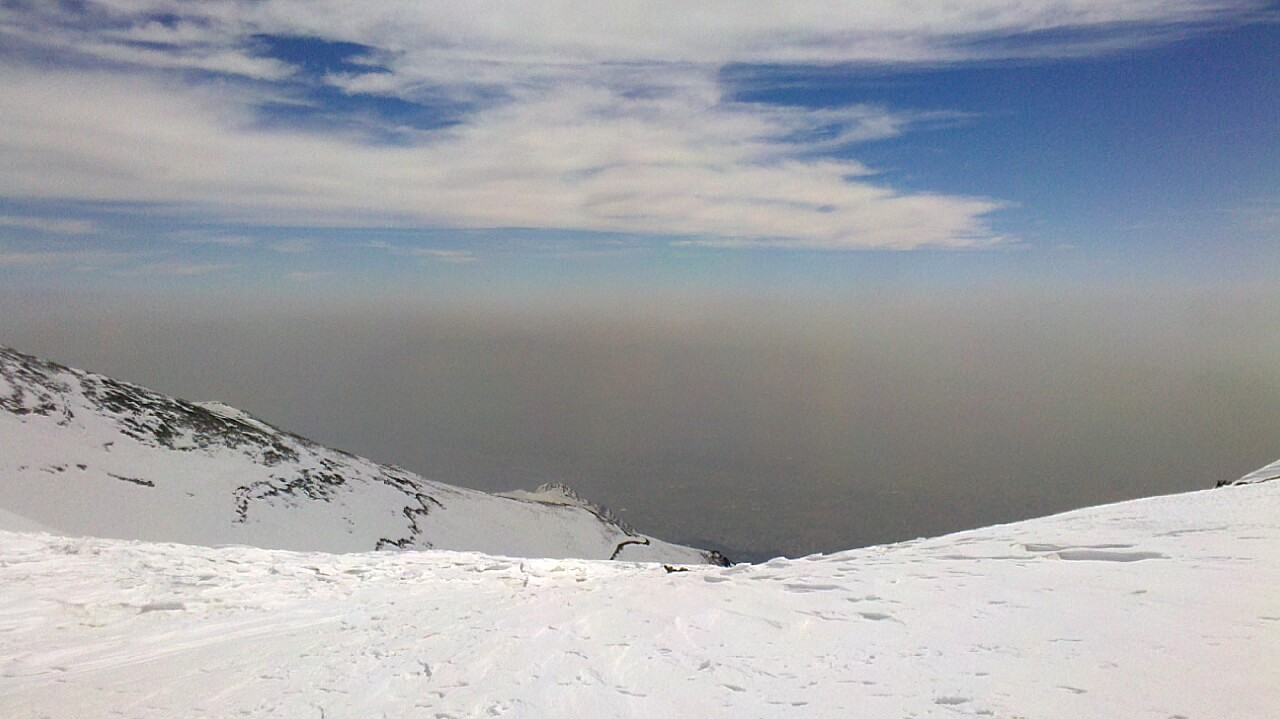
View of Tehran's polluted air from 7th station.

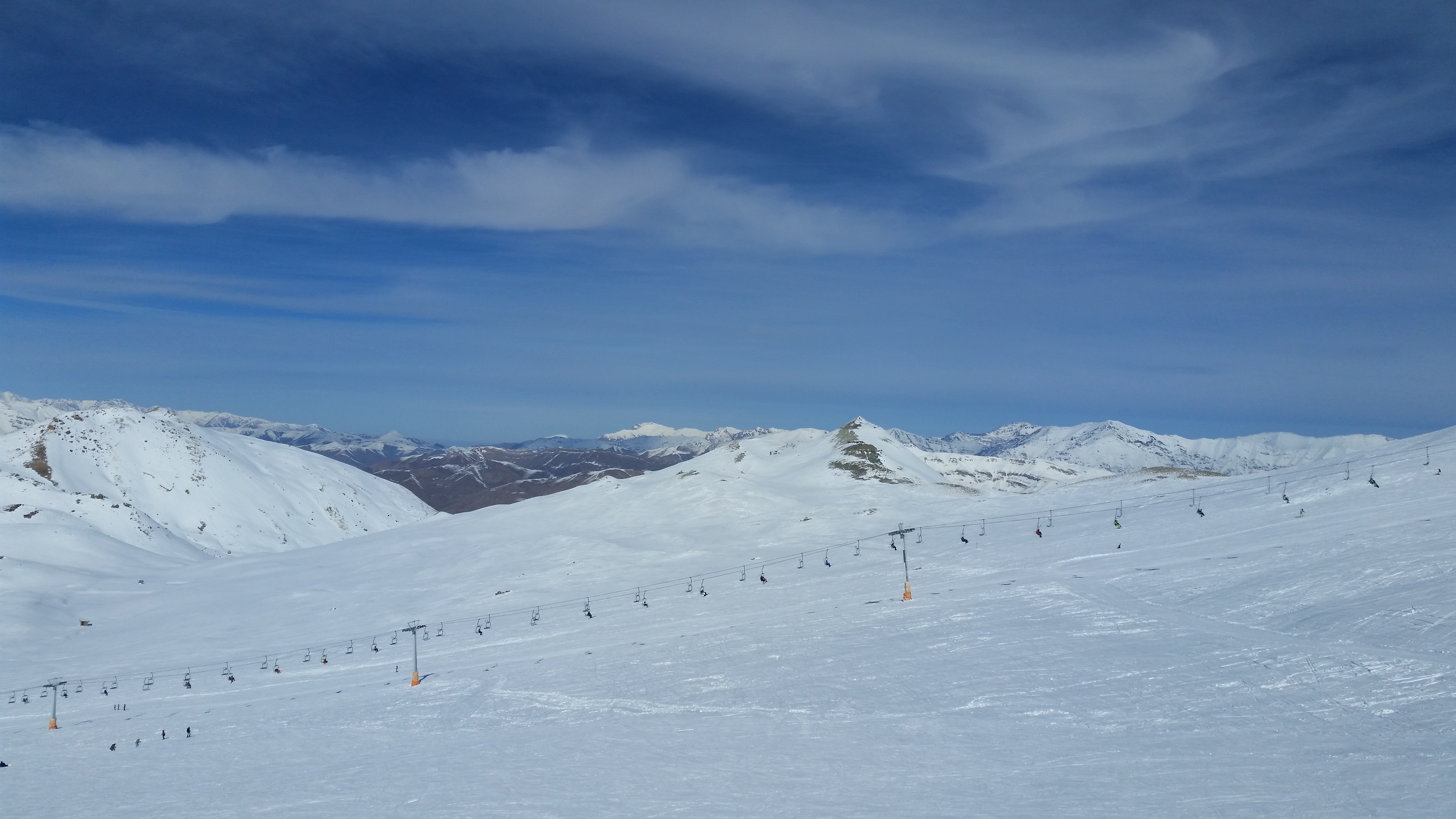
Detachable chairlift and Skiing resort in the 7th Station.

== See also ==
- List of gondola lifts
- List of aerial tramways
- List of ski areas and resorts in Iran
