= Tehran International School =

International school in Tehran, Iran

Coordinates: 35.7841°N 51.3855°E

Information
- Established: 1985; 41 years ago
- Gender: Boys and Girls, educated separately
- Website: www1.taischool.ir (main website); www2.tisschool.com (boys' school website); www2.tissch.ir (girls' school website)

Tehran International & Adaptive School (TIS) is an international school located in North Tehran, Iran. It consists of three campuses: girls, boys elementary and boys grade 7–12. The school offers the International Baccalaureate's IB Diploma Programme. Boys attend school in Saadat Abad, while girls attend school in Shahrak-e Gharb. There are two divisions per school: an international school for non-Iranians, which consists of mainly an ex-patriate student body (it enrols very few Iranian nationals); and an adaptive school for Iranians returning from abroad who need to re-adjust to the Iranian educational system.

It was established in 1985 under the Education Ministry of Iran.

== Operations ==
Boys in the international school are expected to wear light blue collared shirts and dark blue trousers as part of their school uniform, while boys in the re-adaptive school are expected to wear blue collared shirts and dark blue trousers. Girls are expected to wear manto with maghnaeh.
