= Simon Bolivar, Tehran =

Simon Bolivar سیمون بولیوار
- Neighborhood
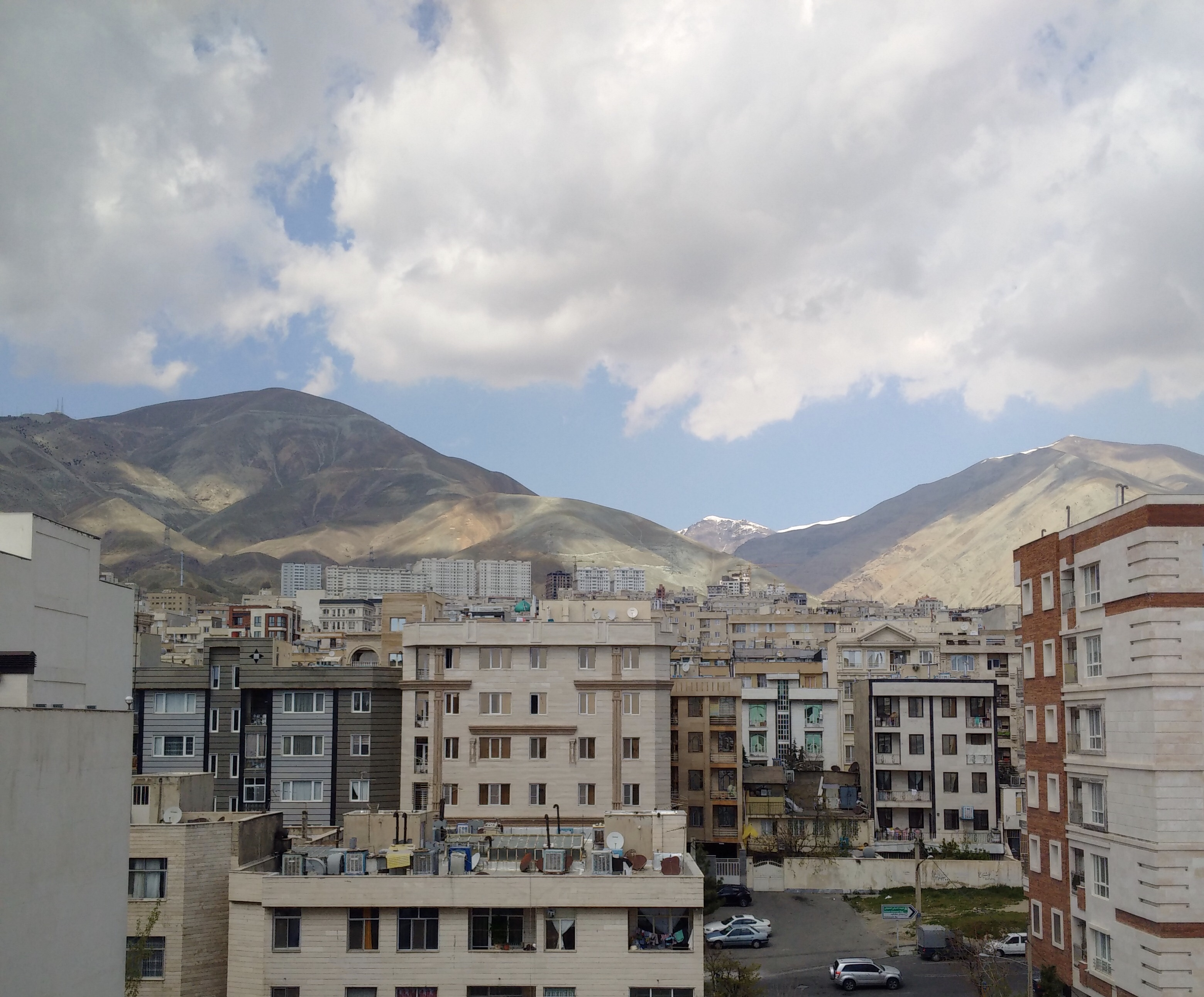
- Simon Bolivar, Tehran, Facing north towards Alborz mountains

- Location in Tehran and Iran Simon Bolivar (Iran)
- Coordinates: 35°46′31″N 51°19′51″E
- Country: Iran
- Province: Tehran
- City: Tehran
- District: District 5

Area
  - Total: 1.36 km^{2} (0.53 sq mi)
- Elevation: 1,550 m (5,090 ft)

Population
  - Total: 53,000
- Time zone: UTC+3:30 (IRST)
  - Summer (DST): UTC+4:30 (IRDT)
- Area code: (+98)0214482
- Website: https://region5.tehran.ir/

Simon Bolivar (Persian: سیمون بولیوار, Persian pronunciation: [siˈmom boˈliβaɾr]), also called Almahdi, is an affluent neighborhood in north western Tehran located on the hills of Alborz Mountains. Due to the latest census held in Tehran, the hood is home to 53000 people in a 1.36 square kilometers wide area. It's named after Simón Bolívar, the Venezuelan military and political leader.

== Location ==
The neighborhood borders limit from north to Simon Bolivar Boulevard (named after Simón Bolívar), from east to Ashrafi Esfahani Expressway, from south to Hashemi Rafsanjani Expressway and from west to Sattari Expressway. Within the administrative divisions of Tehran, Simon Bolivar has common borders along with six neighborhoods including: Morad Abad, Kouhsar and Naft (in the north), Punak (in the east), North Punak (in the south) and finally North Jannat Abad (in the west). Since Simon Bolivar is located on a relief ground in comparison to most of Tehran, it benefits from healthy non polluted air according to Tehran Air Quality Control Company. Using Hashemi Rafsanjani Expressway, Simon Bolivar connects to Sa'adat Abad (to east) and Jannat Abad (to west). Excluding western and southwestern parts, it’s almost a residential neighborhood with pacific atmosphere and snug vegetated alleys while main streets are quite wide. Streets and alleys follow a tidy rectangular pattern which makes it easy to reach anyplace.

== Transportations ==
Main streets in Simon Bolivar are listed below:

- Imam Reza St.
- Zeytoun St.
- Almahdi St.
- Chamran St.
- Fakouri St.

BRT (Tehran rapid bus transits):

- Taleqani station (line #10)

== Gallery ==
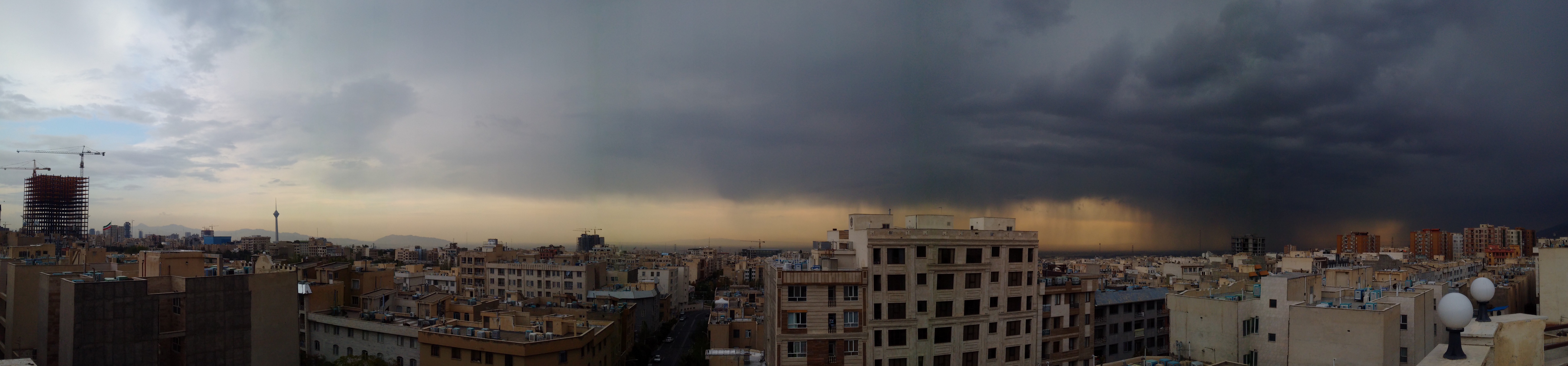
Panoramic view of fascinating rainfall in southwest Simon Bolivar (swipe left to see), Milad Tower is also visible in the southeast
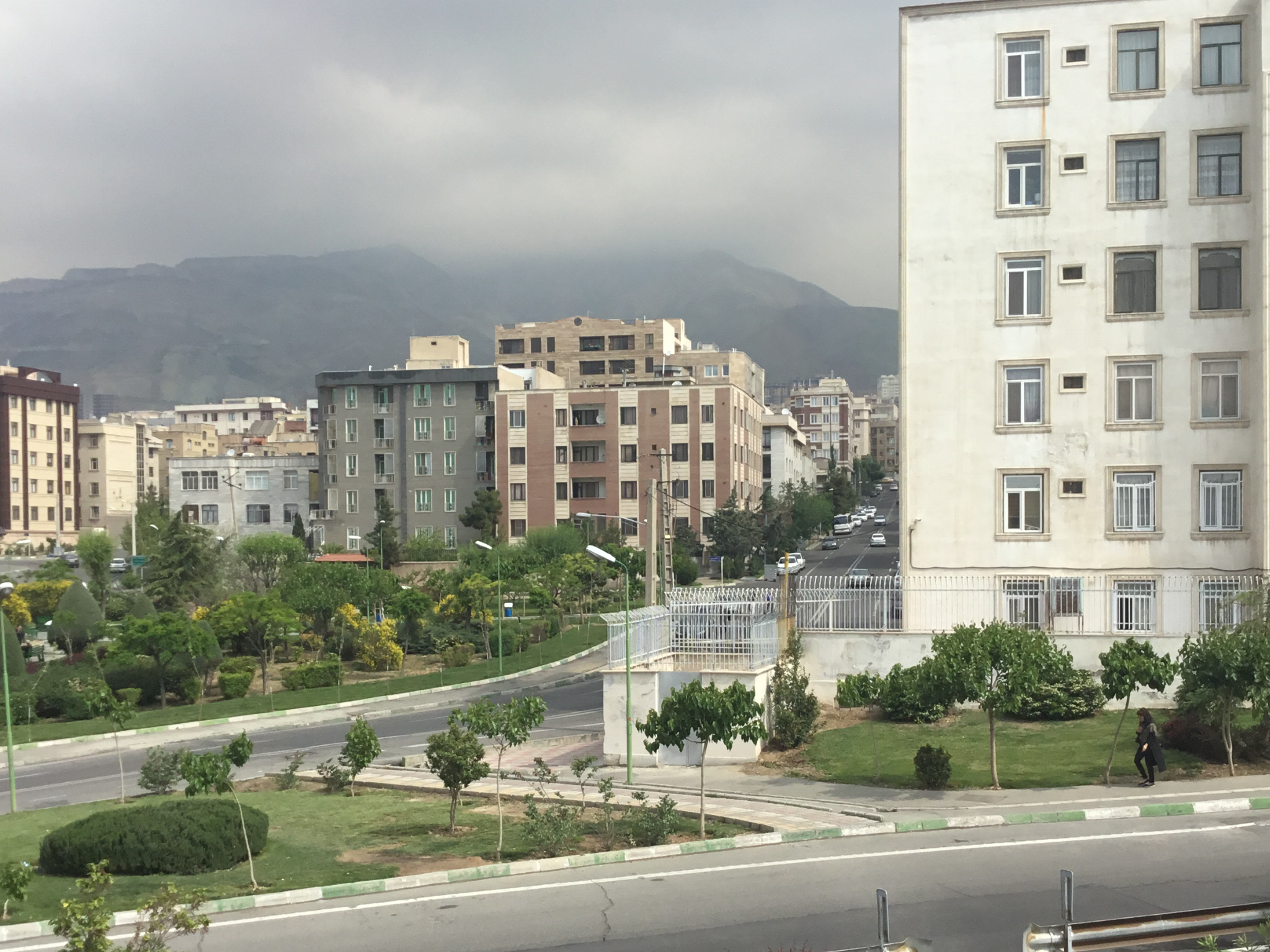
Simon Bolivar during Spring

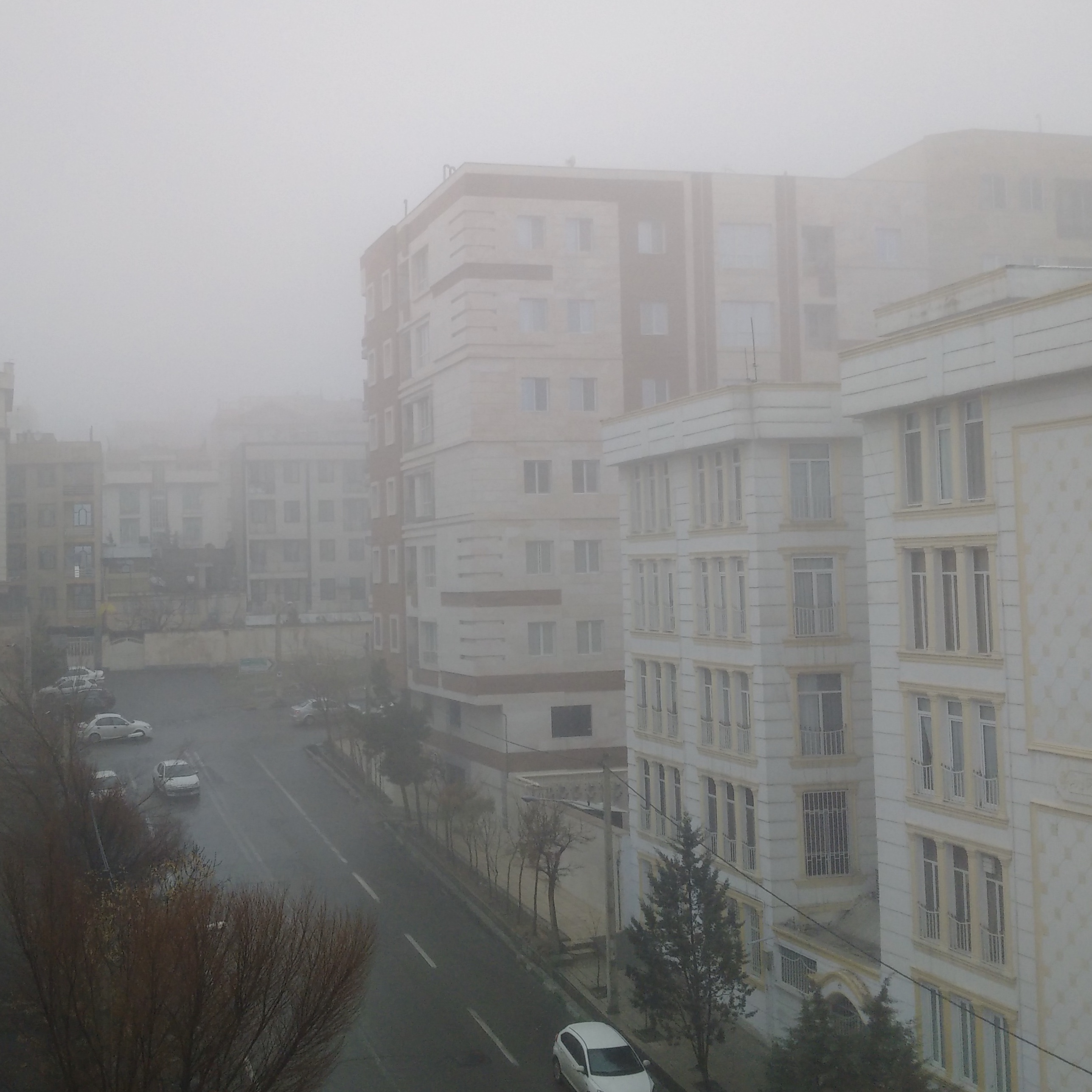
Autumnal haze in Simon Bolivar. Mountains vanished due to obscurity of vision (autumn to spring).

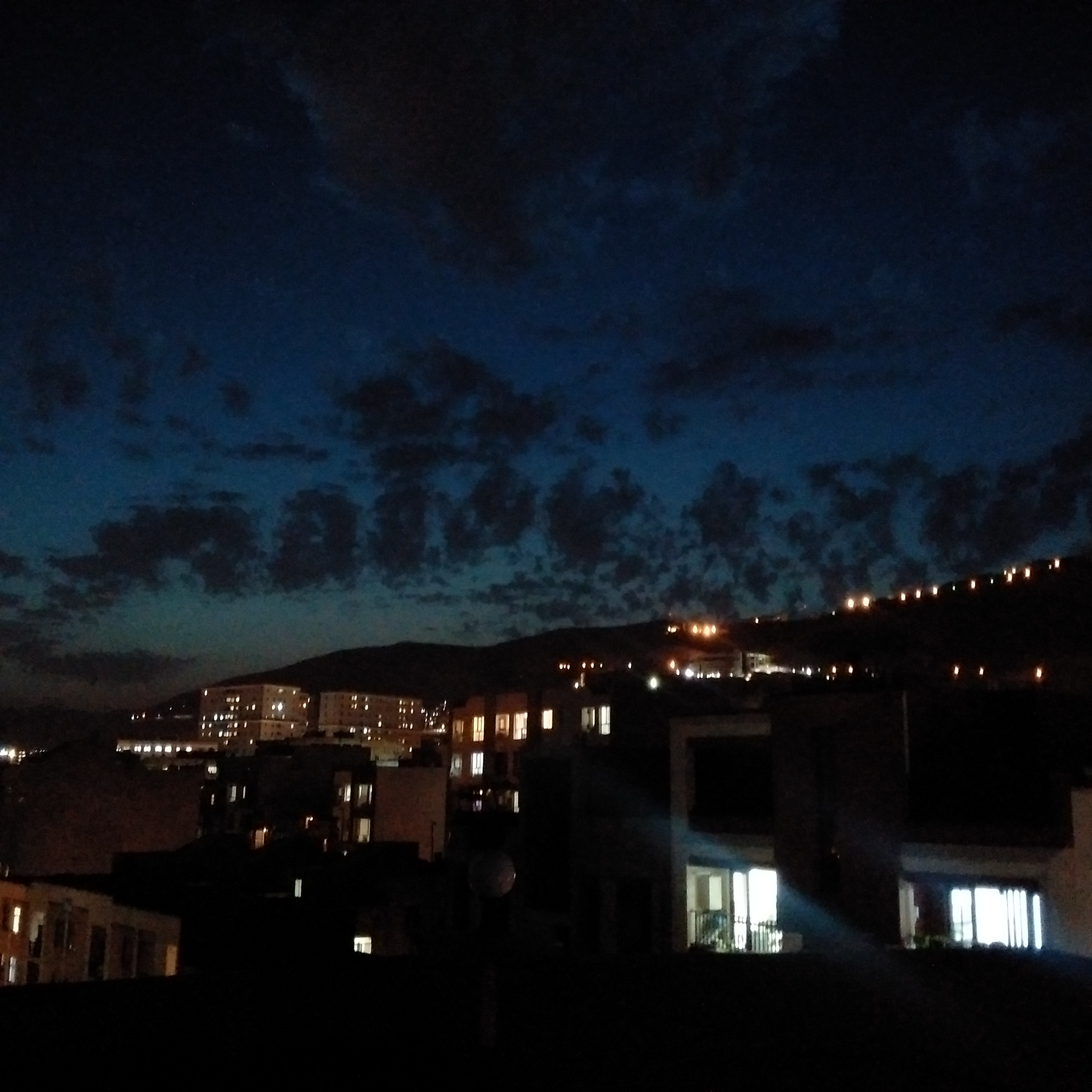
Nocturnal clouds over Simon Bolivar.

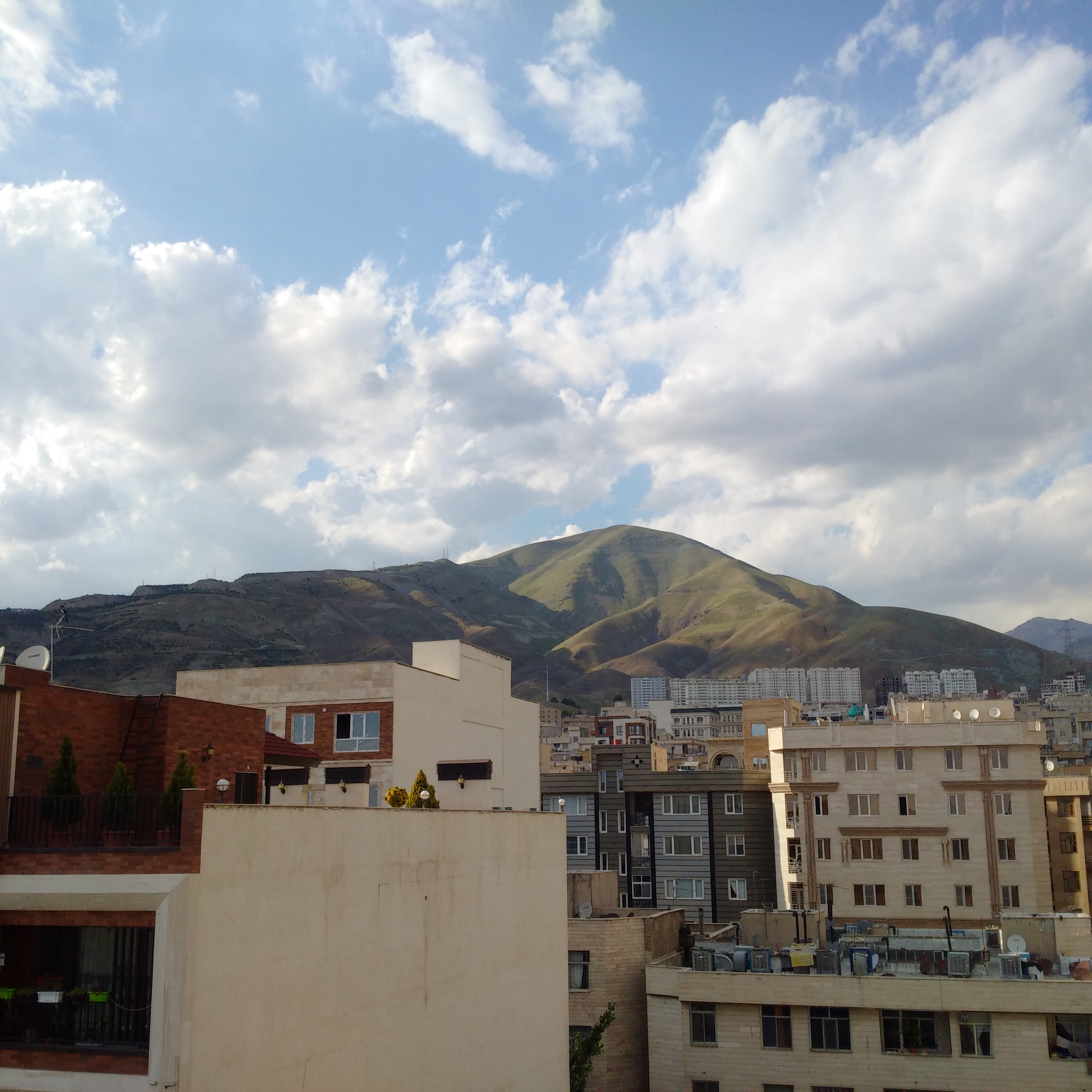
Prairie on the southern flank of Alborz mountain ranges, Simon Bolivar during springtime.

== See also ==
- Punak
- Tehran
- Sa'adat Abad
- List of expressways in Tehran
