= Farahzad =

Neighborhood in Tehran

Coordinates: 35.786°N 51.343°E

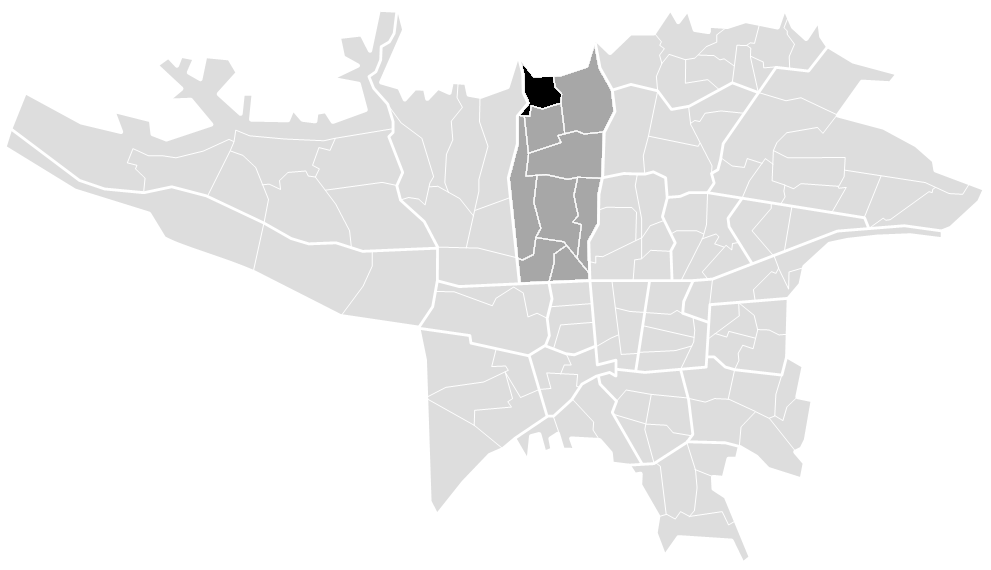
Location of Farahzad (black) in Municipal District No. 2 (dark grey) of Tehran metropolis

Farahzad (Persian: فرحزاد) is a neighborhood in North West Tehran, the capital city of Iran.
