= Shahr-e ziba =

Neighborhood in the western part of Tehran

Coordinates: 35.749022°N 51.29000°E

Shahr-e ziba (Persian: شهر زیبا) is a neighborhood in the western part of Tehran.

In 1964, some of the Assyrian Iranian community began moving to Shahr-e ziba; the first Assyrian girls school, Hazrat Maryam, was opened in 1969.
