= Punak =

Neighbourhood in Tehran

Punak پونک
- Neighborhood
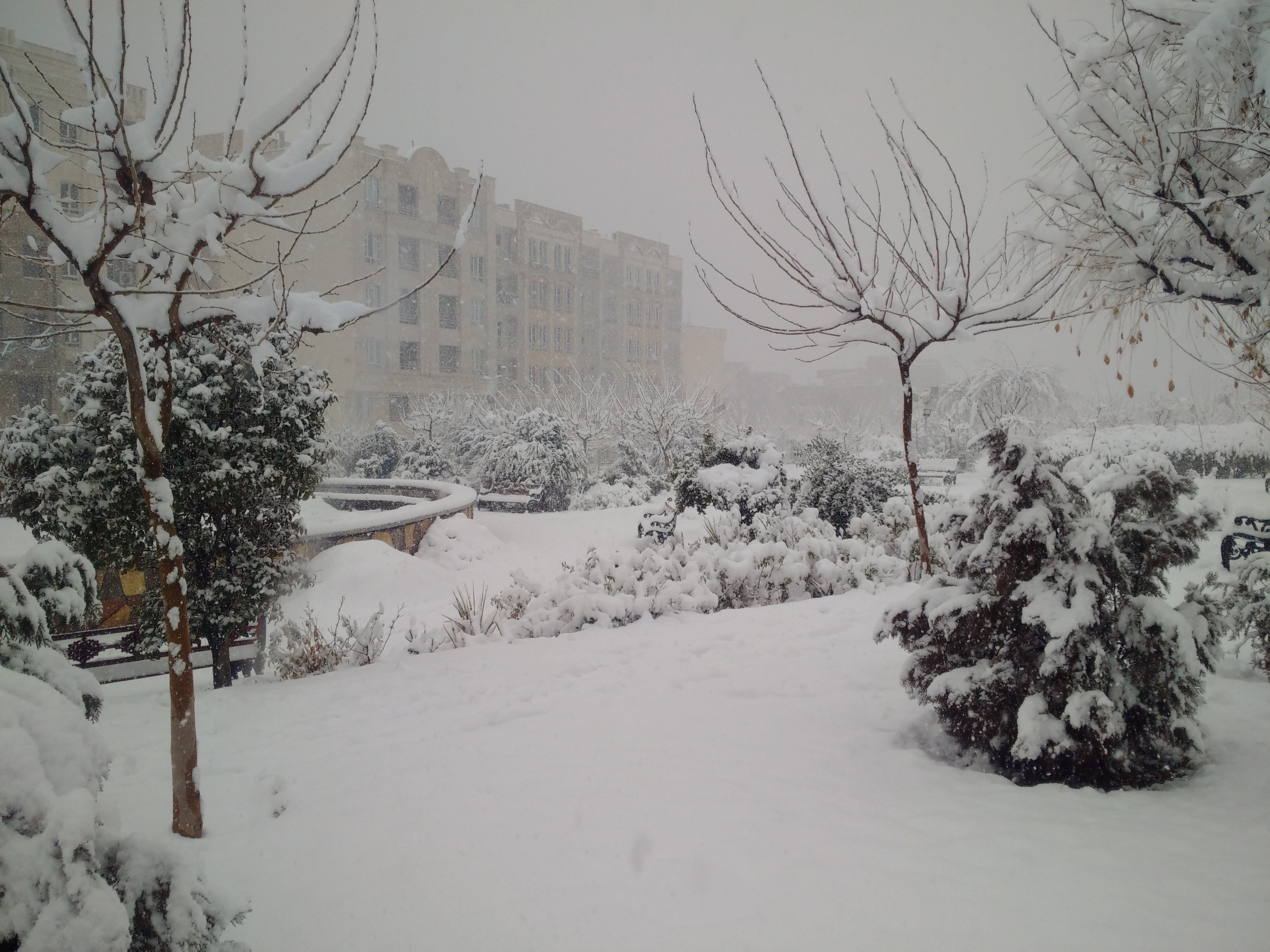
- Punak in 2020 winter

- Location in Tehran and Iran Punak (Iran)
- Coordinates: 35°45′48″N 51°20′12″E
- Country: Iran
- Province: Tehran
- City: Tehran
- District: Districts 5 and 2
- Elevation: 1,480 m (4,860 ft)

Population
  - Total: 29,000
- Time zone: UTC+3:30 (IRST)
  - Summer (DST): UTC+4:30 (IRDT)
- Area code: (+98)021444
- Website: https://region5.tehran.ir/

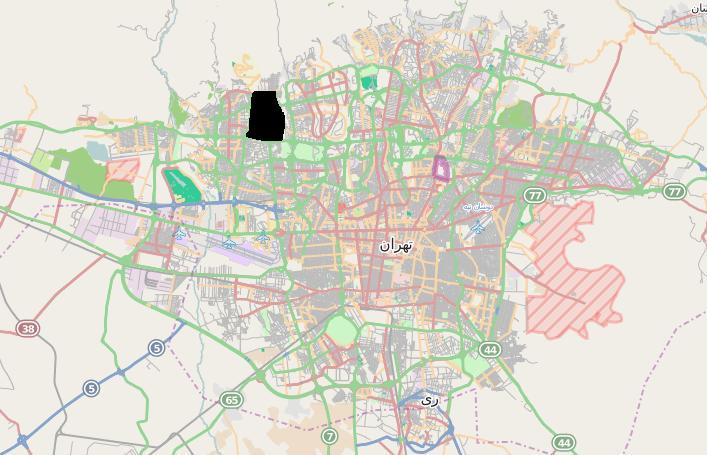
Punak within map of Tehran (colored in black)

Punak (Persian: پونک) is an affluent neighborhood located in the northwestern part of Tehran, Iran. It is situated across District 5 and District 2 of the Tehran Municipality. Known for its modern urban planning, high-rise residential buildings, and commercial centers, Punak is considered one of the most desirable and rapidly developing residential areas in the city.

== History ==
Originally, Punak was a small village on the outskirts of Tehran, known for its pleasant climate and agricultural lands. The name "Punak" is believed to be derived from the word "Pooneh" (Persian for wild mint), which grew abundantly in the area's gardens and along the Farahzad river. Rapid urbanization in the late 20th century transformed the village into a dense, modern residential district.

== Landmarks and Amenities ==
Punak is a major commercial hub in West Tehran. Key landmarks include:

- Boostan Shopping Center: One of the largest and oldest commercial complexes in the area, serving as a central point for retail and social activity.
- Nahj al-Balagha Park: A large recreational park located in the Farahzad valley, offering walking paths, sports facilities, and green spaces.
- Imamzadeh Eynali and Zeynali: A historical religious shrine and pilgrimage site located in the northern part of the neighborhood.
- Higher Education: The neighborhood is home to several educational institutions, including branches of the Islamic Azad University.

== Transportation ==
The neighborhood is well-connected to the rest of Tehran via several major highways, including the Ashrafi Esfahani Expressway, Hemmat Expressway, and Hashemi Rafsanjani Highway. While Punak does not have its own metro station, it is served by the Tehran Bus Rapid Transit (BRT) Line 10, which connects the neighborhood to Azadi Square and the northern districts.
