= Samsun Amisos Hill Gondola =

- Samsun Amisos Tepesi Teleferik Hattı
- Location within Turkey

Overview
- Status: Operational
- Character: Recreational
- Location: Samsun
- Country: Turkey
- Coordinates: 41°19′18″N 36°19′24″E
- Termini: Batıpark (north); Amisos Tepesi (south)
- Elevation: lowest: 0 m (0 ft) highest: 62 m (203 ft)
- No. of stations: 2
- Built by: STM Sistem Teleferik, Turkey
- Construction begin: 2005
- Open: 2006; 20 years ago

Operation
- Owner: Samsun Metropolitan Municipality
- Operator: Samulaş Inc.
- No. of carriers: 6 (in two groups of 3)
- Carrier capacity: 6
- Ridership: 360 hourly

Technical features
- Aerial lift type: Bi-cable gondola detachable
- Manufactured by: STM Sistem Teleferik, Turkey
- Line length: 320 m (1,050 ft)
- Cable diameter: 43 mm (1.7 in)
- Installed power: 110 kW
- Operating speed: max. 3 m/s (9.8 ft/s)

The Samsun Amisos Hill Gondola (Turkish: Samsun Amisos Tepesi Teleferik Hattı) is a two-station aerial lift line of gondola type in Samsun, Turkey, serving the nearby hilltop Amisos.

The 320 m (1,050 ft) long line was constructed in eight months by the Turkish company STM Sistem Teleferik from İzmir, which delivered also the technical equipment. The construction of the line completed in October 2005.

Spanning over Atatürk Boulevard towards south, the gondola lift line connects Batıpark (literally: West Park) on the Black Sea shore, a large urban park on land reclaimed from the sea, with Amisos Hill (Turkish: Amisos Tepesi), an archaeological site. At Amisos Hill, tumuli called Baruthane Tümülüsleri (Baruthane Tumuli), are found containing tombs dating back to an era between 300 BC and 30 BC. The hill features an archaeological museum and a café-restaurant.

The number of the six-seater gondolas increased from initially two to six, which run in two sets of three cabins in a row. The gondola line is owned by the Samsun Metropolitan Municipality, which operated it until September 2013. The municipality leased the lift line to its subsidiary company for transportation, the Samulaş Inc. for a five-year term.

== Features ==
- Length: 320 m (1,050 ft)
- Height difference: 62 m (203 ft)
- Speed: max. 3 m/s
- Ridership: 360 hourly
- Cabin capacity: 6
- Engine power: 110 kW
- Cable diameter: 43 mm
- Terminals:
  - Batıpark 41°19′18″N 36°19′24″E
  - Amisos Tepesi 41°19′08″N 36°19′20″E

== See also ==
- List of gondola lifts in Turkey
