= İncirli =

- Neighbourhood
- Location in Turkey İncirli (Turkey Central Anatolia)
- Coordinates: 39.984°N 32.846°E
- Country: Turkey
- Province: Ankara
- District: Keçiören
- Population (2022): 30,440
- Time zone: UTC+3 (TRT)

İncirli is a neighbourhood in the municipality and district of Keçiören, Ankara Province, Turkey. Its population is 30,440 (2022). The Yunus Emre Avenue is the main road in the neighbourhood. It is bordered by Etlik, Aşağı Eğlence, Esertepe and Kuşcağız neighbourhoods within the same district.

== Name ==
The meaning of the name İncirli in Turkish is "(land) with figs". The area was once famous for fig trees.
