= Keçiören =

- District and municipality
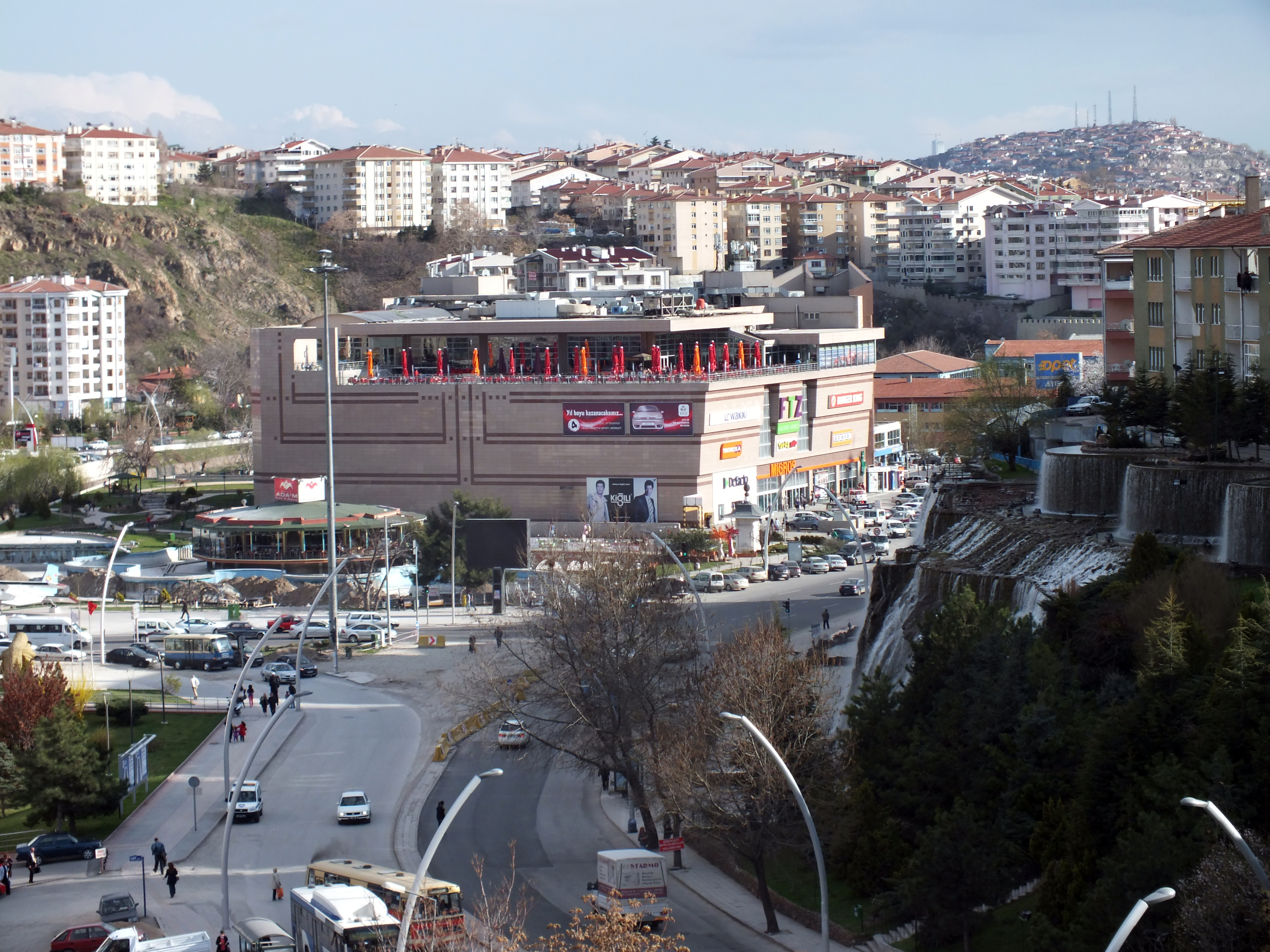
- A view of FTZ Shopping Mall in Keçiören

- Logo

- Map showing Keçiören District in Ankara Province

- Location within Turkey Location within Turkey Central Anatolia
- Coordinates: 40°00′N 32°52′E
- Country: Turkey
- Province: Ankara

Government
  - Mayor: Mesut Özarslan (AKP)
- Area: 159 km^{2} (61 sq mi)
- Elevation: 950 m (3,120 ft)
- Population (2022): 939,279
  - Density: 5,910/km^{2} (15,300/sq mi)
- Time zone: UTC+3 (TRT)
- Postal code: 06310
- Area code: 0312
- Website: www.kecioren.bel.tr

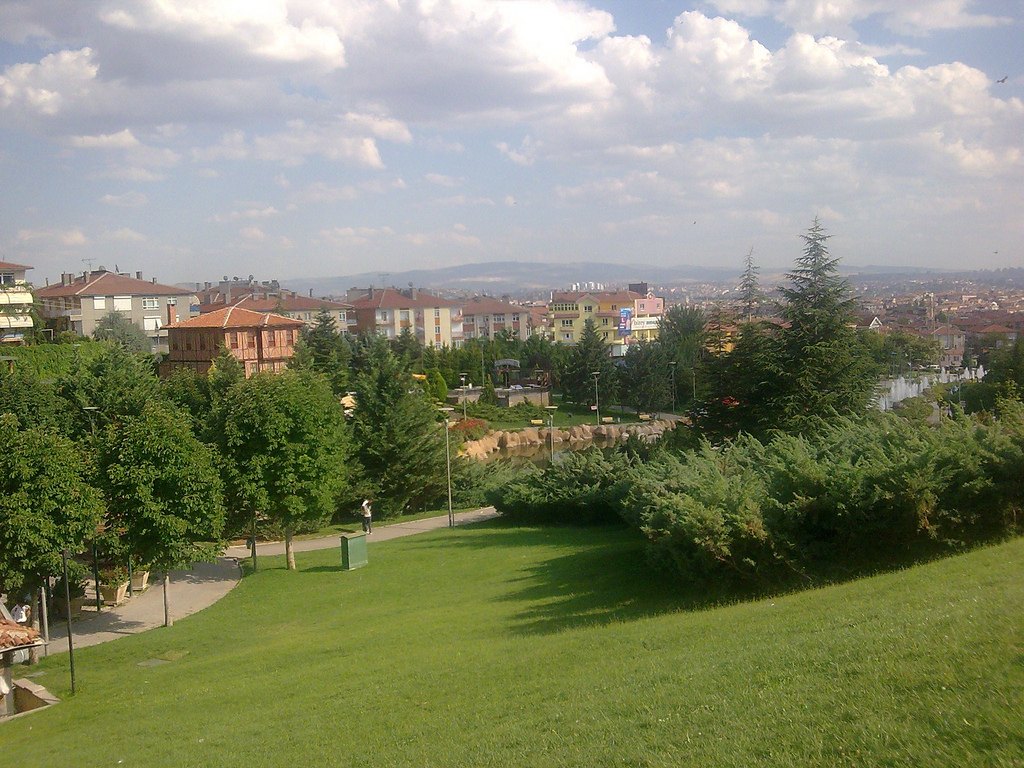
A view of the Gökçek Park

Keçiören is a municipality and metropolitan district of Ankara Province, Turkey. Its area is 159 km^{2}, and its population is 939,279 (2022). It is a crowded district in the northern part of the city of Ankara. Its elevation is 950 m (3,117 ft). The Çubuk River runs through the middle of the district.

== Composition ==
There are 51 neighbourhoods in Keçiören District:

- 19 Mayıs
- 23 Nisan
- Adnan Menderes
- Aktepe
- Aşağı Eğlence
- Atapark
- Ayvalı
- Bademlik
- Bağlarbaşı
- Bağlum Güzelyurt
- Basınevleri
- Çaldıran
- Çalseki
- Çiçekli
- Emrah
- Esertepe
- Etlik
- Güçlükaya
- Gümüşdere
- Güzelyurt
- Hasköy
- Hisar
- İncirli
- Kafkas
- Kalaba
- Kamil Ocak
- Kanuni
- Karakaya
- Karargahtepe
- Karşıyaka
- Kavacık Subayevleri
- Köşk
- Kösrelik
- Kuşcağız
- Osmangazi
- Ovacık
- Pınarbaşı
- Sancaktepe
- Sarıbeyler
- Şefkat
- Şehit Kubilay
- Şenlik
- Şenyuva
- Tepebaşı
- Ufuktepe
- Uyanış
- Yakacık
- Yayla
- Yeşilöz
- Yeşiltepe
- Yükseltepe

== Etymology ==
From Kiçivirân or Kiçiören (small ruins). The first part is unrelated to keçi (goat), but rather a dissimilation of older *kiçi ("small"), from Proto-Turkic *kičüg.

== Politics ==
Until the 1950s this was a green and pleasant area outside the city, but in recent years has become a large district of housing for Ankara's working class. The President of Turkey Recep Tayyip Erdoğan has his Ankara residence within the district. The incumbent mayor of Keçiören is Mesut Özarslan of the secular main opposition Republican People's Party.

In August 2018 the Municipality decided not to issue business licenses to American brands including McDonald's, Starbucks and Burger King as a response to the U.S. sanctions on Turkey.

In 2024 the municipal council unanimously decided to ban all the signs in foreign languages and require the usage of exclusively Turkish, with the exception of business branding.

== Sports ==
The sports club Keçiörengücü is based in Keçiören.

== Prominent neighbourhoods ==
- Etlik, on high ground overlooking the city
- İncirli

== Places of interest ==
Mustafa Kemal Atatürk's headquarters during the Turkish War of Independence, today used by the department of meteorology

The current administration has made efforts to decorate the mass of dull concrete that the area mainly consists of. The new buildings include a huge artificial waterfall and many other pools and fountains, and a concrete replica of the Hungarian Esztergom Castle.

The district has a high ranking science high school called Keçiören Patriot Martyr Major General Aydoğan Aydın Science High School. Its the eighth best overall high school in Ankara as of 2024 with its high LGS score.

Keçiören has a two-station aerial lift, the Keçiören Gondola, which connects the neighborhoods Tepebaşı (Cumhuriyet station) and Kavacık Subayevleri (Atatürk station). As of November 2013, it is the only in Ankara and Turkey's longest urban gondola lift line with its length of 1,653 m (5,423 ft).

== Keçiören children's games ==
To many Turkish people the name Keçiören evokes a popular children's TV outdoor game show (similar to the British It's a Knockout) of the 1980s, which was recorded in the district.

== Demographics ==
Historical population
Year / Pop. / ±% p.a.; 2007 / 843,535 / —	Year / Pop. / ±% p.a.; 2012 / 840,809 / −0.06%	Year / Pop. / ±% p.a.; 2017 / 917,759 / +1.77%	Year / Pop. / ±% p.a.; 2022 / 939,279 / +0.46%	Year / Pop. / ±% p.a.	Year / Pop. / ±% p.a.	Year / Pop. / ±% p.a.	Year / Pop. / ±% p.a.	Year / Pop. / ±% p.a.	Year / Pop. / ±% p.a.	Year / Pop. / ±% p.a.	Year / Pop. / ±% p.a.	Year / Pop. / ±% p.a.	Year / Pop. / ±% p.a.	Year / Pop. / ±% p.a.	Year / Pop. / ±% p.a.	Year / Pop. / ±% p.a.	Year / Pop. / ±% p.a.	Year / Pop. / ±% p.a.	Year / Pop. / ±% p.a.	Year / Pop. / ±% p.a.	Year / Pop. / ±% p.a.	Year / Pop. / ±% p.a.	Year / Pop. / ±% p.a.	Year / Pop. / ±% p.a.	Year / Pop. / ±% p.a.	Year / Pop. / ±% p.a.	Year / Pop. / ±% p.a.	Year / Pop. / ±% p.a.	Year / Pop. / ±% p.a.	Year / Pop. / ±% p.a.	Year / Pop. / ±% p.a.	Year / Pop. / ±% p.a.	Year / Pop. / ±% p.a.	Year / Pop. / ±% p.a.	Year / Pop. / ±% p.a.	Year / Pop. / ±% p.a.	Year / Pop. / ±% p.a.	Year / Pop. / ±% p.a.	Year / Pop. / ±% p.a.	Year / Pop. / ±% p.a.	Year / Pop. / ±% p.a.	Year / Pop. / ±% p.a.	Year / Pop. / ±% p.a.	Year / Pop. / ±% p.a.	Year / Pop. / ±% p.a.	Year / Pop. / ±% p.a.	Year / Pop. / ±% p.a.	Year / Pop. / ±% p.a.	Year / Pop. / ±% p.a.	Year / Pop. / ±% p.a.	Year / Pop. / ±% p.a.	Year / Pop. / ±% p.a.	Year / Pop. / ±% p.a.	Year / Pop. / ±% p.a.	Year / Pop. / ±% p.a.	Year / Pop. / ±% p.a.	Year / Pop. / ±% p.a.	Year / Pop. / ±% p.a.	Year / Pop. / ±% p.a.	Year / Pop. / ±% p.a.	Year / Pop. / ±% p.a.	Year / Pop. / ±% p.a.	Year / Pop. / ±% p.a.	Year / Pop. / ±% p.a.	Year / Pop. / ±% p.a.	Year / Pop. / ±% p.a.	Year / Pop. / ±% p.a.	Year / Pop. / ±% p.a.	Year / Pop. / ±% p.a.	Year / Pop. / ±% p.a.	Year / Pop. / ±% p.a.	Year / Pop. / ±% p.a.	Year / Pop. / ±% p.a.	Year / Pop. / ±% p.a.	Year / Pop. / ±% p.a.	Year / Pop. / ±% p.a.	Year / Pop. / ±% p.a.	Year / Pop. / ±% p.a.	Year / Pop. / ±% p.a.	Year / Pop. / ±% p.a.	Year / Pop. / ±% p.a.	Year / Pop. / ±% p.a.	Year / Pop. / ±% p.a.	Year / Pop. / ±% p.a.	Year / Pop. / ±% p.a.	Year / Pop. / ±% p.a.	Year / Pop. / ±% p.a.	Year / Pop. / ±% p.a.	Year / Pop. / ±% p.a.	Year / Pop. / ±% p.a.	Year / Pop. / ±% p.a.	Year / Pop. / ±% p.a.	Year / Pop. / ±% p.a.	Year / Pop. / ±% p.a.	Year / Pop. / ±% p.a.	Year / Pop. / ±% p.a.	Year / Pop. / ±% p.a.	Year / Pop. / ±% p.a.	Year / Pop. / ±% p.a.	Year / Pop. / ±% p.a.	Year / Pop. / ±% p.a.	Year / Pop. / ±% p.a.	Year / Pop. / ±% p.a.	Year / Pop. / ±% p.a.	Year / Pop. / ±% p.a.	Year / Pop. / ±% p.a.	Year / Pop. / ±% p.a.	Year / Pop. / ±% p.a.	Year / Pop. / ±% p.a.	Year / Pop. / ±% p.a.	Year / Pop. / ±% p.a.	Year / Pop. / ±% p.a.	Year / Pop. / ±% p.a.	Year / Pop. / ±% p.a.	Year / Pop. / ±% p.a.	Year / Pop. / ±% p.a.	Year / Pop. / ±% p.a.	Year / Pop. / ±% p.a.	Year / Pop. / ±% p.a.	Year / Pop. / ±% p.a.	Year / Pop. / ±% p.a.	Year / Pop. / ±% p.a.	Year / Pop. / ±% p.a.	Year / Pop. / ±% p.a.	Year / Pop. / ±% p.a.	Year / Pop. / ±% p.a.	Year / Pop. / ±% p.a.	Year / Pop. / ±% p.a.	Year / Pop. / ±% p.a.	Year / Pop. / ±% p.a.	Year / Pop. / ±% p.a.	Year / Pop. / ±% p.a.	Year / Pop. / ±% p.a.	Year / Pop. / ±% p.a.	Year / Pop. / ±% p.a.	Year / Pop. / ±% p.a.	Year / Pop. / ±% p.a.	Year / Pop. / ±% p.a.	Year / Pop. / ±% p.a.	Year / Pop. / ±% p.a.	Year / Pop. / ±% p.a.	Year / Pop. / ±% p.a.	Year / Pop. / ±% p.a.	Year / Pop. / ±% p.a.	Year / Pop. / ±% p.a.	Year / Pop. / ±% p.a.	Year / Pop. / ±% p.a.	Year / Pop. / ±% p.a.	Year / Pop. / ±% p.a.	Year / Pop. / ±% p.a.	Year / Pop. / ±% p.a.	Year / Pop. / ±% p.a.	Year / Pop. / ±% p.a.	Year / Pop. / ±% p.a.	Year / Pop. / ±% p.a.	Year / Pop. / ±% p.a.	Year / Pop. / ±% p.a.	Year / Pop. / ±% p.a.	Year / Pop. / ±% p.a.	Year / Pop. / ±% p.a.	Year / Pop. / ±% p.a.	Year / Pop. / ±% p.a.	Year / Pop. / ±% p.a.	Year / Pop. / ±% p.a.	Year / Pop. / ±% p.a.	Year / Pop. / ±% p.a.	Year / Pop. / ±% p.a.	Year / Pop. / ±% p.a.	Year / Pop. / ±% p.a.	Year / Pop. / ±% p.a.	Year / Pop. / ±% p.a.	Year / Pop. / ±% p.a.	Year / Pop. / ±% p.a.	Year / Pop. / ±% p.a.	Year / Pop. / ±% p.a.	Year / Pop. / ±% p.a.	Year / Pop. / ±% p.a.	Year / Pop. / ±% p.a.	Year / Pop. / ±% p.a.	Year / Pop. / ±% p.a.	Year / Pop. / ±% p.a.	Year / Pop. / ±% p.a.	Year / Pop. / ±% p.a.	Year / Pop. / ±% p.a.	Year / Pop. / ±% p.a.	Year / Pop. / ±% p.a.	Year / Pop. / ±% p.a.	Year / Pop. / ±% p.a.	Year / Pop. / ±% p.a.	Year / Pop. / ±% p.a.	Year / Pop. / ±% p.a.	Year / Pop. / ±% p.a.	Year / Pop. / ±% p.a.	Year / Pop. / ±% p.a.	Year / Pop. / ±% p.a.	Year / Pop. / ±% p.a.	Year / Pop. / ±% p.a.	Year / Pop. / ±% p.a.	Year / Pop. / ±% p.a.	Year / Pop. / ±% p.a.	Year / Pop. / ±% p.a.	Year / Pop. / ±% p.a.	Year / Pop. / ±% p.a.	Year / Pop. / ±% p.a.	Year / Pop. / ±% p.a.	Year / Pop. / ±% p.a.	Year / Pop. / ±% p.a.	Year / Pop. / ±% p.a.	Year / Pop. / ±% p.a.	Year / Pop. / ±% p.a.	Year / Pop. / ±% p.a.	Year / Pop. / ±% p.a.	Year / Pop. / ±% p.a.	Year / Pop. / ±% p.a.	Year / Pop. / ±% p.a.	Year / Pop. / ±% p.a.	Year / Pop. / ±% p.a.	Year / Pop. / ±% p.a.	Year / Pop. / ±% p.a.	Year / Pop. / ±% p.a.	Year / Pop. / ±% p.a.	Year / Pop. / ±% p.a.	Year / Pop. / ±% p.a.	Year / Pop. / ±% p.a.	Year / Pop. / ±% p.a.	Year / Pop. / ±% p.a.	Year / Pop. / ±% p.a.	Year / Pop. / ±% p.a.	Year / Pop. / ±% p.a.	Year / Pop. / ±% p.a.	Year / Pop. / ±% p.a.	Year / Pop. / ±% p.a.	Year / Pop. / ±% p.a.	Year / Pop. / ±% p.a.	Year / Pop. / ±% p.a.	Year / Pop. / ±% p.a.	Year / Pop. / ±% p.a.	Year / Pop. / ±% p.a.	Year / Pop. / ±% p.a.	Year / Pop. / ±% p.a.	Year / Pop. / ±% p.a.	Year / Pop. / ±% p.a.	Year / Pop. / ±% p.a.	Year / Pop. / ±% p.a.	Year / Pop. / ±% p.a.	Year / Pop. / ±% p.a.	Year / Pop. / ±% p.a.	Year / Pop. / ±% p.a.	Year / Pop. / ±% p.a.	Year / Pop. / ±% p.a.	Year / Pop. / ±% p.a.	Year / Pop. / ±% p.a.	Year / Pop. / ±% p.a.	Year / Pop. / ±% p.a.	Year / Pop. / ±% p.a.	Year / Pop. / ±% p.a.	Year / Pop. / ±% p.a.	Year / Pop. / ±% p.a.	Year / Pop. / ±% p.a.	Year / Pop. / ±% p.a.	Year / Pop. / ±% p.a.	Year / Pop. / ±% p.a.	Year / Pop. / ±% p.a.	Year / Pop. / ±% p.a.	Year / Pop. / ±% p.a.	Year / Pop. / ±% p.a.	Year / Pop. / ±% p.a.	Year / Pop. / ±% p.a.	Year / Pop. / ±% p.a.	Year / Pop. / ±% p.a.	Year / Pop. / ±% p.a.	Year / Pop. / ±% p.a.	Year / Pop. / ±% p.a.	Year / Pop. / ±% p.a.	Year / Pop. / ±% p.a.	Year / Pop. / ±% p.a.	Year / Pop. / ±% p.a.	Year / Pop. / ±% p.a.	Year / Pop. / ±% p.a.	Year / Pop. / ±% p.a.	Year / Pop. / ±% p.a.	Year / Pop. / ±% p.a.	Year / Pop. / ±% p.a.	Year / Pop. / ±% p.a.	Year / Pop. / ±% p.a.	Year / Pop. / ±% p.a.	Year / Pop. / ±% p.a.	Year / Pop. / ±% p.a.	Year / Pop. / ±% p.a.	Year / Pop. / ±% p.a.	Year / Pop. / ±% p.a.	Year / Pop. / ±% p.a.	Year / Pop. / ±% p.a.	Year / Pop. / ±% p.a.	Year / Pop. / ±% p.a.	Year / Pop. / ±% p.a.	Year / Pop. / ±% p.a.	Year / Pop. / ±% p.a.	Year / Pop. / ±% p.a.	Year / Pop. / ±% p.a.	Year / Pop. / ±% p.a.	Year / Pop. / ±% p.a.	Year / Pop. / ±% p.a.	Year / Pop. / ±% p.a.	Year / Pop. / ±% p.a.	Year / Pop. / ±% p.a.	Year / Pop. / ±% p.a.	Year / Pop. / ±% p.a.	Year / Pop. / ±% p.a.	Year / Pop. / ±% p.a.	Year / Pop. / ±% p.a.	Year / Pop. / ±% p.a.	Year / Pop. / ±% p.a.	Year / Pop. / ±% p.a.	Year / Pop. / ±% p.a.	Year / Pop. / ±% p.a.	Year / Pop. / ±% p.a.	Year / Pop. / ±% p.a.	Year / Pop. / ±% p.a.	Year / Pop. / ±% p.a.	Year / Pop. / ±% p.a.	Year / Pop. / ±% p.a.	Year / Pop. / ±% p.a.	Year / Pop. / ±% p.a.	Year / Pop. / ±% p.a.	Year / Pop. / ±% p.a.	Year / Pop. / ±% p.a.	Year / Pop. / ±% p.a.	Year / Pop. / ±% p.a.	Year / Pop. / ±% p.a.	Year / Pop. / ±% p.a.	Year / Pop. / ±% p.a.	Year / Pop. / ±% p.a.	Year / Pop. / ±% p.a.	Year / Pop. / ±% p.a.	Year / Pop. / ±% p.a.	Year / Pop. / ±% p.a.	Year / Pop. / ±% p.a.	Year / Pop. / ±% p.a.	Year / Pop. / ±% p.a.	Year / Pop. / ±% p.a.	Year / Pop. / ±% p.a.	Year / Pop. / ±% p.a.	Year / Pop. / ±% p.a.	Year / Pop. / ±% p.a.	Year / Pop. / ±% p.a.	Year / Pop. / ±% p.a.	Year / Pop. / ±% p.a.	Year / Pop. / ±% p.a.	Year / Pop. / ±% p.a.	Year / Pop. / ±% p.a.	Year / Pop. / ±% p.a.	Year / Pop. / ±% p.a.	Year / Pop. / ±% p.a.	Year / Pop. / ±% p.a.	Year / Pop. / ±% p.a.	Year / Pop. / ±% p.a.	Year / Pop. / ±% p.a.	Year / Pop. / ±% p.a.	Year / Pop. / ±% p.a.	Year / Pop. / ±% p.a.	Year / Pop. / ±% p.a.	Year / Pop. / ±% p.a.	Year / Pop. / ±% p.a.	Year / Pop. / ±% p.a.	Year / Pop. / ±% p.a.	Year / Pop. / ±% p.a.	Year / Pop. / ±% p.a.	Year / Pop. / ±% p.a.	Year / Pop. / ±% p.a.	Year / Pop. / ±% p.a.	Year / Pop. / ±% p.a.	Year / Pop. / ±% p.a.	Year / Pop. / ±% p.a.	Year / Pop. / ±% p.a.	Year / Pop. / ±% p.a.	Year / Pop. / ±% p.a.	Year / Pop. / ±% p.a.	Year / Pop. / ±% p.a.	Year / Pop. / ±% p.a.	Year / Pop. / ±% p.a.	Year / Pop. / ±% p.a.	Year / Pop. / ±% p.a.	Year / Pop. / ±% p.a.	Year / Pop. / ±% p.a.	Year / Pop. / ±% p.a.	Year / Pop. / ±% p.a.	Year / Pop. / ±% p.a.	Year / Pop. / ±% p.a.	Year / Pop. / ±% p.a.	Year / Pop. / ±% p.a.	Year / Pop. / ±% p.a.	Year / Pop. / ±% p.a.	Year / Pop. / ±% p.a.	Year / Pop. / ±% p.a.	Year / Pop. / ±% p.a.	Year / Pop. / ±% p.a.	Year / Pop. / ±% p.a.	Year / Pop. / ±% p.a.	Year / Pop. / ±% p.a.	Year / Pop. / ±% p.a.	Year / Pop. / ±% p.a.	Year / Pop. / ±% p.a.	Year / Pop. / ±% p.a.	Year / Pop. / ±% p.a.	Year / Pop. / ±% p.a.	Year / Pop. / ±% p.a.	Year / Pop. / ±% p.a.	Year / Pop. / ±% p.a.	Year / Pop. / ±% p.a.	Year / Pop. / ±% p.a.	Year / Pop. / ±% p.a.	Year / Pop. / ±% p.a.	Year / Pop. / ±% p.a.	Year / Pop. / ±% p.a.	Year / Pop. / ±% p.a.	Year / Pop. / ±% p.a.	Year / Pop. / ±% p.a.	Year / Pop. / ±% p.a.	Year / Pop. / ±% p.a.	Year / Pop. / ±% p.a.	Year / Pop. / ±% p.a.	Year / Pop. / ±% p.a.	Year / Pop. / ±% p.a.	Year / Pop. / ±% p.a.	Year / Pop. / ±% p.a.	Year / Pop. / ±% p.a.	Year / Pop. / ±% p.a.	Year / Pop. / ±% p.a.	Year / Pop. / ±% p.a.	Year / Pop. / ±% p.a.	Year / Pop. / ±% p.a.	Year / Pop. / ±% p.a.	Year / Pop. / ±% p.a.	Year / Pop. / ±% p.a.	Year / Pop. / ±% p.a.	Year / Pop. / ±% p.a.	Year / Pop. / ±% p.a.	Year / Pop. / ±% p.a.	Year / Pop. / ±% p.a.	Year / Pop. / ±% p.a.	Year / Pop. / ±% p.a.	Year / Pop. / ±% p.a.	Year / Pop. / ±% p.a.	Year / Pop. / ±% p.a.	Year / Pop. / ±% p.a.	Year / Pop. / ±% p.a.	Year / Pop. / ±% p.a.	Year / Pop. / ±% p.a.	Year / Pop. / ±% p.a.	Year / Pop. / ±% p.a.	Year / Pop. / ±% p.a.	Year / Pop. / ±% p.a.	Year / Pop. / ±% p.a.	Year / Pop. / ±% p.a.	Year / Pop. / ±% p.a.	Year / Pop. / ±% p.a.	Year / Pop. / ±% p.a.	Year / Pop. / ±% p.a.	Year / Pop. / ±% p.a.	Year / Pop. / ±% p.a.	Year / Pop. / ±% p.a.	Year / Pop. / ±% p.a.	Year / Pop. / ±% p.a.	Year / Pop. / ±% p.a.	Year / Pop. / ±% p.a.	Year / Pop. / ±% p.a.	Year / Pop. / ±% p.a.	Year / Pop. / ±% p.a.	Year / Pop. / ±% p.a.	Year / Pop. / ±% p.a.	Year / Pop. / ±% p.a.	Year / Pop. / ±% p.a.	Year / Pop. / ±% p.a.	Year / Pop. / ±% p.a.	Year / Pop. / ±% p.a.	Year / Pop. / ±% p.a.	Year / Pop. / ±% p.a.	Year / Pop. / ±% p.a.	Year / Pop. / ±% p.a.	Year / Pop. / ±% p.a.	Year / Pop. / ±% p.a.	Year / Pop. / ±% p.a.	Year / Pop. / ±% p.a.	Year / Pop. / ±% p.a.	Year / Pop. / ±% p.a.	Year / Pop. / ±% p.a.	Year / Pop. / ±% p.a.	Year / Pop. / ±% p.a.	Year / Pop. / ±% p.a.	Year / Pop. / ±% p.a.	Year / Pop. / ±% p.a.	Year / Pop. / ±% p.a.	Year / Pop. / ±% p.a.	Year / Pop. / ±% p.a.	Year / Pop. / ±% p.a.	Year / Pop. / ±% p.a.	Year / Pop. / ±% p.a.	Year / Pop. / ±% p.a.	Year / Pop. / ±% p.a.	Year / Pop. / ±% p.a.	Year / Pop. / ±% p.a.	Year / Pop. / ±% p.a.	Year / Pop. / ±% p.a.	Year / Pop. / ±% p.a.	Year / Pop. / ±% p.a.	Year / Pop. / ±% p.a.	Year / Pop. / ±% p.a.	Year / Pop. / ±% p.a.	Year / Pop. / ±% p.a.	Year / Pop. / ±% p.a.	Year / Pop. / ±% p.a.	Year / Pop. / ±% p.a.	Year / Pop. / ±% p.a.	Year / Pop. / ±% p.a.	Year / Pop. / ±% p.a.	Year / Pop. / ±% p.a.	Year / Pop. / ±% p.a.	Year / Pop. / ±% p.a.	Year / Pop. / ±% p.a.	Year / Pop. / ±% p.a.	Year / Pop. / ±% p.a.	Year / Pop. / ±% p.a.	Year / Pop. / ±% p.a.	Year / Pop. / ±% p.a.	Year / Pop. / ±% p.a.	Year / Pop. / ±% p.a.	Year / Pop. / ±% p.a.	Year / Pop. / ±% p.a.	Year / Pop. / ±% p.a.	Year / Pop. / ±% p.a.	Year / Pop. / ±% p.a.	Year / Pop. / ±% p.a.	Year / Pop. / ±% p.a.	Year / Pop. / ±% p.a.	Year / Pop. / ±% p.a.	Year / Pop. / ±% p.a.	Year / Pop. / ±% p.a.	Year / Pop. / ±% p.a.	Year / Pop. / ±% p.a.	Year / Pop. / ±% p.a.	Year / Pop. / ±% p.a.	Year / Pop. / ±% p.a.	Year / Pop. / ±% p.a.	Year / Pop. / ±% p.a.	Year / Pop. / ±% p.a.	Year / Pop. / ±% p.a.	Year / Pop. / ±% p.a.	Year / Pop. / ±% p.a.	Year / Pop. / ±% p.a.	Year / Pop. / ±% p.a.	Year / Pop. / ±% p.a.	Year / Pop. / ±% p.a.	Year / Pop. / ±% p.a.	Year / Pop. / ±% p.a.	Year / Pop. / ±% p.a.	Year / Pop. / ±% p.a.	Year / Pop. / ±% p.a.	Year / Pop. / ±% p.a.	Year / Pop. / ±% p.a.	Year / Pop. / ±% p.a.	Year / Pop. / ±% p.a.	Year / Pop. / ±% p.a.	Year / Pop. / ±% p.a.	Year / Pop. / ±% p.a.	Year / Pop. / ±% p.a.	Year / Pop. / ±% p.a.	Year / Pop. / ±% p.a.	Year / Pop. / ±% p.a.	Year / Pop. / ±% p.a.	Year / Pop. / ±% p.a.	Year / Pop. / ±% p.a.	Year / Pop. / ±% p.a.	Year / Pop. / ±% p.a.	Year / Pop. / ±% p.a.	Year / Pop. / ±% p.a.	Year / Pop. / ±% p.a.	Year / Pop. / ±% p.a.	Year / Pop. / ±% p.a.	Year / Pop. / ±% p.a.	Year / Pop. / ±% p.a.	Year / Pop. / ±% p.a.	Year / Pop. / ±% p.a.	Year / Pop. / ±% p.a.	Year / Pop. / ±% p.a.	Year / Pop. / ±% p.a.	Year / Pop. / ±% p.a.	Year / Pop. / ±% p.a.	Year / Pop. / ±% p.a.	Year / Pop. / ±% p.a.	Year / Pop. / ±% p.a.	Year / Pop. / ±% p.a.	Year / Pop. / ±% p.a.	Year / Pop. / ±% p.a.	Year / Pop. / ±% p.a.	Year / Pop. / ±% p.a.	Year / Pop. / ±% p.a.	Year / Pop. / ±% p.a.	Year / Pop. / ±% p.a.	Year / Pop. / ±% p.a.	Year / Pop. / ±% p.a.	Year / Pop. / ±% p.a.	Year / Pop. / ±% p.a.	Year / Pop. / ±% p.a.	Year / Pop. / ±% p.a.	Year / Pop. / ±% p.a.	Year / Pop. / ±% p.a.	Year / Pop. / ±% p.a.	Year / Pop. / ±% p.a.	Year / Pop. / ±% p.a.	Year / Pop. / ±% p.a.	Year / Pop. / ±% p.a.	Year / Pop. / ±% p.a.	Year / Pop. / ±% p.a.	Year / Pop. / ±% p.a.	Year / Pop. / ±% p.a.	Year / Pop. / ±% p.a.	Year / Pop. / ±% p.a.	Year / Pop. / ±% p.a.	Year / Pop. / ±% p.a.	Year / Pop. / ±% p.a.	Year / Pop. / ±% p.a.	Year / Pop. / ±% p.a.	Year / Pop. / ±% p.a.	Year / Pop. / ±% p.a.	Year / Pop. / ±% p.a.	Year / Pop. / ±% p.a.	Year / Pop. / ±% p.a.	Year / Pop. / ±% p.a.	Year / Pop. / ±% p.a.	Year / Pop. / ±% p.a.	Year / Pop. / ±% p.a.	Year / Pop. / ±% p.a.	Year / Pop. / ±% p.a.	Year / Pop. / ±% p.a.	Year / Pop. / ±% p.a.	Year / Pop. / ±% p.a.	Year / Pop. / ±% p.a.	Year / Pop. / ±% p.a.	Year / Pop. / ±% p.a.	Year / Pop. / ±% p.a.	Year / Pop. / ±% p.a.	Year / Pop. / ±% p.a.	Year / Pop. / ±% p.a.	Year / Pop. / ±% p.a.	Year / Pop. / ±% p.a.	Year / Pop. / ±% p.a.	Year / Pop. / ±% p.a.	Year / Pop. / ±% p.a.	Year / Pop. / ±% p.a.	Year / Pop. / ±% p.a.	Year / Pop. / ±% p.a.	Year / Pop. / ±% p.a.	Year / Pop. / ±% p.a.	Year / Pop. / ±% p.a.	Year / Pop. / ±% p.a.	Year / Pop. / ±% p.a.	Year / Pop. / ±% p.a.	Year / Pop. / ±% p.a.	Year / Pop. / ±% p.a.	Year / Pop. / ±% p.a.	Year / Pop. / ±% p.a.	Year / Pop. / ±% p.a.	Year / Pop. / ±% p.a.	Year / Pop. / ±% p.a.	Year / Pop. / ±% p.a.	Year / Pop. / ±% p.a.	Year / Pop. / ±% p.a.	Year / Pop. / ±% p.a.	Year / Pop. / ±% p.a.	Year / Pop. / ±% p.a.	Year / Pop. / ±% p.a.	Year / Pop. / ±% p.a.	Year / Pop. / ±% p.a.	Year / Pop. / ±% p.a.	Year / Pop. / ±% p.a.	Year / Pop. / ±% p.a.	Year / Pop. / ±% p.a.	Year / Pop. / ±% p.a.	Year / Pop. / ±% p.a.	Year / Pop. / ±% p.a.	Year / Pop. / ±% p.a.	Year / Pop. / ±% p.a.	Year / Pop. / ±% p.a.	Year / Pop. / ±% p.a.	Year / Pop. / ±% p.a.	Year / Pop. / ±% p.a.	Year / Pop. / ±% p.a.	Year / Pop. / ±% p.a.	Year / Pop. / ±% p.a.	Year / Pop. / ±% p.a.	Year / Pop. / ±% p.a.	Year / Pop. / ±% p.a.	Year / Pop. / ±% p.a.	Year / Pop. / ±% p.a.	Year / Pop. / ±% p.a.	Year / Pop. / ±% p.a.	Year / Pop. / ±% p.a.	Year / Pop. / ±% p.a.	Year / Pop. / ±% p.a.	Year / Pop. / ±% p.a.	Year / Pop. / ±% p.a.	Year / Pop. / ±% p.a.	Year / Pop. / ±% p.a.	Year / Pop. / ±% p.a.	Year / Pop. / ±% p.a.	Year / Pop. / ±% p.a.	Year / Pop. / ±% p.a.	Year / Pop. / ±% p.a.	Year / Pop. / ±% p.a.	Year / Pop. / ±% p.a.	Year / Pop. / ±% p.a.	Year / Pop. / ±% p.a.	Year / Pop. / ±% p.a.	Year / Pop. / ±% p.a.	Year / Pop. / ±% p.a.	Year / Pop. / ±% p.a.	Year / Pop. / ±% p.a.	Year / Pop. / ±% p.a.	Year / Pop. / ±% p.a.	Year / Pop. / ±% p.a.	Year / Pop. / ±% p.a.	Year / Pop. / ±% p.a.	Year / Pop. / ±% p.a.	Year / Pop. / ±% p.a.	Year / Pop. / ±% p.a.	Year / Pop. / ±% p.a.	Year / Pop. / ±% p.a.	Year / Pop. / ±% p.a.	Year / Pop. / ±% p.a.	Year / Pop. / ±% p.a.	Year / Pop. / ±% p.a.	Year / Pop. / ±% p.a.	Year / Pop. / ±% p.a.	Year / Pop. / ±% p.a.	Year / Pop. / ±% p.a.	Year / Pop. / ±% p.a.	Year / Pop. / ±% p.a.	Year / Pop. / ±% p.a.	Year / Pop. / ±% p.a.	Year / Pop. / ±% p.a.	Year / Pop. / ±% p.a.	Year / Pop. / ±% p.a.	Year / Pop. / ±% p.a.	Year / Pop. / ±% p.a.	Year / Pop. / ±% p.a.	Year / Pop. / ±% p.a.	Year / Pop. / ±% p.a.	Year / Pop. / ±% p.a.	Year / Pop. / ±% p.a.	Year / Pop. / ±% p.a.	Year / Pop. / ±% p.a.	Year / Pop. / ±% p.a.	Year / Pop. / ±% p.a.	Year / Pop. / ±% p.a.	Year / Pop. / ±% p.a.	Year / Pop. / ±% p.a.	Year / Pop. / ±% p.a.	Year / Pop. / ±% p.a.	Year / Pop. / ±% p.a.	Year / Pop. / ±% p.a.	Year / Pop. / ±% p.a.	Year / Pop. / ±% p.a.	Year / Pop. / ±% p.a.	Year / Pop. / ±% p.a.	Year / Pop. / ±% p.a.	Year / Pop. / ±% p.a.	Year / Pop. / ±% p.a.	Year / Pop. / ±% p.a.	Year / Pop. / ±% p.a.	Year / Pop. / ±% p.a.	Year / Pop. / ±% p.a.	Year / Pop. / ±% p.a.	Year / Pop. / ±% p.a.	Year / Pop. / ±% p.a.	Year / Pop. / ±% p.a.	Year / Pop. / ±% p.a.	Year / Pop. / ±% p.a.	Year / Pop. / ±% p.a.	Year / Pop. / ±% p.a.	Year / Pop. / ±% p.a.	Year / Pop. / ±% p.a.	Year / Pop. / ±% p.a.	Year / Pop. / ±% p.a.	Year / Pop. / ±% p.a.	Year / Pop. / ±% p.a.	Year / Pop. / ±% p.a.	Year / Pop. / ±% p.a.	Year / Pop. / ±% p.a.	Year / Pop. / ±% p.a.	Year / Pop. / ±% p.a.	Year / Pop. / ±% p.a.	Year / Pop. / ±% p.a.	Year / Pop. / ±% p.a.	Year / Pop. / ±% p.a.	Year / Pop. / ±% p.a.	Year / Pop. / ±% p.a.	Year / Pop. / ±% p.a.	Year / Pop. / ±% p.a.	Year / Pop. / ±% p.a.	Year / Pop. / ±% p.a.	Year / Pop. / ±% p.a.	Year / Pop. / ±% p.a.	Year / Pop. / ±% p.a.	Year / Pop. / ±% p.a.	Year / Pop. / ±% p.a.	Year / Pop. / ±% p.a.	Year / Pop. / ±% p.a.	Year / Pop. / ±% p.a.	Year / Pop. / ±% p.a.	Year / Pop. / ±% p.a.	Year / Pop. / ±% p.a.	Year / Pop. / ±% p.a.	Year / Pop. / ±% p.a.	Year / Pop. / ±% p.a.	Year / Pop. / ±% p.a.	Year / Pop. / ±% p.a.	Year / Pop. / ±% p.a.	Year / Pop. / ±% p.a.	Year / Pop. / ±% p.a.	Year / Pop. / ±% p.a.	Year / Pop. / ±% p.a.	Year / Pop. / ±% p.a.	Year / Pop. / ±% p.a.	Year / Pop. / ±% p.a.	Year / Pop. / ±% p.a.	Year / Pop. / ±% p.a.	Year / Pop. / ±% p.a.	Year / Pop. / ±% p.a.	Year / Pop. / ±% p.a.	Year / Pop. / ±% p.a.	Year / Pop. / ±% p.a.	Year / Pop. / ±% p.a.	Year / Pop. / ±% p.a.	Year / Pop. / ±% p.a.	Year / Pop. / ±% p.a.	Year / Pop. / ±% p.a.	Year / Pop. / ±% p.a.	Year / Pop. / ±% p.a.	Year / Pop. / ±% p.a.	Year / Pop. / ±% p.a.	Year / Pop. / ±% p.a.	Year / Pop. / ±% p.a.	Year / Pop. / ±% p.a.	Year / Pop. / ±% p.a.	Year / Pop. / ±% p.a.	Year / Pop. / ±% p.a.	Year / Pop. / ±% p.a.	Year / Pop. / ±% p.a.	Year / Pop. / ±% p.a.	Year / Pop. / ±% p.a.	Year / Pop. / ±% p.a.	Year / Pop. / ±% p.a.	Year / Pop. / ±% p.a.	Year / Pop. / ±% p.a.	Year / Pop. / ±% p.a.	Year / Pop. / ±% p.a.	Year / Pop. / ±% p.a.	Year / Pop. / ±% p.a.	Year / Pop. / ±% p.a.	Year / Pop. / ±% p.a.	Year / Pop. / ±% p.a.	Year / Pop. / ±% p.a.	Year / Pop. / ±% p.a.	Year / Pop. / ±% p.a.	Year / Pop. / ±% p.a.	Year / Pop. / ±% p.a.	Year / Pop. / ±% p.a.	Year / Pop. / ±% p.a.	Year / Pop. / ±% p.a.	Year / Pop. / ±% p.a.	Year / Pop. / ±% p.a.	Year / Pop. / ±% p.a.	Year / Pop. / ±% p.a.	Year / Pop. / ±% p.a.	Year / Pop. / ±% p.a.	Year / Pop. / ±% p.a.	Year / Pop. / ±% p.a.	Year / Pop. / ±% p.a.	Year / Pop. / ±% p.a.	Year / Pop. / ±% p.a.	Year / Pop. / ±% p.a.	Year / Pop. / ±% p.a.	Year / Pop. / ±% p.a.	Year / Pop. / ±% p.a.	Year / Pop. / ±% p.a.	Year / Pop. / ±% p.a.	Year / Pop. / ±% p.a.	Year / Pop. / ±% p.a.	Year / Pop. / ±% p.a.	Year / Pop. / ±% p.a.	Year / Pop. / ±% p.a.	Year / Pop. / ±% p.a.	Year / Pop. / ±% p.a.	Year / Pop. / ±% p.a.	Year / Pop. / ±% p.a.	Year / Pop. / ±% p.a.	Year / Pop. / ±% p.a.	Year / Pop. / ±% p.a.	Year / Pop. / ±% p.a.	Year / Pop. / ±% p.a.	Year / Pop. / ±% p.a.	Year / Pop. / ±% p.a.	Year / Pop. / ±% p.a.	Year / Pop. / ±% p.a.	Year / Pop. / ±% p.a.	Year / Pop. / ±% p.a.	Year / Pop. / ±% p.a.	Year / Pop. / ±% p.a.	Year / Pop. / ±% p.a.	Year / Pop. / ±% p.a.	Year / Pop. / ±% p.a.	Year / Pop. / ±% p.a.	Year / Pop. / ±% p.a.	Year / Pop. / ±% p.a.	Year / Pop. / ±% p.a.	Year / Pop. / ±% p.a.	Year / Pop. / ±% p.a.	Year / Pop. / ±% p.a.	Year / Pop. / ±% p.a.	Year / Pop. / ±% p.a.	Year / Pop. / ±% p.a.
Source: TÜIK (2007–2022)

== Sister Cities of Keçiören Municipality ==
https://www.kecioren.bel.tr/belediyeler-1-kardes_belediyeler.html

== Mayors of Government Keçiören Municipality ==
- 1984–1989 Melih Gökçek ANAP
- 1989–1994 Hamza Kırmızı SHP
- 1994–1999 Turgut Altınok MHP
- 1999–2001 Turgut Altınok Fazilet Party
- 2001–2009 Turgut Altınok AK Party
- 2009–2019 Mustafa Ak AK Party
- 2019–2024 March Turgut Altınok AK Party
- 2024 March – Present Mesut Özarslan Republican People's Party
