= Etlik =

- Neighbourhood
- Location in Turkey Etlik (Turkey Central Anatolia)
- Coordinates: 39°59′N 32°49′E
- Country: Turkey
- Province: Ankara
- District: Keçiören
- Population (2022): 32,156
- Time zone: UTC+3 (TRT)

Etlik is a neighbourhood in the Keçiören, Ankara City, Turkey. Its population is 32,156 (2022). The neighbourhood is located between İncirli, Aşağı Eğlence and Gümüşdere neighbourhoods. It borders the district of Yenimahalle in the south.
