= Aydın Pınarbaşı-Aytepe Gondola =

Aerial lift in Aydin, Turkey

- Aydın Pınarbaşı-Aytepe Teleferik
- Location within Turkey

Overview
- Status: Operational
- Character: Recreational
- Location: Aydın
- Country: Turkey
- Coordinates: 37°51′17″N 27°50′41″E
- Termini: Pınarbaşı (west); Aytepe (east)
- No. of stations: 2
- Built by: STM Sistem Teleferik, Turkey
- Construction cost: ₺2.620 million (approx. US$1.578 million in March 2009)
- Construction begin: September 2008
- Open: March 2009
- Closed: April 2009
- Reopened: October 8, 2012; 13 years ago

Operation
- Owner: Aydın Municipality
- Operator: Aydın Municipality
- No. of carriers: 6 (in two sets of 3)
- Carrier capacity: 6
- Ridership: 216 hourly
- Operating times: 8:00-17:00 (weekdays), 9:00-17:30 (weekends)
- Trip duration: 5 min.
- Fare: ₺1.50

Technical features
- Aerial lift type: Bi-cable gondola detachable
- Manufactured by: STM Sistem Teleferik, Turkey
- Line length: 563 m (1,847 ft)
- No. of support towers: 5
- Cable diameter: 41 mm (1.6 in)
- Installed power: 100 kW
- Operating speed: max. 3 m/s (9.8 ft/s)

The Aydın Pınarbaşı-Aytepe Gondola (Turkish: Aydın Pınarbaşı-Aytepe Teleferik Hattı) is a two-station aerial lift line of gondola type in Aydın serving hilltop Aytepe from Pınarbaşı.

The project of an aerial lift line to provide easy access between the recreational resorts Pınarbaşı and Aytepe (literally: Moon Hill) goes back to 2006. The 563 m (1,847 ft) long line with five intermediate support towers was constructed by the Turkish company STM Sistem Teleferik from İzmir, which delivered also the technical equipment. The construction of the line began in September 2008.

Cost ₺2.620 million (approx. US$1.578 million in March 2009), the gondola line went in service in the beginning of March 2009. The operation was suspended beginning of April 2009 by the newly elected mayor right after the 2009 local elections with the rationale "lack of proficient personnel". Due to pressure by local citizens, the abondened facility reopened in September 2011 for free-of-charge use following overhaul works. However, the line stopped shortly after again. On October 8, 2012, the gondola line became operational for the third time. It runs on weekdays between 8:00-17:00 and on weekends between 9:00-17:30 hours. Since the line has no illumination, its operation in the darkness is not possible due to security reasons. It is planned to add necessary illumination installation to extend the operation hours. A total of six gondolas each capable of six passengers, which run in two sets of three cabins in a row, can transport 216 people hourly. The trip takes five minutes. The fare is ₺1.50.

== Features ==
- Length: 563 m (1,847 ft)
- Height difference: 87 m (285 ft)
- Speed: max. 3 m/s
- Ridership: 216 hourly
- Cabin capacity: 6
- Engine power: 100 kW
- Cable diameter: 41 mm
- Fare: ₺1.50
- Terminals:
  - Pınarbaşı 37°51′17″N 27°50′41″E
  - Aytepe 37°51′13″N 27°51′03″E

== See also ==
- List of gondola lifts in Turkey
