= Keçiören Gondola =

Gondola system in Ankara, Turkey

- Keçiören teleferiği
- Location within Turkey

Overview
- Status: Operational
- Character: Urban
- Location: Keçiören, Ankara
- Country: Turkey
- Coordinates: 39°59′04″N 32°51′55″E
- Termini: Cumhuriyet (north); Atatürk (south)
- No. of stations: 2
- Built by: STM Sistem Teleferik, İzmir
- Open: April 2008; 18 years ago
- Website: www.keciorenteleferik.com/index.php

Operation
- Owner: Keçiören Municipality
- Operator: Keçiören Municipality
- No. of carriers: 16
- Carrier capacity: 8
- Ridership: 384 hourly
- Operating times: 12:00 - 21:00 (Workdays), 12:00 - 22:00 (Weekends)
- Trip duration: 20 min.
- Fare: ₺1.00

Technical features
- Aerial lift type: Bi-cable gondola detachable
- Line length: 1,653 m (5,423 ft)
- Cable diameter: 46 mm (1.8 in)
- Installed power: 160 kW
- Operating speed: max. 5 m/s (16 ft/s)

The Keçiören Gondola (Turkish: Keçiören teleferiği) is a two-station gondola-type line of aerial lift passenger transport system situated in Keçiören district of Ankara, Turkey. Opened in April 2008, the 1,653 m (5,423 ft) long line connects Kavacık Subayevleri neighborhood (Atatürk station) in the south with Tepebaşı neighborhood (Cumhuriyet station) in the north within Keçiören. It is operated by Keçiören Municipality.

The line was designed and the system was delivered by the Turkish ropeway producing company STM Sistem Teleferik from İzmir. The construction works completed in November 2007, and following the test runs, the line went in service in April 2008. It is the longest urban gondola lift line in Turkey.

Sixteen detachable cabins each capable of eight passengers transport hourly 384 people between the two stations. The ride lasts 20 minutes. The municipality dropped the fare from initially 5.00 ₺ to 1.00 ₺ in April 2013.

== Specifications ==
- Line length: 1,653 m (5,423 ft)
- Height distance: 65.5 m (215 ft)
- Number of stations: 2
- Number of cabins: 16 each eight-seater
- Trip duration: 20 minutes
- Operating speed: max. 5 m/s (16 ft/s)
- Hourly ridership: 384
- Cable diameter = 46 mm (1.8 in)
- Engine power: 160 kW
- Operational hours: 12:00 - 21:00 (Workdays), 12:00 - 22:00 (Weekends)
- Fare: 1.00 ₺
- Terminals:
  - Cumhuriyet (Tepebaşı) 39°59′04″N 32°51′55″E
  - Atatürk (Kavacık Subayevleri) 39°58′08″N 32°51′56″E

== See also ==
- List of gondola lifts in Turkey
