= STM Sistem Teleferik =

- Company type: Anonim şirket
- Founded: 1998
- Headquarters: İzmir, Turkey
- Area served: Worldwide
- Key people: İhsan DADAK (CEO); Reşit TEZCAN (COO)
- Number of employees: +50
- Website: www.stmteleferik.com.tr

STM Sistem Teleferik is a Turkish aerial lift-manufacturing company located in İzmir. Established in 1998, it is notable for the construction of the longest chairlift line in Turkey, and the first detachable gondola lift line in the capital, Ankara.

The company was founded in 1998 by Orhan Yılmaz, who worked for 24 years as an operator at the Balçova Gondola in İzmir, and Reşit Tezcan. Orhan Yılmaz acts currently as the CEO of the company. As of 2013, STM Sistem Teleferik is the only Turkish company in the field of ropeway systems. It builds ski lifts, fix-grip and detachable chairlifts, group and detachable gondolas as well as reversible ropeways. The company employs 250 people at its facility in Kemalpaşa district of İzmir, which covers an area of 7,000 m^{2} (75,000 sq ft) on 25,000 m^{2} (270,000 sq ft) ground.

== Projects ==
The company's first major project was the ski lift system in 2003 built with the Italian company Graffer Seggiovie, and the chairlift system in 2006 built at ski resort on Mount Davraz in Isparta before building mostly ski lift lines in domestic ski resorts. Aerial lifts constructed in many places of Turkey followed as Keçiören Gondola in Ankara (2007), Muş Ski Lift (2008), Aydın Pınarbaşı-Aytepe Gondola (2008), Kars Sarıkamış Chairlift and Kars Çamurlu T-bar lift (2009), Erzincan Mt. Ergan Chairlift (2010), Van Gevaş Abalı Chairlift (2011), Çankırı-Ilgaz Chairlift (2012), Hakkari-Merga Büte (2012). STM constructed the Balakən Gondola in 2007 as the first aerial lift of Azerbaijan.

The renovation and extension of İzmir Metropolitan Municipality's Balçova Gondola line, which was closed in 2007, was carried out by STM at a cost of ₺ 10.225 million (approx. US$5.680 million), and was completed in 2015.
